= 7th César Awards =

1982 French film awards ceremony

- Date: 27 February 1982
- Site: Salle Pleyel, Paris, France
- Hosted by: Pierre Tchernia and Jacques Martin

Highlights
- Best Film: Quest for Fire
- Best Actor: Michel Serrault
- Best Actress: Isabelle Adjani

Television coverage
- Network: Antenne 2

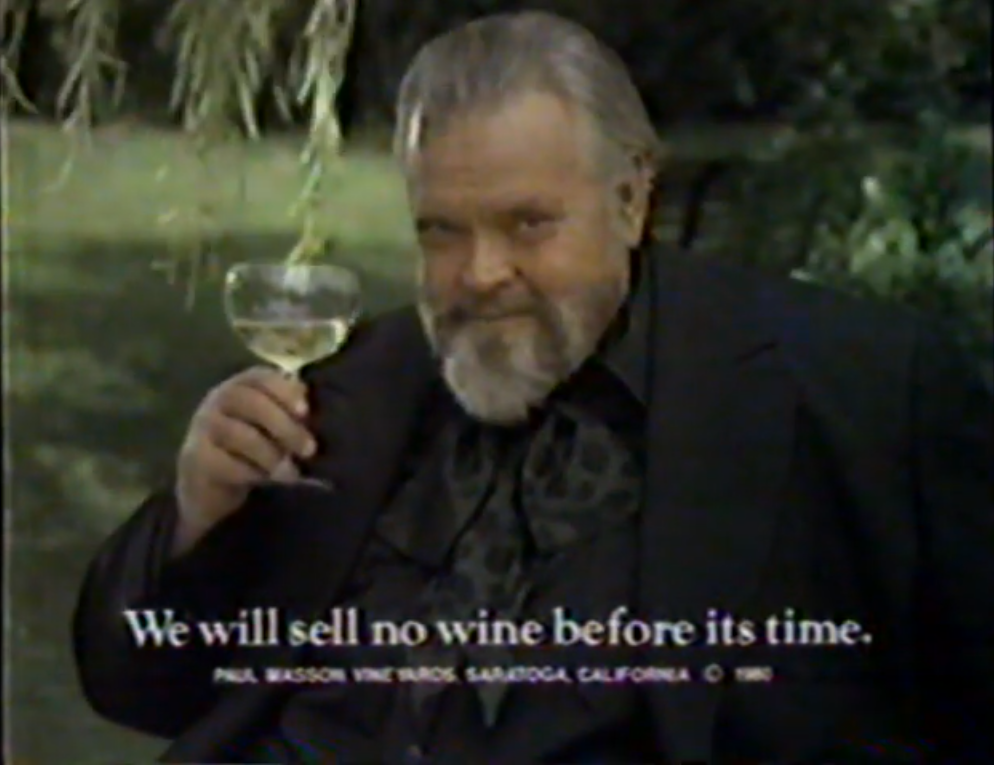
Orson Welles as he appeared in a series of 1978-1981 adverts for Paul Masson wines

The 7th César Awards ceremony, presented by the Académie des Arts et Techniques du Cinéma, honoured the best French films of 1981 and took place on 27 February 1982 at the Salle Pleyel in Paris. The ceremony was chaired by Orson Welles and hosted by Pierre Tchernia and Jacques Martin. Quest for Fire won the award for Best Film.

== Winners and nominees ==
The winners are highlighted in bold:

- Best Film:
  **Quest for Fire**, directed by Jean-Jacques Annaud
  Coup de Torchon, directed by Bertrand Tavernier
  Garde à vue, directed by Claude Miller
  Les Uns et les Autres, directed by Claude Lelouch
- Best Foreign Film:
  **The Elephant Man**, directed by David Lynch
  Die Fälschung, directed by Volker Schlöndorff
  Raiders of the Lost Ark, directed by Steven Spielberg
  Man of Iron, directed by Andrzej Wajda
- Best First Work:
  **Diva**, directed by Jean-Jacques Beineix
  Le Jardinier, directed by Jean-Pierre Sentier
  Neige, directed by Juliet Berto and Jean-Henri Roger
  Une affaire d'hommes, directed by Nicolas Ribowski
- Best Actor:
  **Michel Serrault**, for Garde à vue
  Patrick Dewaere, for Beau-père
  Philippe Noiret, for Coup de Torchon
  Michel Piccoli, for Une étrange affaire
- Best Actress:
  **Isabelle Adjani**, for Possession
  Isabelle Huppert, for Coup de Torchon
  Fanny Ardant, for La Femme d'à côté
  Catherine Deneuve, for Hôtel des Amériques
- Best Supporting Actor:
  **Guy Marchand**, for Garde à vue
  Jean-Pierre Marielle, for Coup de Torchon
  Eddy Mitchell, for Coup de Torchon
  Gérard Lanvin, for Une étrange affaire
- Best Supporting Actress:
  **Nathalie Baye**, for Une étrange affaire
  Stéphane Audran, for Coup de Torchon
  Véronique Silver, for La Femme d'à côté
  Sabine Haudepin, for Hôtel des Amériques
- Best Director:
  **Jean-Jacques Annaud**, for La Guerre du feu
  Bertrand Tavernier, for Coup de Torchon
  Claude Miller, for Garde à vue
  Pierre Granier-Deferre, for Une étrange affaire
- Best Screenplay, Dialogue or Adaptation:
  **Claude Miller, Jean Herman, Michel Audiard**, for Garde à vue
  Jean Aurenche, Bertrand Tavernier, for Coup de Torchon
  Gérard Brach, for La Guerre du feu
  Christopher Frank, Pierre Granier-Deferre, Jean-Marc Roberts, for Une étrange affaire
- Best Cinematography:
  **Philippe Rousselot**, for Diva
  Bruno Nuytten, for Garde à vue
  Claude Agostini, for La Guerre du feu
  Jean Penzer, for Malevil
- Best Sound:
  **Jean-Pierre Ruh**, for Diva
  Paul Lainé, for Garde à vue
  Pierre Gamet, for Malevil
  Harald Maury, for Les Uns et les Autres
- Best Editing:
  **Albert Jurgenson**, for Garde à vue
  Armand Psenny, for Coup de Torchon
  Henri Lanoë, for Malevil
  Sophie Bhaud, Hugues Darmois, for Les Uns et les Autres
- Best Music:
  **Vladimir Cosma**, for Diva
  Philippe Sarde, for La Guerre du feu
  Ennio Morricone, for Le Professionnel
  Francis Lai, Michel Legrand, for Les Uns et les Autres
- Best Animated Short:
  **La Tendresse du maudit**, directed by Jean-Manuel Costa
  Trois thèmes, directed by Alexander Alexeieff
  L'Échelle, directed by Alain Ughetto
- Best Fiction Short Film:
  **Les Photos d'Alix**, directed by Jean Eustache
  Cher Alexandre, directed by Anne Lemonier
  Le Concept subtil, directed by Gérard Krawczyk
  Le Rat noir d'amérique, directed by Jérôme Enrico
- Best Documentary Short Film:
  **Reporters**, directed by Raymond Depardon
  Ci-Gisent, directed by Valérie Moncorgé
  Solange Giraud, née Tache, directed by Simone Bitton
- Best Production Design:
  **Max Douy**, for Malevil
  Alexandre Trauner, for Coup de Torchon
  Hilton McConnico, for Diva
  Brian Morris, for La Guerre du feu
- Honorary César:
  Georges Dancigers
  Alexandre Mnouchkine

== See also ==
- 54th Academy Awards
- 35th British Academy Film Awards
