= Vigneau =

Vigneaux may refer to:

- Château du Vigneau, a former winery in Bayonne, France
- Château de Rayne-Vigneau, a castle and white wine appellation of Bordeaux, France
- André Vigneau (1892–1968), French photographer, see Robert Doisneau
- Placide Vigneau (1842–?1946), French-Canadian author and lighthouse keeper
- Robert Vigneau (born 1933), French poet

== See also ==
- Vigneaux (disambiguation)
