= Paul Klein =

Paul Klein may refer to:

- Paul Klein (missionary) (1652–1717), Czech Jesuit missionary in the Philippines, pharmacist and Cavite College rector, often referred to as Pablo Clain, or Paulus or Pavel Klein
- Paul L. Klein (1929–98), developer of pay-per-view TV channels and creator of the least objectionable program theory
- Paul Klein (chess player) (1915–1992), German–Ecuadorian chess player
- Paul Klein (art dealer) (1946–2020), American art activist from Chicago
- Paul Klein, musical theatre composer who collaborated with the lyricist Fred Ebb
- Paul Klein (musician), American musician and record producer

== See also ==
- Paul Kline (1937–1999), psychologist
- Paul Kline (photographer) (born 1964), American photographer
- Pauline Klein (born 1976), French writer
