= Prix Maurice Genevoix =

- Awarded for: To recognize a French literary work which honors the memory and work of Maurice Genevoix
- Sponsored by: Académie française
- Country: France
- Presented by: Académie française
- Rewards: Silver-gilt medal and variable cash amount
- First award: 1985
- Final award: Active
- Website: Prix Maurice Genevoix (Académie Française)

The Prix Maurice Genevoix (Le prix Maurice Genevoix) is an annual French literary award made in honor of its namesake Maurice Genevoix (1890–1980). It is intended to recognize a French literary work which, by its topic or style, honors the memory and work of Maurice Genevoix. The prize was founded in 1985 in the city of Garches under the initiative of mayor Yves Bodin, who was a family friend of Genevoix. In 2004 the award was officially established at the Académie française as a "Grand Prix", meaning the winner receives a silver-gilt medal and variable cash amount, thus increasing its prestige and importance since 2004.

== Winners ==
List of winners. Prizes awarded since 2004 are from the Académie française.

- 2026 – Christian Authier, Comme un père
- 2025 – Antoine Choplin, La Barque de Masao
- 2024 – Alice Renard, La Colère et l’Envie
- 2023 – Sibylle Grimbert, Le Dernier des siens
- 2022 – Louis-Henri de La Rochefoucauld, Châteaux de sable
- 2021 – Michel Bernard, Le Bon Sens
- 2020 – Arthur Lochmann, La Vie solide. La charpente comme éthique du faire
- 2019 – Jean-Marie Planes, Une vie de soleil et l’ensemble de son oeuvre
- 2018 – Jean Chalon, Ultimes messages d'amour (Tourneciel)
- 2017 – Antoine Rault, La Danse des vivants (Albin Michel)
- 2016 – Élisabeth Barillé, L'Oreille d'or d'Élisabeth Barillé, (Grasset)
- 2015 – Clara Dupont-Monod, Le roi disait que j'étais diable, (Grasset)
- 2014 – Jean-Christophe Rufin, Le Collier rouge (Gallimard)
- 2013 – Isabelle Autissier, L'Amant de Patagonie (Grasset)
- 2012 – Thierry Laget, La lanterne d'Aristote (Gallimard)
- 2011 – Alain Borer, Le Ciel & la carte : Carnet de voyage dans les mers du Sud à bord de La Boudeuse
- 2010 – Jean-Louis Ezine, Les taiseux (Gallimard)
- 2009 – Michel Bernard, La maison du docteur Laheurte (Table ronde)
- 2008 – Marie Didier, Morte-saison sur la ficelle : Et autres récits (Gallimard)
- 2007 – Jacques Godbout, La concierge du Panthéon (Seuil)
- 2006 – Brina Svit, Un coeur de trop (Gallimard)
- 2005 – Stéphane Audeguy, La théorie des nuages (Gallimard)
- 2004 – Daniel Maximin, Tu, c'est l'enfance (Gallimard)
- 2003 – Gilles Lapouge, En étrange pays (Albin Michel)
- 2002 – Nicolas Vanier, Le chant du grand nord (XO)
- 2001 – Jérôme Garcin, C’était tous les jours tempête (Gallimard)
- 2000 – Pascale Roze, Lettre d'été (Albin Michel)
- 1999 – Geneviève Dormann, Adieu, phénomène (Albin Michel)
- 1998 – Jean-Marc Roberts, Une petite femme (Grasset)
- 1997 – Ève de Castro, Nous serons comme des dieux (Albin Michel)
- 1996 – Anne Wiazemsky, Hymnes à l'amour (Gallimard)
- 1995 – Jean-Noel Pancrazi, Madame Arnould (Gallimard)
- 1994 – Michel del Castillo, Rue des Archives (Gallimard)
- 1993 – Bertrand Visage, Bambini (Seuil)
- 1992 – Pierre Veilletet, Querencia (Arléa)
- 1991 – Jean-Didier Wolfromm, La Leçon inaugurale (Grasset)
- 1990 – Marcel Schneider, L'éternité fragile (Grasset)
- 1989 – Jean-Marie Rouart, La Femme de proie (Grasset)
- 1988 – Jean-François Deniau, La Désirade, (Olivier Orban)
- 1987 – Rose Vincent, L'Adieu aux Champs (Seuil)
- 1986 – Gilles Pudlowski, L'Amour du Pays (Flammarion)
- 1985 – Nicolas Saudray, La Maison des Prophètes (Seuil)
