= Daguet =

Daguet (French pronunciation: ['daɡɛ]) is a French word for the Brocket deer), it can refer to any of the following:

== French Military ==
- Opération Daguet, the codename for French operations during the 1991 Gulf War
  - Division Daguet, a French Army division formed in September 1990
- Camouflage Daguet, desert camouflage

== People ==
- Dominique Daguet (1938-2021), French writer, poet and journalist
- Alexandre Daguet (1816-1894) Swiss historian
