= Dejean =

Dejean is a surname. Notable people with the surname include:

- Cooper DeJean (born 2003), American football player
- Louis Dejean (circus owner) (1786–1879), French circus proprietor
- Louis Dejean (sculptor) (1872–1954), French sculptor and engraver
- Mike DeJean (born 1970), American baseball player
- Jean François Aimé Dejean (1749–1824), French army officer and minister of state in the service of the First French Republic and the First French Empire
- Jean-Luc Déjean (1921–2006), French writer
- Philippe DeJean (1736–c.1809), judge in Fort Detroit until he was captured during the American Revolution
- Pierre Charles Dejean (1807–1872), French general and politician
- Pierre François Marie Auguste Dejean (1780–1845), French entomologist

== See also ==
- Dejean's theorem
