= A Very Curious Girl =

1969 French film directed by Nelly Kaplan

- Directed by: Nelly Kaplan
- Screenplay by: Nelly Kaplan; Claude Makovski; Jacques Serguine; Michel Fabre
- Produced by: Moshé Mizrahi
- Starring: Bernadette Lafont; Georges Géret
- Cinematography: Jean Badal
- Edited by: Nelly Kaplan
- Music by: Georges Moustaki
- Release date: 3 December 1969 (France)
- Running time: 106 minutes
- Country: France
- Language: French

A Very Curious Girl (French: La Fiancée du pirate - The Pirate's Fiancée, also titled Dirty Mary) is a 1969 French comedy-drama film directed, edited and co-written by Nelly Kaplan.

== Plot ==
Marie is a young woman who lives in absolute poverty in the fictional village and commune of Tellier (an allusion to La Maison Tellier) with her mother, a woman of obscure origins suspected to be a Romany sorcerer, and her pet billy-goat. Marie and her mother are despised by the locals, although Marie is also a sexual object for them, including her lesbian boss Irène.

When her mother is killed by a hit-and-run driver, Marie refuses to allow the priest to giver her a Christian burial, citing the mistreatment to which the church and people of Tellier had subjected them both. Instead, she convinces several of the townspeople to bury her mother outside the shack where they lived on Irène's farm. Then she decides to take revenge on those people who have taken advantage of her.

She begins by sleeping with many of the local men in exchange for money, becoming relatively wealthy (compared to her previous meagre life) while garnering social and political influence. At the same time, she grows closer to André, a travelling projectionist. Throughout the film, Marie uses her influence to unmask the hypocrisy and selfishness of the people of Tellier, in particular its patriarchal men.

== Cast ==
- Bernadette Lafont as Marie
- Georges Géret as Gaston Duvalier, the village guard
- Michel Constantin as André, the projectionist
- Julien Guiomar as the Duke
- Jean Parédès as Monsieur Paul, the herbalist
- Francis Lax as Émile, the commune council member
- Claire Maurier as Irène, Marie's boss
- Marcel Pérès as Grandpa
- Pascal Mazzotti : Abbé Dard
- Jacques Masson : Hippolyte Duvalier, Gaston's son
- Henry Czarniak : Julien, Irène's farmhand
- Jacques Marin : Félix Lechat, the café owner
- Micha Bayard : Mélanie « La Goulette » Lechat, Félix's wife
- Fernand Berset : Jeanjean, the lingerie salesman
- Renée Duncan : Fifine (Delphine), Émile's wife
- Gilberte Géniat : Rose, the Duke's wife
- Claire Olivier : Marie's mother
- Louis Malle : Jésus, the Duke's Spanish farmhand
- Claude Makovski : Victor, the shop owner

== Score ==
Georges Moustaki's soundtrack was released in the same year as the film.

1. Histoire du Cirque (1:22)
2. Duo (2:21)
3. La Mort (2:08)
4. Pierre et Nicole (2:44)
5. Thème de Franca (1:37)
6. A Lisbonne (fado) (1:37)
7. Retour à L'hôtel (2:18)
8. Le Scandale / Suite (11:40)
9. Mona (1:31)
10. Anne et Claude au Musée (2:27)
11. Le Désespoir de Muriel (3:52)
12. La Déclaration d'Amour (2:25)
13. La Rupture (3.46)
14. Epilogue (2:25)
15. Une Petite Ile (1:30)
16. Anne et Claude (2:05)
17. Moi, Je Me Balance (2:46)
18. Marche de Marie (2:35)

== Critical reception ==
The New York Times listed A Very Curious Girl as one of Bernadette Lafont's most notable films. The website filmfanatic.org put this film into the category "Foreign Gem". The Guardian mentions "A curious girl" in her obituary and states Lafont's performance had been "brilliant".
