= Prix Fénéon =

French-language literary award

The Fénéon Prize (Prix Fénéon), established in 1949, is awarded annually to a French-language writer and a visual artist no older than 35 years of age. The prize was established by Fanny Fénéon, the widow of French art critic Félix Fénéon. She bequeathed the proceeds from the sale of his art collection to the University of Paris, whose Vice Chancellor chairs the award jury.

== Recipients ==
=== Art ===
- 1950: Mireille Miailhe
- 1951: Louis Derbré for Buste de Louis Werschürr, Paul Rebeyrolle and Paul Collomb
- 1952: Jack Ottaviano & Marcel Fiorini
- 1953: André Cottavoz, Jean Fusaro and Gérard Lanvin
- 1954: Lucien Fleury, René Laubies and Roger-Edgar Gillet
- 1955: Huguette Arthur Bertrand
- 1957: Françoise Salmon, Pierre Parsus and Gabriel Godard
- 1962: Jean Revol
- 1963: Bernard Le Quellec
- 1964: Jean Parsy
- 1966: Michel Moy
- 1968: Paul-Henri Friquet
- 1969: Pierre Gaste
- 1972: Henri Reiter
- 1973: Jean-Luc Parant
- 1976: Bernard Gabriel Lafabrie
- 1977: Jean-Pierre Vieren
- 1978: Vincent Rougier
- 1979: Jean-Jacques Dournon
- 1981: Mathias Pérez
- 1983: Marie Morel
- 1987: Paul Pagk
- 1994: Pál Breznay
- 1998: Florent Chopin
- 2002: Xavier Escriba
- 2003: Xavier Drong
- 2007: Thilleli Rahmoun
- 2008: Étienne Fouchet
- 2010: Marion Verboom
- 2011: Franck Masanell
- 2012: Anne-Charlotte Yver
- 2013: Félix Pinquier
- 2014: Claire Chesnier
- 2015: Julia Gault
- 2016: Alice Louradour
- 2017: Raphaëlle Peria
- 2018: Salomé Fauc
- 2019: Maxime Biou
- 2020: Quentin Guichard and Hui Liu
- 2021: Rebecca Topakian
- 2022: Mykola Mudryk-Teslyuk
- 2023: Edouard Fabre

=== Literature ===
- 1949: Michel Cournot for Martinique
- 1950: Alfred Kern for Le jardin perdu and Celou Arasco for La Cote des malfaisants
- 1951: Claude Roy for Le poète mineur, Béatrix Beck for Une mort irrégulière and Micheline Peyrebonne for Leur sale pitié.
- 1952: Michel Vinaver for L'Objecteur
- 1953: Mohamed Dib for La Grande Maison, Francis Jeanson for Montaigne peint par lui-même and Claude Levy for Une histoire vraie
- 1954: Jean-Luc Déjean for Les Voleurs de pauvres, Albert Memmi for La Statue de sel and Alain Robbe-Grillet for Les Gommes
- 1955: Jean David for Les Passes du silence, Marcel Allemann for Les Exploits du Grand Zapata, Robert Droguet for Féminaire and Pierre Oster for Le Champ de mai
- 1956: Dominique Vazeilles for La Route vers la mer, François Clément for Le Fils désobéissant and Georges Conchon for Les Honneurs de la guerre
- 1957: Michel Butor for L'Emploi du temps, Michel Breitman for L'Homme aux mouettes, Jacques Bens for Chanson vécue and Laurent La Praye for La Trompette des anges
- 1958: Jean-François Revel for Pourquoi les philosophes ?, Philippe Sollers for Le Défi and Jacques Cousseau for Le Chien gris
- 1959: Armand Gatti for Le Poisson noir, Jean Forton for La Cendre aux yeux, Robert Vigneau for Planches d'anatomie and Jean Fanchette for Archipels
- 1960: Dominique Daguet for Soleil et Lune, Suzanne Martin for Rue des vivants and Yves Velan for Je
- 1961: Jean Thibaudeau for Cérémonie royale, Jean Laugier for Les Bogues and Michel Deguy for Fragments du cadastre
- 1962: Jacques Serguine for Les Saints Innocents, Noël Quatrepoint for Journal d'un être humain and Stephen Jourdain for Cette vie m'aime
- 1963: Jean Gilbert for his novel L'Enfant et le harnais, Marcelin Pleynet for Provisoires amants des nègres and Jean-Pierre Steinbach a.k.a. Jean-Philippe Salabreuil for Poèmes de mon cru
- 1964: Jeanine Segelle for Le Pivert s'envole and Claude Durand for L'Autre vie
- 1965: Denis Roche for Les Idées centésimales de Miss Elanize, Pierre Feuga for La Galère en bois de rose and Nicolas Genka for Jeanne la pudeur
- 1966: Claude Fessaguet for Le Bénéfice du doute and Jean Ricardou for his novel La Prise de Constantinople
- 1967: Didier Martin for Le Déclin des jours and Yves Vequaud for Le Petit Livre avalé
- 1968: Jacques Roubaud for £
- 1969: Patrick Modiano for his novel La Place de l'Étoile
- 1970: Angelo Rinaldi for La Loge du gouverneur
- 1971: Jean Ristat for Du coup d'Etat en littérature
- 1972: Claude Faraggi for Le Signe de la bête
- 1973: Jean-Marc Roberts for Samedi, dimanche et fêtes
- 1974: Paol Keineg for Lieux communs
- 1975: Henri Raczymow for La Saisie
- 1976: Michel Falempin for L'Écrit fait masse
- 1977: Denis Duparc, pseudonym of Renaud Camus, for Échange
- 1978: Mathieu Bénézet for L'Imitation
- 1979: Marc Guyon for Le Principe de solitude
- 1980: Jean Echenoz for Le Méridien de Greenwich
- 1981: Jean-Marie Laclavetine for Les Emmurés
- 1982: Jean-Louis Hue for Le Chat dans tous ses états
- 1983: Bertrand Visage for Au pays des nains
- 1984: Gilles Carpentier for Les Manuscrits de la marmotte
- 1985: Hervé Guibert for Des aveugles
- 1986: Gilles Quinsat for L'Eclipse
- 1987: Laurence Guillon for Le Tsar Hérode
- 1988: Claude Arnaud for Chamfort & Benoît Conort for Pour une île à venir
- 1989: Éric Holder for Duo forte
- 1990: Patrick Cahuzac for Parole de singe
- 1991: Agnès Minazzoli for La Première Ombre
- 1992: Thierry Laget for Iris
- 1993: Éric Chevillard for La Nébuleuse du crabe
- 1994: Anne Grospiron for L'Empyrée
- 1995: Éric Laurrent for Coup de foudre
- 1996: Béatrice Leca for Technique du marbre
- 1997: Linda Lê for Les Trois Parques
- 1998: Arnaud Oseredczuk for 59 préludes à l'évidence
- 2000: Laurent Mauvignier for Loin d'eux
- 2001: Bessora for Les Taches d'encre
- 2002: Tanguy Viel for L'Absolue Perfection du crime
- 2003: Clémence Boulouque for Mort d'un silence
- 2004: Olga Lossky for Requiem pour un clou
- 2005: Hafid Aggoune for Les Avenirs
- 2006: Ivan Farron for Les Déménagements inopportuns
- 2007: Grégoire Polet for Leurs Vies éclatantes
- 2008: Jean-Baptiste Del Amo for Une éducation libertine
- 2010: Pauline Klein for Alice Kahn
- 2011: Justine Augier for En règle avec la nuit
- 2012: Guillaume Louet for having established, prefaced and annotated the Écrits critiques of Jean José Marchand
- 2013: Thomas Augais for his work of poetry Vers Baïkal (mitraille)
- 2014: unawarded
- 2015: Miguel Bonnefoy for Le voyage d'Octavio
- 2016: Colombe Boncenne for Comme neige
- 2017: Fanny Taillandier for Les États et empires du lotissement Grand siècle
- 2018: Julia Kerninon for Ma dévotion
- 2019: Isabelle Mayault for Une longue nuit mexicaine
- 2020: Boris Bergmann for Les Corps insurgés
- 2021: Agathe Saint-Maur for De sel et de fumée
- 2022: Adèle Rosenfeld for Les méduses n'ont pas d'oreilles
- 2023: Elisa Shua Dusapin for Le vieil incendie

== See also ==
- List of European art awards
