= Béatrice Leca =

French writer and radio producer

Béatrice Leca (born 1970 in Paris) is a contemporary French writer, radio documentary producer, and winner of the 1996 edition of the Prix Fénéon. She has produced audio documentaries for France Culture for over two decades and was a former fellow at the Villa Medici.

== Publications ==
- 1996: Technique du marbre, Éditions du Seuil, Prix Fénéon ISBN 978-2020297882
- 1999: Des années encore, Éditions du Seuil ISBN 978-2020353441
- 2004: Aux bords des forêts, Melville ISBN 978-2915341133
- 2019: L'étrange animal, ISBN 978-2714312181
