= Florent Chopin =

French painter

- Born: 1958 (age 67–68)

Florent Chopin (born 1958, Caen) is a French painter. Since 1994, he has been living and working in Saint-Ouen, Seine-Saint-Denis.

== Education and Works ==
Florent Chopin studied social sciences then fine arts in Caen. He began to draw in 1984 and devoted himself totally to his canvases and collages from 1986. He won the Prix Fénéon in 1998.

He was influenced by surrealism and the situationists. He uses a composed technique by mixing collages (images and objects) and painting.

== Exhibitions ==
2009

- Oct/Nov :Peintures, boites, collages Galerie Pierrick Touchefeu, Sceaux (92)

2006

- La position du rêveur couché, Galerie Jean-Pierre Delage, Saintes
- Ici, le monde rêve, Galerie Mirabilia, Lagorce
- Peintures, boites, collages Crid'art, Amnéville les thermes
- Peintures, collages Galerie Pierrick Touchefeu, Sceaux (92)
- Peintures, boites, Galerie Déprez-Bellorget
- Le monde repart dans une heure, Galerie Jacqueline Storme, Lille

2005

- Favre Galerie, Barcelone

2004

- Galerie Déprez-Bellorget, Paris
- « Peintures » Centre Culturel de Savigny-le-Temple

2003

- « Peintures, boites, Livres d'artiste », Mairie de St Ouen l'Aumône
- « Peintures, boites », Galerie C. Amiens

2002

- « Peintures, Boites, Collages », Galerie Geneviève Favre, Avignon
- « Un peu de temps à l?état pur », Folies d'encre, saint Ouen
- « Gravures », Gravicel, Lille
- « Peintures et collages » Art et confrontation, Rouen
- « MAC 2000 », Paris

2001

- « Dreamtime », Les Trinitaires, Metz
- « Les oiseaux naissent sur les branches », Galerie Chantal Vieulle, Grignan
- « Peintures, Boites », Galerie Deprez-Bellorget, Paris

2000

- « L'histoire de la peinture passe par la fenêtre », Galerie Médiart, Paris
- « Peintures, Boites », Village d'Artistes de Rablay sur Layon
- « Florent Chopin - Ronan-Jim Sévellec », Galerie Béatrice Soulié, « MAC 2000 », Paris

1999

- « Peintures, Boites » Galerie André Samuel, Metz
- « Peinture, œuvres sur papier, gravures », Centre culturel de Brive – presentation by Jean-Paul Chavent.
- « Un rêve en décrit un autre » Galerie les Teinturiers, Avignon

1998

- « Il n'y a pas d'horizons lointains », Galerie Mémoranda, Caen - presentation by Alain Jouffroy.
