= Gilles Carpentier =

French writer and editor (1950–2016)

- Born: 14 June 1950; Paris, France
- Died: 16 September 2016 (aged 66)
- Occupations: Writer, editor
- Writing career
- Notable awards: Prix Fénéon (1984)

Gilles Carpentier (French pronunciation: [ʒil kaʁpɑ̃tje]; 14 June 1950, Paris – 16 September 2016) was a French writer and editor.

== Biography ==
After various menial jobs at the PTT or in the cinema, then a journalist with the cultural section of Rouge in the 1970s, where he published numerous chronicles on free jazz, Carpentier also became a reader for the Éditions du Seuil. In charge of the manuscript service and member of its reading committee from 1981, he was a full-fledged publisher in 1992 and until 2003. He discovered Agota Kristof with the novel The Notebook which became a great success in France and also the writer Abdelhak Serhane. He also edited numerous African and Francophone authors including Aimé Césaire (whose complete poetry he edited), Ahmadou Kourouma, Sony Labou Tansi, Kateb Yacine, Kossi Efoui, or Tierno Monenembo.

Éditions du Seuil greeted him as an "immense reader and discoverer of talent".

He was also the author of six books, which were all in one way or another about one of his favorite subjects, the contemporary city. His latest novel, Les Bienveillantes [not to be mistaken with J. Littell's eponymous work (2006)] is written in an entirely dialogued form.

Les Manuscrits de la marmotte published in 1984, earned him the Prix Fénéon for literature.

== Works ==
- 1984: Les Manuscrits de la marmotte, Éditions du Seuil, Prix Fénéon
- 1988: Tous couchés, Seuil
- 1992: Haussmann m'empêche de dormir, Seuil
- 1994: Scandale de bronze. Lettre à Aimé Césaire, Seuil
- 1999: Couper cabèche, Seuil
- 2002: Les Bienveillantes, Stock
