= Patrick Cahuzac =

French writer and editor (born 1963)

Patrick Cahuzac (born 1963 in Strasbourg, Bas-Rhin) is a French writer and editor.

Cahuzac published his first novel, Parole de singe, in 1990, in the series Le Chemin, established Georges Lambrichs, at éditions Gallimard. The book won the prix Fénéon for literature and an incentive award from the Centre national du livre.

In 1991, the author was a resident of the Villa Médicis in Rome. In 1993, he joined Gallimard as a member of the reading committee. He remained there until 1999, while advising Isabelle Gallimard, director of the Mercure de France, during the year 1997.

His second novel, L'Énergumène, was published by Gallimard in 1996. The author then spent several months in Japan (winner of the Villa Kujoyama, Kyoto, for his second novel).

On his return to France, in 1999, he founded the multimedia center of literary creation Inventaire/Invention within the Métafort d'Aubervilliers set up by Jack Ralite. Cahuzac was responsible for the editorial direction of this pioneering structure in the field of multimedia literature. He published more than a hundred contemporary authors, including François Bon, Albane Gellé, Emmanuel Adely, Tanguy Viel, Liliane Giraudon, and Arno Calleja.

In 2009, the activity of Inventaire/Invention, which went into judicial liquidation, ceased. Patrick Cahuzac then opened a bookshop in Saumur.

== Works ==
- 1990: Parole de singe, novel, Gallimard, prix Fénéon 1990
- 1996: L'énergumène, novel, Gallimard
- 1999: Le Désert de Brest, narrative, in Onze, Grasset/Les Inrockuptibles
- 2003: Résistance, 61 messages personnels présentés par…, Inventaire/Invention
