= Jean-Didier Wolfromm =

French novelist and literary critic

- Born: 21 May 1941; Paris
- Died: 26 January 1994 (aged 52); Paris
- Occupations: Novelist; Literary critic

Jean-Didier Wolfromm (21 May 1941 – 26 January 1994) was a 20th-century French novelist and literary critic.

== Biography ==
A former student at the École nationale supérieure des arts décoratifs, Wolfromm worked as a critic for Le Magazine Littéraire, France-Soir and L'Express. He collaborated in particular with the France Inter radio program, Le Masque et la Plume. His judgments were often caustic, even scathing. He had become a figure of the Parisian literary milieu. His work - especially his novel Diane Lanster - was the reflection of his existence, that of a man not much spoiled by nature (handicap plus chronic illness), for whom seduction was nothing obvious.

== Works ==
- 1978: Diane Lanster, Éditions Grasset, prix Interallié.
- 1989: La Leçon inaugurale, Grasset, prix Maurice Genevoix
