= Vigneaux =

Vigneaux may refer to:

- Caroline Vigneaux (born 1975), French actor, lawyer
- Nicolás Vigneaux (born 1997), Chilean actor
- Les Vigneaux, a French commune

== See also ==
- Vigneau (disambiguation)
