= Justine Augier =

French writer

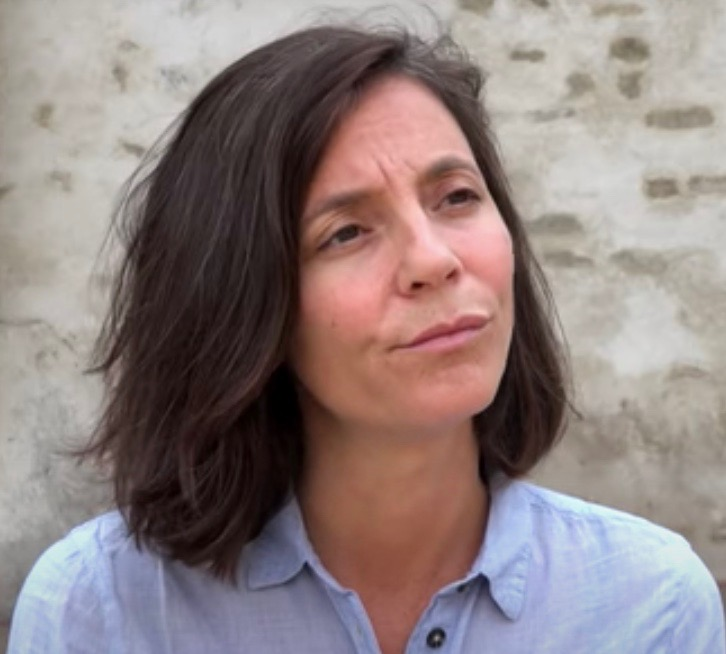

Justine Augier (born 1978) is a French writer, laureate of the 2011 edition of the Prix Fénéon with her novel En règle avec la nuit.

== Selected works ==
- 2008: Son absence, Paris, Stock 169 p. ISBN 978-2-234-06164-4
- 2010: En règle avec la nuit, Stock, 210 p. ISBN 978-2-234-06477-5

- Prix Fénéon 2011

- 2013: Jérusalem, Arles, Actes Sud, series "Un Endroit où aller", 164 p. ISBN 978-2-330-01939-6
- 2014: La Vie étonnante d’Ellis Spencer, Arles, Actes Sud, series "Ado : aventure", 141 p. ISBN 978-2-330-03088-9
- 2015: Les Idées noires, Arles, Actes Sud, series "Littérature française", 256 p. ISBN 978-2-330-04891-4
- 2017: De l'Ardeur, Arles, Actes Sud, séries "Littérature française, 320 p. ISBN 978-2-330-08203-1
