= Pierre Michael =

French actor

Pierre Michael (11 April 1932, Charleroi, Belgium-4 June 2001, Paris, France) was a French actor.

== Filmography ==
Year	Title	Role	Notes
1960	Le panier à crabes	Charles Dupré	
1960	Love and the Frenchwoman	Francois	(segment "Virginité, La")
1961	Saint Tropez Blues	Jacques Bargeron	
1962	Jusqu'à plus soif	Pierre 'Pierrot' Soulage	
1972	Le droit d'aimer	Le commandant	
1980	5% de risque	Jean Navy	
1981	Strange Affair	Gérard Doutre	
1982	The Passerby	Me Jouffroy	
1982	Légitime violence	Robert Andreatti - le responsable d'un mouvement d'extrême-droite	
1983	L'Africain	Le P.D.G	
1984	Dangerous Moves	Yachvili	
