= Jean-Philippe Salabreuil =

French poet

Jean-Philippe Salabreuil (25 May 1940 in Neuilly-sur-Seine – 27 February 1970 in Paris), real name Jean-Pierre Steinbach, was a French poet. His first book, La Liberté des feuilles, received awards in the name of Félix Fénéon and Max Jacob. He often wrote poems in prose. He died at the age of 29; it is possible that he committed suicide.

== Books ==
- La Liberté des feuilles, Gallimard, (1964)
- Juste retour d'abîme, Gallimard, (1965)
- L'Inespéré, Gallimard, (1969)
