= Nelly Kaplan =

Argentine-born French film director and writer (1931–2020)

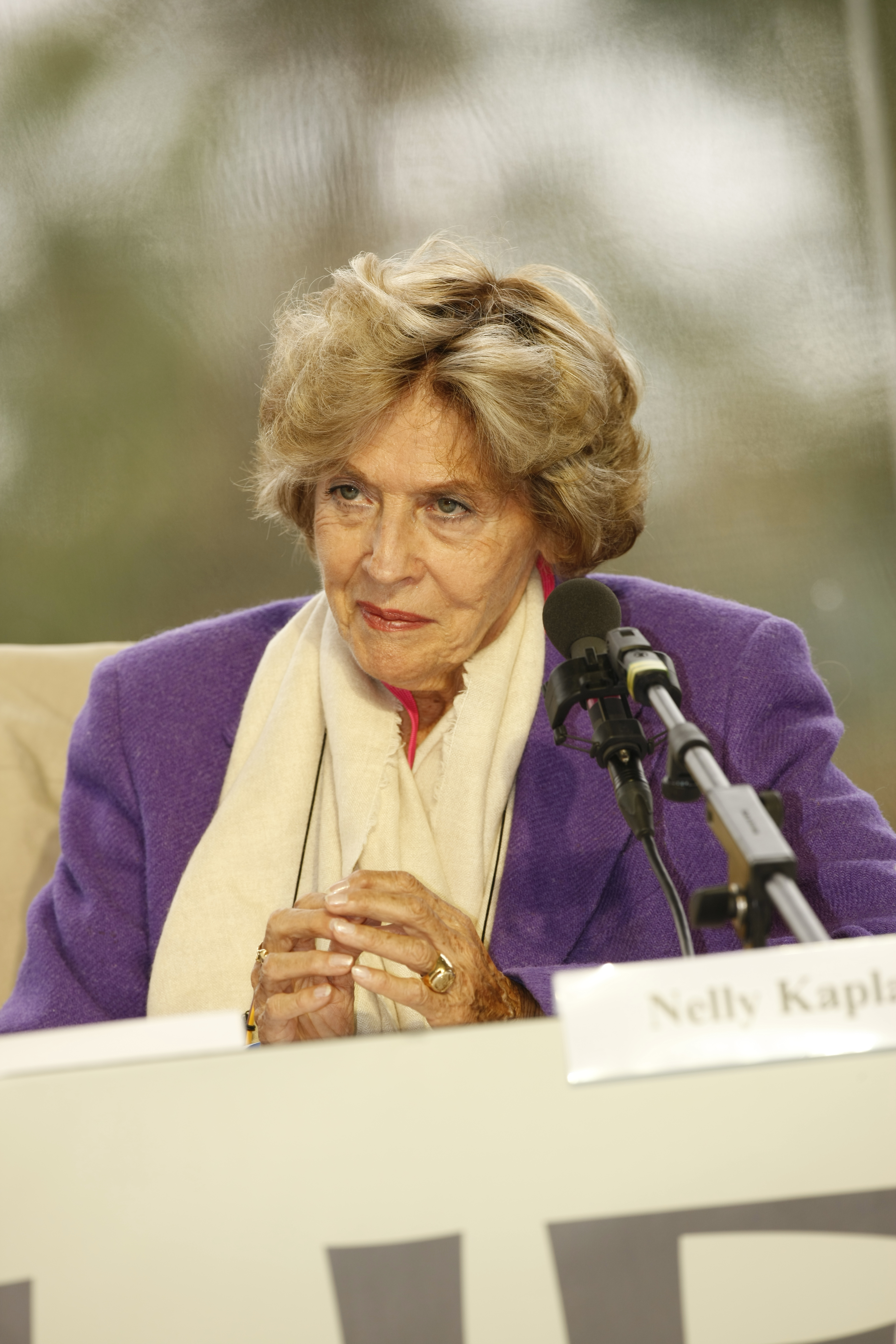
- Nelly Kaplan in 2009
- Born: 11 April 1931; Buenos Aires, Argentina
- Died: 12 November 2020 (aged 89); Geneva, Switzerland

Nelly Kaplan (11 April 1931 – 12 November 2020) was an Argentine-born French writer and film director who focused on the arts, film, and filmmakers. She studied economics at the University of Buenos Aires. Passionate about cinema, she abruptly put her studies on hold to go to Paris in 1953 to represent the new Argentine film archive at an international convention and later became a correspondent for different Argentine newspapers. She had arrived with a resume highlighting her journalistic experience and a letter of introduction to Henri Langlois, founder and curator of the Cinémathèque Française, who introduced her to Abel Gance. Gance gave her the opportunity to work on the film La tour de Nesle.

She became Gance's assistant during the film and made and showed the program Magirama (triple screen) in Polyvision, then, still at Gance's side, she collaborated with him on Austerlitz (1960). He trusted her with the direction of all the second crew's action scenes during the filming of his movie Cyrano and d'Artagnan (Cyrano et d'Artagnan, 1964).

Meanwhile, she published her work about Magirama under the name Le Manifeste d'un art nouveau, with a preface by Philippe Soupault. In 1960, she published a film report entitled Le Sunlight of Austerlitz, through the Plon publishing house.

Beginning in 1961, she directed an entire series of art shorts, which won numerous prizes in various international festivals. Among these shorts were "Gustave Moreau," an analysis of the 19th century symbolist painter; "Rudolphe Bresdin," the engraver; "Dessins et merveilles," on the sketchbooks of Victor Hugo, as well as "Les années 25 ", " La Nouvelle Orangerie ", "Abel Gance hier et demain ", " A la source, la femme aimée", titles based on the secret notebooks of the painter André Masson.

Her first feature movie, A Very Curious Girl, was the focus of a Kaplan retrospective in 2019, Wild Things: The Ferocious Films of Nelly Kaplan. She filmed and produced a 1966 documentary, The Picasso Look, about the works of Picasso being delivered and displayed in Paris.

== Biography ==
Nelly Kaplan was born in Buenos Aires, Argentina to a Jewish family. A "neo-surrealist," she was "the only female film maker linked with surrealism." Kaplan left for France at the age of 21. She served as a professor and lecturer at Institut des Hautes Études en Arts Plastiques.Her works are often female-centered and approach eroticism from a woman's point of view.

Her films have been shown at many international festivals. As a member of the SACD, she took part in the board of directors as a member of the Cinema Commission on several occasions. Kaplan regularly collaborated on the show "Des Papous dans la Tête," on France Culture. She contributed to the cinema section of the magazine Le Magazine Littéraire for 25 years. Kaplan was Commander of the Arts and Letters, Officer in the National Merite Order, Cavalier of the Legion of Honor, and Academician of the Alphonse Allais Academy.

Nelly Kaplan died from COVID-19 at a nursing home in Geneva on 12 November 2020 aged 89, just 3 month later that her husband Claude Makoski.

== Career ==
In 1965, under the pen-name of Belen, she published a collection of short stories through the J.J. Pauvert Publishing House. Le Réservoir des sens, was a great critical and popular success. Two years later, in 1967, during the retrospective organized at the Grand Palais for Pablo Picasso's 85th birthday, she directed a mid-length feature in color, Le Regard Picasso, which won a Golden Lion at the Venice Film Festival.

In 1968, she collaborated with Claude Makovski on the script for the movie La Fiancée du pirate, which she directed in 1969. In collaboration with Claude Makovski and René Guyonnet, she wrote the adaptation of Papa, les petits bateaux, which she filmed during the summer of 1971. Over the next few years, she published a ciné-roman Le Collier de Ptyx (1972) and Un Manteau de fou-rire ou les Mémoires d'une liseuse de draps (1974; through the J.J. Pauvert Publishing House). The book presented problems with a prudish censure.

Kaplan also remained active in cinema. In 1974, Kaplan co-wrote the script of Claude Makovski's film Il faut vivre dangereusement, which she also produced. In 1976, she wrote with Jean Chapot the script for Néa, which she filmed in Switzerland and Paris in March of that year. In 1979, she co-wrote Charles et Lucie with Jean Chapot and Claude Makovski, which she shot in spring of the same year. Between 1980 and 1982, she co-wrote scripts for several TV movies directed by Jean Chapot, including Un fait d'hiver, Livingstone, and Ce fut un bel été. In 1983, she wrote and directed Abel Gance et son Napoleon. This film was selected for the 1984 Cannes Film Festival, official selection "Un Certain Regard." In 1984 she co-wrote the script for Regard dans un miroir, directed by Jean Chapot (Grand Prize of the Foundation of France).

In 1985 she directed Pattes de velours, which originated from an original script co-written with Jean Chapot. Pierre Arditi, Michel Bouquet, Bernadette Lafont, Caroline Sihol, and Roger Carrel were the performers.

A new extended version of her collection Le Réservoir des sens was published by the J.J. Pauvert Publishing House in 1988. In 1990, she co-wrote the TV movie Les Mouettes with Jean Chapot, who also directed it. It had the highest audience in France for a TV movie. In 1990–1991, she wrote and directed Plaisir d'amour with Pierre Arditi, Francoise Fabian, Dominique Blanc, Heinz Bennent, and Pierre Dux. This movie, whose script was written in collaboration with Jean Chapot, was produced by Claude Makovski through Cythère Films. As a co-writer of the script for Jean Chapot's TV movie Honorin et la Lorelei, they achieved a new record audience level in November 1992. The movie scored 4 nominations at the 7 d'or festival. In 1992, she co-wrote the script for Polly West est de retour with Jean Chapot, who also directed it. In 1993, she co-wrote the fourth installment of the "saga" of Saint Apollonia with Jean Chapot, Honorin et l'enfant prodigue, directed by Chapot.

In 1994, she wrote, at the request of the British Film Institute for their collection BFI Classics, an essay on the film Napoléon by Abel Gance. In 1994 as well, the Museum of Fine Arts, Boston, the Art Institute of Chicago, and the National Gallery of Washington organized a retrospective of all Kaplan's films. In April 1995, a new edition of Réservoir des sens, followed by La Gardienne du temps were released through the Castor Astral publishing house.

In 1996 she was made Chevalier dans l'Ordre National de la Légion d'Honneur.

1997 saw the release of Georges Sebbag's book, Le Point sublime: Breton/Rimbaud/Kaplan (Jean-Michel Place). In February of the same year, the Lumière Institute in Lyon dedicated a homage to her, with a screening of her films. At the end of 1997 and beginning of 1998, Kaplan wrote for and with Jean Chapot the script for the TV movie La Petite fille en costume marin, broadcast by France 2. March 1998 saw the publication of her novel Aux Orchidées sauvages, published by Différence. In November 1998, her novel Un Manteau de fou-rire was released by Différence.

In 1999, the Film Library of Toulouse and the School of Beaux-Arts paid homage to her literary and film repertoire and in February 2000, the Film Library of Lausanne organized a retrospective of her repertoire of films up to that point.

In June 2000, the "Cahiers Philippe Soupault No. 3" published a very long interview with Kaplan, as well as different excerpts of her literary and film works.

In 2002, her novel Ils furent une étrange comète was published by Castor Astral. In September of that year, the Balzac cinema in Paris held a program entitled "Kaplan dans tous ses états," a festival of her principal films. This festival would be followed by a national broadcast. On the same date, her biography, Nelly Kaplan, portrait d'une flibustière, by Denys-Louis Colaux, was published by Dreamland. In December, the University of Paris 8 organized a colloquium around her literary and film work: Nelly Kaplan, le verbe et la lumière. The texts of this colloquium were published by L'Harmattan in June 2003.

At the end of 2004, a six DVD set was released by Opening, containing a large number of her film works. (In 2007, this set was re-released under the title Les Films de ma vie/The Films of My Life.)

In January 2005 her novel Cuisses de grenouille was released by Maren Sell, for which Kaplan prepared a film adaptation.

In May 2008, the book Mon Cygne, mon signe, chronicling her correspondence with Abel Gance, was published, followed by her novel Et Pandore en avait deux !, published by Rocher.

In May 2009, her correspondence with the writer André Pieyre de Mandiargues, under the title Ecris-moi tes hauts faits et tes crimes, was published by Tallandier.

== Books and movies ==
=== Fiction ===
- La géométrie dans les spasmes (under the pen-name Belen), Le Terrain Vague, 1959.
- La Reine des sabbats (under the pen-name Belen), Le Terrain Vague, 1960.
- «...et délivrez nous du mâle» (under the pen-name Belen), Le Terrain Vague, 1960.
- Le Réservoir des sens, nouvelles, La Jeune Parque, 1966; rééd. J-J.Pauvert, 1988; rééd. augmentée Le Castor Astral, 1995.
- Le Collier de Ptyx, ciné-roman, J-J.Pauvert, 1971.
- Mémoires d'une liseuse de draps, roman, J-J.Pauvert, 1974.
- Aux Orchidées sauvages, roman, La Différence, 1998.
- Un Manteau de fou rire, roman, La Différence, 1998.
- Ils furent une étrange comète, roman, Le Castor Astral, 2002.
- Cuisses de grenouille, roman, Maren Sell Editeurs, 2005
- Et Pandore en avait deux..! followed by Mon Cygne, mon Signe, Editions du Rocher, 2008
- Ecris-moi tes hauts faits et tes crimes… Correspondance avec André Pieyre de Mandiargues, Editions du Rocher, 2009

=== Essays on cinema ===
- Manifeste d'un art nouveau: la Polyvision, Caractères, 1955.
- Le Sunlight d'Austerlitz, journal d'un tournage, Plon, 1960.
- Napoleon, British Film Institute Classics, 1994.

== Filmography ==
Documentaries

- Gustave Moreau, 1961
- Rodolphe Bresdin, 1962
- Abel Gance, hier et demain, 1963
- La Nouvelle Orangerie, 1965
- Les Années 25, 1965
- Dessins et merveilles, 1966
- À la Source, la femme aimée, 1966
- Le Regard Picasso, 1967
- Abel Gance y su Napoléon, 1983

Fiction

- 1969: La Fiancée du pirate (A Very Curious Girl)
- 1971: Papa les p'tits bateaux
- 1976: Néa
- 1979: Charles et Lucie
- 1985: Patte de velours (TV)
- 1991: Plaisir d'amour

Co-writer of the film Il faut vivre dangereusement, by Claude Makovski, 1974.

Co-writer of Jean Chapot's téléfilms:

- Livingstone, 1980
- Un fait d'hiver, 1981
- La Tentation d'Antoine, 1981
- Ce fut un bel été, 1982
- Meurtre sans pourboire, 1983
- Le Regard dans le miroir, 1984
- Le Crépuscule des loups, 1986
- Les Mouettes, 1989
- Honorin et la Loreleï, 1991
- Polly West est de retour, 1993
- Honorin et l'enfant prodigue, 1994.
- La Petite fille en costume marin, 1997.

Collaborated over 22 years to the Magazine Littéraire with a column on film adaptations from books.

== Bibliography ==
- Antle, Martine (2003). "Dedans et dehors: Le Cas de Nelly Kaplan et d'Abel Gance". Mélusine. 23: 87–95.
- Béhar, Stella. "L'Ecriture surréaliste de Nelly Kaplan." La Femme s'entête: La Part du féminin dans le surréalisme. Paris, France: Lachenal & Ritter, 1998. 275–289.
- Calle-Gruber, Mireille. Nelly Kaplan : la verbe et la lumière. Paris: L'Harmattan, 2004.
- Colaux, Denis-Louis. Grandes machines et spéculations introspectives. Bruxelles: Labor, 2003.
- Colaux, Denis-Louis. Nelly Kaplan : portrait d'une flibustière. Paris: Dreamland, 2002.
- Duby, Georges, and Michelle Perrot. History of Women in the West Vol. 5 : Toward a Cultural Identity in the Twentieth Century. Ed. Françoise Thébaud. New York: Belknap P, 1994.
- Elley, Derek. “Hiding it Under a Bushel”, Films and Filming, 20.4 (1974): 22–5
- Giukin, Lenuta (2003). "Demystification and Webtopia in the Films of Nelly Kaplan". Cinema Journal. 42 (3): 96–113. doi:10.1353/cj.2003.0008. JSTOR 1225906. S2CID 194081523. Gale A160418799 Project MUSE 43020 ProQuest 1676105.
- Greene, Linda (March 1975). "A Very Curious Girl: Politics of a Feminist Fantasy". Jump Cut. 6: 13–14.
- Holmlund, C (Winter 1996). "The eyes of Nelly Kaplan". Screen. 37 (4): 351–367. doi:10.1093/screen/37.4.351.
- Houston, Beverly. “Néa”, Film Quarterly, 32.3 (1979): 46–9.
- Johnston, Claire. “Women’s cinema as counter cinema”. Notes on Women’s Cinema. London: Society for Education in Film and Television, 1973. 25; reprinted in Bill Nichols ed., Movies and Methods: an Anthology. Berkeley: University of California Press, 1975. 210.
- Kay, Karin. “The Revenge of Pirate Jenny.” Velvet Light Trap 9 (Summer 1973): 46–9.
- Lejeune, Paula. Le cinéma des femmes. Paris: Atlas Lherminier, 1987.
- Mandiargues, Andre Pieyre de. “Nelly Kaplan”, Obliques 14-15 (1973), p. 70.
- Rosen, Marjorie. “Women, Sex and Power”, Millimeter, vol. 4 (January 1976): 36–37.
- Sebbag, Georges. Le point sublime : André Breton, Arthur Rimbaud, Nelly Kaplan. Paris: Jean-Michel Place, 1997.
- Vincendeau, Ginette. "Fathers and Daughters in French Cinema: From the 20s to 'La Belle Noiseuse." Women and Film: A Sight and Sound Reader, edited by Pam Cook and Phillip Dodd, Philadelphia, 1993
- Waldman, Diane. “The Eternal Return of Circe.” Velvet Light Trap, no. 9 (Summer 1973): 49–51.
- Wells, Gwendolyn. "Deviant Games." L'Esprit Createur 31.4 (Winter 1991): 69–77.

== See also ==
- Lists of writers
