= Alice Renard =

French author

- Born: 2002 (age 23–24); Paris
- Occupations: Writer, Novelist
- Writing career
- Notable awards: Prix Méduse 2023 for La Colère et l'Envie Prix littéraire de la vocation 2023 for La Colère et l'Envie Prix Maurice-Genevoix 2024 for La Colère et l'Envie Prix Goncourt de la nouvelle 2026 for Peaux vives

Alice Renard is a French author, born in 2002, in Paris.

Alice Renard's work has won her a number of literary awards, including the 2026 Prix Goncourt de la Nouvelle, for Peaux Vives and the 2024 Prix Maurice-Genevoix for La Colère et l'Envie.

== Biography ==
=== Youth and education ===
Alice Renard is the daughter of a personal stylist and a mathematics teacher. She gained a scientific Baccalauréat, then undertook studies in medieval literature at the Sorbonne.

=== Writing ===
Because of her background, she says she is interested in the issues of neurodiversity and sensory processing sensitivity. At 14, she began to write articles that she addressed to Léopoldine, a fictitious interlocutor ("Léopoldine, une destinatrice fictive").

She published her first novel, La Colère et l'Envie (Rage and Desire), on August 24, 2023. The novel is constructed in three parts, initially recording the thoughts of Isor's conflicted parents as they do their best to bring up a non-verbal child, then her elderly neighbour relating their friendship, before Isor's voice takes over in an epistolary finale. It has been said to "[advocate] for radical freedom of expression, even if it goes against cartesian sense". It has been nominated for numerous literary prizes, including the Prix Femina 2023, and the Prix littéraire du Monde 2023 - it received the Prix Méduse in 2023, the Prix littéraire de la vocation, the Prix Maurice-Genevoix 2024, as well as the Grand Cru Chartreuse 2024 Prize, awarded by the Centre national des écritures du spectacle (National Centre for Performing Arts Writing).

== Work ==
=== Novel ===
- La Colère et l'Envie, Héloïse d'Ormesson, 2023 ISBN 9782350878966.

=== Short stories ===
- Peaux vives, Héloïse d'Ormesson, 2025 ISBN 9782487819528.
