= Thierry Laget =

French writer

- Born: October 2, 1959 (age 66); Clermont-Ferrand, France
- Occupations: Novelist, essayist, literary critic, translator
- Writing career
- Notable works: Iris, La Lanterne d'Aristote, Proust, Prix Goncourt. Une émeute littéraire
- Notable awards: Prix Fénéon (1992); Prix Maurice Genevoix (2012); Prix Céleste Albaret (2019)
- Website: www.thierrylaget.com

Thierry Laget (born 2 October 1959, Clermont-Ferrand) is a French novelist, essayist, literary critic and translator.

== Biography ==
A regular contributor to the Théodore Balmoral, Laget participated to the edition of À la recherche du temps perdu in the bibliothèque de la Pléiade, under the direction of Jean-Yves Tadié. He has provided editions of texts by Jacques Rivière including Quelques progrès dans l'étude du cœur humain, by Marcel Proust, including Le Côté de Guermantes and Les plaisirs et les jours, then Gustave Flaubert including Madame Bovary. Thierry has also published several essays on Proust.

He translated from Italian some fifteen books, among which are three novels by Enzo Siciliano including La Nuit marâtre, La Princesse et l'Antiquaire then Les Beaux Moments as well as the novel Passage dans l'ombre by Maria Teresa Di Lascia, and novels by Alessandro Barbero, including La belle vie, ou les aventures de Mr Pyle, gentilhomme, Roman russe and Poète à la barre.

== Prizes ==
- 1992: prix Fénéon for Iris (Éditions Gallimard, 1991)
- 2012: prix Maurice Genevoix for La Lanterne d'Aristote (Gallimard, 2011)
- 2019: prix Céleste Albaret for Proust, Prix Goncourt. Une émeute littéraire (Gallimard, 2019)

== Bibliography ==
Novels

- Florence, via Ricasoli 47 (Belfond, 1987)
- Comme Tosca au théâtre (Belfond, 1989)
- Iris (Gallimard, 1991) - prix Fénéon 1992
- Rois d'Avanie (Julliard, 1995)
- Roman écrit à la main (Gallimard, 2000)
- Supplément aux mensonges d'Hilda (Gallimard, 2003)
- Madame Deloblat (Gallimard, 2006)
- La Lanterne d'Aristote (Gallimard, 2011) – prix Maurice Genevoix 2012

Prose

- Florentiana (Gallimard, 1993)
- Bergers d'Arcadie, méditations en prose, eaux-fortes de Christiane Vielle (Fata Morgana, 1995)
- La Fiancée italienne, (biographie d'Alaïde Banti, liée au mouvement des Macchiaioli) (Gallimard, 1997)
- À des dieux inconnus (Gallimard, 2003) ISBN 978-2-07-076857-8
- Les Quais minéraliers, poème en prose, aquatintes de Christiane Vielle (Al Manar, 2004)
- Portraits de Stendhal (Gallimard, 2008) ISBN 978-2-07-012000-0
- Bibliothèques de nuit (Gallimard, 2010) ISBN 978-2-07-012926-3
- Provinces (L'Arbre vengeur, 2013)
- Atlas des amours fugaces (L'Arbre vengeur, 2013)
- Le ciel est un grand timide (Fario, coll. Théodore Balmoral, 2016)ISBN 9-791091-902281

Poetry

- Semer son ombre (Al Manar, 2008)

Texts issued in the magazine Théodore Balmoral

- Parques de Sceaux, n°51
- Douje mou de patué, n°52/53
- Les Yeux au ciel, n°56/57
- Paysage de Dalécarlie, n°58
- Ne pas déranger, n°59/60
- Le Songe de Polyphème, n°61
- L’Attente, n°62/63
- Sur le limbe du sextant, n°64
- Deux maisons, n°65
- Les Copeaux, n°66/67
- Sur le limbe du sextant (2), n°68
- En chemin, n°69/70
- Bialot, l’inoubliable, n°71
- Rouge Follain, n°72/73
- Sur le limbe du sextant (3), n°72/73
- Les Voyages en zig-zag de Pierre Girard, n°72/73
- Discours de Stockholm, n°74
