= Stéphane Audeguy =

French novelist and essayist

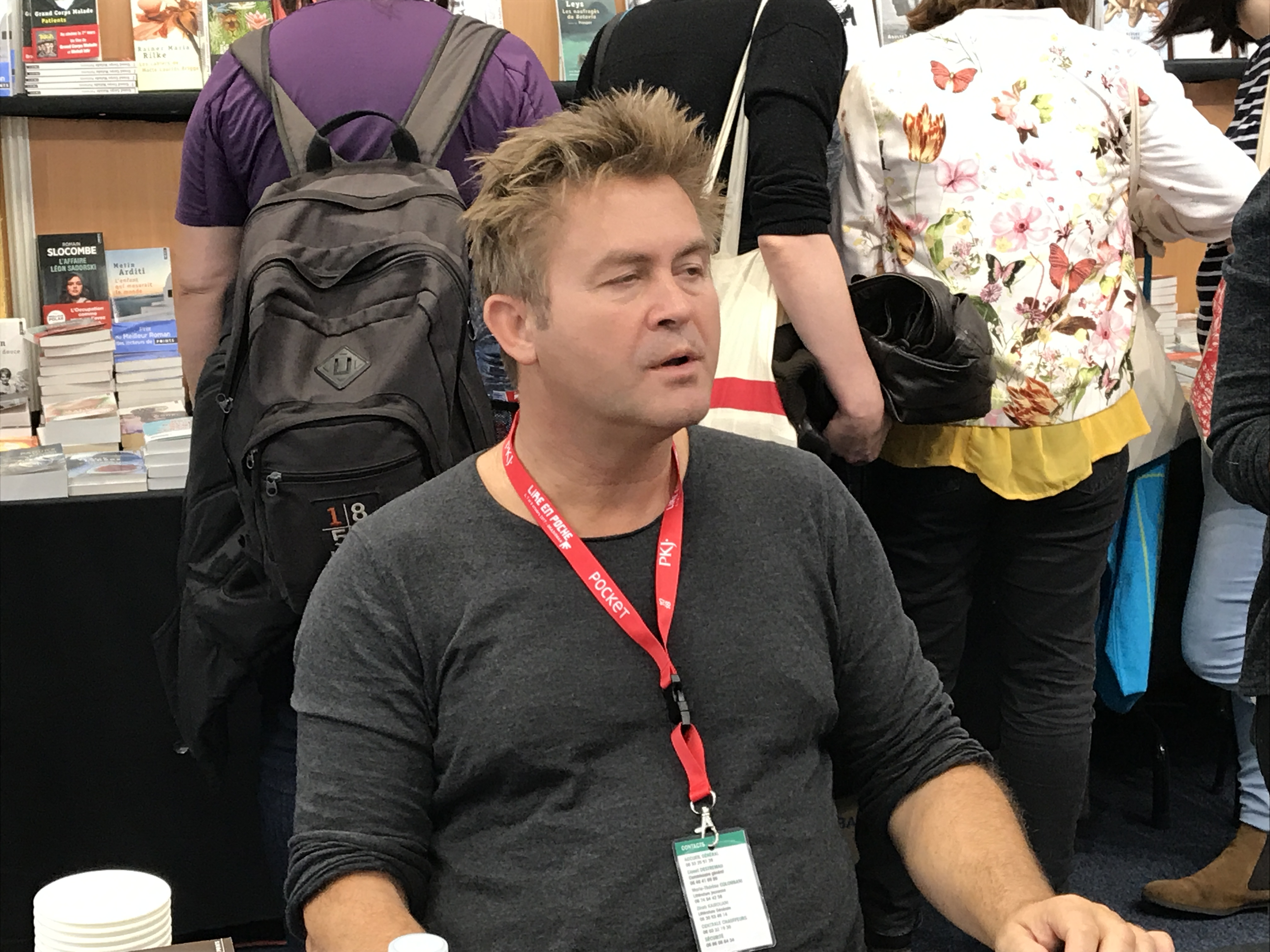
- Born: 1964 (age 61–62)
- Occupations: French novelist and essayist
- Known for: Award of Prix Maurice Genevoix from the French Academy, for La théorie des nuages; Award of Prix des Deux Magots, for Fils Unique

Stéphane Audeguy (born 1964 Tours) is a French novelist and essayist.

He studied literature at the University of Paris, where he also taught. He served as an assistant professor at the University of Virginia at Charlottesville between 1986 and 1987. He returned to France and now lives in Paris where he teaches art history and film history at a local high school.

== Awards ==
- Prix Maurice Genevoix from the French Academy, for La théorie des nuages
- Prix des Deux Magots, for Fils Unique

== Works ==
- Les monstres : Si loin si proches, Gallimard, coll. Découvertes Gallimard (n° 520), 2007, ISBN 9782070341245
- La théorie des nuages (The Theory of Clouds) Translator Timothy Bent ISBN 978-0-15-101428-6
- Fils Unique (Only Son). Translator John Cullen ISBN 978-0-15-101329-6
- Rom@
