= Rose Vincent =

French journalist (1918–2011)

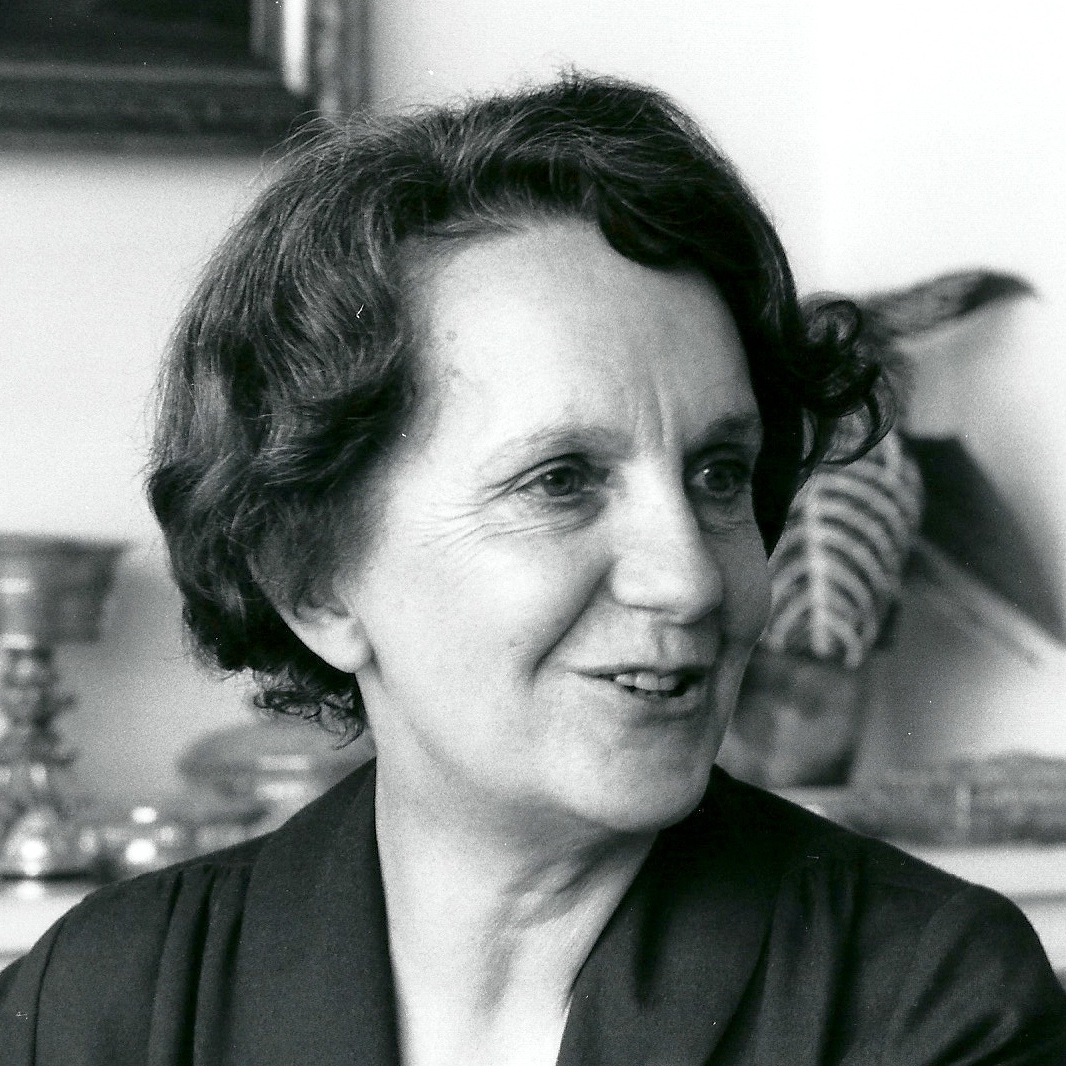
- Rose Vincent ca 1985
- Born: Marie Rose Treffot; 15 August 1918; Sainte-Croix, Saône-et-Loire
- Died: 15 June 2011 (aged 92); Clamart (Hauts-de-Seine)
- Occupations: Journalist; Writer

Rose Vincent (pseudonym for Marie Rose Treffot-Jurgensen; née Treffot; 15 March 1918 – 15 June 2011) was a French journalist and writer.

Originally from Bresse Louhanaise, she worked as a teacher and served in the Resistance during the Second World War. She became a journalist and writer after the war.

She wrote numerous works on the education of children as well as works on India, where she lived for 4 years, and novels, which received several awards.

== Biography ==
The daughter of teachers in the Louhans region, where she spent her childhood, Marie Rose Treffot graduated from the École normale supérieure de Sèvres, (1937) and obtained the agrégation of mathematics (1940–41).

In 1939, she married Jean-Daniel Jurgensen.

She taught at Dreux and Chartres (1940–43), while engaging in the Resistance, within the network "Defense de la France". In 1943 she went into hiding and worked in particular with the Cahiers de Défense de la France.

After the Liberation, she worked on the daily newspaper France-Soir, which grew out of the clandestine newspaper Défense de la France and worked on the creation of the magazine France et Monde. In 1951, she joined the editorial office of the women's weekly Elle, where she led the "Parents-enfants" section until 1973. At the same time, she became editor-in-chief of Votre Enfant (1954–1958) and Femina Pratique (1957).

In 1958, Vincent founded the monthly Femme Pratique, of which she was the director and editor-in-chief until 1972.

She also published several books on the education of children.

She worked at promoting the cause of women's emancipation. She moved to India (1972–1976) and the Netherlands (1979–1982) with her husband, the Ambassador of France, and began a career as a writer.

In 1976, she participated in the launch of the daily J'informe, established by Joseph Fontanet.

After her return to France, she published several historical works and novels, which won her many prizes, including the prix Maurice Genevoix.

In the last years of her life, she stayed mainly in Uzès (Gard), where she wrote her last works and devoted time to the restoration of the Mas de Mayac (Inventaire supplémentaire des monuments historiques).

== Works ==
- 1957: with Roger Mucchielli. Comment connaitre votre enfant. Le Livre de Poche.
- 1962: L'éducation des enfants. Hachette.
- 1965: with Denise Hubert. Les coudes sur la table. Hachette.
- 1969: Connaissance de l'enfant. Éditions Denoël.
- 1971: Le Métier de mère. Centurion/Grasset.
- 1978: Mohini ou l'Inde des femmes. Le Seuil. 1977. ISBN 2-02-004709-8., Prix Auguste Furtado, Prix littéraire de l'Asie in 1978)
- 1981: A la découverte de votre enfant. Retz.
- 1982: Le Temps d'un royaume. Le Seuil. 1982. ISBN 2-02-006207-0.
- 1985: Le soleil et la roue. Le Seuil. 1985. ISBN 2-02-008676-X. Prix Jules Favre; Prix RTL; Prix du récit historique; Prix des Pays Protestants
- 1987: L'adieu aux Champs. Le Seuil. ISBN 2-02-009636-6. Prix Maurice Genevoix; Prix Emile Guillaumin; Prix de culture Bourguignonne
- 1989: The French in India.
- 1992: L'Enfant de Port-Royal. Le Seuil. 1991. ISBN 2-02-013545-0.
- 1993 Collaboration (1993). Pondichery, l'échec d'un rêve d'empire. Autrement. ISBN 2-86260-433-X.
- 1995: Collaboration (1995). L'aventure des Français en Inde. Kailash. ISBN 2-909052-71-0.
- 1996: Vert est le Paradis. Le Seuil. 1996. ISBN 2-02-026241-X.
- 2000: La perle du Cardinal. Le Seuil. 2000. ISBN 2-02-034198-0.

== Bibliography ==
- Velay, Serge; Boissard, Michel; Bernié-Boissard, Catherine (2009). Petit dictionnaire des écrivains du Gard (in French). Nîmes: Alcide. pp. 245–246.

== Honours and distinctions ==
- Chevalier of the Légion d'honneur
- Holder of the Resistance Medal
- Chevalier of the Ordre des Palmes Académiques
