= Jean-Louis Hue =

French journalist and writer (born 1949)

Jean-Louis Hue (born 22 April 1949 in Évreux) is a French journalist and writer.

Hue studied law and journalism. A freelancer for the magazines Actuel and Lui, he later was appointed deputy editor-in-chief of the ecological monthly Le Sauvage. During the 1980s, he joined Le Magazine Littéraire where he succeeded Jean-Jacques Brochier in 2004 as head of the editorial staff.

Jean-Louis Hue is writer Gaspard Koenig's father.

== Publications ==
- 1982: Le Chat dans tous ses états, Grasset, (Prix Fénéon)
- 1987: Dernières nouvelles du Père Noël, in collaboration with Anne-Marie Koenig, Grasset, Prix Goncourt de la nouvelle
- 2010: L'apprentissage de la marche, Grasset
