= Celou Arasco =

French writer

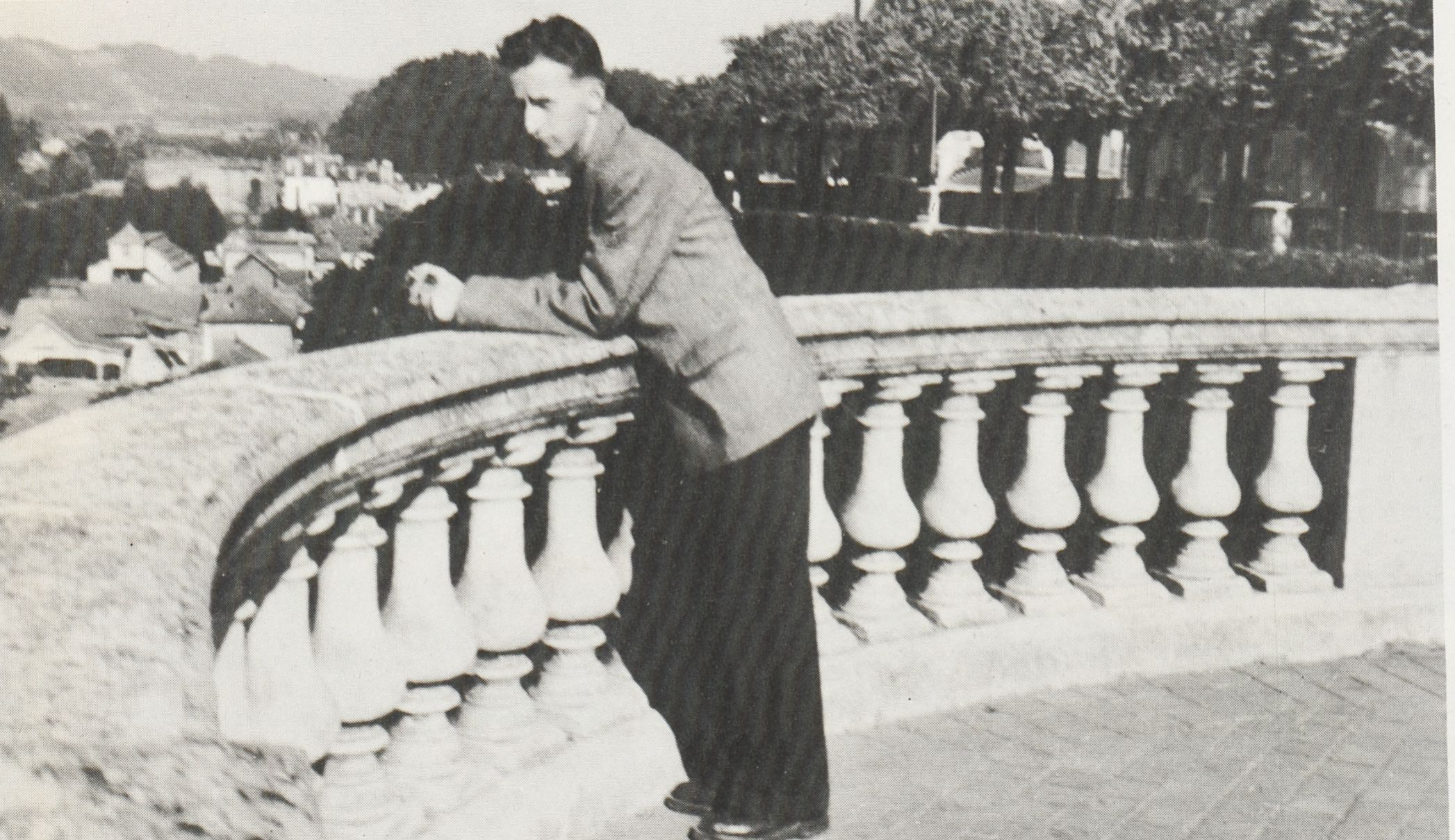
Celou Arasco

Celou Arasco (1921–1951, Pau, Pyrénées-Atlantiques) was a 20th-century French writer, whose mother was from Béarn and father of Spanish origin, who died from tuberculosis.

After studies with the religious, he occupied various jobs before working in a bookshop in Pau.

He wrote four books, the last of which remained unfinished.

He is mentioned in Le palais d'hiver, novel by Roger Grenier published in 1965.

== Works ==
- 1948: La Côte des malfaisants, Éditions Julliard, (Prix Fénéon 1950)
- 1949: Terrain vague, Julliard
- 1950: Les Joies de la tulipe, Julliard
- Les deux amis and Toujours plus haut, in Contes Béarnais illustrés par Roger at Éditions E. Plumon
