= New York Institute of Photography =

American for-profit online photography school

Coordinates: 40°43′59.5″N 73°59′34″W

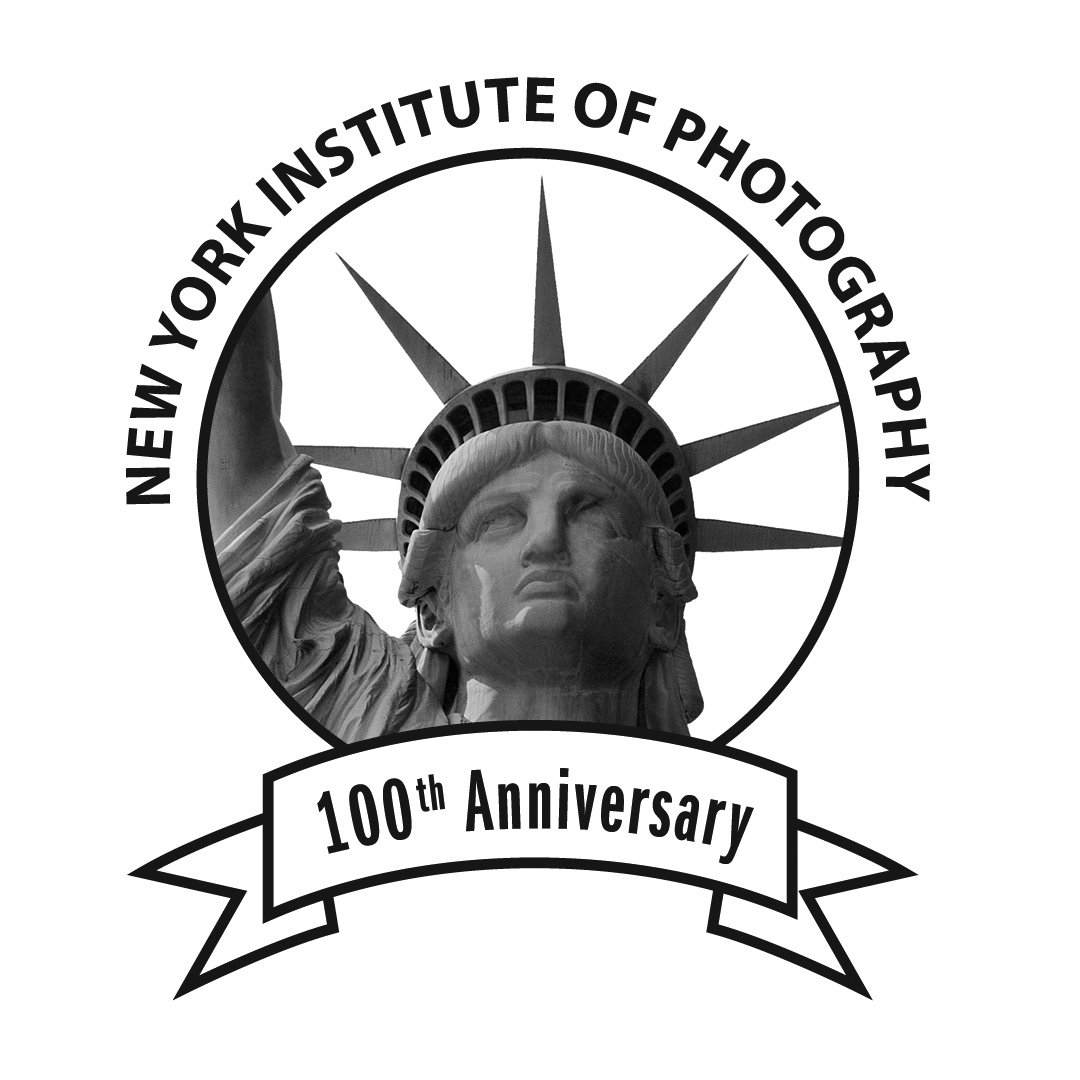
- Motto: The World's Largest Online Photography School
- Type: Private, For Profit
- Established: 1910
- Location: New York City, New York, United States
- Website: www.nyip.edu

The New York Institute of Photography (or NYIP) is a for-profit online school based out of New York City, offering different courses in photography to students all over the world. NYIP currently offers ten courses in photography.

== History ==
The New York Institute of Photography was founded in 1910, according to early brochures, by Emile Brunel. At the time, he named the school the E. Brunel School of Photography. Emile was a sculptor/artist/photographer best known for his celebrity portraits.

NYIP was officially registered as a business with the Supreme Course of the State of New York in 1915.

In its early days, NYIP was a residential school, with offices in Manhattan, Brooklyn, and Chicago. The instructors were always professional photographers. The Manhattan offices, where the main course was originally developed covered 15,000 square feet (1,400 m^{2}) of space. A home study course was added in the 1940s but was not as popular as the face to face lectures.

NYIP was first given educational accreditation when the National Home Study Council announced its inaugural class in 1956. Around that time the company was bought by Harold Deckoff, who was a printer who established the Tribune Publishing Co.

In 1971, shortly after Harold Deckoff's death, NYIP went bankrupt. Marvin Deckoff, Harold's son, bought the rights to continue the business. In 1976, he sold the business to Don Sheff. Marvin and Don worked together to rebuild the business from the ground up. They rewrote course materials, began trying different types of advertising, and worked on expanding the home study courses.

In addition to the courses, the New York Institute of Photography has printed a number of books on various photography subjects, including Motion Picture Directing and Motion Picture Photography.

In 2012, the New York Institute of Photography announced that it was partnering with Distance Education Russia, to create a Russian-language version of its Complete Course in Professional Photography.

== Notable graduates ==
- Anthony Barboza
- Ernest Cole
- Floyd Crosby
- Hahn Dae-soo
- Glenn Danzig
- Frank Espada
- L. Ron Hubbard
- David Michael Kennedy
- Josaphat-Robert Large
- Paul A Kline
- Robert H. McNeill
- Burim Myftiu
- W. Eugene Smith

== Accreditation ==
The New York Institute of Photography is nationally accredited to provide distance education training by the Distance Education Accrediting Commission (DEAC). In addition, since the school is based in New York, it is licensed by the New York State Department of Education.

The Better Business Bureau gives the New York Institute of Photography an A rating.
