= Sainte-Croix-en-Bresse =

- Commune
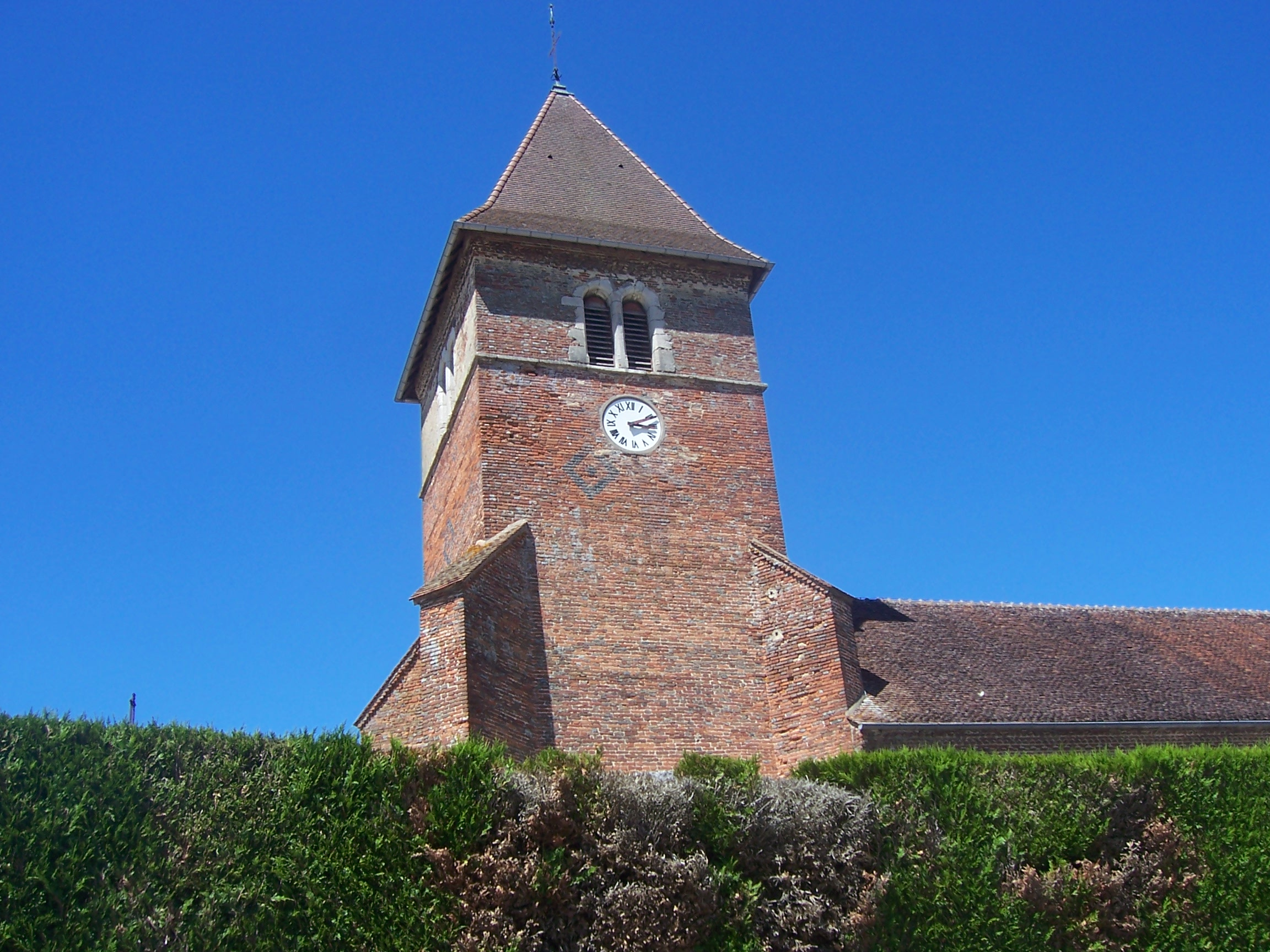
- The church in Sainte-Croix-en-Bresse

- Coat of arms
- Location of Sainte-Croix-en-Bresse
- Location within France Location within Bourgogne-Franche-Comté
- Coordinates: 46°34′21″N 5°14′49″E
- Country: France
- Region: Bourgogne-Franche-Comté
- Department: Saône-et-Loire
- Arrondissement: Louhans
- Canton: Cuiseaux
- Area^{1}: 20.87 km^{2} (8.06 sq mi)
- Elevation: 185 m (607 ft)
- Highest elevation: 210 m (690 ft)
- Lowest elevation: 177 m (581 ft)
- Population (2023): 655
  - Density: 31.4/km^{2} (81.3/sq mi)
- Time zone: UTC+01:00 (CET)
  - Summer (DST): UTC+02:00 (CEST)
- INSEE/Postal code: 71401 /71470
- ^{1} French Land Register data, which excludes lakes, ponds, glaciers > 1 km^{2} (0.386 sq mi or 247 acres) and river estuaries.

Sainte-Croix-en-Bresse (French pronunciation: [sɛ̃t kʁwa ɑ̃ bʁɛs], literally Sainte-Croix in Bresse; before 2020: Sainte-Croix) is a commune in the Saône-et-Loire department in the region of Bourgogne-Franche-Comté in eastern France. The writer Rose Vincent (1918–2011) was born there.

== Geography ==
The Solnan forms most of the commune's eastern border. The Sâne Morte forms part of the commune's southern border, flows northwestward through the commune, then forms most of its north-western border.

== Notable residents ==
- Waldeck Rochet (1905-1983) - Secretary General of the Communist Party of France (1964-1972)
- Rose Vincent (1918-2011) - Journalist and writer

== See also ==
- Communes of the Saône-et-Loire department
