= Michel Falempin =

French writer (born 1945)

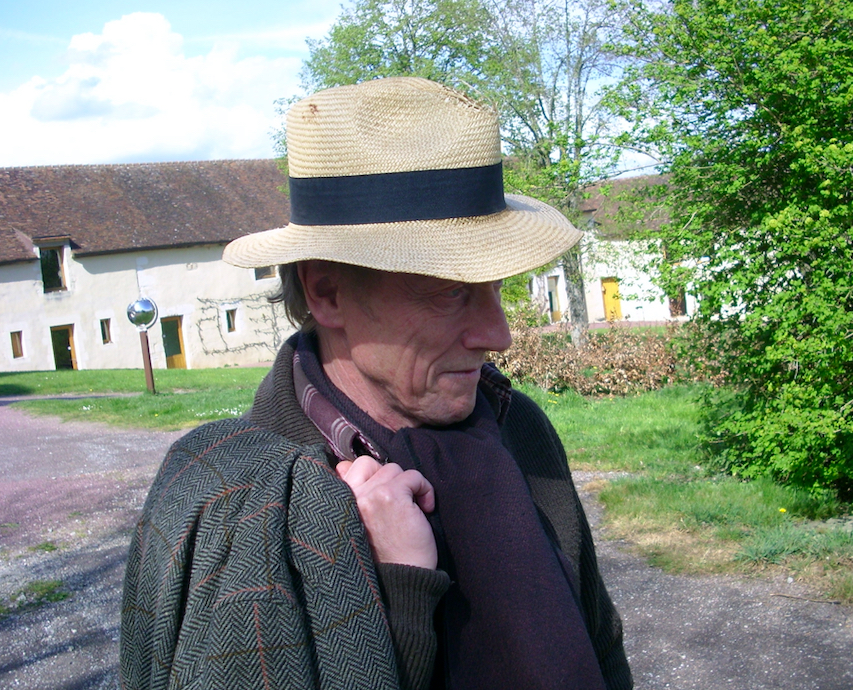
Michel Falempin 2012

Michel Falempin (born 1945, Paris) is a French writer.

An under librarian at the Bibliothèque nationale de France then a curator at the Bibliothèque publique d'information of the George Pompidou Center, he obtained the Prix Fénéon in 1976 for L'Écrit fait masse.

His work, written outside the literary genres, is influenced in particular by Stéphane Mallarmé, the literatures of the baroque age and the avant-gardes of which Michel Falempin comes from.

== Works ==
- 1976: L'Écrit fait masse, Paris, Flammarion, coll. Digraphe, (Prix Fénéon)
- 1987 La Légende travestie, Flammarion, series "Textes"
- 1989: L’ Œil occulte, Paris, Imprimerie nationale, series "Littérature"
- 1989: Stances de l'Érinnye, Nœux-les-Mines, Ecbolade
- 1991: Le Paradoxe du lotus, La souterraine, la Main Courante
- 1994: Gongora parmi les ombres, Barcelona, bilingual edition, Noésis, coll. Parvula
- 1995: L'Apparence de la vie, Paris, éditions Ivrea, ISBN 2-85184-242-0
- 1996: La Prescription, éditions Ivrea, ISBN 2-85184-254-4
- 1997: Ce que fiction veut dire, Lyon, Horlieu(x)
- 1999: Fiction lente, éditions Ivrea, ISBN 2-85184-272-2
- 2003: La tierce personne, Paris, L'Harmattan, series "Levée d'ancre"
- 2008: Exeat, Nœux-les-Mines, Ecbolade
- 2008: Faux airs, Publie.net (livre numérique)
- 2011: La vie littéraire, L'Harmattan, series "Levée d'ancre"
- 2012: L'irréel du passé, Hazebrouck, Hapax
