= Love and the Frenchwoman =

1960 French anthology film

- Directed by: Henri Decoin; Jean Delannoy; Michel Boisrond; René Clair; Henri Verneuil; Christian-Jaque; Jean-Paul Le Chanois
- Written by: Félicien Marceau; Louise de Vilmorin; Annette Wademant; René Clair; France Roche; Charles Spaak; Jean-Paul Le Chanois; Michel Audiard
- Starring: Jean-Paul Belmondo; Dany Robin
- Cinematography: Robert Lefebvre
- Music by: Georges Delerue
- Distributed by: Unidex
- Release date: 1960
- Language: French
- Box office: $22.9 million

Love and the Frenchwoman (French: La française et l'amour) is a 1960 French anthology film.

The movie was a big hit in France with admissions of 3,056,736.

== Cast ==
=== 1 - L'Enfance ===
- Pierre-Jean Vaillard : Monsieur Eugène Bazouche
- Jacqueline Porel : Madame Bazouche
- Darry Cowl : le professeur Dufieux
- Noël Roquevert : Colonel Chappe
- Jacques Duby : Victor
- Paulette Dubost : Madame Tronche
- Micheline Dax : Mademoiselle Lulu

=== 2 - L'Adolescence ===
- Sophie Desmarets : Lucienne Martin, la mère
- Pierre Mondy : Édouard Martin, le père
- Annie Sinigalia : Bichette Martin, la fille
- Roger Pierre : le prince charmant
- François Nocher : Jacques
- Pierre-Louis : le médecin
- Simone Paris : la dame à la soirée
- Jean Desailly : la voix du speaker

=== 3 - La Virginité ===
- Valérie Lagrange : Ginette
- Pierre Michael : François
- Nicole Chollet : la mère de Ginette
- Marie-Thérèse Orain : une coiffeuse
- Joëlle Latour : une coiffeuse
- Charles Bouillaud : l'hôtelier
- Pascal Mazzotti : le coiffeur
- Paul Bonifas : le père de Ginette

=== 4 - Le Mariage ===
- Claude Rich : Charles, le marié
- Marie-José Nat : Line, la mariée
- Yves Robert : le moustachu
- Jacques Fabbri : le porteur SNCF
- Jacques Marin : le contrôleur SNCF

=== 5 - L'Adultère ===
- Dany Robin : Nicole
- Paul Meurisse : Jean-Claude
- Jean-Paul Belmondo : Gilles
- Claude Piéplu : Monsieur Berton-Marsac, l'homme d'affaires
- Bernard Musson : le serveur
- Kessler Twins : maîtresses de Jean-Claude

=== 6 - Le Divorce ===
- François Périer : Michel
- Annie Girardot : Danielle
- Denise Grey : la mère de Danielle
- Jean Poiret : un avocat
- Michel Serrault : un avocat
- Francis Blanche : le juge Marceroux
- Alfred Adam : l'ami de Michel
- Georges Chamarat : le juge

=== 7 - La Femme seule ===
Based on a short story by Marcel Aymé

- Robert Lamoureux : Désiré
- Martine Carol : Éliane
- Silvia Monfort : Gilberte
- Simone Renant : l'avocate
- Robert Rollis : le joueur de ping-pong
- Suzanne Nivette : Mademoiselle Mangebois
- Paul Villé : le président du tribunal
