= Paul Pagk =

English painter

Paul Pagk is an abstract painter born in England, UK in 1962. He moved to France in 1973. He lives and works in New York City since 1988.

== Biography ==
Pagk was born in 1962 of a Czech father and an English mother, who was also a painter and with whom he visited museums as a child.

He studied at the École nationale supérieure des Beaux-Arts in Paris (France) from 1978 until 1982, year in which he founded the « 55 rue des Panoyaux » space in Ménilmontant (Paris) - a working space for artists located in an old foundry. One year later he met the French gallerist Jean Fournier who became one of his first collectors.

In 1984, he exhibited at the galerie Jean Fournier in Paris and at the Musée des Arts Décoratifs. In 1987, he had his first solo-show at the galerie Jean Fournier, and exhibited also at the art center Crédac in Ivry (France) and at the Parc Floral of Paris. That same year, he was awarded the Prix Fénéon (Sorbonne University, Paris). In September 1988, he moved to New York where he had found an artist loft to rent, and what was supposed to be a one-year stay became a long-term one in New York. That year, he discovered the triple exhibition of Blinky Palermo, Imi Knoebel, and Joseph Beuys at the Dia Art Foundation in Chelsea (New York), which had an important impact on his work.

In 1990, he was included in the exhibition "Three Painters" curated by Tim Nye in Soho (New York), which included also American artist Jacqueline Humphries and Korean artist Huyn Soo Choi. In 1991, Tim Nye opened a non-profit space "Thread Waxing Space" in Soho with Paul Pagk's first solo show in New York. In 1993, the second solo show of Paul Pagk at Thread Waxing Space was accompanied by a catalogue with a discussion between Tim Nye and Paul Pagk.

Since then, his work is regularly exhibited in France, United States and Europe. Institutional surveys of his work were held at the Centre d’Arts Plastiques, Royan (2022), the Fondation Fernet-Branca, Saint-Louis (2021) and C.R.A.C. Montbéliard (1999) all in France. He had solo exhibitions at Miguel Abreu Gallery (2023), Galerie Eric Dupont, Paris (2019, 2016 & 2014), Baukunst Galerie, Cologne (2008), Markus Winter, Berlin (2007), CRG Gallery, New York (1995 & 1994), Thread Waxing Space, New York (1993 & 1991), Galerie Jean Fournier, Paris (1987), among others. Recently, his work was included in Singing in Unison: Artists Need to Create on the Same Scale That Society Has the Capacity to Destroy, Part 6 curated by Phong H. Bui at Miguel Abreu Gallery, New York (2022). Pagk's work is in the permanent collections of the Fonds National d’Art Contemporain (FNAC), Paris; Les Abattoirs, Toulouse; FRAC Picardie, France, Springfield Museum of Art, OH; Hood Museum of Art, Dartmouth College, NH, among others.

He received several awards: Prix Fénéon (1987), Pollock-Krasner Foundation Grant (1998), Sheldon Bergh Prize (2000), Adolph and Esther Gottlieb Foundation Grant (2012), Pollock-Krasner Foundation Grant (2012), Joan Mitchell Foundation Painters & Sculptors Grant (2014)., and NYSCA/NYFA Artist Fellowship in Painting (2018).

== Assessments ==
When reviewing Paul Pagk's show in 1993 (Artforum International), art critic Donald Kuspit said, "Paul Pagk's abstract paintings show that the renewal of painting depends upon the renewal of what is fundamental to it: primitive sensory experience articulated through texture and elementary structure. The former is innate to surface, the latter marks it as the universal ground of presentation."

For Franklin Sirmans, the density of paint in Pagk's work is reminiscent of "early Dutch painting." While also finding references in his paintings to a variety of 20th century abstract artists, Sirmans concludes "The artist's style is thoroughly unique avoiding any burdensome odes to modernist or postmodernist longing." (Note: "The pleasure principle" catalog essay published in 1999 for Pagk's show at art center Le10neuf du CRAC in Montbeliard)

According to Raphael Rubinstein, "Whatever illusions and sensations his canvases might produce, Pagk’s stated intent is for viewers to “inhabit” his paintings and the spatial constructs therein."

== Selection ==
- 2024 - Szpakowski in Continuity, Miguel Abreu Gallery, New York
- 2023 - Drawing Past and Present: Paul Pagk with Master Works from Durer to Matisse, Joe Project, Montréal, QC, Canada
- 2023 - Paul Pagk, Miguel Abreu Gallery, New York
- 2022 - Paul Pagk: Peintures et Dessins 2008–2021, Centre d’Arts Plastiques (C.A.P.) de Royan, France
- 2022 - Queen of Spades, Hionas Gallery, New York, NY
- 2022 - Pas de Deux: Paul Pagk, Thomas Park Gallery, Seoul, South Korea
- 2021 - Paul Pagk: Rythmes & Structures, Fondation Fernet-Branca, Saint-Louis, France
- 2019 - Paul Pagk:Interaction, Galerie Eric Dupont, Paris, France
- 2016 - Paul Pagk, Galerie Eric Dupont, Paris, France
- 2015 - ON PAPER Mamie Holst and Paul Pagk, presented by Jane Kim, 33 Orchard, New York City, US
- 2014 - Œuvres récentes, Galerie Eric Dupont, Paris, France
- 2014 - Material Way, curated by Kathleen Kucka, Shirley Fitterman Art Gallery BMCC, New York City, US
- 2014 - (S)ITATIONS La beauté devient avant-garde une passion privée, Musée de Sarrebourg, Sarrebourg, France
- 2014 - Summer Show, Focus on Painting, FL Gallery, Milan, Italie
- 2014 - Brooklyn Bridge, curated by Justine Frischmann, George Lawson Gallery, San Francisco, CA, US
- 2013 - 18 Drawings and 1 Painting, Studio 10, Brooklyn, New York, US
- 2013 - Come Together: Surviving Sandy, Year 1, curated by Phong Bui, Dedalus foundation, Brooklyn, US
- 2013 - La main invente le dessin, Centre culturel de rencontre, Abbaye de Saint-Riquier, France
- 2013 - Four Tet, JiM Contempori, Barcelone, Espagne
- 2013 - Emergence, A Proposition by: Katrin Bremermann, Erin Lawlor & Yifat Gat, Hôtel de Sauroy, Paris, France
- 2013 - Wit, curated by Joanne Freeman, Painting Center, New York, US
- 2012 - Around the corner, Four Painters Living in Tribeca: Hermine Ford, Joanne Greenbaum, Paul Pagk, Gary Stephan, organized by Lucien Terras, New York, US
- 2012 - Line and Plane, McKenzie Fine Art, New York City, US
- 2012 - Surface Affect, Miguel Abreu Gallery, New York City, US
- 2011 - Mesquite drawings, Some Walls, Oakland, CA, US
- 2011 - A Review, Edward Thorp Gallery, New York, US
- 2011 - 70 Years of Abstract Painting – Excerpts, Jason McCoy inc. New York, US
- 2011 - Paper A-Z, Sue Scott Gallery, New York, US
- 2011 - Geometric Days, curated by Papo Colo, Jeanette Ingberman, and Herb Tam, Exit Art, New York, US
- 2010 - Recent Paintings, My Red maybe your Orange, even, Galerie Eric Dupont, Paris, France
- 2010 - Painting and Sculpture, Foundation for Contemporary Art Benefit, Lehmann Maupin, New York, US
- 2010 - Informal Relations curated by Scott Grow, Indianapolis Museum of Contemporary Art, Indianapolis, US
- 2010 - Geometric Progressions, Edward Thorp Gallery, New York, US
- 2010 - Lush Life, curated by Franklin Evans and Omar Lopez-Chahoud, Scaramouche, New York, US
- 2009 - A fleur de peau II – Le dessin à l’épreuve, Galerie Eric Dupont, Paris, France
- 2008 - Present, curated by Jay Murphy, HP Garcia Gallery, New York, France
- 2008 - Group Show, Galerie Eric Dupont, Paris, France
- 2008 - Home is where the heart is, Baukunst Galerie, Cologne, Allemagne
- 2008 - Untitled (On Paper), Moti Hasson Gallery, New York, US
- 2007 - Inside the Pale, curated by Frank Schroder, Thrust Projects, New York, US
- 2007 - Orthodoxe/Hétérodoxe : choisir sa ligne, Le 10neuf, C.R.A.C. Monbéliard, France
- 2007 - To K from P with love, Markus Winter, Berlin, Allemagne
- 2007 - Aftermath & lexicon, Moti Hasson Gallery, New York, US
- 2007 - Beyond the Pale, curated by Candice Madey and Tairone Bastien, Moti Hasson Gallery, New York, US
- 2007 - Recent Paintings, Galerie Eric Dupont, Paris, France
- 2006 - Trait, ligne, écrire l’espace, F.R.A.C Beauvais, France
- 2006 - Twist it Twice, curated by Franklin Evans, Moti Hasson Gallery, New York, US
- 2006 - Hands up/Hand down, Miguel Abreu Gallery, New York, US
