= Michel Bernard (writer) =

French writer and official (born 1958)

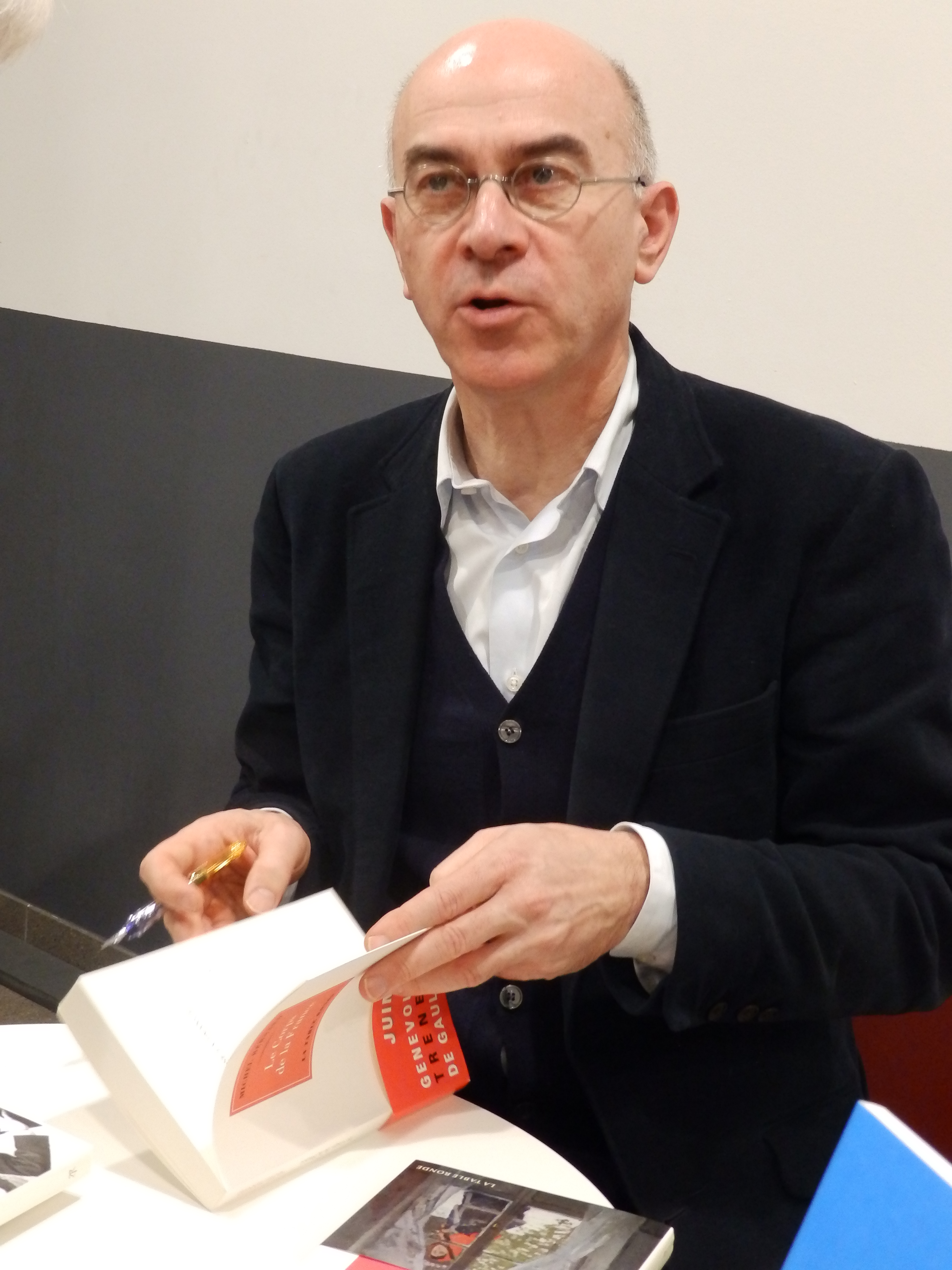
Michel Bernard en dédicace à Epinal, novembre 2016

Michel Bernard (born 14 December 1958, in Bar-le-Duc) is a French writer and senior official. A graduate from the École nationale d'administration (ENA) in 1992, he made a career in the prefectural corps.

== Works ==
- 1999: Mes tours de France. Éditions L'Âge d'Homme. 1999. ISBN 2-8251-1276-3.
- 2003: Comme un enfant. Le Temps qu'il fait. 2003. ISBN 2-86853-370-1.
- 2003: Jean-Marie Lecomte (2003). Le Ciel entre les feuilles. Éditions Noires terres. ISBN 2-915148-02-3.
- 2004: Jean-Marie Lecomte; Marc Paygnard (October 2014). La Meuse sentimentale. Éditions Noires terres. ISBN 978-2-915148-03-9.
- 2007: La Tranchée de Calonne. La Table ronde. 2007. ISBN 978-2-7103-2981-7. Prix Erckmann-Chatrian 2007
- 2009: La Maison du docteur Laheurte. La Table ronde. 2009. ISBN 978-2-7103-3077-6. Prix Maurice Genevoix 2009
- 2010: Le Corps de la France. La Table ronde. 2010. ISBN 978-2-7103-6553-2., Prix littéraire de l'armée de terre - Erwan Bergot 2010
- 2011: Pour Genevoix. La Table ronde. 2011. ISBN 978-2-7103-6879-3.
- 2014: La Grande Guerre vue du ciel. Éditions Perrin. 2013. ISBN 978-2-262-04071-0.
- 2015: Les Forêts de Ravel. La Table ronde. 2015. ISBN 978-2-7103-7607-1., Prix du festival Livres & Musiques de Deauville 2015
- 2016: Visages de Verdun. Perrin. 2016. ISBN 978-2-262-04813-6.
- 2016: Deux remords de Claude Monet. La Table ronde. 2016. ISBN 978-2-7103-8070-2.
- 2021: Bernard, Michel (2021). Les bourgeois de Calais (in French). Paris. ISBN 979-10-371-0615-5. OCLC 1266638846.

=== Prefaces ===
- 2008: Robert Porchon (2008). Carnet de route. La Table ronde. ISBN 978-2-7103-3083-7.
- 2011: Maurice Genevoix (2011). La Mort de près. La Table ronde. ISBN 978-2-7103-6882-3.
- 2013: Maurice Genevoix; Paul Dupuy (2013). Correspondance: 28 août 1914-30 avril 1915. La Table ronde. ISBN 978-2-7103-7055-0.
- 2013: Maurice Genevoix (2013). Ceux de 14. Flammarion. ISBN 978-2-08-130985-2.
- 2016: André Pézard (2016). Nous autres à Vauquois. La Table ronde. ISBN 978-2-7103-7966-9.
