= Strange Affair (1981 film) =

- Directed by: Pierre Granier-Deferre
- Written by: Christopher Frank; Pierre Granier-Deferre; Jean-Marc Roberts
- Produced by: Alain Sarde
- Starring: Michel Piccoli; Gérard Lanvin; Nathalie Baye
- Cinematography: Étienne Becker
- Edited by: Isabel García de Herreros
- Music by: Philippe Sarde
- Distributed by: Parafrance Films
- Release date: 23 December 1981
- Running time: 105 minutes
- Country: France
- Language: French

Strange Affair (French: Une étrange affaire) is a 1981 French drama film directed by Pierre Granier-Deferre, and starring Michel Piccoli, Gérard Lanvin and Nathalie Baye.

== Novel ==
The story was adapted from the novel of Jean-Marc Roberts Affaires étrangères, which won in 1979 the Prix Renaudot.

== Plot ==
Louis Coline (Gérard Lanvin) is an executive assistant in a declining Paris department store. While he is not ambitious and has little to do, he is content with his wife Nina (Nathalie Baye), visits to his mother and grandmother and nights out with his friends playing poker. However, the manipulative Bertrand Malair (Michel Piccoli) becomes the store's new manager, and arrives to shake up the company. Louis fears for his job, but Bertrand draws him into his inner circle of confidants. Bertrand starts to control Louis' life, while Louis is afraid of losing his privileged position. To maintain it Louis works overtime, accepts Bertrand's invitations to nightclubs and dinners with an androgynous woman, and places his house at Bertrand's disposal. Nina sees through her husband's behaviour and objects, but Louis cannot refuse Bertrand's demands, and she is unable to make him see how much his personality has changed. Desperate, she leaves her husband, which only draws him further under Bertrand's control. Bertrand soon disappears as mysteriously as he came, and Louis finds himself unable to revert to his previous self.

== Cast ==
- Michel Piccoli as Bertrand Malair
- Gérard Lanvin as Louis Coline
- Nathalie Baye as Nina Coline
- Jean-Pierre Kalfon as François Lingre
- Jean-François Balmer as Paul Belais
- Pierre Michael as Gérard Doutre
- Madeleine Cheminat as Yvette
- Jacques Boudet as M. Blain
- Victor Garrivier as Le père de Nina
- Dominique Blanchar as La mère de Louis
- Ariane Lartéguy as Salomé
- Nicolas Vogel as René
- Dominique Zardi as Gruault, chef des contentieux

== Awards ==
The film won the Louis Delluc Prize and the César Award for Best Actress in a Supporting Role, and it received César nominations for best actor, best supporting actor, best director and Best Screenplay, Dialogue or Adaptation. Michel Piccoli won the Silver Bear for Best Actor at the 32nd Berlin International Film Festival.
