= Château du Vigneau =

Castle and winery in France

- French: Château du Vigneau; Basque: Vigneau jauregia
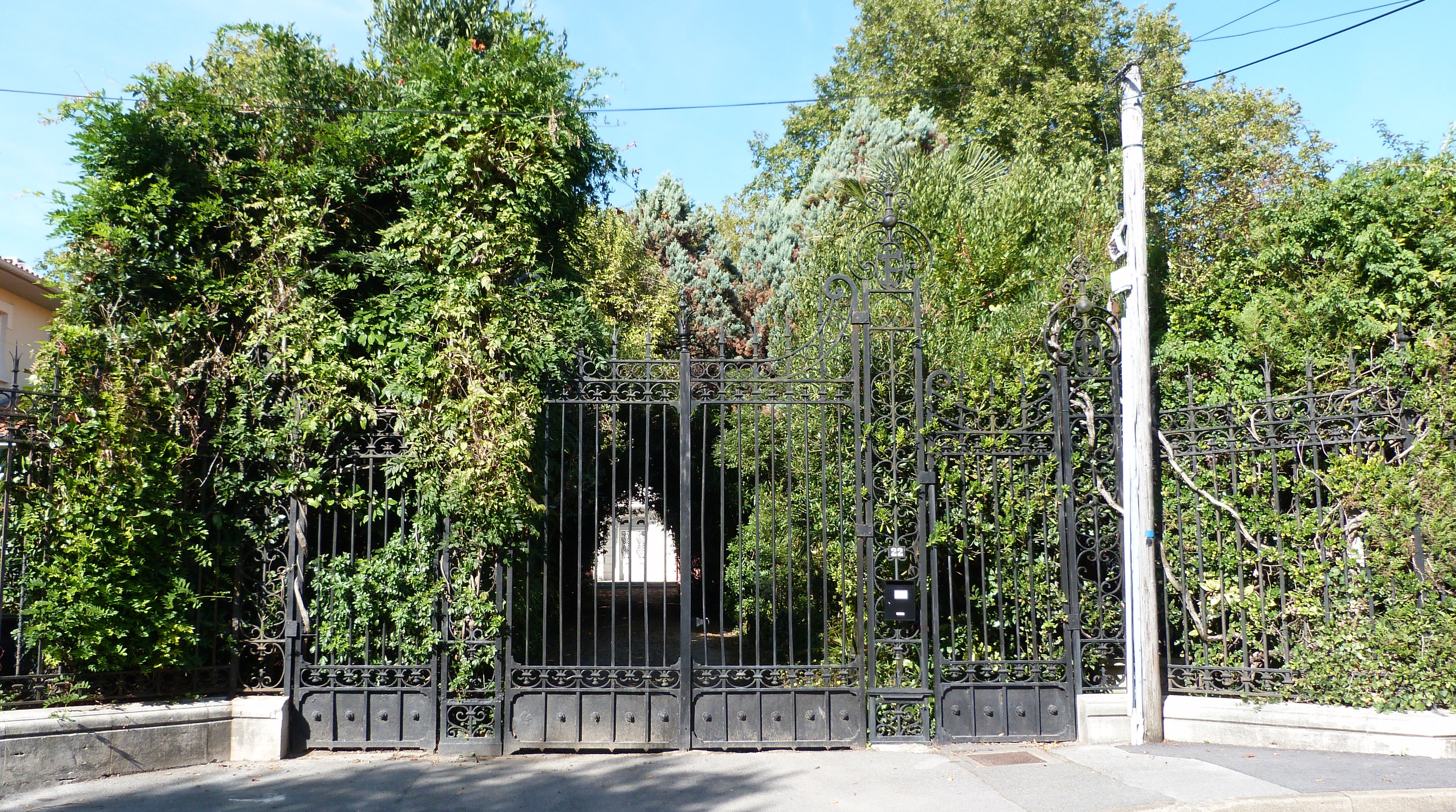
- The main façade (southern)
- Interactive map of Château du Vigneau
- Location: Bayonne, Pyrénées-Atlantiques, France
- Coordinates: 43°30′20″N 1°28′11″W
- Type: Castle, winery house, champagne house
- Beginning date: 19th century
- Restored date: 1848 transformed 1918

The Château du Vigneau (Occitan: Castèls del Vinhau; Basque: Vigneau jauregia) is a former winery transformed into a champagne house, located in Bayonne, Pyrénées-Atlantiques, France.

It has been officially registered as a Historical Monument since 2009, as well as its railings and entrance portal. It is one of the 22 Historical Monuments in Bayonne.

== History ==
After the violent battle of Bayonne in 1814, the winery house was restored in 1848, then transformed by architect Gomez in 1918.

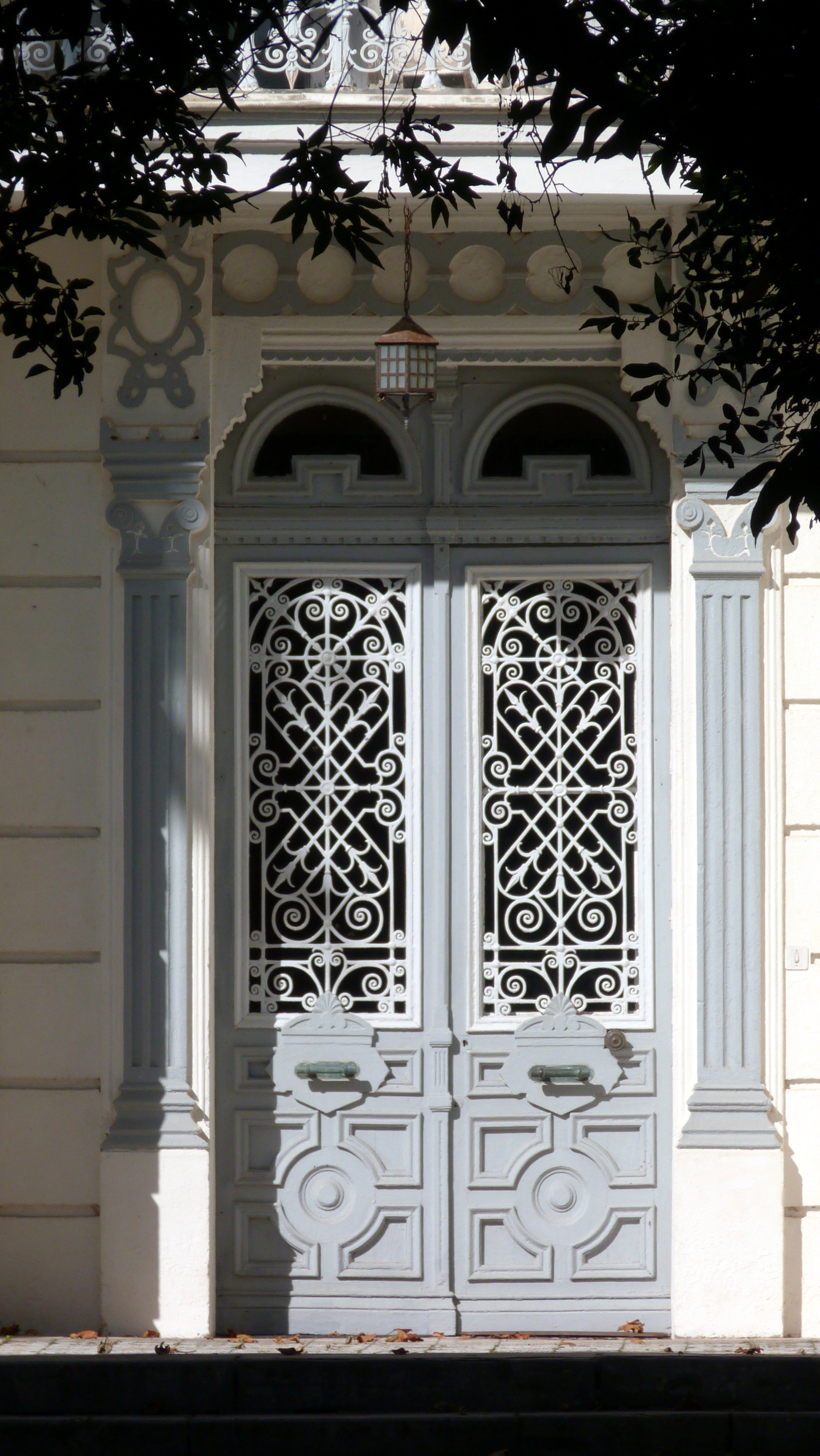
Main entry door on the southern façade

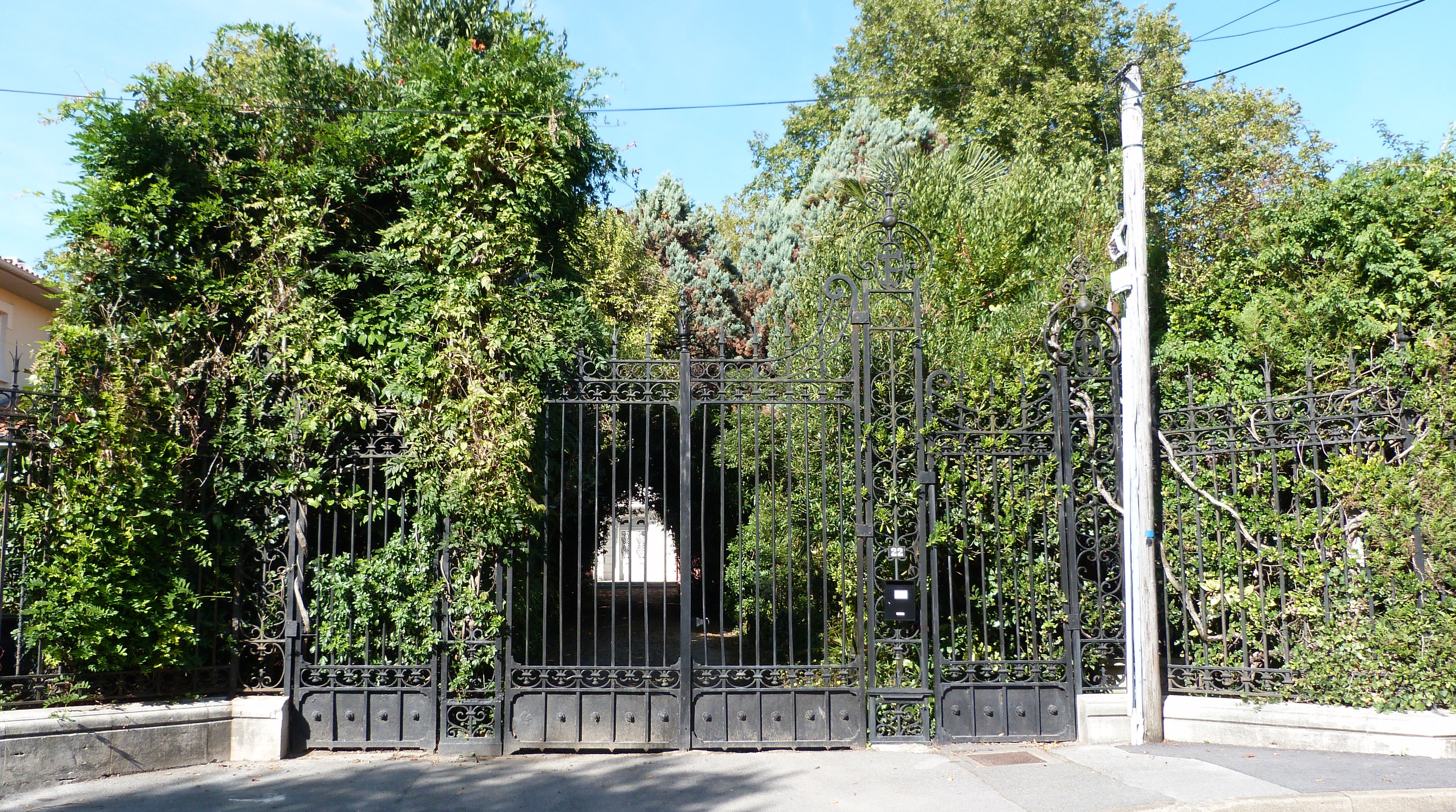
Railings and portal (Historical Monuments)

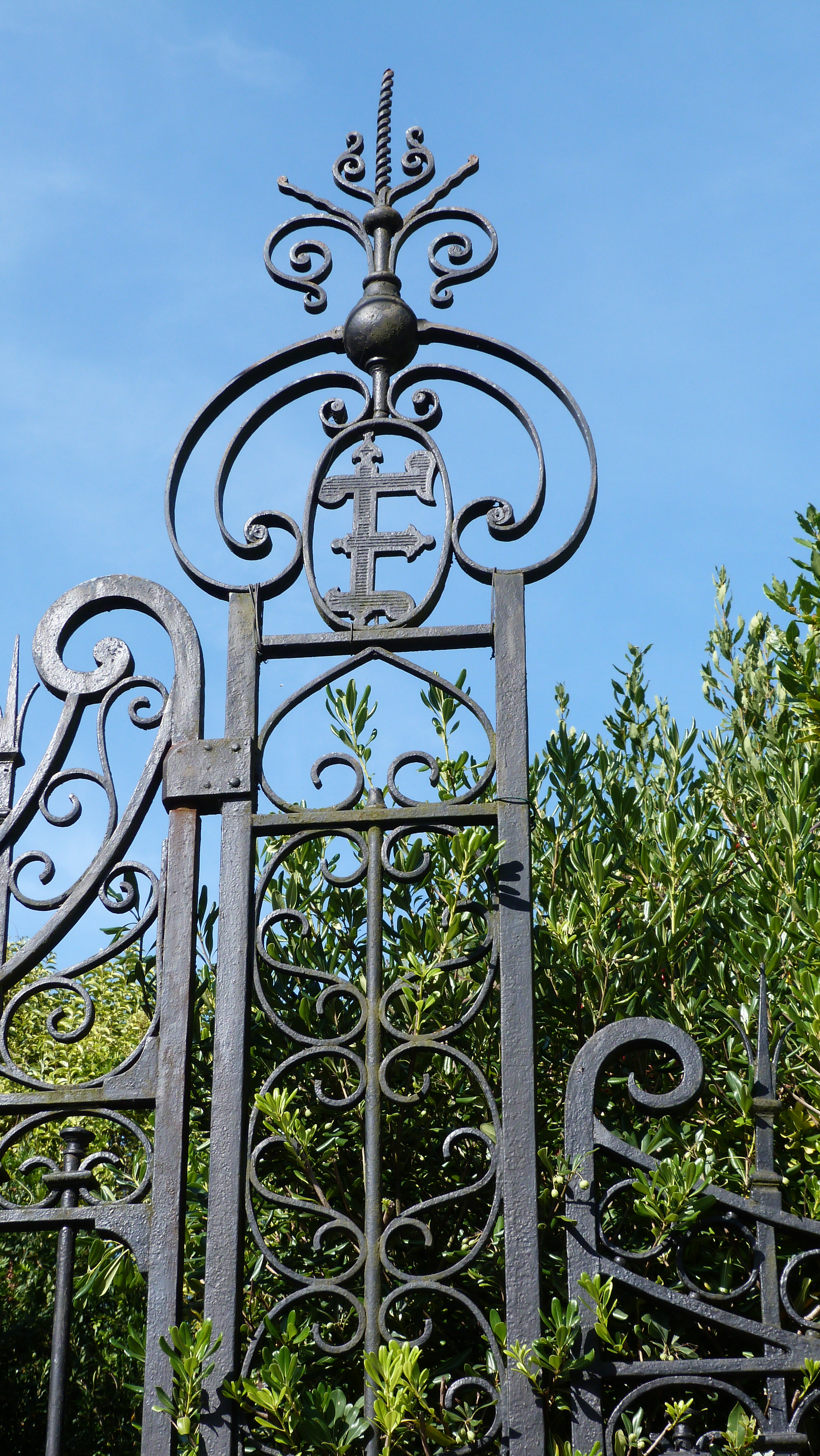
Detail of the railings (chemin de Laharie)
