= Bertrand Visage =

French academic and writer (born 1952)

- Born: 8 March 1952 (age 74); Chateaudrun, Eure et Loir, France
- Occupations: Academic and author
- Writing career
- Language: French
- Notable works: Au pays des nains Tous les soleils Angelica
- Notable awards: Fénéon Prize; Prix Femina; Albert Camus Prize

Bertrand Visage (French pronunciation: [bɛʁtʁɑ̃ vizaʒ]) is a French academic and writer.

He was a professor of literature in France for 3 years before moving to Italy to teach French literature for 2 years at the University of Catania in Sicily and afterwards at Naples Eastern University. Following a 2 years residence at the French Academy in Rome at the Villa Medici, he returned to Palermo, Sicily as a cultural attaché at the French Embassy. From 1987 to 1992 he taught French literature at the University of Rome and at the University of Naples.

His novels Tous les soleils and Angelica are both set in Sicily. Tous les soleils won the Prix Femina in 1984 and Angelica the Albert Camus Prize in 1988.

In 1983 he won the Fénéon Prize for his earlier novel Au pays des nains.
