= Paul Kline (photographer) =

American photographer (born 1964)

Paul Kline (born 1964) is an American photographer known for his editorial, advertising and documentary work.

== Biography ==
Kline was born in Long Beach, California. He graduated in 1991 from Cornell University with a Bachelor's degree and later he studied at the New York Institute of Photography. He moved to Washington DC. where he met his wife Mercedes. Kline's father Abbott was also a professional photographer, he gave his son his first camera. Kline has done commercial work for many corporations and ad agencies. His images have appeared in many publications, both new and old media.

Kline also produced photo documentaries such as The Silent Children Project which portrays at-risk children from around the world.

== Awards ==
- PX3 Competition, Prix de la Photographie, Honorable Mention, Paris 2008
- Olympus & PDN's VisionAge Contest, Honorable Mention, April 2008
- Popular Photography Magazine Photographer of the Year -Finalist, July 2006
- Smithsonian Magazine Photo Contest. April 2005
- American Photo Magazine, Annual Photo Contest, Fall 2002
