= L'Échelle =

- Commune
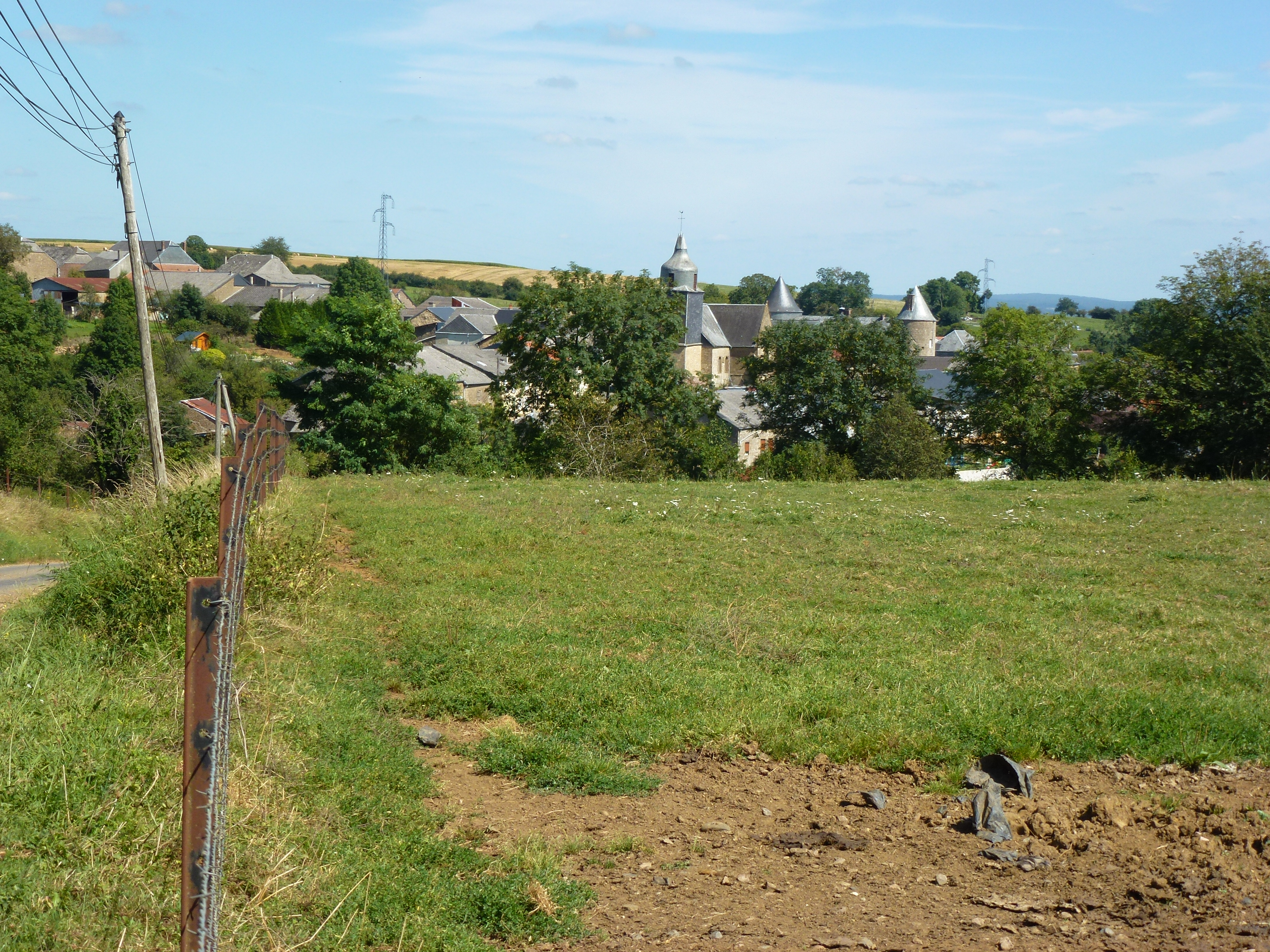
- A general view of L'Échelle

- Coat of arms
- Location of L'Échelle
- Location within France Location within Grand Est
- Coordinates: 49°48′03″N 4°28′28″E
- Country: France
- Region: Grand Est
- Department: Ardennes
- Arrondissement: Charleville-Mézières
- Canton: Signy-l'Abbaye
- Intercommunality: Ardennes Thiérache

Government
  - Mayor (2020–2026): Daniel Rhul
- Area^{1}: 9.96 km^{2} (3.85 sq mi)
- Elevation: 250 m (820 ft)
- Highest elevation: 299 m (981 ft)
- Lowest elevation: 174 m (571 ft)
- Population (2023): 129
  - Density: 13.0/km^{2} (33.5/sq mi)
- Time zone: UTC+01:00 (CET)
  - Summer (DST): UTC+02:00 (CEST)
- INSEE/Postal code: 08149 /08150
- ^{1} French Land Register data, which excludes lakes, ponds, glaciers > 1 km^{2} (0.386 sq mi or 247 acres) and river estuaries.

L'Échelle (French pronunciation: [leʃɛl]) is a commune in the Ardennes department and Grand Est region of north-eastern France.

== Population ==
Historical population
Year	Pop.	±% p.a.
1968	204	—
1975	193	−0.79%
1982	198	+0.37%
1990	184	−0.91%
1999	146	−2.54%
2007	136	−0.88%
2012	129	−1.05%
2017	137	+1.21%
2023	129	−1.00%
Source: INSEE

== See also ==
- Communes of the Ardennes department
