= Jacques Serguine =

French writer and essayist

- Born: Jacques Jean Marie Gouzerh; 9 June 1934; Neuilly-sur-Seine, France
- Died: 10 April 2023 (aged 88); Nemours, France
- Occupations: writer and essayist

Jacques Jean Marie Gouzerh (9 June 1934 – 10 April 2023), known professionally as Jacques Serguine, was a French writer and essayist.

== Biography ==
Born in 1934, Jacques Serguine, pen name of Jacques Gouzerh, lived and worked in Avon near Fontainebleau. He was noticed very young by Jean Paulhan who published his first texts in La Nouvelle Revue française. In 1959, his first novel, Les Fils de Rois, inaugurated the series "Le Chemin" (Gallimard) directed by Georges Lambrichs, obtained the Prix Fénéon and missed the Prix Médicis by one vote behind Claude Mauriac. Assimilated to the literary movement of the Hussards, he will decline the invitation by political convictions. His fourth novel Mano l'Archange, although unanimously hailed by the critic whose first defender was Kleber Haedens, was banned from sale for "harm to good morals".

On the sidelines of a noted literary work, Jacques Serguine is also the author of Cruelle Zélande and Éloge de la fessée (Folio Gallimard) which has been said to have given their letters of nobility to this erotic fantasy.

== Novels ==
- 1959: Les Fils de rois, Éditions Gallimard
- 1960: Le Petit Hussard, Gallimard
- 1962: Les Saints innocents, Gallimard, Prix Fénéon
- 1962: Mano l'Archange, Gallimard
- 1963: Les Falaises d'or, Gallimard
- 1964: Manuel et Gentille, Gallimard
- 1967: Les Jours, Flammarion
- 1969: Les Barbares, Gallimard
- 1970: La Mort confuse, Gallimard
- 1971: Les abois, Gallimard
- 1975: Les Russes et les Bretons, Gallimard
- 1978: Cruelle Zélande, Jean-Jacques Pauvert
- 1985: Je suis de la nation du loup, Éditions Balland
- 1989: Je n'ai pas fini de t'aimer aujourd'hui, Éditions Belfond
- 1992: La Maison de l'Avenida, Belfond
- 1992: La Culotte de feuilles, JC Lattès
- 1994: Istambul Loti, Lattès
- 1998: Délit du corps, Le Cercle
- 2003: La Peau du chagrin, Éditions du Rocher
- 2006: L'Été des jeunes filles, Mercure de France
- 2007: L'Attendrisseur, Blanche

== Essays ==
- 1973: Éloge de la fessée, Gallimard
- 1988: Contradictionnaire, Le Cherche midi
- 1989: L'Odeur de sainteté, Éditions Le Pré aux clercs
- 2002: Un stylo à bile, Le Cherche midi
- 2004: De la coupe aux lèvres, followed by Écrire l'Eros, interviews with Stéphan Lévy-Kuentz, Blanche

== Notices ==
- 2000: Encyclopédie du Sadomasochisme (p. 350.351). La Musardine
- 2005: Dictionnaire de la pornographie (p. 562). Dir. Philippe Di Folco, P.U.F

== Extract ==
"If writing is the sine qua non medium of the writer, the man of letters has a career, I am a writer, I have always been, good or bad, it belongs to others to decide. I write because I have no other way to speak. I do not like the attendance of other writers on the whole. My friends say that I am an uncouth bear, an animal which, with time, has become my totem, so I always lived on the fringe of the literary milieu". Écrire l'Éros, interviews with Stéphan Lévy-Kuentz, Blanche 2004)
