= Dominique Daguet =

French writer, poet and journalist (1938–2021)

Dominique Daguet (22 September 1938 – 1 November 2021) was a French writer, poet and journalist. He was the creator and animator of the literary magazine Les Cahiers bleus published in Troyes (from 1975).

He won the prix Fénéon in 1960 for his book Soleil et Lune. From 1960 onwards, he published some fifty books and developed a strong interest in the Shroud of Turin.

Daguet died on 1 November 2021, at the age of 83.

== Biography ==
Dominique Daguet is the founder and editor of the journal Les Cahiers bleus, published in Troyes (the journal was founded in 1975).

He won the Prix Fénéon in 1960 for his book Soleil et Lune. Since 1960, he has published some fifty books.

He served as Jean Paulhan secretary and taught drama and poetic diction at the Troyes Conservatory.
