= Jean-Luc Déjean =

French professor of classical literature, a producer of television programs and writer

Jean-Luc Déjean (10 May 1921, Montpellier – 12 September 2006) was a French professor of classical literature, a producer of television programs (documentaries and youth programs) and writer.

== Works ==
Novels

- Le premier chien
- Le Maître des chiens
- Les chevaux du roi
- Les lions de César
- Les Voleurs de pauvres (Prix Fénéon 1954)
- Bella des garrigues
- Mémoires d'un menteur
- Honneur aux assassins
- Les loup de la croisade
- Le cousin de Porthos
- Les Dames de Byzance
- L'Impératrice de Byzance
- Les légions de Byzance
- Le Pic et la Poudre

Biographies

- Clément Marot
- Marguerite de Navarre
- Les comtes de Toulouse (1050–1250)

Essais

- Le théâtre français d'aujourd'hui (1945–1974)
- Le théâtre français d'aujourd'hui (1945–1985)

Poetry

- La Feuille à l'envers
