= Pauline Klein =

French writer

Pauline Klein (born 3 September 1976) is a French writer.

After studying philosophy at the Sorbonne, then aesthetics at Nanterre University, she eventually entered Saint Martin's School of Art in London. She worked four years in an art gallery of New York. Alice Kahn, her first novel published in 2010, was awarded the Prix Fénéon, while her second novel, Fermer l'œil de la nuit, was published in 2012.

== Bibliography ==
- 2010: Alice Kahn, novel, éditions Allia.
- 2012: Fermer l'œil de la nuit, novel, éditions Allia.
