= Robert Vigneau =

French expressionist poet (1933–2022)

Robert Jean Pierre Vigneau (26 August 1933 – 18 August 2022) was a French expressionist poet. He published nine collections of poems, in major publishing houses (Gallimard, Seghers ...). His most famous poems are those he wrote for the youth (The Whale... two of his books were recommended by the Éducation nationale française).

Vigneau was also a draftsman: he published two books of drawings, and exhibited periodically, in Japan and France.

The poem Jehan l'Advenu by Norge, known for being sung by Georges Brassens, is dedicated to "Robert et Marie-Hélène Vigneau" in the Œuvres poétiques 1923-1973 by Norge, Séghers, 1978, p. 611.

Born in Nice on 26 August 1933, he died in Cannes on 18 August 2022, at the age of 88.

== Works ==
Poetry

- 1953: L'Ange et l'accordéon, Éditions Seghers
- 1963: Il, Guy Chambelland
- 1972: Naigreries, Ravindra Press
- 1975: Cartes indiennes, La Main d'Hélène
- 1979: Articles sur catalogues, Prouvaires
- 1979: Bucolique followed by Élégiaque, Éditions Gallimard
- 2000: Bestiaire à Marie, Nathan, 1985, éditions éoliennes
- 1997: Botaniques, éditions éoliennes
- 2005: Planches d'anatomie, Adana Venci & éditions éoliennes
- 2009: Une vendange d'innocents, Maison de la Poésie

Texts and drawings

- 1995: La Guerre de cinquante ans, À hélice

Drawings

- 1978: Œufs, Adana Venci
- 2001: Entrée des créatures, Adana Venci
- 2014: Éros au potager, Adana Venci
