= Jean-Marc Roberts =

Jean-Marc Roberts (3 May 1954 – 25 March 2013) was a French editor, novelist, and screenwriter.

== Life ==
He started writing in the early 1970s. He was awarded the 1973 Fénéon Prize for Samedi, dimanche et fêtes (English: Saturday, Sunday and holidays), and, in 1979, the Prix Renaudot for his novel Affaires étrangères (English: Foreign Affairs). He was an editor for Seuil, the Mercure de France and Fayard and a director of Editions Stock.

He died of cancer on 25 March 2013.

== Bibliography ==
- Samedi, dimanche et fêtes, Le Seuil, 1972. (Prix Fénéon, 1973)
- Baudelaire et les voleurs, Julliard, 1973.
- Le Sommeil agité, Le Seuil, 1977.
- Les Enfants de fortune, Le Seuil, 1978.
- Affaires étrangères, Le Seuil, 1979. (Prix Renaudot, 1979)
- L'Ami de Vincent, Le Seuil, 1982.
- Portrait craché, Le Seuil, 1983.
- Méchant, Le Seuil, 1985.
- Mon père américain, Le Seuil, 1988.
- L'Angoisse du tigre, Le Seuil, 1990.
- Les Seins de Blanche Neige, Grasset, 1993.
- Affaires personnelles, Grasset, 1996.
- Monsieur Pinocchio, Julliard, 1998.
- Un début d'explication, Le Seuil, 2000.
- Une petite femme, Grasset, 2000.
- Toilette de chat, Le Seuil, 2003.
- Les Bêtes curieuses, réédition, Balland, 2003.
- Je te laisse, Le Seuil, 2004.
- Cinquante ans passés, Grasset, 2006. ISBN 978-2-246-71101-8
- La Prière, Flammarion, 2008. ISBN 978-2-08-120752-3
- François-Marie, Gallimard, 2011. ISBN 978-2-07-013420-5

=== Screenplays ===
- Une étrange affaire de Pierre Granier-Deferre, 1981, after his Affaires étranges.
- Que les gros salaires lèvent le doigt! by Denys Granier-Deferre, 1982, after his Les Bêtes curieuses.
- L'Ami de Vincent by Pierre Granier-Deferre, 1983, after his novel.
- Cours privé by Pierre Granier-Deferre, 1986.
- Elles n'oublient jamais (Love in the Strangest Way) by Christopher Frank, 1993.
- Faux et usage de faux
- La Couleur du vent
- les gros salaires levent le doigt!!!
