= Mon village à l'heure allemande =

1945 novel by Jean-Louis Bory

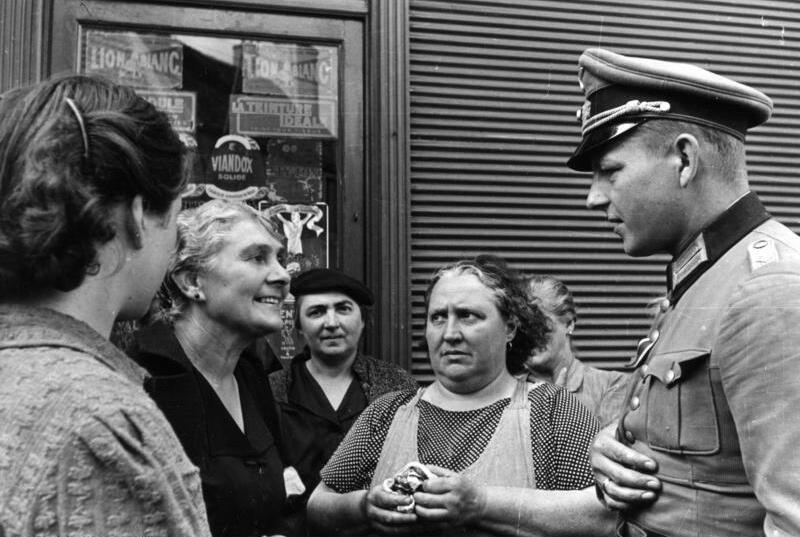
- Bundesarchiv Bild 101I-056-1618-04, Frankreich, deutsche Besatzung
- Author: Jean-Louis Bory
- Genre: Novel
- Publisher: Flammarion
- Publication date: 1945
- Publication place: France
- Pages: 307

Mon village à l'heure allemande is a novel by Jean-Louis Bory published in 1945, which won the Prix Goncourt the same year.

== Editions ==
- Mon village à l'heure allemande , Groupe Flammarion, Paris, 1945.

Preceded by Le premier accroc coûte 200 francs by Elsa Triolet	Prix Goncourt; 1945	Succeeded by Histoire d'un fait divers by Jean-Jacques Gautier
