= Léon Uhl =

French poet, playwright and opera librettist

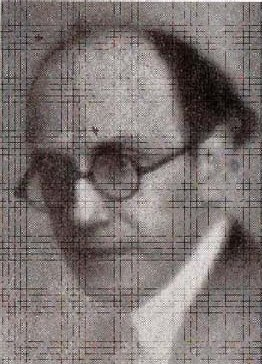
- Born: 19 May 1889; Paris, France
- Died: Unknown; Unknown
- Occupations: Poet; Playwright; Librettist

Léon Uhl (19 May 1889 in Paris – ? ) was a 20th-century French poet, playwright and opera librettist.

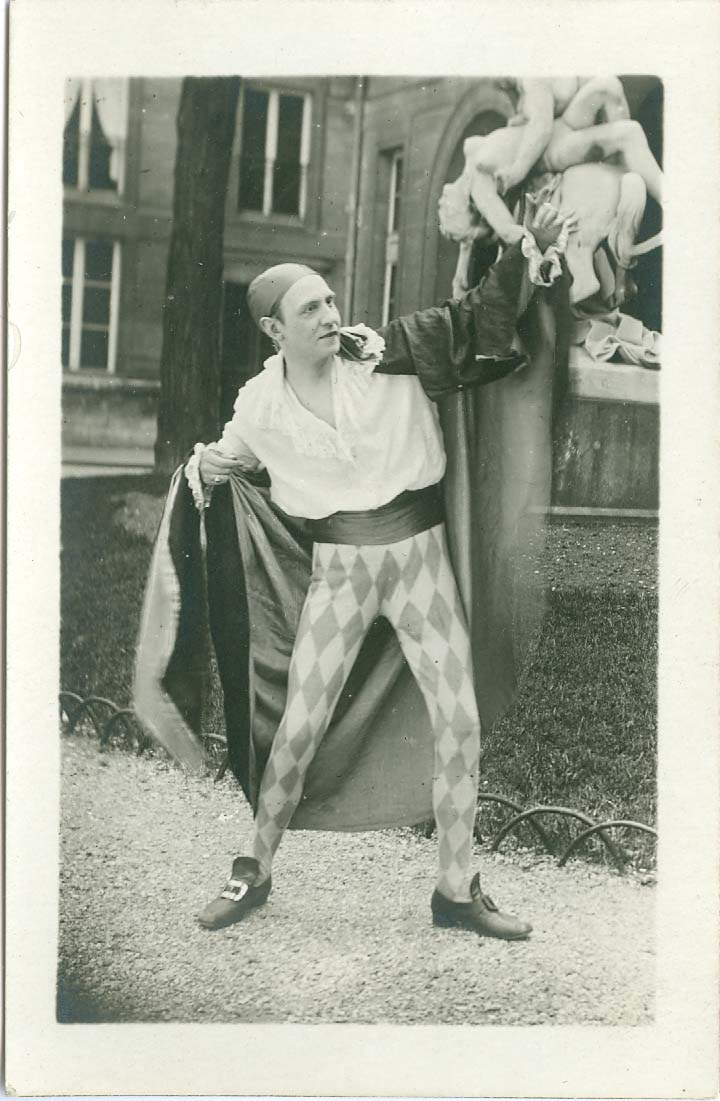
Léon Uhl: Postcard of the poet as Harlequin

== Works ==
=== Operettas ===
- 1926: La Dernière valse, 5 May, three-act operetta, French adaptation of Der letzte Walzer on a music by Oscar Straus.
- 1927: La Teresina, 4 May
- 1928: La Rose de Stamboul, 26 January
- 1929: Une seule nuit, 9 March
- 1930: La Belle inconnue, 1 January
- 1932: Mariage à Hollywood, 2 March, operetta in 4 tableaux, French adaptation of Hochzeit in Hollywood on a music by Oscar Straus.
- 1935: Lady Poum, 23 February, French adaptation of Die Erte Beste
- Dante, in collaboration with Jean Sardou at the Grand Théâtre de Bordeaux.
- Jeanne de France, mystère lyrique in 4 acts and 8 tableaux, poem by Léon Uhl, music by Jean Nouguès (operas composer born in Bordeaux in 1875), Orléans, 5–8 May 1929, Gaîté Lyrique, 10 May 1931

==== Editions ====
- 1950: La Dernière Valse, three-act operetta, libretto by Léon Uhl and Jean Marietti, music by Oscar Straus, M. Eschig
- 1937: La Prière sur le tombeau, preface by Léon Frapié, Chanth
- 1927: Un théâtre national en France. Paul Fort et les chroniques de France, Mercure de France, 15 September
- 1927: La Teresina, three-act operetta, music by Oscar Straus, M. Eschig

=== Theatre ===
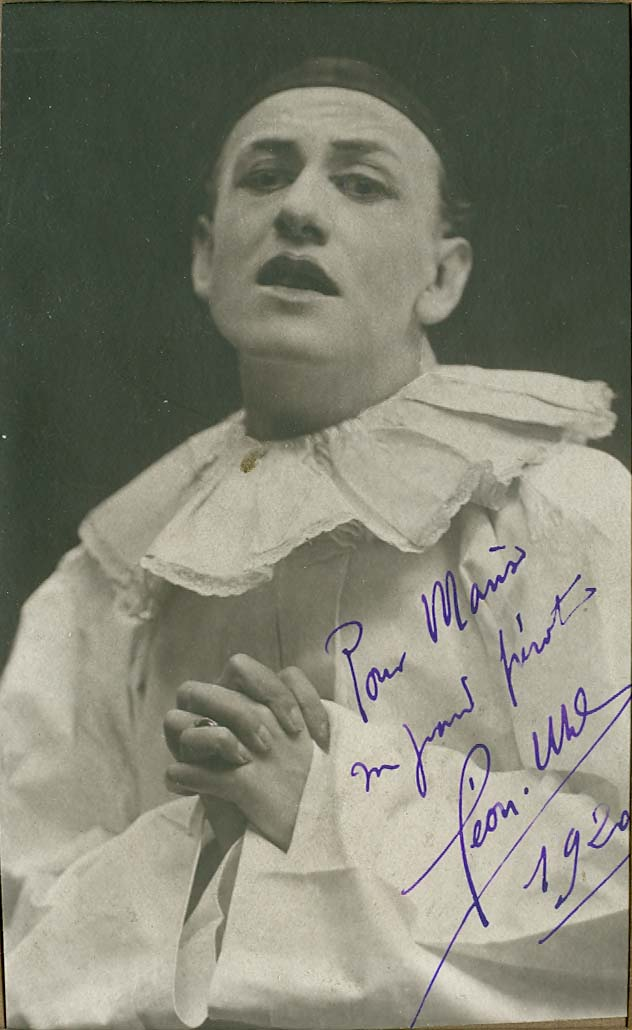
Léon Uhl: Autographed photo of the poet to his sister

- Alceste au désert
- Le Mouchoir
- La Miniature
- Amoureuses
- L'Œillet rouge
- Le Sommeil de Racine, one-act play in verse, Revue française, 8 February 1925; Paris, Odéon, 22 December 1924
- La Parade de Tabarin
- Le Nid dans l'orage
- La Première Nuit de Don Juan
- Arlequin, rival de Don Juan, one-act play, Théâtre Athéna, 22 April 1931

=== Poetry ===
- 1927: Odyl, with a présentation by Paul Fort, Eugène Figuière

== Sources ==
- Alphonse Marius Gossez, Les Poètes du XXe, Eugène Figuière, 1929, p. 253
