= Ivana Hadži-Popović =

Serbian writer and translator

Ivana Hadži-Popović (Serbian-Cyrillic: Ивана Хаџи-Поповић, born in Belgrade, Yugoslavia) is a Serbian writer and translator.

== Biography ==
Ivana Hadži-Popović studied at the Department of Romance Studies of Belgrade's Faculty of Philology and graduated with magister degree. She works as literary editor and translator at the Albatros publishing house in Belgrade.

Among her numerous translations are works of French and Italian writers such as Catherine Clément, Sidonie-Gabrielle Colette, Catherine Cusset, Anaïs Nin, Marguerite Yourcenar, Pierre Assouline, Dino Buzzati, Benoît Duteurtre, Pierre Michon, Henry de Montherlant, Antonio Tabucchi, Michel Tournier and Maryam Madjidi. The long-term translation and editorial activity is a noteworthy contribution to the Franco-Serbian cultural exchange.

Hadži-Popović's translation of the French-language memories, aphorisms and letters of Queen Natalie is a particularly interesting publication on the cultural and political history of Serbia. The author of numerous novels and essay collections, she is member of the International Francophone Press Union. She lives in Vračar.

== Awards ==
- Isidora Sekulić Award

== Bibliography (selection) ==
- Sezona trešanja (Cherry Season), KOV, Vršac 1998, novel.
- Knez (Knez), KOV, Vršac 1999, novel.
- Brod za Buenos Ajres (A Ship to Buenos Aires), Jugoslovenska knjiga, Belgrade 2001, novel, ISBN 86-7411-046-0
- Zamka (The Trap), Filip Višnjić Publishing, Belgrade 2004, novel, ISBN 86-7363-412-1.
- Na Hadrijanovom tragu (On Hadrian's Trace), Filip Višnjić Publishing, Belgrade 2008, novel, ISBN 978-86-7363-567-5
- Japanska kutija (The Japanese Box), Palabra, Belgrade 2010, novel, ISBN 978-86-88091-01-5.
- Žena s buketom (A Woman with Bouquet), Medijska knjižara Krug, Belgrade 2012, novel, ISBN 978-86-83523-44-3.
- Vatra i cvet (Fire and Flower), Medijska knjižara Krug, Belgrade 2014, novel, ISBN 978-86-83523-52-8.
- Ljubičice Leonarda da Vinčija (Leonardo da Vinci’s Violas), Albatros plus, Belgrade 2017, novel, ISBN 978-86-6081-244-7.
- Senka doktora Junga (Doctor Jung's Shadow), Albatros plus, Belgrade 2020, novel, ISBN 978-86-6081-326-0.
- Košmar oko Ničea (Nightmare around Nietzsche), Albatros plus, Belgrade 2021, novel, ISBN 978-86-6081-344-4.
