= Amette =

Amette is a surname. Notable people with the surname include:

- Jacques-Pierre Amette (born 1943), French writer
- Léon-Adolphe Amette (1850–1920), French Catholic cardinal
