= Brecht's Mistress =

2003 novel by Jacques-Pierre Amette

- Original French language edition La Maîtresse de Brecht (2003)
- Author: Jacques-Pierre Amette
- Original title: La Maîtresse de Brecht
- Language: French
- Publisher: Éditions Albin Michel
- Publication date: 20 August 2003
- Publication place: France
- Pages: 306
- ISBN: 2-226-14163-4

Brecht's Mistress (French: La Maîtresse de Brecht) is a 2003 novel by the French writer Jacques-Pierre Amette. It is also known as Brecht's Lover. It received the Prix Goncourt.

== Plot ==
In 1948, the German playwright Bertolt Brecht leaves New York to return to Berlin. There he meets a young woman, Maria, with whom he falls in love, but who turns out to be a spy in the service of the Stasi, the East German secret services.

== See also ==
- 2003 in literature
- Contemporary French literature
