= Thibaut d'Anthonay =

French writer

Thibaut d'Anthonay (born 1962) is a French writer. Specializing in 19th Century French Literature, in 2005 he won the Goncourt Prize for a biography of Jean Lorrain. He has also written historical novels, such as Le baron de Beausoleil.
