= Claude Pichois =

French academic (1925–2004)

Claude Pichois was a French academic and a leading scholar on the life and work of Charles Baudelaire. He was born in Paris and studied at the Ecole des Hautes Etudes Commerciales and at Sorbonne University. He taught at Vanderbilt University for many years.

He published extensively on Baudelaire and collaborated with scholars such as Jacques Crepet and Jean Ziegler. He also wrote on classic French authors such as Gerard Nerval and Colette. His life of Colette (co-written with Alain Brunet) won a Prix Goncourt.
