= Henri Deberly =

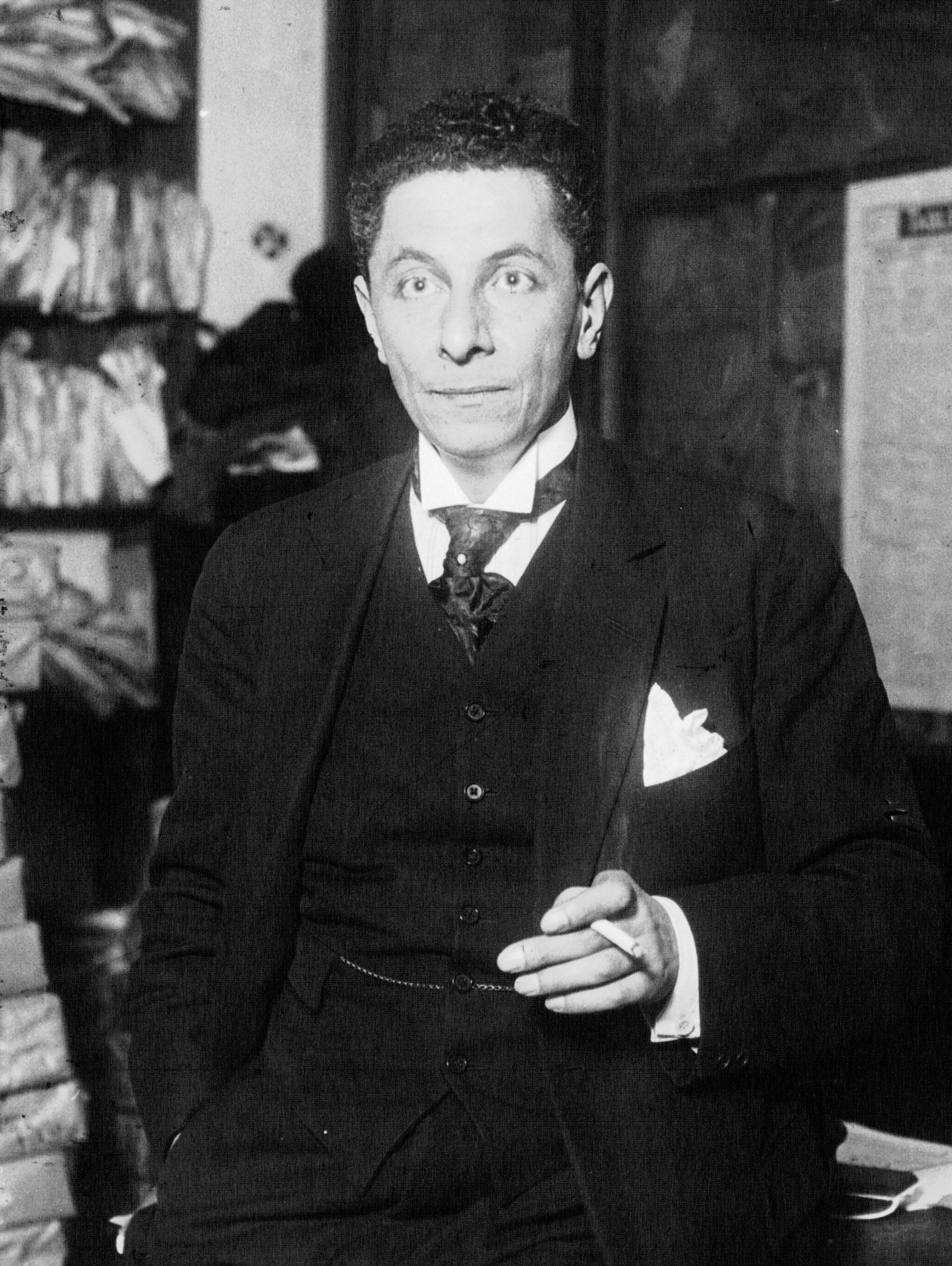
- Born: 1882; Amiens
- Died: 1947 (aged 64–65)
- Occupation: Novelist

Henri Deberly, born in 1882 in Amiens (France) and died in 1947, was a French writer, winner of the Prix Goncourt in 1926.

His avant-garde tomb in Viroflay is by the artist René Iché.

== Works ==
- Élégies et sonnets, Paris: B. Grasset, 1911.
- L'Arc-en-ciel, Paris: L' auteur, 1921. 47 p.
- Grains d'ambre et d'or. Paris: L' auteur, 1922. 45 p.
- L' Impudente, Paris: Nouvelle Revue française, 1923.
- Prosper et Broudilfagne, Paris: Nouvelle Revue Française, 1924.
- Pancloche, Paris: Gallimard, 1925.
- L'Ennemi des siens, Paris: Nouvelle Revue Française, 1925.
- Le Supplice de Phèdre, Paris: Nouvelle Revue Française, 1926.
- Luce et Thierry, Paris: Nouvelle Revue Française, 1927.
- Un homme et un autre, Paris: Nouvelle Revue Française, 1928.
- Tombes sans lauriers, Paris: Nouvelle Revue Française, 1929.
- Auguette Le Main, Paris: Nouvelle Revue Française, 1930.
- L' Agonisant, Paris: Gallimard, 1931.
- Le fils indigne, Paris: Gallimard, 1933.
- La Maison des trois veuves, Paris: Gallimard, 1935.
- La Comtesse de Farbus, Paris: Gallimard, 1937.
- La Pauvre Petite Madame Chouin, Paris: Gallimard, 1939.

== Translations ==
- Die Schamlose: Sittenroman [L' Impudente]. German trans. by Stefan Hofer. Wien - Berlin - Leipzig - New York: Renaissance Interterritorialer Verlag, 1924.
- Пытка Федры [Le Supplice de Phèdre]. Russian trans. unknown. Москва: Издательство Артели писателей "Круг", 1927.
- Мужчина и еще одинъ [Un homme et un autre]. Russian trans. by A. Kossovich. Riga: Orient, 1928.
- El suplicio de Fedra [Le Supplice de Phèdre], in Los premios Goncourt de novela: Vol. V. Buenos Aires - Barcelona - México: Plaza y Janés, 1964, pp. 480–625.
- Il supplizio di Fedra [Le Supplice de Phèdre]. Italian trans. by Antonietta Caterina Zazzara. Cernobbio (CO): Archivio Cattaneo, 2022.

== Reviews ==
- "Review: Studies in French Literature: The Best French Short Stories of 1926-27, and the Yearbook of the French Short Story by Richard Eaton, Maximilian Rudwin, The Sewanee Review, Vol. 36, No. 4 (Oct., 1928), pp. 508-509
