= La Maternelle =

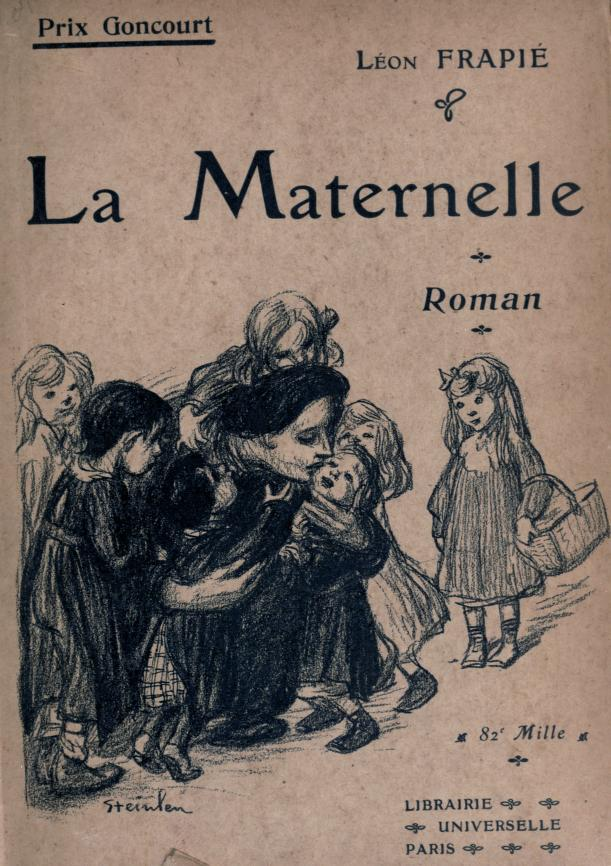

La Maternelle (1904; "The Kindergarten") is a Prix Goncourt winning novel by French author Léon Frapié. It was adapted to film as La Maternelle (1933). It is a kind of autobiographical novel by proxy since its author used not his own memories, but those of his wife, Leonie Mouillefert, whom he married in 1888. The story is about Rose, an educated girl from a well off family who faces a series of tragic events that leaves her penniless and without a home. She is forced to find work as an attendant at a day-care center in Paris with 150 children of the working class. Despite working below her station she finds herself tenderly caring for them and soon they become very fond of her.

== Plot summary ==
Rose, a young Parisian woman with full academic training is on the eve of marrying. Suddenly her father fails; she loses her dowry, and her fiancé disappears. She tries to get work, but soon finds out that her diplomas are more of a hindrance than a help. They inspire only diffidence in administrative circles. Officials always declare her too good for the position. Starvation threatens, and finally she sets to work deliberately trying to appear unintelligent and rude enough to be hired. Thus she succeeds in securing a position as "femme de service" in the "Maternelle" of the working-class quarter of Menilmontant. A "Maternelle" is a district school for children from two to six years, preparatory to the Primary school. To ease her transition to this new environment and ward off thoughts of despair she decides to keep a diary of her daily experiences. This diary shows her to be an extremely kind-hearted woman and at the same time a keen observer.

Rose has the lowest tasks in the school: she dusts, sweeps the rooms, lights the fire early in the morning, and she takes care of the children physically, all day round. Although the directress and the two subordinate teachers are her superiors, Rose is the one that comes in closest contact with the children. Rose is the one to whom they go to naturally all the time, as they would to a mother; she washes them when their nose is bleeding, in her arms they find consolation when roughly handled by a schoolmate; in her skirt they hide to find protection against angry and threatening parents. The pupils belong to the working poor, and many of them are so neglected and so miserable in their homes that the school is a better place for them to be. And the school to them is Rose.

The children include "mouse," the gentle five-year-old little mother with her brother, her "chickling;" Richard, who cannot imagine that there might exist anything like disinterested kindness and he conceives of every relation between two human beings as a bargain; Adam, the strong and noisy leader of the older boys and a great boaster, the girls who admire him because they are afraid of him. The cat Mistigris, who eats little birds and thereby stirs up the wrath of the children.

== Analysis ==
La Maternelle is a first-person account of destitute children and hunger. While similar to the socialist realism of Émile Zola (who died just a year before the novel's publication), it differs as a scathing critique of public education and its values. While Zola saw education as the remedy for almost all ailments and social ills, including poverty and cruelty, Frapié is without pity for the negative traits it taught: resignation, obedience, servility. He perceives public education, far from being the cure-all for ills of the people, as a tool for casting people into a mold of docility.

The choice of the novel as winner of the Prix Goncourt caused a stir in literary circles, some critics saw the Academie's choice as an attempt to favor the literary school of Naturalism in the eye of the public which they saw as being outdated.
