= Armande Gobry-Valle =

French woman of letters (born 1953)

Armande Gobry-Valle (born 1953) is a French woman of letters. She was a teacher in Troyes. She wrote for more than twenty years without seeking a publisher. In 1990, the éditions Viviane Hamy published Terre tranquille, a collection of short stories. She was awarded the prix Goncourt du premier roman in 1991 for Iblis ou la Défroque du serpent. The author of seven novels, Gobry-Valle is also a préfacière of art books.

== Works ==
- 1990: Terre tranquille, éditions Viviane Hamy, ISBN 9782878580006
- 1991: Iblis ou la Défroque du serpent, éd. Viviane Hamy, ISBN 9782878580129
- 1993: La Convulsion des brasiers, éd. Viviane Hamy, ISBN 9782878580372
- 1993: Un triptyque, éd. Viviane Hamy, ISBN 9782878580365
- 1995: Le Puits d'exil, éd. Viviane Hamy, ISBN 9782878580624
- 1995: Le Témoin compromis, éd. Viviane Hamy, ISBN 9782878580624
- 1997: Nocturnes, éd. Viviane Hamy, ISBN 9782878580914
- 2000: Debout parmi les ruines, éditions du Seuil, ISBN 9782020353304

== Sources ==
- Mourthé, Claude (1993). "Armande Gobry-Valle : un triptyque". Le Magazine Littéraire. No. 309. p. 85. ISSN 0024-9807.
