= The Patience Stone =

2008 novel by Atiq Rahimi

- Author: Atiq Rahimi
- Original title: Syngué sabour. Pierre de patience
- Translator: Polly Mclean
- Language: French
- Publisher: P.O.L.
- Publication date: 25 August 2008
- Publication place: France
- English publication date: 19 January 2010
- Pages: 154
- ISBN: 2846822778

The Patience Stone (French: Syngué sabour. Pierre de patience) is a 2008 novel by the French-Afghan writer Atiq Rahimi. It is also known as Stone of Patience. It received the Prix Goncourt.

== See also ==
- 2008 in literature
- Contemporary French literature
