= La Maternelle (film) =

1933 film

La Maternelle (Children of Montmartre)
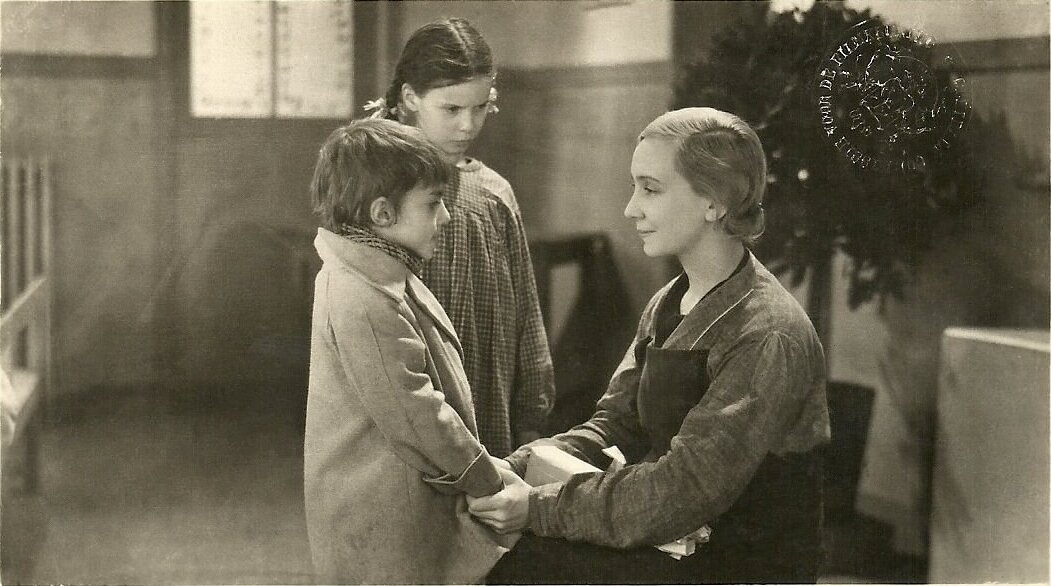
- Scene
- Directed by: Jean Benoît-Lévy; Marie Epstein
- Screenplay by: Jean Benoît-Lévy; Marie Epstein
- Story by: Léon Frapié
- Starring: Madeleine Renaud
- Cinematography: Georges Asselin
- Music by: Edouard Flament
- Distributed by: Kosmofilm (Denmark); Metropolis Pictures (U.S.)
- Release date: 16 September 1933 (France)
- Running time: 83 minutes
- Country: France
- Language: French

La Maternelle (International title: Children of Montmartre) is a 1933 French film directed and written by Jean Benoît-Lévy and Marie Epstein. It was adapted from Léon Frapié's Prix Goncourt winning novel La Maternelle (1904). This film was a remake of a less successful, silent version made in 1925 by Gaston Roudès. In 1935, it was ranked as the 6th best foreign film by the National Board of Review of Motion Pictures, and has received a 7.3 ranking (out of 10) by 127 reviewers at the Internet Movie Database.

== Novel ==
The novel of the same name was written by Léon Frapié in 1904, and received the French Literature prize known as the Prix Goncourt (The Goncourt Prize). The film was a loose adaptation of the novel, transforming it into a more psychological look into the experience of children in Parisian slums.

== Plot ==
Rose, a girl from a well off family faces a series of tragic events that leaves her penniless and without a home. She is hired as an attendant at a day-care center in Paris with 150 poor children. She finds herself tenderly caring for them and soon they become very fond of her. One young girl named Marie, who is the abandoned daughter of a prostitute, becomes so attached to Rose that she becomes jealous when anyone else steals Rose's attention. Rose discovers that Marie has been neglected and abandoned and takes Marie to live with her. Marie even tries to kill herself when she learns of Rose's plans to marry Dr. Libois, the school's physician. Additionally, Marie is let go from being the school attendant, due to her educational background making her overqualified. Despite this, La Maternelle ultimately finds its way to a happy ending, with Rose becoming engaged to Dr. Libois and being hired as a teacher at the school.

== Cast ==
- Madeleine Renaud as Rose
- Mady Berry as Mme. Paulin
- Alice Tissot as Superintendent
- Sylvette Fillacier as Mme. Coeuret
- Paulette Elambert as Marie Coeuret
- Henri Debain as Dr. Libois
- Edmond van Daele as Pantin
- Alex Bernard as Professor

== Production ==
=== Cinematography and style ===
The realistic approach to the film is supported by the utilization of working-class children as schoolchildren and location shooting. With the cinematography, this documentary style is furthered. Using exploratory shots and breaks in the fourth wall, the film establishes this style and the setting. There are short scenes within the film that do not drive the narrative forward and instead serve to strengthen the realism within the setting. Additionally, the film relies on a spirit of improvisation, especially for the children involved. However, there is influence from the European avant-garde film genre. The camera transforms into Marie's gaze in order to show her trauma and the lead-up to her suicide attempt. By fusing elements of these two styles, the film is notable and serves as an early, defining example of Poetic Realism in cinema.

=== Epstein and Benoît-Lévy ===
Acting as directors and screenwriters, La Maternelle was one of the films that emerged from the collaboration between Epstein and Benoît-Lévy that lasted more than a decade. Although screenwriting was commonly open to women, few were film directors. Epstein was the only female director of French cinema at the time, and despite her role, she is always listed after Benoît-Lévy. As research for the film, they both spent months visiting schools in the lower-class areas of Paris in order to understand how to integrate schoolchildren into the film and how to best construct the set.

== Acting ==
Paul Rotha in, “Sight and Sound” praises La Maternelle and other pictures of the time for its use of child actors to contribute to an understanding of child-psychology, calling it “one of the best films to come from France for many months.” From its directors, Benoit- Lévy and Marie Epstein, the film’s natural acting by its child actors is praised for its realism and portrayal of child-welfare. This article commends the film's depiction of the "children's mind" and their perspective on school life, which was an infrequent theme at the time. Additionally, the acting performance, specifically by Paulette Elambert who plays Marie is noted by many as some of the best cinema had seen in that period. The New York Times goes on to describe the performance as “memorable”. In his Sept 7, 1933 review, Lucien Wahl extols Elambert’s emotional range and her performative ability to bring to life feelings of friendship, affection, and jealousy in the character Marie. She is often regarded as the star of this film.

== Music ==
Though simple, the score in this film aids in creating its real-life setting. In his 1993 review in “Pour Vous”, the work of Janine Auscher commends the film’s composer Edouard Flamant. Auscher calls the film "one of the best in French production". Flamant, fashioned a simple score. The score included music by Alice Verlay who wrote the song that Rose sang to the children in the classroom. Repetition of songs is done in multiple scenes of the film to connect overall themes and important moments.

== Themes ==
=== Reflection ===
Marie sees the reflection of Rose and her new potential lover, Dr. Libois, in the same window in which she saw her mother with the man she left with at the beginning of the film. This theme is continued when Marie looks in the water and sees the reflection of two lovers, prompting her subsequent suicide attempt in an effort to erase these images that haunt her.

=== Vision ===
Throughout the film, there is a focus on the eyes of characters and different ways of looking. Specifically, Marie's gaze and trauma is central to the film. In the scene in the bar, there is an interplay of shots showing snippets of lust between Marie's mother and the man she is with and Marie angrily staring them down. After this, when Marie's mother brings her home, Marie is seen looking through the bars of her bed at her mother in an embrace with the man. Although she cannot be actually looking at her mother (because she is inside while her mother is outside), the camera serves as a way for the audience and Marie, into seeing how her mother has abandoned her. In another scene, Marie overhears Dr. Libois proposing to Rose. Once they know that she has overheard, there is an exchange of close up shots - focused on the eyes - between the three characters. These scenes serve to place the viewer in Marie's perspective and establish the trauma and the nature of the relationships between Marie and her maternal figures - her mother and Rose. In the climax of the film in which Marie attempts suicide, her gaze reflects in the water and shows her the view of an embracing couple nearby, earlier snippets of her mother and Rose, and a reflection of herself.

=== Femme moderne ===
This film is one which portrays a deviation from traditional societal norms of women, bending expectations during this time period. In this film, Rose is an educated woman who acquires a full time job before pursuing marriage and a family. Eventually, she finds both love and a family, but the film maintains that both love and work can be successfully kept by women, an idea not so common during its time.

=== Maternal relationships ===
There is a juxtaposition throughout the film between two characters - Marie's mother and Rose - and their maternal status. Marie's mother - a prostitute - functions as a "bad mother;" she neglects Marie and abandons her child to run off with a man. In the scene in which she tucks Marie in and leaves her, Marie's mother places a lipstick kiss on her forehead, demonstrating the metaphorical scars she has left on her daughter through her immorality. In contrast, Rose epitomizes what a "good mother" should be. Rose adopts Marie and becomes a maternal figure to all the children, consistently showing her love and devotion to them throughout the film.

== Critical reception ==
In 1935, the New York Times called it "a film of extraordinary insight, tenderness and tragic beauty", adding "Mr. Benoit-Levy presents a heart-breaking cross-section of this tatterdemalion kindergarten in such minor portraits as the little boy who has never learned how to smile."

Also in 1935, Variety wrote that it was "the finest foreign language film" to be screened in the United States in the previous "couple of years", that "lost nothing" from the novel in its adaptation to the screen. They continued to comment that "the casting and general production are well nigh perfect", and credited the direction of Marie Epstein for the excellent performances given by the children, particularly Paulette Elambert, and praised the performances of Madeleine Renaud and Mady Berry.

For his review in Pour Vous, Lucian Wahl describes the directors as skilled and displaying great "skill" and "heart" in the film and compliments the directors' technique. However, he sees Marie's suicide attempt as nonessential, claiming that although it has excellent imagery, it does not elevate the film. At the same time the "sincerity of the subject" is highlighted and Wahl praises the child actors for "serving the truth".

In his 1933 review for Cinémagazine, Marcel Carné states that this film is one of the first in which the audience can see a film "interpreted by young children". He applauds directors Jean Benoît-Levy and Marie Epstein for getting many intelligent children together and producing a touching film conveying "discreet emotions".

Cinema Quarterly published a particularly mixed review for the film in 1933, with about as many praises as reproaches. It stated that "the picture is notable for its brilliant treatment of the child's mind", and described the final scene as "being among the high spots of the year's cinema", but was not shy to say the film is "the child-picture to end chid-pictures for the time being".

== Awards ==
- 1935, National Board of Review, USA Award Winner- Top Foreign Films
- 2016, Boston Society of Film Critics Awards Winner- Best Rediscoveries

== Also known as ==
- Children of Montmartre: International (English title)
- La maternelle: Italy (dubbed version)
- Moderhaender: Denmark
- Mutterhände: Germany
