= Lycée Pasteur (Neuilly-sur-Seine) =

School in Neuilly-sur-Seine, France

Coordinates: 48°53′10″N 2°16′26″E

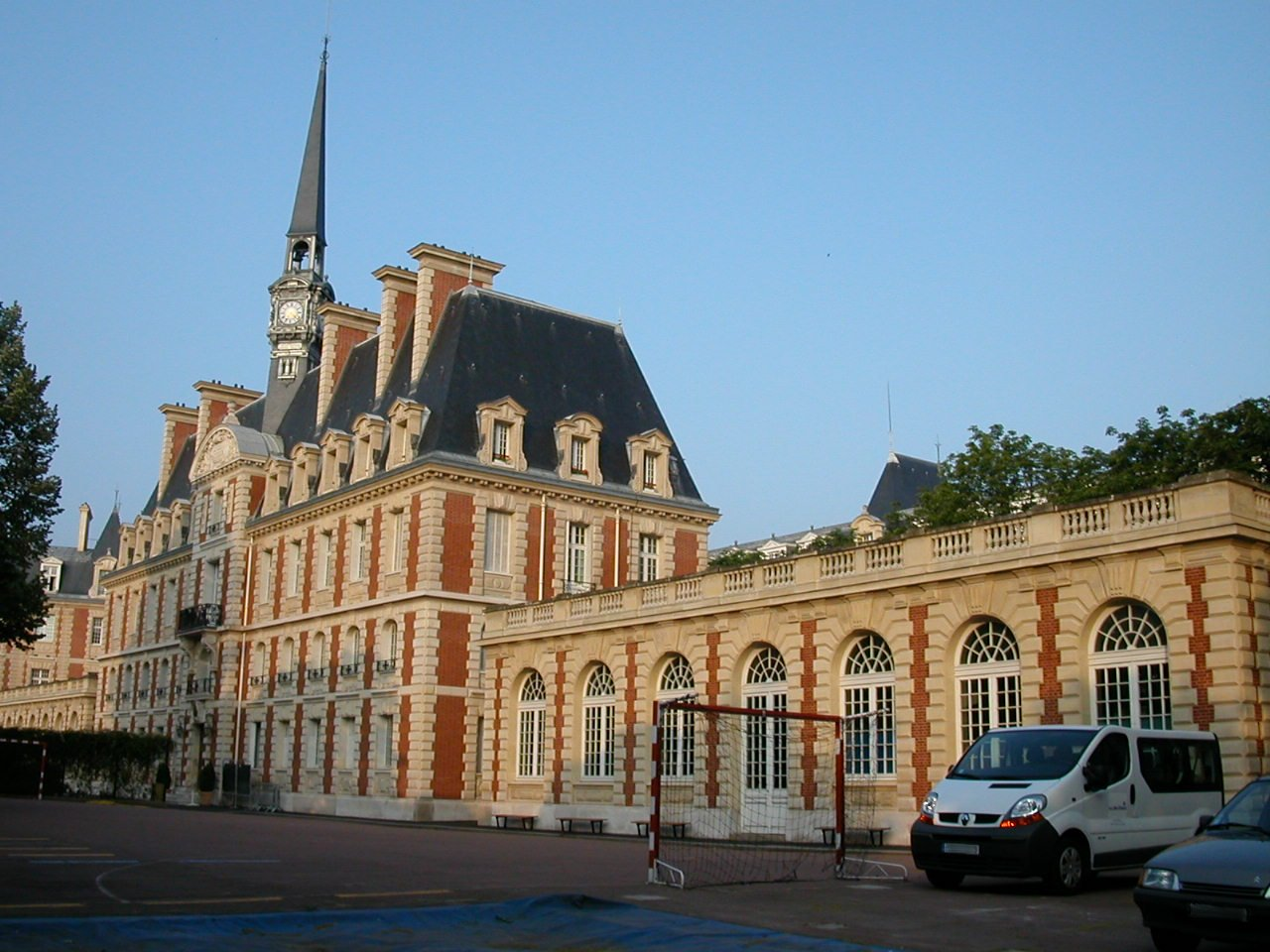
Lycée Pasteur

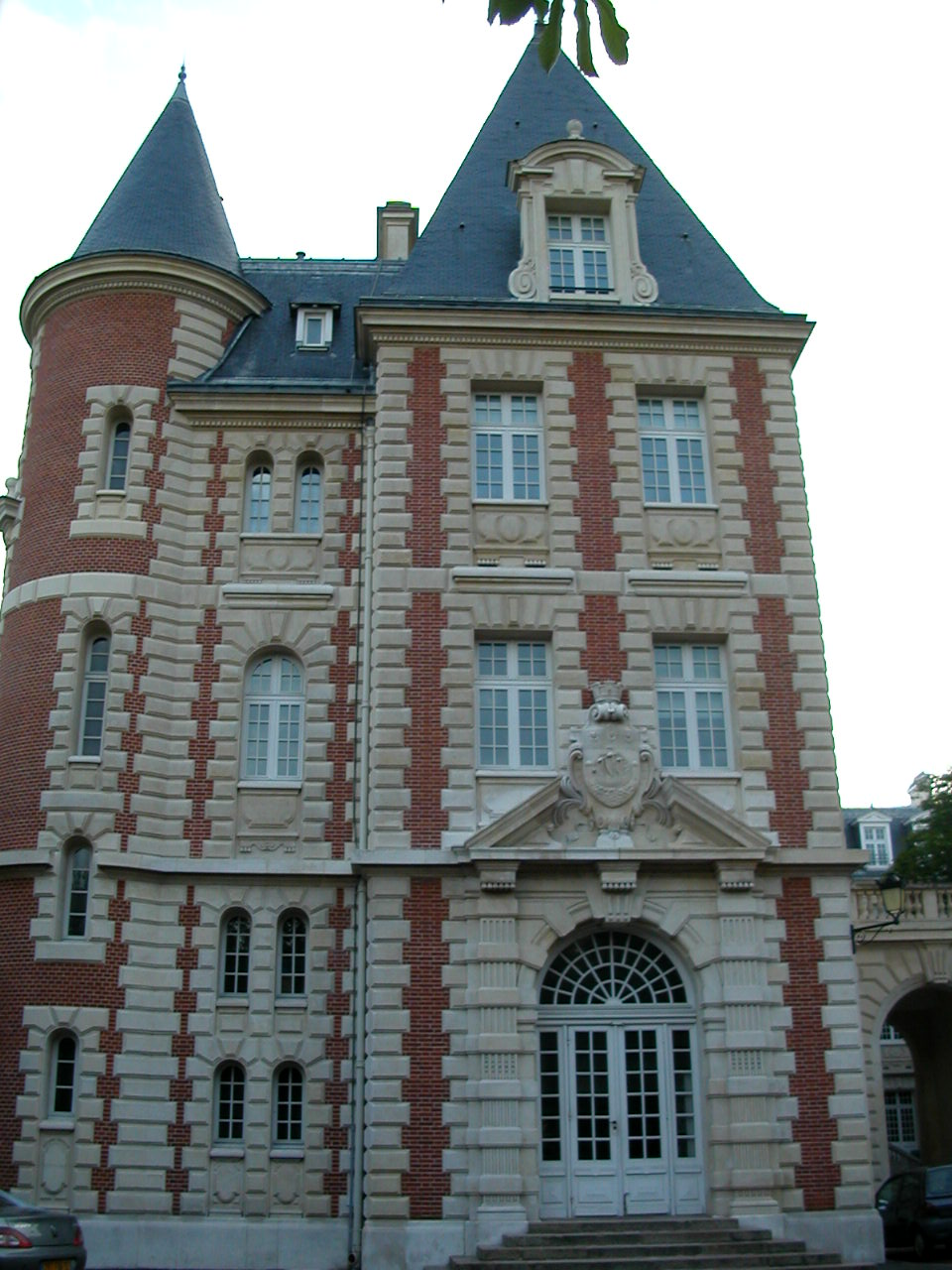
Left wing

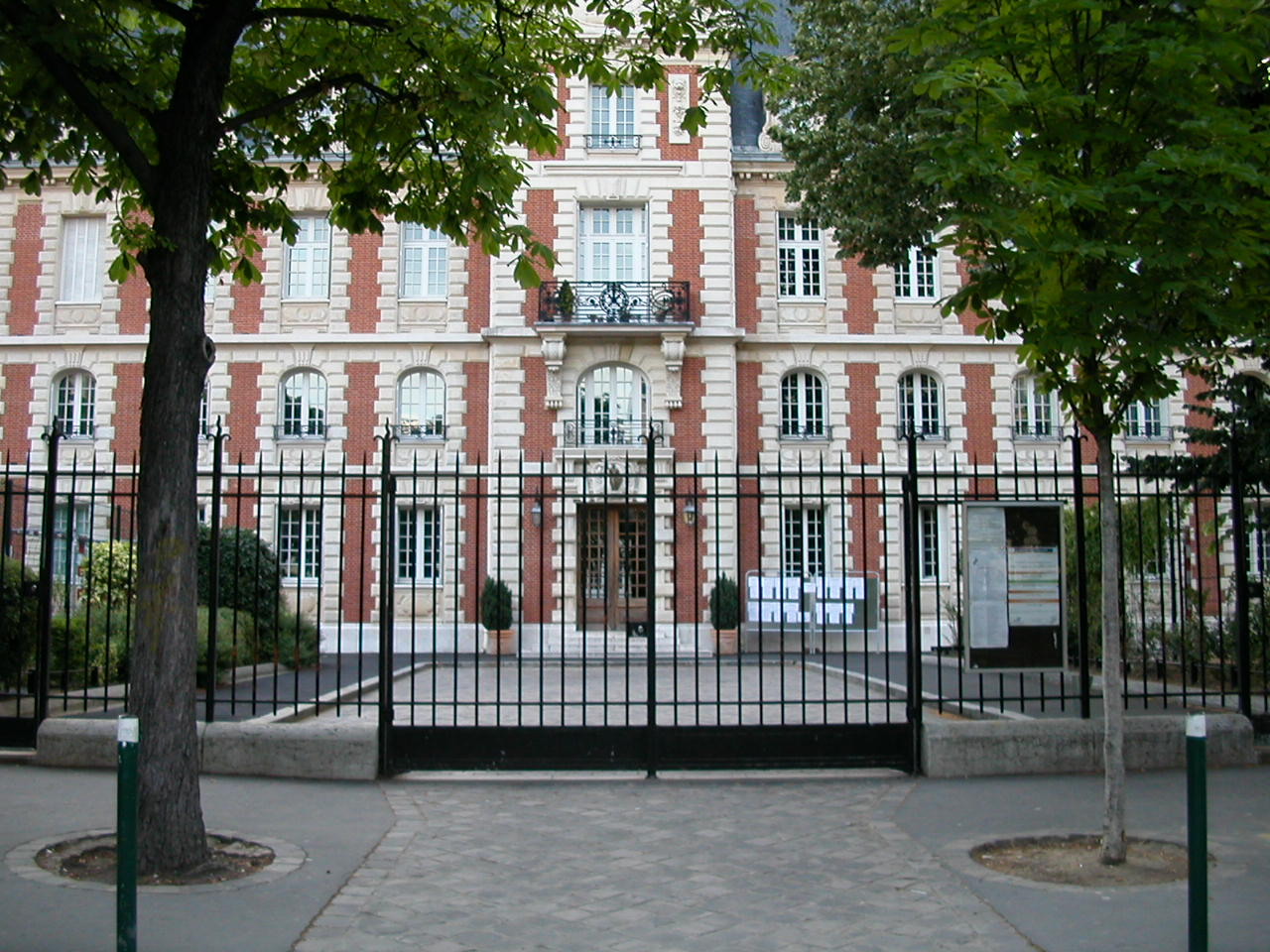
Main entrance

The Lycée Pasteur (French pronunciation: [lise pastœʁ]) is a French state-run secondary school in Neuilly-sur-Seine, on the outskirts of Paris. It accepts students from collège (the first four years of secondary education in France) through to classes préparatoires (classes to prepare students for entrance to the elite Grandes écoles). Built in the grounds of the former chateau de Neuilly, the lycée is named in honour of Louis Pasteur.

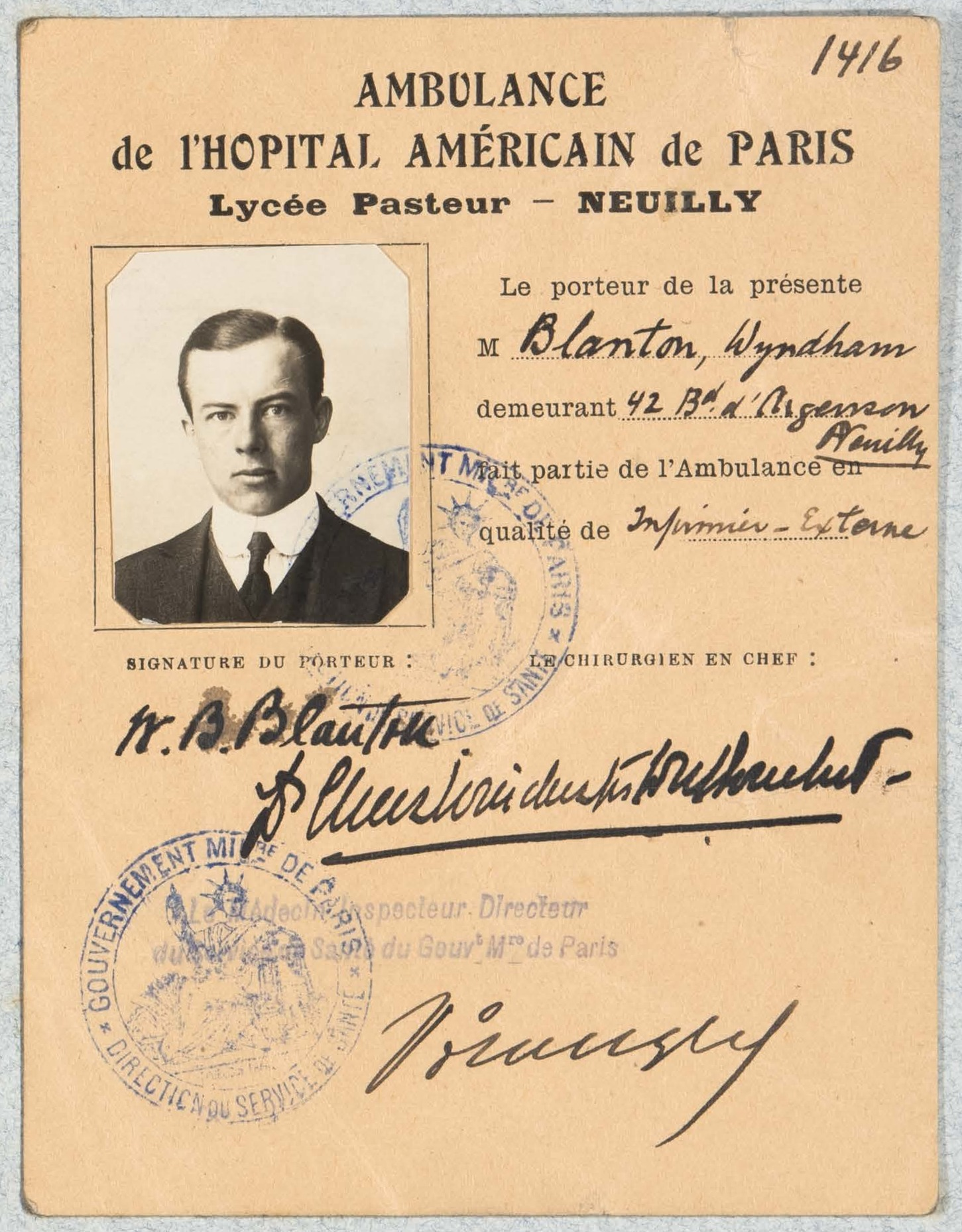
1915 identification of American Ambulance Corps driver of Lycee Pasteur during World War I

It was originally planned to open in October 1914 but with the advent of the First World War the building was instead used as a military hospital by American Field Services and not inaugurated until October 1923. It was used as the location for the film, Neuilly Yo Mama! (Neuilly sa mère !).

== Notable people ==
Former teachers

- Fernand Braudel (history)
- Daniel-Rops (history)
- François-Bernard Mâche (literature)
- Émile Moselly (literature)
- Jean-Paul Sartre (philosophy)

Former students

- Jean-Louis Aubert (songwriter, performer)
- Michel Blanc (actor and director)
- Jean-Yves Bosseur (composer)
- Jean-Luc Brylinski (mathematician)
- Gabriel Brunet de Sairigné (soldier)
- Barbara Cassin (philosopher)
- Christian Clavier (actor)
- Jacques Decour (writer and resistant)
- Jean-François Deniau (politician and writer)
- Renaud Donnedieu de Vabres (politician)
- François Hollande (politician, President of the French Republic)
- Gérard Jugnot (actor, scriptwriter)
- Bernard-Henri Lévy (writer and filmmaker)
- Thierry Lhermitte (actor)
- Chris Marker (filmmaker, writer, photographer)
- André Santini (lawyer and politician)
- Jean Sarkozy (son of Nicolas Sarkozy)
- Christian Sautter (politician)
- Henri Troyat (writer)
- Dimitri Obolensky (Historian)
- Lucas Bravo (actor)

== Notes and sources ==
Notes

Sources

- This page is translated and condensed from its French equivalent.
- "Les origins du lycée" [The lycée's origins] (in French). Neuilly-sur-Seine: Cité Scolaire Pasteur.
