= Saint-Germain ou la négociation =

Belgian novel by Francis Walder published in 1958

Saint-Germain ou la négociation is a Belgian novel by Francis Walder. It was first published in 1958 and won that year's Prix Goncourt. It tells the story of the negotiation of the Peace of Saint-Germain-en-Laye, which ended the third French War of Religion in August 1570.

== Adaptations ==
A TV movie version was made in 2003, starring Jean Rochefort as Henri de Malassise and Marie-Christine Barrault as Catherine de' Medici.
