= Émile Moselly =

French novelist (1870–1918)

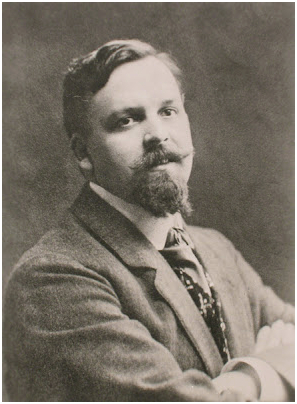
Émile Moselly

Émile Moselly (real name: Émile Chenin; 12 August 1870 – 2 October 1918) was a French novelist.

== Biography ==
Moselly was born in Paris. He graduated with an Associate of Arts degree in the exams of 1895 (he was then 25 years old). He taught at Montauban, Orleans, in Paris (Lycée Voltaire) and Neuilly-sur-Seine (Lycée Pasteur). He appeared with Charles Péguy, among the first authors of the Cahiers de la Quinzaine (founded in 1901 by Peguy).

He was a regionalist author, deeply rooted in rural Lorraine where he is often in the paternal home of Chaudeney-sur-Moselle (Canton of Toul). He received the Prix Goncourt in 1907 for Le Rouet d'Ivoire. He died suddenly (heart attack) between Lorient and Quimper, in Chaudeney-sur-Moselle on 2 October 1918 in the Quimper-Paris train, back from holidays spent at Lesconil.

His archives (manuscripts, corrected proofs) were given in 2007 by his family to the city of Nancy; they are deposited at Bibliothèque municipale de Nancy.

== Works ==
- L'Aube fraternelle,
- Contes de guerre pour Jean-Pierre,
- Les Etudiants,
- Fils de gueux,
- Les Grenouilles dans la mare,
- La Houle,
- Jean des Brebis ou le livre de la misère,
- Joson Meunier : histoire d'un paysan lorrain,
- Le Journal de Gottfried Mauser ,
- Le Rouet d'ivoire : enfances lorraines ,
- Terres lorraines.
- La Charrue d'Érable.
