= René Maran =

French poet and novelist (1887–1960)

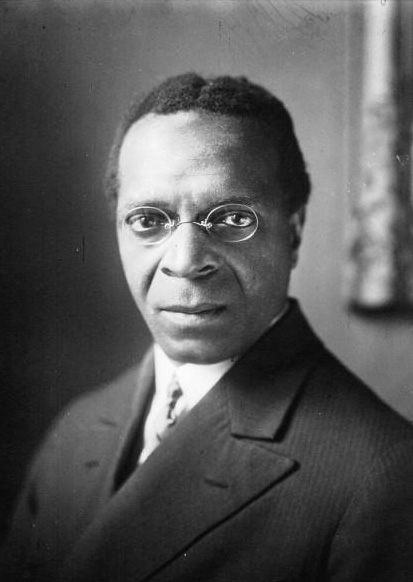
- René Maran, 1930
- Born: 5 November 1887; Born at sea (en route to Fort-de-France, Martinique)
- Died: 9 May 1960 (aged 72); France
- Occupations: Poet, novelist, colonial administrator
- Writing career
- Notable work: Batouala (1921, Prix Goncourt)
- Notable awards: Prix Goncourt (1921)
- Literary movement: Négritude

René Maran (5 November 1887 – 9 May 1960) was a French poet and novelist, and the first black writer to win the French Prix Goncourt (in 1921).

== Biography ==
Maran was born on the boat carrying his parents to Fort-de-France, Martinique where he lived until the age of seven. After that he went to Gabon, where his father Héménéglide Maran was in the colonial service. After attending boarding school in Bordeaux, France, he joined the French Colonial service in French Equatorial Africa. It was his experience there that was the basis for many of his novels, including Batouala: A True Black Novel, which won the Prix Goncourt.

W. E. B. Du Bois applauded Maran, saying of his writings in an article which would be incorporated into the pivotal Harlem Renaissance text The New Negro, "Maran's attack on France and on the black French deputy from Senegal has gone into the courts and marks an era. Never before have Negroes criticized the work of the French in Africa."

Since the 1920s he was active in the French anticolonialist movement and supportive of organisations like the Ligue universelle de défense de la race noire or the Comité de défense de la race noire.

Jean-Paul Sartre alluded to Maran in his preface to Frantz Fanon's The Wretched of the Earth, mocking the French establishment's complacent self-congratulation that they had "on one occasion given the Prix Goncourt to a Negro". His novel Un Homme pareil aux autres is the subject of extensive analysis in the third chapter of Fanon's Black Skin, White Masks.

== Tribute ==
On 5 November 2019 Google celebrated his 132nd birthday with a Google Doodle.

== Selected works ==
- 1909 : La Maison du Bonheur (poetry)
- 1912 : La Vie intérieure, poems 1909–1912, Paris, Ed. du Beffroi, 157 p.
- 1921 : Batouala, Prix Goncourt, Paris, Ed. Albin Michel, 169 p. BnF 308753665
- 1922 : Le Visage calme, Paris, Ed. du Monde nouveau, 87 p.
- 1924 : Le Petit Roi de Chimérie, Paris, Ed. Albin Michel, 237 p.
- 1927 : Djouma, chien de Brousse, novel, Paris, Ed. Albin Michel, 253 p.
- 1931 : Le Cœur serré, autobiographie, Paris, Ed. Albin Michel, 252 p. BnF 36566415w
- 1931 : Asepsie noire !, Paris- Laboratoire Martinet, 45 p., illustrations.
- 1934 : Le Livre de la Brousse, novel, Paris, Ed. Albin Michel, 287 p. BnF 324155542
- 1935 : Les Belles images, poems, Bordeaux, Ed. Delmas, 83 p.
- 1938 : Livingstone et l'Exploration de l'Afrique, Paris, Gallimard, collection La découverte du monde, 276 p. ISBN 9782071015084
- 1941 : Bêtes de la brousse, Paris, Ed. Albin Michel, 253 p. BnF 32415543d
- 1941 : Brazza et la Fondation de l'A.E.F, Paris, Gallimard, La découverte du monde collection, 307 p. ISBN 9782071015091
- 1943 : Les Pionniers de l'Empire (book 1), Paris, Ed. Albin Michel, 331 p.
- 1943 : Mbala, l'éléphant, Illustrations by André Collot, Paris, Ed. Arc-en-Ciel, 187 p. BnF 324155600
- 1944 : Peine de cœur, Paris, S.P.L.E., Ed. Univers, 207 p.
- 1946 : Les Pionniers de l'Empire (book 2), Paris, Ed. Albin Michel, 413 p.
- 1947 : Un homme pareil aux autres, Paris, Ed. Arc-en-Ciel, 248 p. BnF 32415549g
- 1951 : Savorgnan de Brazza, Paris, Éditions du Dauphin, 246 p., ill.
- 1957 : Félix Eboué, grand commis et loyal serviteur, 1885-1944, Paris, Éditions Parisiennes.
- 1953 : Bacouya, le Cynocéphale, novel, Ed. Albin Michel, 240 p.
- 1958 : Le Livre du souvenir, BnF 32415559s
