= Shmuel T. Meyer =

French-Israeli writer (born 1957)

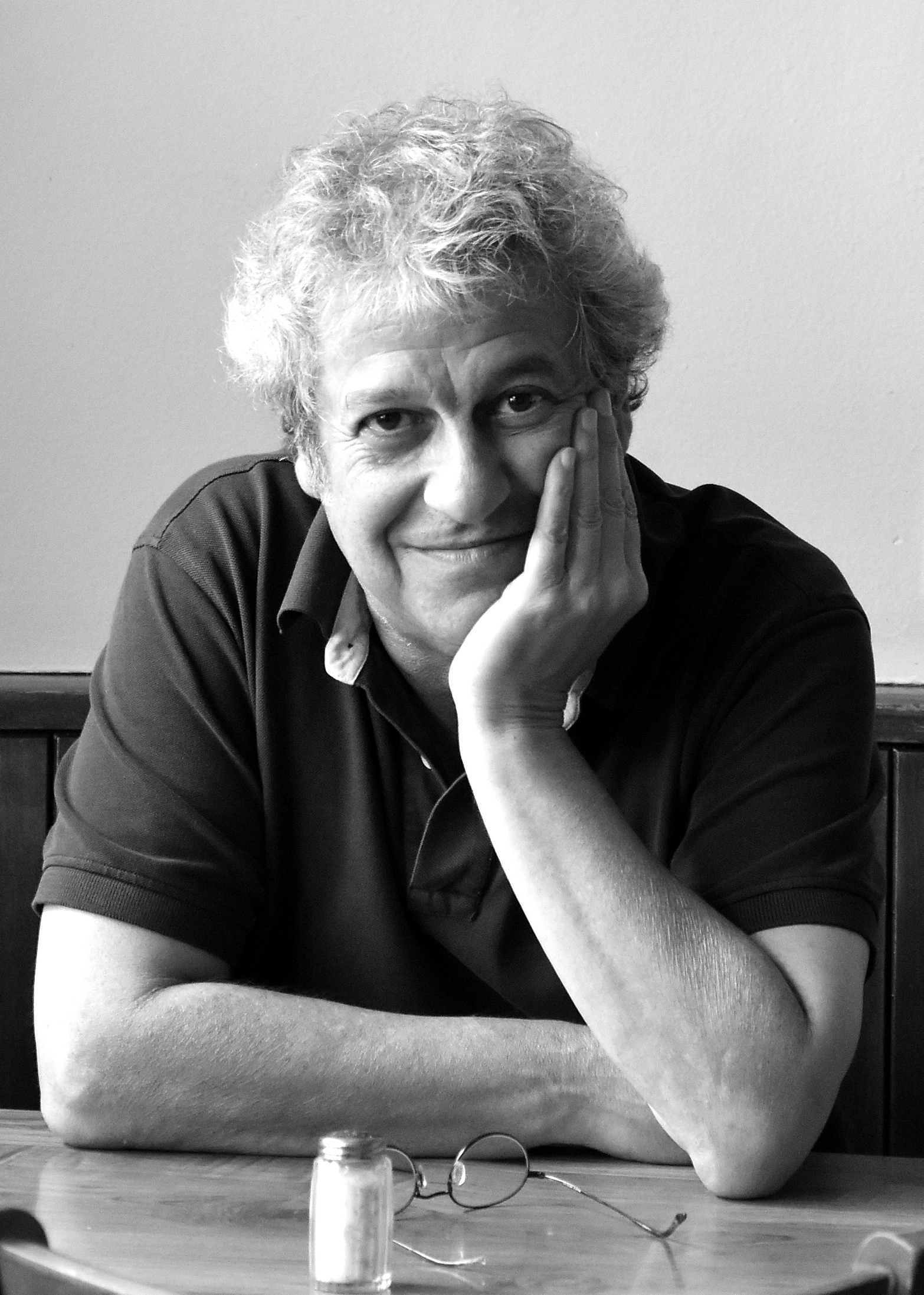
- Shmuel T. Meyer
- Born: 1957 (age 68–69); France
- Occupation: Author

Shmuel T. Meyer is a French-Israeli author. He won the Prix Goncourt in 2021 for his short story trilogy, Et la guerre est finie...
