= Jean-Jacques Schuhl =

French author

Jean-Jacques Schuhl (born 9 October 1941 in Marseille) is a French author, recipient of the 2000 Prix Goncourt literary award for his novel Ingrid Caven. The book is named for the German actress and singer Ingrid Caven, who is his partner. Despite appearances, the novel is not her biography.

== Works ==
- Rose Poussière (1972)
- Télex N° 1 (1972)
- Ingrid Caven (2000)
- Entrée des fantômes, Paris, Gallimard, coll. « L'Infini » (2010)
- Obsessions (nouvelles), Paris, Gallimard, coll. « L'Infini » (2014)
