= Alain Brunet =

French scholar

Alain Brunet is a French scholar and specialist on the writer Colette. He served as vice-president of the Société des Amis de Colette. He co-edited the collected works of Colette and co-authored her biography with Claude Pichois. The book won the Prix Goncourt.
