= Prix Goncourt =

French literary award

- Awarded for: "the best and most imaginative prose work of the year"
- Date: November, annual
- Country: France
- Presented by: Académie Goncourt
- Reward: €10
- First award: 1903
- Website: academiegoncourt.com

The Prix Goncourt (French: Le prix Goncourt [lə pʁi ɡɔ̃kuʁ], "The Goncourt Prize") is a prize in French literature, given by the académie Goncourt to the author of "the best and most imaginative prose work of the year". The prize carries a symbolic reward of only 10 euros, but results in considerable recognition and book sales for the winning author. Four other prizes are also awarded: prix Goncourt du Premier Roman (first novel), prix Goncourt de la Nouvelle (short story), prix Goncourt de la Poésie (poetry) and prix Goncourt de la Biographie (biography). Of the "big six" French literary awards, the Prix Goncourt is the best known and most prestigious. The other major literary prizes include the Grand Prix du roman de l'Académie française, the Prix Femina, the Prix Renaudot, the Prix Interallié and the Prix Médicis.

== History ==
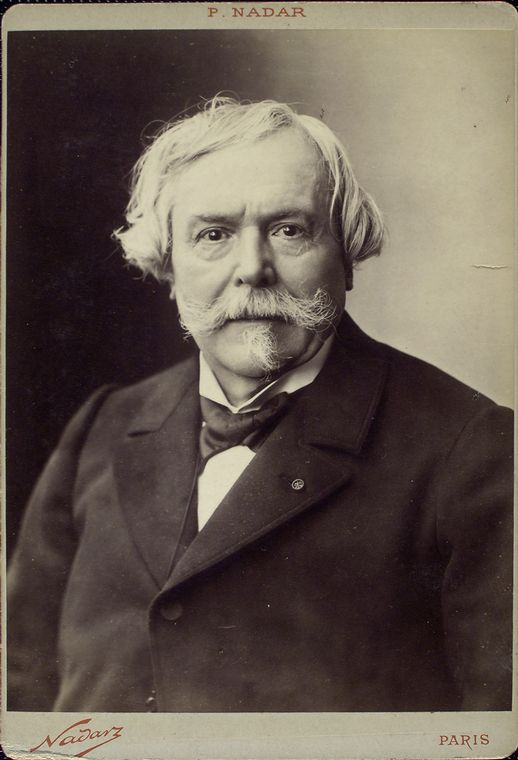
Edmond de Goncourt

Edmond de Goncourt, a successful author, critic, and publisher, bequeathed his estate for the foundation and maintenance of the Académie Goncourt. In honour of his brother and collaborator, Jules Alfred Huot de Goncourt (1830–1870), the académie has awarded the Prix Goncourt every December since 1903. The jury that determines the winner meets at the Drouant restaurant in November to make its decision. Notable winners of the prize include Marcel Proust (In Search of Lost Time), Simone de Beauvoir (The Mandarins), André Malraux (Man's Fate) and Marguerite Duras (The Lover).

The award was initially established to provide talented new authors with a monetary award that would allow them to write a second book. Today, the Goncourt has a token prize amount (around 10 euros), about the same amount given in 1903, and so the prestige of the prize has been explained not because of the cash-value of the prize, but "in terms of the tremendous book sales it effects: the Goncourt winner becomes an instant millionaire." Hervé Le Tellier's The Anomaly, which won the Goncourt in 2020, exceeded a million copies in less than a year after its publication.

In 1988, the Prix Goncourt des Lycéens was established, as a collaboration between the académie Goncourt, the French Ministry of Education, and Fnac, a book, music, and movie retailer.

The Prix Renaudot is announced at the same ceremony as the Prix Goncourt. It has become known as something of a second-place prize.

=== Controversies ===
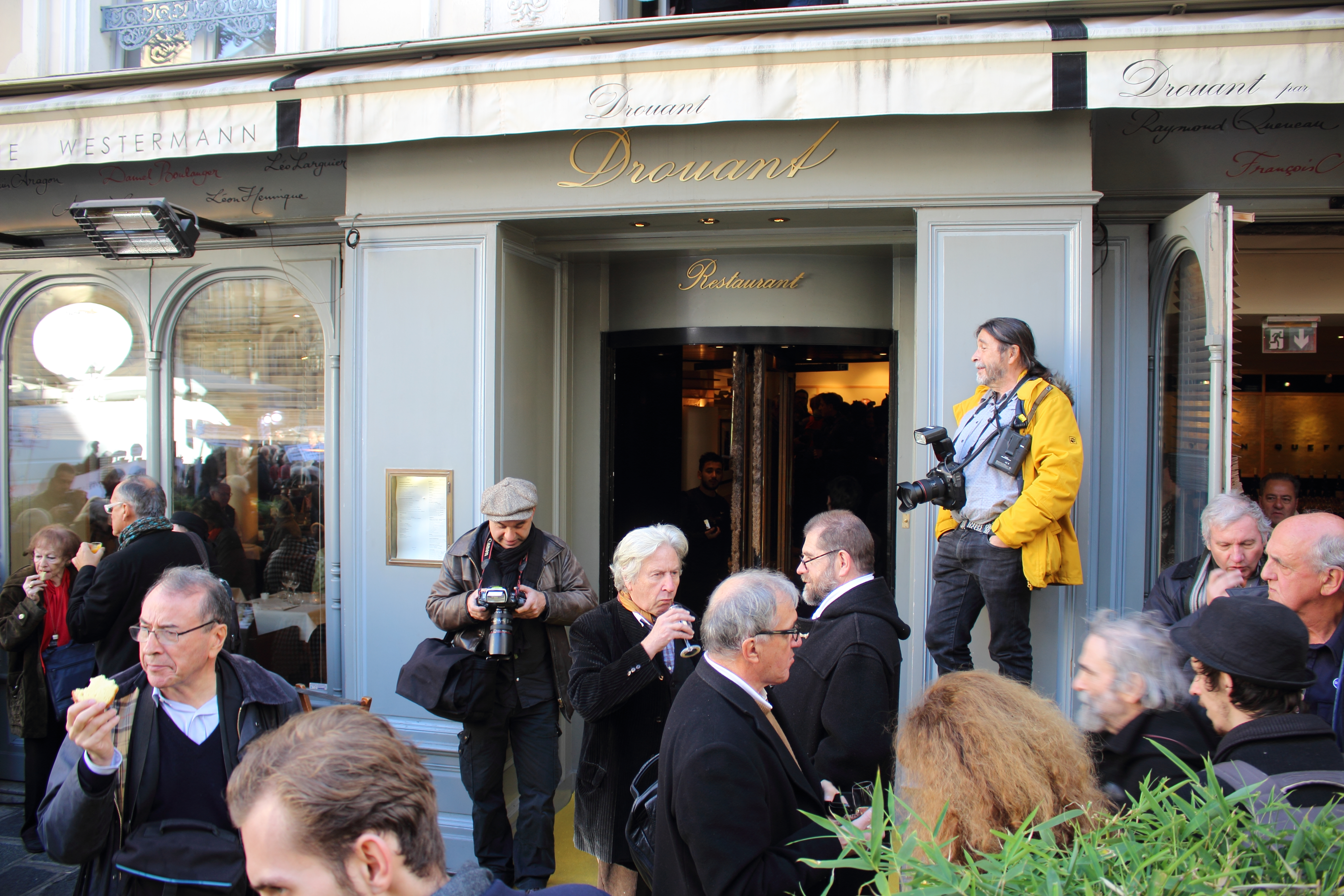
Journalists at Le Drouant restaurant, 2016 Prix Goncourt.

Within months of the first prize in 1903, it spawned a "hostile counter-prize" in the form of the Prix Femina to counter the all-male Jury of the Goncourt with an all-female jury on the Femina.

Some choices have been controversial. One famous example was the awarding of the prize to Marcel Proust in 1919, which sparked public indignation since many believed that it should have gone to Roland Dorgelès for Les Croix de bois, a novel about the First World War. The prize was supposed to be awarded to promising young authors, whereas Proust was not considered "young" at 48 – however Proust was a beginning author which is the only eligibility requirement, age being unimportant.

In 1921, Rene Maran won the Goncourt with Batouala, veritable roman negre, the first French novel to openly criticize European colonialism in Africa. The novel caused "violent reactions" and was banned in all the French colonies.

In 1932, the prize was controversial for passing up Louis-Ferdinand Céline's Voyage au bout de la nuit for Guy Mazeline's Les Loups. The voting process became the basis of the 1992 book Goncourt 32 by Eugène Saccomano.

Although the award may only be given to an author once, Romain Gary won it twice, in 1956 for Les racines du ciel and again under the pseudonym Émile Ajar in 1975 for La vie devant soi. The Académie Goncourt awarded the prize to Ajar without knowing his real identity. A period of literary intrigue followed. Gary's cousin's son Paul Pavlowitch posed as the author for a time. Gary later revealed the truth in his posthumous book Vie et mort d'Émile Ajar.

In September 2021, the Goncourt attracted controversy after the jury decided, by a vote of 7 to 3, to include Les enfants de Cadillac by François Noudelmann on its 2021 list of finalists. Noudelmann is the partner of Camille Laurens, who is a member of the prize's jury. Laurens voted in favor of her partner's book. In October 2021, the Académie Goncourt ultimately decided that it will no longer allow lovers and family members of the jury to be entered for consideration.

== Selection and voting process ==
The Prix Goncourt is divided into three selection stages. The first selection is typically composed of fifteen finalists. The second selection is typically composed of eight finalists, narrowed down from the previous fifteen. A third and final selection leaves four finalists.

In the voting rounds, a maximum of fourteen rounds can be carried out. To begin the deliberation process, the names of the four finalists are placed in a champagne bucket. In turn, the names are taken out and each member of the jury votes aloud in favour of, or in opposition to, the writer. An absolute majority—more than half the votes cast—is required until the tenth round, then a simple majority is sufficient to designate a winner. If, after fourteen rounds, there is no winner, the president's vote counts as double to determine a majority vote. At 12:45 p.m., the Secretary General, currently Philippe Claudel, appears in front of the crowd of journalists and announces the winner. The winner typically waits in a cafe near the Drouant so that they can arrive in time. The winner is interviewed by the media and is offered a symbolic check for ten euros.

== Winners ==
Prix Goncourt winners
Year	Author	French title	English title	Transl. year	Film title	Film year	Notes	Publisher (x time)
1903	John Antoine Nau	Force ennemie	Enemy Force	2010	—N/a	—N/a		La Plume
1904	Léon Frapié	La Maternelle	—N/a	—N/a	La Maternelle	1933		Albin Michel
1905	Claude Farrère	Les Civilisés	—N/a	—N/a	—N/a	—N/a		Paul Ollendorff
1906	Jean and Jérôme Tharaud	Dingley, l'illustre écrivain	—N/a	—N/a	—N/a	—N/a		Édouard Pelletan
1907	Émile Moselly	Le Rouet d'ivoire and Jean des Brebis ou le livre de la misère	—N/a	—N/a	—N/a	—N/a	(Note: Pseudonym of Émile Chénin)	Plon
1908	Francis de Miomandre	Écrit sur de l'eau...	—N/a	—N/a	—N/a	—N/a		Édition du Feu, later Émile-Paul Frères
1909	Marius-Ary Leblond	En France	—N/a	—N/a	—N/a	—N/a		Fasquelle
1910	Louis Pergaud	De Goupil à Margot	—N/a	—N/a	—N/a	—N/a		Mercure de France
1911	Alphonse de Châteaubriant	Monsieur des Lourdines	The Keynote	1912	Monsieur des Lourdines	1943		Grasset
1912	André Savignon	Les Filles de la pluie	—N/a	—N/a	—N/a	—N/a		Grasset (2)
1913	Marc Elder	Le peuple de la mer	—N/a	—N/a	—N/a	—N/a		Calmann-Lévy
1914	Adrien Bertrand	L'Appel du Sol	The Call of the Soil	1919	—N/a	—N/a	(Note: Awarded in 1916. See footnote.)	Calmann-Lévy (2)
1915	René Benjamin	Gaspard	Private Gaspard	1916	—N/a	—N/a		Fayard
1916	Henri Barbusse	Le Feu	Under Fire	1917	—N/a	—N/a	(Note: See footnote.)	Flammarion
1917	Henry Malherbe	La Flamme au poing	The Flame That Is France	1918	—N/a	—N/a		Albin Michel (2)
1918	Georges Duhamel	Civilisation	Civilization	1919	—N/a	—N/a		Mercure de France (2)
1919	Marcel Proust	A l'ombre des jeunes filles en fleurs	Within a Budding Grove	1920	—N/a	—N/a	(Note: Volume 2 of In Search of Lost Time)	Gallimard
1920	Ernest Pérochon	Nêne	Nêne	1920	Nène	1924		Plon (2)
1921	René Maran	Batouala	Batouala	1921	—N/a	—N/a		Albin Michel (3)
1922	Henri Béraud	Le vitriol de la lune and Le martyre de l'obèse	—N/a	—N/a	—N/a	—N/a		Albin Michel (4)
1923	Lucien Fabre	Rabevel ou Le mal des ardents	—N/a	—N/a	—N/a	—N/a		Gallimard (2)
1924	Thierry Sandre	Le Chèvrefeuille, le Purgatoire, le Chapitre XIII	—N/a	—N/a	—N/a	—N/a		Gallimard (3)
1925	Maurice Genevoix	Raboliot	—N/a	—N/a	Raboliot; Raboliot; Raboliot	1946; 1972; 2008		Grasset (3)
1926	Henri Deberly	Le supplice de Phèdre	—N/a	—N/a	—N/a	—N/a		Gallimard (4)
1927	Maurice Bedel	Jérôme 60° latitude nord	Jerome: or, The Latitude of Love	1928	—N/a	—N/a		Gallimard (5)
1928	Maurice Constantin-Weyer	Un Homme se penche sur son passé	A Man Scans His Past	1929	Un homme se penche sur son passé Les amants de rivière rouge	1958; 1996		Rieder
1929	Marcel Arland	L'Ordre	—N/a	—N/a	L'Ordre	1985		Gallimard (6)
1930	H. Fauconnier	Malaisie	The Soul of Malaya or Malaisie	1931	—N/a	—N/a		Stock
1931	Jean Fayard	Mal d'amour	Desire	1931	—N/a	—N/a		Fayard (2)
1932	Guy Mazeline	Les Loups	The Wolves	1935	—N/a	—N/a		Gallimard (7)
1933	André Malraux	La Condition humaine	Man's Fate	1934	—N/a	—N/a		Gallimard (8)
1934	Roger Vercel	Capitaine Conan	Captain Conan	1935	Capitaine Conan	1996		Albin Michel (5)
1935	Joseph Peyre	Sang et Lumières	—N/a	—N/a	—N/a	—N/a		Grasset (4)
1936	Maxence Van Der Meersch	L'Empreinte de Dieu	Hath Not the Potter	1937	—N/a	—N/a		Albin Michel (6)
1937	Charles Plisnier	Faux passeports	—N/a	—N/a	—N/a	—N/a	(Note: First foreigner to win Prix Goncourt.)	Corrêa
1938	Henri Troyat	L'Araigne	—N/a	—N/a	—N/a	—N/a		Plon (3)
1939	Philippe Hériat	Les enfants gâtés	—N/a	—N/a	—N/a	—N/a		Gallimard (9)
1940	Francis Ambrière	Les grandes vacances	The Long Holiday	1948	—N/a	—N/a	(Note: Published and awarded in 1946 due to WWII. Non-fiction memoir.)	Nouvelle France
1941	Henri Pourrat	Vent de Mars	—N/a	—N/a	—N/a	—N/a		Gallimard (10)
1942	Marc Bernard	Pareil à des enfants	—N/a	—N/a	—N/a	—N/a		Gallimard (11)
1943	Marius Grout	Passage de l'Homme	When the Man Passed By	1962	—N/a	—N/a		Gallimard (12)
1944	Elsa Triolet	Le premier accroc coûte 200 Francs	A Fine of Two Hundred Francs	1947	—N/a	—N/a		Denoël
1945	Jean-Louis Bory	Mon village à l'heure allemande	—N/a	—N/a	—N/a	—N/a		Flammarion (2)
1946	Jean-Jacques Gautier	Histoire d'un Fait divers	—N/a	—N/a	—N/a	—N/a		Julliard
1947	Jean-Louis Curtis	Les Forêts de la Nuit	The Forests of the Night	1950	—N/a	—N/a		Julliard (2)
1948	Maurice Druon	Les grandes familles	The Rise of Simon Lachaume	1952	The Possessors; Les grandes familles	1958; 1989		Julliard (3)
1949	Robert Merle	Week-end à Zuydcoote	Week-end at Zuydcoote	1950	Weekend at Dunkirk	1964		Gallimard (13)
1950	Paul Colin	Les jeux sauvages	Savage Play	1953	—N/a	—N/a		Gallimard (14)
1951	Julien Gracq	Le Rivage des Syrtes	The Opposing Shore	1986	—N/a	—N/a	(Note: Refused prize.)	José Corti
1952	Béatrix Beck	Léon Morin, prêtre	The Priest (UK), The Passionate Heart (US)	1953	Léon Morin, Priest; Léon Morin, prêtre	1961; 1991		Gallimard (15)
1953	Pierre Gascar	Les Bêtes	—N/a	—N/a	—N/a	—N/a		Gallimard (16)
1954	Simone de Beauvoir	Les Mandarins	The Mandarins	1957	—N/a	—N/a		Gallimard (17)
1955	Roger Ikor	Les eaux mêlées	—N/a	—N/a	Les eaux mêlées	1969		Albin Michel (7)
1956	Romain Gary	Les racines du ciel	The Roots of Heaven	1957	The Roots of Heaven	1958		Gallimard (18)
1957	Roger Vailland	La Loi	The Law	1958	The Law	1959		Gallimard (19)
1958	Francis Walder	Saint-Germain ou la négociation	—N/a	—N/a	—N/a	—N/a		Gallimard (20)
1959	André Schwarz-Bart	Le dernier des Justes	The Last of the Just	1960	—N/a	—N/a		Seuil
1960	Vintilă Horia	Dieu est né en exil	God Was Born in Exile	1961	—N/a	—N/a		Fayard (3)
1961	Jean Cau	La pitié de Dieu	The Mercy of God	1963	—N/a	—N/a		Gallimard (21)
1962	Anna Langfus	Les bagages de sable	The Lost Shore	1964	—N/a	—N/a		Gallimard (22)
1963	Armand Lanoux	Quand la mer se retire	—N/a	—N/a	Quand la mer se retire	1963		Julliard (4)
1964	Georges Conchon	L'Etat sauvage	—N/a	—N/a	The Savage State	1978		Albin Michel (8)
1965	Jacques Borel	L'Adoration	The Bond	1968	—N/a	—N/a		Gallimard (23)
1966	Edmonde Charles-Roux	Oublier Palerme	To Forget Palermo	1968	Dimenticare Palermo	1990		Grasset (5)
1967	André Pieyre de Mandiargues	La Marge	The Margin	1970	The Margin	1976		Gallimard (24)
1968	Bernard Clavel	Les fruits de l'hiver	The Fruits of Winter	1969	—N/a	—N/a		Robert Laffont
1969	Félicien Marceau	Creezy	Creezy	1970	Creezy	1974		Gallimard (25)
1970	Michel Tournier	Le Roi des Aulnes	The Erl-King (UK) or The Ogre (US)	1972	The Ogre	1996		Gallimard (26)
1971	Jacques Laurent	Les Bêtises	—N/a	—N/a	—N/a	—N/a		Grasset (6)
1972	Jean Carrière	L'Epervier de Maheux	—N/a	—N/a	—N/a	—N/a		Pauvert
1973	Jacques Chessex	L'Ogre	A Father's Love (1975) or The Tyrant (2012)	1975	—N/a	—N/a	(Note: The translated editions from 1975 & 2012 are the same by Martin Sokolinsky.)	Grasset (7)
1974	Pascal Lainé	La Dentellière	A Web of Lace (1976) or The Lacemaker (2008)	1976	The Lacemaker	1977		Gallimard (27)
1975	Émile Ajar (Romain Gary)	La vie devant soi	Momo (1978) or The Life Before Us (1986)	1978	Madame Rosa; The Life Ahead	1977; 2020	(Note: The rules of the Prix Goncourt state that an author can win only once. Gary had already won in 1956 for Les racines du ciel. However, since La vie devant soi was published under the pseudonym Émile Ajar, the Académie Goncourt awarded the prize without knowing the author's true identity. Gary's cousin's son Paul Pavlowitch posed as the author for a time.)	Mercure de France (3)
1976	Patrick Grainville	Les Flamboyants	—N/a	—N/a	—N/a	—N/a		Seuil (2)
1977	Didier Decoin	John l'enfer	—N/a	—N/a	—N/a	—N/a		Seuil (3)
1978	Patrick Modiano	Rue des boutiques obscures	Missing Person	1980	—N/a	—N/a		Gallimard (28)
1979	Antonine Maillet	Pélagie-la-Charrette	Pélagie: The Return to Acadie	1982	—N/a	—N/a		Grasset (8)
1980	Yves Navarre	Le Jardin d'acclimatation	Cronus' Children	1986	—N/a	—N/a		Flammarion (3)
1981	Lucien Bodard	Anne-Marie	—N/a	—N/a	—N/a	—N/a		Grasset (9)
1982	Dominique Fernandez	Dans la main de l'Ange	—N/a	—N/a	—N/a	—N/a		Grasset (10)
1983	Frédérick Tristan	Les égarés	The Lost Ones	1991	—N/a	—N/a		Balland
1984	Marguerite Duras	L'Amant	The Lover	1986	The Lover	1992		Minuit
1985	Yann Queffélec	Les Noces barbares	The Wedding	1987	The Cruel Embrace	1987		Gallimard (29)
1986	Michel Host	Valet de nuit	—N/a	—N/a	—N/a	—N/a		Grasset (11)
1987	Tahar Ben Jelloun	La nuit sacrée	The Sacred Night	1989	La Nuit sacrée	1993		Seuil (4)
1988	Érik Orsenna	L'Exposition coloniale	Love and Empire	1991	—N/a	—N/a		Seuil (5)
1989	Jean Vautrin	Un grand pas vers le Bon Dieu	—N/a	—N/a	—N/a	—N/a		Grasset (12)
1990	Jean Rouaud	Les Champs d'honneur	Fields of Glory	1992	—N/a	—N/a		Minuit (2)
1991	Pierre Combescot	Les Filles du Calvaire	—N/a	—N/a	—N/a	—N/a		Grasset (13)
1992	Patrick Chamoiseau	Texaco	Texaco	1998	—N/a	—N/a		Gallimard (30)
1993	Amin Maalouf	Le Rocher de Tanios	The Rock of Tanios	1994	—N/a	—N/a		Grasset (14)
1994	Didier Van Cauwelaert	Un Aller simple	One-Way	2003	One Way Ticket	2001		Albin Michel (9)
1995	Andreï Makine	Le Testament français	Dreams of My Russian Summers	1998	—N/a	—N/a		Mercure de France (4)
1996	Pascale Roze	Le Chasseur Zéro	—N/a	—N/a	—N/a	—N/a		Albin Michel (10)
1997	Patrick Rambaud	La Bataille	The Battle	2000	—N/a	—N/a		Grasset (15)
1998	Paule Constant	Confidence pour confidence	Trading Secrets	2001	—N/a	—N/a		Gallimard (31)
1999	Jean Echenoz	Je m'en vais	I'm Gone (US) or I'm Off (UK)	2001	—N/a	—N/a		Minuit (3)
2000	Jean-Jacques Schuhl	Ingrid Caven	Ingrid Caven	2004	—N/a	—N/a		Gallimard (32)
2001	Jean-Christophe Rufin	Rouge Brésil	Brazil Red	2004	—N/a	—N/a		Gallimard (33)
2002	Pascal Quignard	Les Ombres errantes	The Roving Shadows	2011	—N/a	—N/a		Grasset (16)
2003	Jacques-Pierre Amette	La maîtresse de Brecht	Brecht's Lover (US) or Brecht's Mistress (UK)	2005	—N/a	—N/a		Albin Michel (11)
2004	Laurent Gaudé	Le Soleil des Scorta	The House of Scorta (US 2006) The Scortas' Sun (UK 2007)	2006	—N/a	—N/a		Actes Sud
2005	François Weyergans	Trois jours chez ma mère	—N/a	—N/a	—N/a	—N/a		Grasset (17)
2006	Jonathan Littell	Les Bienveillantes	The Kindly Ones	2009	—N/a	—N/a		Gallimard (34)
2007	Gilles Leroy	Alabama Song	—N/a	—N/a	—N/a	—N/a		Mercure de France (5)
2008	Atiq Rahimi	Syngué Sabour: La pierre de patience	Stone of Patience (UK) or The Patience Stone (US)	2010	The Patience Stone	2012		P.O.L
2009	Marie NDiaye	Trois femmes puissantes	Three Strong Women	2012	—N/a	—N/a		Gallimard (35)
2010	Michel Houellebecq	La Carte et le territoire	The Map and the Territory	2012	—N/a	—N/a		Flammarion (4)
2011	Alexis Jenni	L'Art français de la guerre	The French Art of War	2017	—N/a	—N/a		Gallimard (36)
2012	Jérôme Ferrari	Le Sermon sur la chute de Rome	The Sermon on the Fall of Rome	2014	—N/a	—N/a		Actes Sud (2)
2013	Pierre Lemaitre	Au revoir là-haut	The Great Swindle	2015	See You Up There	2017		Albin Michel (12)
2014	Lydie Salvayre	Pas pleurer	Cry, Mother Spain	2016	—N/a	—N/a		Seuil (6)
2015	Mathias Énard	Boussole	Compass	2017	—N/a	—N/a		Actes Sud (3)
2016	Leïla Slimani	Chanson douce	Lullaby (UK); The Perfect Nanny (USA)	2018	Perfect Nanny	2019		Gallimard (37)
2017	Éric Vuillard	L'Ordre du jour	The Order of the Day	2018	—N/a	—N/a		Actes Sud (4)
2018	Nicolas Mathieu	Leurs enfants après eux	And Their Children After Them	2019	And Their Children After Them	2024		Actes Sud (5)
2019	Jean-Paul Dubois	Tous les hommes n'habitent pas le monde de la même façon	Not Everybody Lives the Same Way	2022	—N/a	—N/a		L'Olivier
2020	Hervé Le Tellier	L'Anomalie	The Anomaly	2021	—N/a	—N/a		Gallimard (38)
2021	Mohamed Mbougar Sarr	La plus secrète mémoire des hommes	The Most Secret Memory of Men	2023	—N/a	—N/a	(Note: First winner of the Goncourt from Sub-Saharan Africa)	Philippe Rey / Jimsaan
2022	Brigitte Giraud	Vivre Vite	Live Fast	2025	—N/a	—N/a		Flammarion (5)
2023	Jean-Baptiste Andrea	Veiller sur elle	Watching Over Her	2025	—N/a	—N/a		L'Iconoclaste (1)
2024	Kamel Daoud	Houris	—N/a	—N/a	—N/a	—N/a		Gallimard (39)
2025	Laurent Mauvignier	La Maison vide	—N/a	—N/a	—N/a	—N/a		Minuit (4)
2026	Philippe Jaenada	L'Inconnue du quai de Javel	—N/a	—N/a	—N/a	—N/a	(Note: Philippe Jaenada wins Prix Goncourt for 'L'Inconnue du quai de Javel')	Flammarion (6)

== Other awards ==
In addition to the Prix Goncourt for a novel, the academy awards four other awards, for first novel, short story, biography and poetry.

As of March 2009, the académie changed the award name by dropping "bourses" ("scholarship") from the title. The prefix "prix" can be included or not, such as "Prix Goncourt de la Poésie" (Goncourt prize for Poetry) or "Goncourt de la Poésie" (Goncourt of Poetry). For example: "Claude Vigée was awarded a Goncourt de la Poésie in 2008". Or, "Claude Vigée won the 2008 prix Goncourt de la Poésie".

The award titles are:

Pre-2009 award name	Post-2009 award name	Category
Bourse Goncourt de la Biographie	Prix Goncourt de la Biographie	Biography
Bourse Goncourt de la Nouvelle	Prix Goncourt de la Nouvelle	Short story
Bourse Goncourt du Premier Roman	Prix Goncourt du Premier Roman	Debut novel
Bourse Goncourt de la Poésie	Prix Goncourt de la Poésie	Poetry
Bourse Goncourt Jeunesse	discontinued	Juvenile

The winners are listed below.

=== Prix Goncourt de la Biographie ===
Goncourt Prize for biography. Awarded in partnership with the city of Nancy. The prize was renamed officially in 2017 the Prix Goncourt de la Biographie Edmonde Charles-Roux, after a former president of the Goncourt Academy.

- 1980 – Jean Lacouture, François Mauriac
- 1981 – Hubert Juin, Victor Hugo
- 1982 – Pierre Sipriot, René Depestre
- 1983 – Ghislain de Diesbach, Madame de Staël
- 1984 – Jeanne Champion, Suzanne Valadon
- 1985 – Georges Poisson, Laclos ou l'Obstination
- 1986 – Jean Canavaggio, Cervantes
- 1987 – Michel Surya, Georges Bataille, la mort à l'œuvre
- 1988 – Frédéric Vitoux, La Vie de Louis-Ferdinand Céline
- 1989 – Joanna Richardson, Judith Gautier
- 1990 – Pierre Citron, Giono
- 1991 – Odette Joyeux, Le Troisième œil, la vie de Nicéphore Niepce
- 1992 – Philippe Beaussant, Lully
- 1993 – Jean Bothorel, Louise de Vilmorin
- 1994 – David Bellos, Georges Perec
- 1995 – Henry Gidel, Les Deux Guitry
- 1996 – Anka Muhlstein, Astolphe de Custine
- 1997 – Jean-Claude Lamy, Prévert, les frères
- 1998 – Christian Liger, Le Roman de Rossel
- 1999 – Claude Pichois and Alain Brunet, Colette
- 2000 – Dominique Bona, Berthe Morisot
- 2001 – Laure Murat, La maison du docteur Blanche
- 2002 – Jean-Paul Goujon, Une Vie Secrète (1870–1925); Mille lettres de Pierre Louÿs à Georges Louis (1890–1917)
- 2003 – Pierre Billard, Louis Malle
- 2004 – Claude Dufresne, Appelez-moi George Sand
- 2005 – Thibaut d'Anthonay, Jean Lorrain
- 2006 – Angie David, Dominique Aury
- 2007 – Patrice Locmant, Huysmans, le forçat de la vie
- 2008 – Jennifer Lesieur, Jack London
- 2009 – Viviane Forrester, Virginia Woolf
- 2010 – Michel Winock, Madame de Stael
- 2011 – Maurizio Serra, Malaparte, vies et légendes
- 2012 – David Haziot, Le Roman des Rouart
- 2013 – Pascal Mérigeau, Jean Renoir
- 2014 – Jean Lebrun, Notre Chanel
- 2015 – Jean-Christophe Attias, Moïse fragile
- 2016 – Philippe Forest, Aragon
- 2017 – Marianne and Claude Schopp, Dumas fils ou l'Anti-Œdipe
- 2018 – Denis Demonpion, Salinger intime
- 2019 – Frédéric Pajak, Manifeste incertain, volume 7: Emily Dickinson, Marina Tsvetaïeva, l'immense poésie
- 2021 – Pauline Dreyfous, Paul Morand
- 2022 – Jean-Pierre Langellier, Léopold Sédar Senghor
- 2023 – Claude Burgelin, Georges Perec
- 2024 – Geneviève Haroche-Bouzinac, Madame de Sévigné
- 2025 – Anca Visdei, Cioran ou le gai désespoir
- 2026 – Agnès Michaux, Huysmans vivant

=== Prix Goncourt de la Nouvelle ===
Goncourt Prize for short stories. Begun in 1974 in the form of scholarships. Awarded in partnership with the city of Strasbourg since 2001.

- 1974 – Daniel Boulanger, Fouette, cocher !
- 1975 – S. Corinna Bille, La Demoiselle sauvage
- 1976 – Antoine Blondin, Quat'saisons
- 1977 – Henri Gougaud, Départements et territoires d'outre-mort
- 1978 – Christiane Baroche, Chambres, avec vue sur le passé
- 1979 – Andrée Chedid, Le Corps et le Temps
- 1980 – Guy Lagorce, Les Héroïques
- 1981 – Annie Saumont, Quelquefois dans les cérémonies
- 1982 – René Depestre, Alléluia pour une femme-jardin
- 1983 – Raymond Jean, Un fantasme de Bella B.
- 1984 – Alain Gerber, Les Jours de vin et de roses
- 1985 – Pierrette Fleutiaux, Métamorphoses de la reine
- 1986 – Jean Vautrin, Baby-boom
- 1987 – Noëlle Châtelet, Histoires de bouche
- 1988 – Jean-Louis Hue, Dernières Nouvelles du Père Noël
- 1989 – Paul Fournel, Les Athlètes dans leur tête
- 1990 – Jacques Bens, Nouvelles désenchantées
- 1991 – Rafaël Pividal, Le Goût de la catastrophe
- 1992 – Catherine Lépront, Trois gardiennes
- 1993 – Mariette Condroyer, Un après-midi plutôt gai
- 1994 – Jean-Christophe Duchon-Doris, Les Lettres du baron
- 1996 – Ludovic Janvier, En mémoire du lit
- 1997 – François Sureau, Le Sphinx de Darwin
- 1999 – Elvire de Brissac, Les anges d'en bas
- 2000 – Catherine Paysan, Les Désarmés
- 2001 – Stéphane Denis, Elle a maigri pour le festival
- 2002 – Sébastien Lapaque, Mythologie Française
- 2003 – Philippe Claudel, Les petites mécaniques
- 2004 – Olivier Adam, Passer l'hiver
- 2005 – Georges-Olivier Châteaureynaud, Singe savant tabassé par deux clowns
- 2006 – Franz Bartelt, Le Bar des habitudes
- 2007 – Brigitte Giraud, L'Amour est très surestimé
- 2008 – Jean-Yves Masson, Ultimes vérités sur la mort du nageur
- 2009 – Sylvain Tesson, Une vie à coucher dehors
- 2010 – Éric-Emmanuel Schmitt, Concerto à la mémoire d'un ange
- 2011 – Bernard Comment, Tout passe
- 2012 – Didier Daeninckx, L'Espoir en contrebande
- 2013 – Fouad Laroui, L'Étrange Affaire du pantalon de Dassoukine
- 2014 – Nicolas Cavaillès, Vie de monsieur Leguat
- 2015 – Patrice Franceschi, Première personne du singulier
- 2016 – Marie-Hélène Lafon, Histoires
- 2017 – Raphaël Haroche, Retourner à la mer
- 2018 – Régis Jauffret, Microfictions 2018
- 2019 – Caroline Lamarche, Nous sommes à la lisière
- 2020 – Anne Serre, Au cœur d'un été tout en or
- 2021 – Shmuel T. Meyer, Et la guerre est finie...
- 2022 – Antoine Wauters, Le museé des contradictions
- 2023 – David Thomas, Partout les autres
- 2024 – Véronique Ovaldé, À nos vies imparfaites
- 2025 – Gaël Octavia, L'étrangeté de Mathilde T.
- 2026 – Alice Renard, Peaux vives

=== Prix Goncourt du Premier Roman ===
Goncourt Prize for debut novel. Awarded in partnership with the municipality of Paris.

- 1990 – Hélène de Monferrand, Les amies d'Héloïse
- 1991 – Armande Gobry-Valle, Iblis ou la défroque du serpent
- 1992 – Nita Rousseau, Les iris bleus
- 1993 – Bernard Chambaz, L'arbre de vies
- 1994 – Bernard Lamarche-Vadel, Vétérinaires
- 1995 – Florence Seyvos, Les apparitions
- 1996 – Yann Moix, Jubilations vers le ciel
- 1997 – Jean-Christophe Rufin, L'abyssin
- 1998 – Shan Sa, Porte de la paix céleste
- 1999 – Nicolas Michel, Un revenant
- 2000 – Benjamin Berton, Sauvageons
- 2001 – Salim Bachi, Le chien d'Ulysse
- 2002 – Soazig Aaron, Le non-de Klara
- 2003 – Claire Delannoy, La guerre, l'Amérique
- 2004 – Françoise Dorner, La fille du rang derrière
- 2005 – Alain Jaubert, Val Paradis
- 2006 – Hédi Kaddour, Waltenberg
- 2007 – Frédéric Brun, Perla
- 2008 – Jakuta Alikavazovic, Corps volatils
- 2009 – Jean-Baptiste Del Amo, Une éducation libertine
- 2010 – Laurent Binet, HHhH
- 2011 – Michel Rostain, Le Fils
- 2012 – François Garde, Ce qu'il advint du sauvage blanc
- 2013 – Alexandre Postel, Un homme effacé
- 2014 – Frédéric Verger, Arden
- 2015 – Kamel Daoud, The Meursault Investigation
- 2016 – Joseph Andras, De nos frères blessés. Author declined the prize.
- 2017 – Maryam Madjidi, Marx et la poupée
- 2018 – Mahir Guven, Grand frère
- 2019 – Marie Gauthier, Court vêtue
- 2020 – Maylis Besserie, Le Tiers Temps
- 2021 – Émilienne Malfatto, Que sur toi se lamente le Tigre
- 2022 – Étienne Kern, Les envolés
- 2023 – Pauline Peyrade, L'âge de détruire
- 2024 – Eve Guerra, Rapatriement
- 2025 – Simon Chevrier, Photo sur demande Stock
- 2026 – Romain Lemire Clément Le Cherche-Midi

=== Prix Goncourt de la Poésie ===
Goncourt Prize for poetry. Established through the bequest of Adrien Bertrand (Prix Goncourt in 1914). The award is for the poet's entire career work. The prize was officially renamed in 2012 the Prix Goncourt de la Poésie Robert Sabatier, after the poet.

- 1985 – Claude Roy
- 1986 – postponed to 1987
- 1987 – Yves Bonnefoy
- 1988 – Eugène Guillevic
- 1989 – Alain Bosquet
- 1990 – Charles Le Quintrec
- 1991 – Jean-Claude Renard
- 1992 – Georges-Emmanuel Clancier
- 1993 – not awarded
- 1994 – not awarded
- 1995 – Lionel Ray
- 1996 – André Velter
- 1997 – Maurice Chappaz
- 1998 – Lorand Gaspar
- 1999 – Jacques Réda
- 2000 – Liliane Wouters
- 2001 – Claude Esteban
- 2002 – Andrée Chedid
- 2003 – Philippe Jaccottet
- 2004 – Jacques Chessex
- 2005 – Charles Dobzynski
- 2006 – Alain Jouffroy
- 2007 – Marc Alyn
- 2008 – Claude Vigée
- 2009 – Abdellatif Laabi
- 2010 – Guy Goffette
- 2011 – Vénus Khoury-Ghata
- 2012 – Jean-Claude Pirotte
- 2013 – Charles Juliet
- 2014 – not awarded
- 2015 – William Cliff
- 2016 – Le Printemps des Poètes
- 2017 – Franck Venaille
- 2018 – Anise Koltz
- 2019 – Yvon Le Men
- 2020 – Michel Deguy
- 2021 – Jacques Roubaud
- 2022 – Jean-Michel Maulpoix
- 2023 – Laura Vazquez
- 2023 – Christian Bobin (special prize awarded posthumously)
- 2024 – Louis-Philippe Dalembert
- 2025 – James Sacré
- 2026 – René Depestre

=== Bourse Goncourt Jeunesse ===
Goncourt Prize for children's literature. Awarded in partnership with the municipality of Fontvieille. Discontinued after 2007.

- 1999 – Claude Guillot and Fabienne Burckel, Le fantôme de Shanghai
- 2000 – Eric Battut, Rouge Matou
- 2002 – Fred Bernard and François Roca, Jeanne and le Mokélé and Jesus Betz
- 2003 – Yvan Pommaux, Avant la Télé
- 2004 – Jean Chalon and Martine Delerm, Un arbre dans la lune
- 2005 – Natali Fortier, Lili Plume
- 2006 – Bernard du Boucheron and Nicole Claveloux, Un roi, une princesse and une pieuvre
- 2007 – Véronique Ovaldé and Joëlle Jolivet, La très petite Zébuline

=== Prix Goncourt des détenus ===
Translated as the "Inmate's Goncourt Prize", the jury are composed of prison inmates, over 500 in total participate. It is backed and promoted by the French government and is an initiative of the Centre national du livre ("National Book Center"), an official institution that supports France's book industry. The Goncourt Academy joined the project.

- 2022: Sarah Jollien-Fardel, Sa préférée.
- 2023: Mokhtar Amoudi, Les Conditions idéales.
- 2024: Sandrine Collette, Madelaine avant l’aube
- 2025: Paul Gasnier, La Collision

== See also ==
- Prix Renaudot – announced at the same ceremony as the Prix Goncourt, it has become something of a second-place prize.
- Prix Goncourt des Lycéens
- Grand Prix du roman de l'Académie française
- List of French literary awards

== Notes and references ==
Notes
