= Ingrid Caven (novel) =

2000 novel by Jean-Jacques Schuhl

- Author: Jean-Jacques Schuhl
- Language: French
- Publisher: Éditions Gallimard
- Publication date: 7 September 2000
- Publication place: France
- Pages: 214
- ISBN: 2-07-075948-2

Ingrid Caven is a 2000 novel by the French writer Jean-Jacques Schuhl. It received the Prix Goncourt.

== See also ==
- 2000 in literature
- Contemporary French literature
- Ingrid Caven
