= Thierry Sandre =

French writer and poet

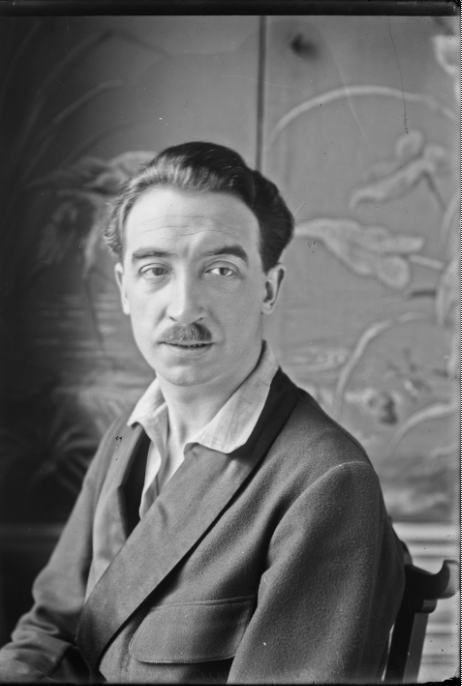
Sandre in 1924

Thierry Sandre (born Charles Moulié; 9 May 1891 in Bayonne – 11 October 1950) was a French writer, poet, and essayist. He won the Prix Goncourt in 1924 for Le Chèvrefeuille.

Thierry Sandre was a specialist in French literature of the sixteenth century, also known under the pseudonym Jean Dumoulin. He was also the translator or adapter of Greek, Latin, or Arabic. He was the secretary to Pierre Louÿs before World War I. He spent much of the war in captivity in Germany. In 1919, he was a founding member of the Association of War Writers. From October 1921, he participated actively, in the publication of an anthology of dead war writers in five volumes. In 1936, he became a member of the Third Order of Saint Dominic, the Dominicans in Paris. He resumed service in 1940, and was again taken prisoner, but released in 1941.

He became a follower of the Ordre Nouveau (1940s), and because the two books he published in 1942, and 1943 he was included on the list of banned writers after the war, He managed to rehabilitate himself, and published several more books.

== Works ==
- Les mignardises (1909) with the pseudonyme Charles Moulié
- En sourdine (1910) with the pseudonyme Charles Moulié
- Le Tombeau de Renée Vivien (1910)
- Les poésies de Makoko Kangourou (1910) (with Marcel Ormoy)
- Le pourpre et le crêpe (1917) with the pseudonyme Jean Dumoulin
- Le Fer et la flamme (1919)
- Apologie pour les nouveaux riches' (1920)
- Fleurs du désert (1921)
- Apologie pour les nouveaux riches (1921)
- Les Épigrammes de Rufin (1922)
- Le livre des baiser's (1922)
- Sulpicia, Tablettes d'une amoureuse (1922)
- Joachim du Bellay, les amours de Faustine (1923)
- Mienne E. Malfère, 1923
- Le Chèvrefeuille (1924) (Prix Goncourt 1924)
- Panouille Gallimard, 1926
- Mousseline J. Ferenczi, 1926
- Le chapitre treize d’Athénée (1924)
- La touchante aventure de Héro et Léandre (1924)
- L'Histoire merveilleuse de Robert le Diable (1925)
- Ruffi, les épigrammes d'amour (1925)
- Le Purgatoire E. Malfer̀e, 1924
- Cocagne Librairie de France, (1926 et 1927)
- Le visage de la France : Gascogne, Guyenne, Côte d’Argent, Pyrénées, Béarn, Côte Basque (1927) (with Pierre Benoit).
- Les Yeux fermés (1928)
- Monsieur Jules (1932)
- Le corsaire Pellot qui courut pour le roi, pour la république et pour l'empereur et qui était Basque (1932)
- Le chèvrefeuille, Gallimard, 1924
- Monsieur Jules: roman A. Michel, 1932
- La chartreuse de Bosserville (1941)
- Crux, récit scénique de la Passion (1941)
- I.N.R.I., la vie de Notre Seigneur Jésus Christ (1942)
- Calendrier du désastre d'après les documents allemands (1942)
- Lettre sans humour à sa Majesté la reine d'Angleterre (1943)
- Les Amours de Faustine; Posies Latines Traduites Pour La Premiere Fois Et Publies. BiblioBazaar, LLC. 2009. ISBN 978-1-115-04551-3.
