= Francis Walder =

Belgian writer and soldier (1906–1997)

Francis Walder, born Francis Waldburger (5 August 1906 – 10 April 1997) was a Belgian writer and soldier. He was born in Brussels and died in Paris at the age of 90.

== Life ==
He studied at the Royal Military Academy in Belgium. During the World War II, he was a prisoner of war in Germany for five years. And he was a representative of the Belgian army that participated in diplomatic discussions after the Armistice. This experience will serve as a crucible for his work to come. During his military career, he published only a few philosophical texts, ("Deep existence", "Seasons of the mind"), before devoting himself to writing after reaching retirement.

In 1958 he received the Prix Goncourt for Saint-Germain ou la négociation (Gallimard), an historical novel that recounts the negotiations between the crown of France and the Huguenots in 1570, negotiations leading to the fragile Peace of Saint-Germain-en-Laye. This book deals with great subtlety with the entire diplomatic negotiations among the powerful. He continued with the historical novel in two other novels: "A Letter for Hire" (Gallimard, 1962) whose work is in the seventeenth century and revived the courtier and poet Vincent Voiture and "Chaillot or co-existence" (Belfond, 1987) that shows the co-habitation policy of Louis XIII and Cardinal Richelieu in counterpoint to the co-existence of Cardinal and Gaston, Duke of Orléans, brother of the King. His novels, meticulous style, often tinged with pessimism and are haunted by the specter of the impossible love between persons of different origin or social status.

== Works ==
- L'existence profonde (essays) 1953
- Les saisons de l'esprit (essays) Aubier, 1955
- Saint-Germain ou la négociation Gallimard, 1958
- Cendre et or, Gallimard, 1959
- Une lettre de Voiture, Gallimard, 1962
- Chaillot ou la coexistence P. Belfond, 1987, ISBN 9782714420923
- Le hasard est un grand artiste P. Belfond, 1991, ISBN 978-2-7144-2633-8

=== English Translations ===
- The negotiators, McDowell, Obolensky, 1959
