= Henri Troyat =

Russian-French author (1911–2007)

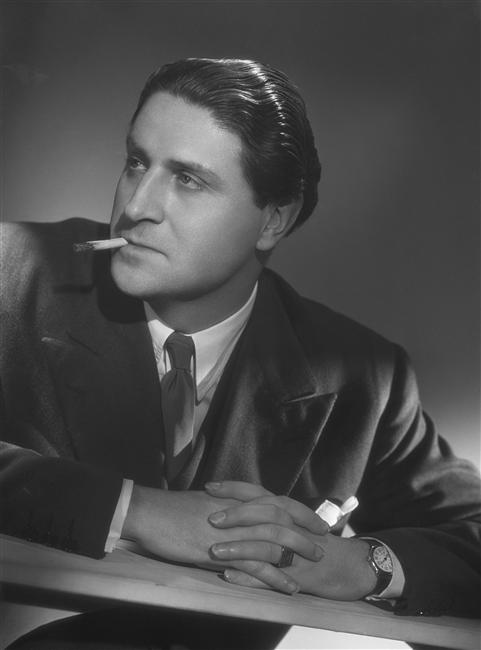
- Troyat in 1943
- Born: Lev Aslanovich Tarasov; 1 November 1911; Moscow, Russia
- Died: 2 March 2007 (aged 95); Paris, France
- Resting place: Montparnasse Cemetery
- Education: Lycée Pasteur
- Occupations: Novelist; biographer; historian
- Writing career
- Language: French
- Period: 1935–2010
- Notable awards: Prix Goncourt (1938)

Henri Troyat, born Lev Aslanovich Tarasov (French: [ɑ̃ʁi tʁwaja]; 1 November [O.S. 19 October] 1911 – 2 March 2007), was a Russian-French writer, biographer, historian, and novelist.

== Early life ==
Lev Aslanovich Tarasov (Russian: Лев Асланович Тарасов, Lev Aslanovich Tarasov) was born in Moscow to parents of Armenian heritage. In his autobiography, he states that his surname is Armenian (Torossian). His family fled Russia after the outbreak of the revolution. After a long exodus taking them to the Caucasus on to Crimea and later by sea to Istanbul and then Venice, the family finally settled in Paris in 1920, where young Troyat was schooled and later earned a law degree. The stirring and tragic events of this flight across half of Europe are vividly recounted by Troyat in Tant que la terre durera (While the earth lasts).

== Career ==
Troyat received his first literary award, Le prix du roman populaire, at the age of twenty-four, and by twenty-seven, he was awarded the Prix Goncourt. He published more than 100 books, novels and biographies, among them those of Anton Chekhov, Catherine the Great, Rasputin, Fyodor Dostoyevsky, Ivan the Terrible and Leo Tolstoy. Troyat's best-known work is La neige en deuil (The snow in mourning), which was adapted as an English-language film in 1956 under the title The Mountain.

Troyat was elected as a member of the Académie Française in 1959. At the time of his death, he was the longest-serving member.

== Personal life and death ==
Troyat's first marriage produced a son before ending in divorce. He later married a widow with a young daughter whom he raised as his own. He died on 2 March 2007 in Paris.

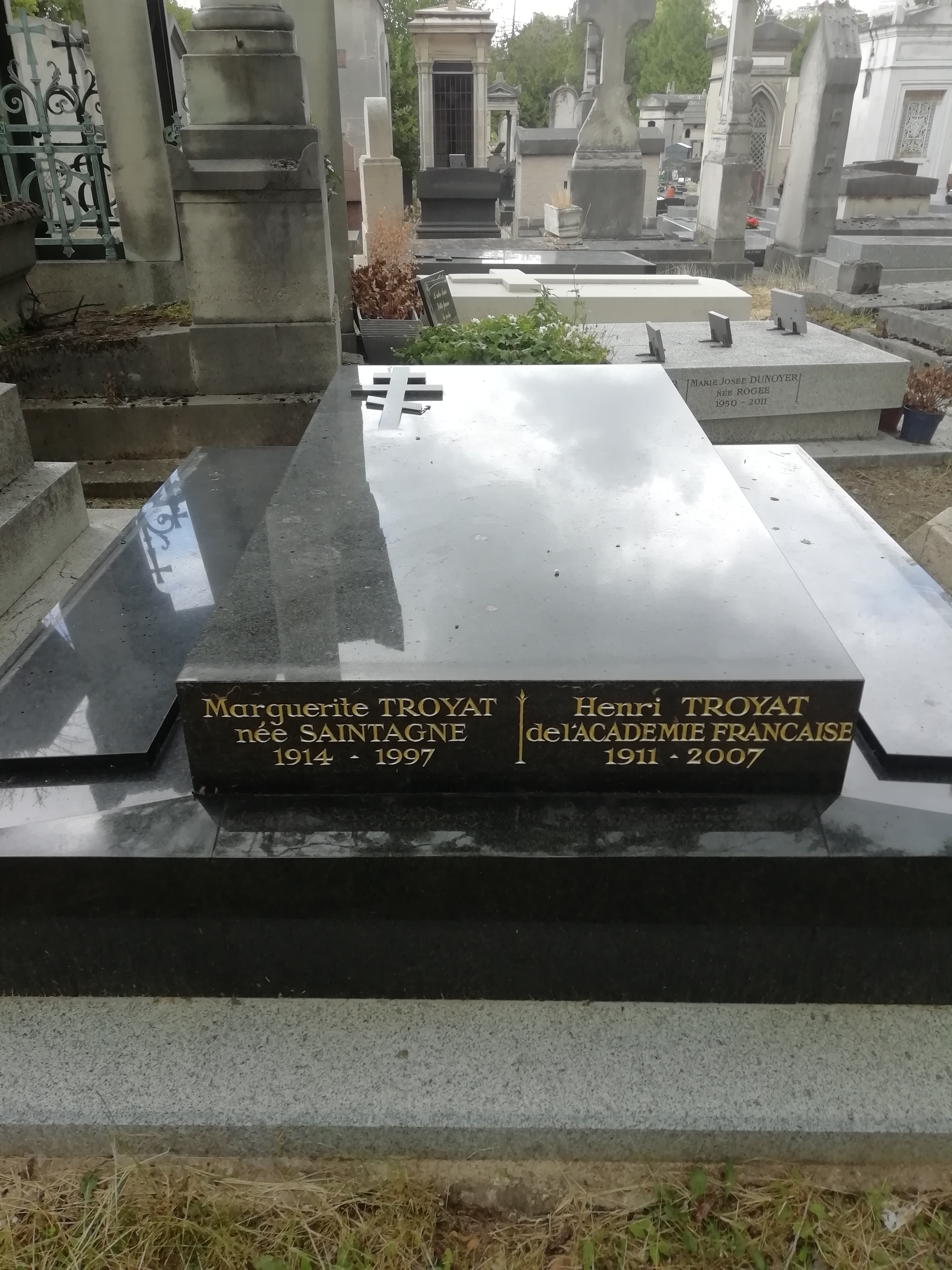
Henri Troyat's resting place in Montparnasse Cemetery, Paris

== Bibliography ==
=== Fiction ===
- 1935: Faux Jour (Plon)
- 1935: Le Vivier (Plon)
- 1936: Grandeur nature (Plon)
- 1937: La Clef de voûte (Plon)
- 1938: L’Araigne (Plon); UK trans. The Web (1984)
- 1939: La Fosse commune (Plon)
- 1941: Le Jugement de Dieu (Plon)
- 1942: Le mort saisit le vif (Plon)
- 1945: Du Philanthrope à la Rouquine (Flammarion)
- 1945: Le Signe du taureau (Plon)
- 1946: Les Ponts de Paris (Flammarion)
- 1946: Les Vivants, pièce en trois actes (Bonne)
- 1947: Tant que la terre durera, tome I (La Table ronde); US trans. The Red and the White (1956)
- 1948: Le Sac et la Cendre, Tant que la terre durera, tome II (La Table ronde); UK trans. Sackcloth and Ashes (1956)
- 1948: La Case de l'oncle Sam (La Table ronde)
- 1949: Sébastien, pièce en trois actes (Opéra)
- 1950: Étrangers sur la terre, Tant que la terre durera, tome III (La Table ronde); UK trans. Strangers in the Land (1958)
- 1951: La Tête sur les épaules (Plon); UK trans. Head in the Clouds (1979)
- 1952: La Neige en deuil (Flammarion); UK trans. The Mountain (1953)
- 1952: L’Étrange Destin de Lermontov (Plon)
- 1953: Les Semailles et les Moissons, tome I (Plon); US trans. Amelie in Love (1956)
- 1955: De Gratte-ciel en cocotier (Plon)
- 1955: Amélie, Les Semailles et les Moissons, tome II (Plon); US trans. Amelie and Pierre (1957)
- 1956: La Maison des bêtes heureuses (Bias)
- 1956: La Grive, Les Semailles et les Moissons, tome III (Plon); US trans. Elizabeth (1959)
- 1957: Tendre et violente Elisabeth, Les Semailles et les Moissons, tome IV (Plon); US trans. Tender and Violent Elizabeth (1960)
- 1958: La Rencontre, Les Semailles et les Moissons, tome V (Plon); US trans. The Encounter (1962)
- 1958: Naissance d'une Dauphine (Gallimard)
- 1959: La Lumière des justes, tome I : Les Compagnons du Coquelicot. (Flammarion); UK trans. The Brotherhood of the Red Poppy (1962)
- 1960: La Lumière des justes, tome II : La Barynia. (Flammarion); US trans. The Baroness (1961)
- 1961: La Lumière des justes, tome III : La Gloire des vaincus. (Flammarion)
- 1962: La Lumière des justes, tome IV : Les Dames de Sibérie. (Flammarion)
- 1963: La Lumière des justes, tome V : Sophie ou la Fin des combats. (Flammarion)
- 1963: Une extrême amitié (La Table ronde); UK trans. An Intimate Friendship (1967)
- 1964: Le Geste d'Ève (Flammarion)
- 1965: Les Eygletière, tome I (Flammarion)
- 1966: La Faim des lionceaux, Les Eygletière, tome II (Flammarion)
- 1967: La Malandre, Les Eygletière, tome III (Flammarion)
- 1968: Les Héritiers de l'avenir, tome I : Le Cahier. (Flammarion)
- 1969: Les Héritiers de l'avenir, tome II : Cent un coups de canon. (Flammarion)
- 1970: Les Héritiers de l'avenir, tome III : L’Éléphant blanc. (Flammarion)
- 1972: La Pierre, la Feuille et les Ciseaux (Flammarion)
- 1973: Anne Prédaille (Flammarion)
- 1974: Le Moscovite, tome I (Flammarion)
- 1974: Les Désordres secrets, Le Moscovite, tome II (Flammarion)
- 1975: Les Feux du matin, Le Moscovite, tome III (Flammarion)
- 1976: Un si long chemin (Stock)
- 1976: Le Front dans les nuages (Flammarion)
- 1976: Grimbosq (Flammarion)
- 1978: Le Prisonnier n° I (Flammarion)
- 1980: Viou, tome I (Flammarion); UK trans. Sylvie (1982)
- 1982: Le Pain de l'étranger (Flammarion)
- 1983: La Dérision (Flammarion)
- 1984: Marie Karpovna (Flammarion)
- 1985: Le Bruit solitaire du cœur (Flammarion)
- 1986: À demain, Sylvie, Viou, tome II (Flammarion); UK trans. Sylvie – Happiness (1989)
- 1987: Le Troisième Bonheur, Viou, tome III (Flammarion)
- 1988: Toute ma vie sera mensonge (Flammarion)
- 1989: La Gouvernante française (Flammarion)
- 1990: La Femme de David (Flammarion)
- 1991: Aliocha (Flammarion)
- 1992: Youri (Flammarion)
- 1993: Le Chant des Insensés (Flammarion)
- 1994: Le Marchand de masques (Flammarion)
- 1995: Le Défi d'Olga (Flammarion)
- 1996: Votre très humble et très obéissant serviteur (Flammarion)
- 1997: L’Affaire Crémonnière (Flammarion)
- 1998: Le Fils du satrape (Grasset)
- 1998: Terribles tsarines (Grasset)
- 1999: Les turbulences d'une grande famille (Grasset)
- 1999: Namouna ou la chaleur animale (Grasset)
- 2000: La Ballerine de Saint-Pétersbourg (Plon)
- 2001: La Fille de l'écrivain (Grasset)
- 2002: L'Étage des bouffons (Grasset)
- 2004: La Fiancée de l'ogre (Grasset)
- 2004: La Baronne et le musicien (Grasset)
- 2006: La Traque (Grasset)
- 2009: Le Pas du juge (Bernard de Fallois)
- 2009: La folie des anges (Bernard de Fallois)
- 2010: Trois mères, trois fils (Bernard de Fallois)

=== Non-fiction ===
- 1940: Dostoïevski (Fayard); Fyodor Dostoevsky
- 1946: Pouchkine (Plon); UK trans. Pushkin: His Life and Times (1951) & new trans. Pushkin. A Biography (1974)
- 1956: Sainte Russie, souvenirs et réflexions suivi de l'Assassinat d'Alexandre II (Grasset)
- 1959: La Vie quotidienne en Russie au temps du dernier tsar (Hachette); UK trans. Daily Life in Russia Under the Last Tsar (1961)
- 1965: Tolstoï (Fayard); UK trans. Tolstoy (1968)
- 1971: Gogol (Flammarion); UK trans. Gogol: The Biography of a Divided Soul (1974)
- 1971: Kisling 1891–1953 (Jean Kisling); tomes I & II avec Joseph Kessel
- 1977: Catherine la Grande (Flammarion); UK trans. Catherine the Great (1979)
- 1979: Pierre le Grand (Flammarion); UK trans. Peter the Great (1988)
- 1981: Alexandre Ier (Flammarion); UK trans. Alexander of Russia (1984)
- 1982: Ivan le Terrible (Flammarion); UK trans. Ivan the Terrible (1985)
- 1984: Tchekhov (Flammarion); UK trans. Chekhov (1987)
- 1985: Tourgueniev (Flammarion); UK trans. Turgenev. A Biography (1989)
- 1986: Gorki (Flammarion); UK trans. Gorky. A Biography (1989)
- 1988: Flaubert (Flammarion); UK trans. Flaubert (1992)
- 1989: Maupassant (Flammarion); Guy de Maupassant
- 1990: Alexandre II, le tsar libérateur (Flammarion); Alexander II of Russia
- 1991: Nicolas II, le dernier tsar (Flammarion); Nicholas II of Russia
- 1992: Zola (Flammarion); Émile Zola
- 1993: Verlaine (Flammarion); Paul Verlaine
- 1994: Baudelaire (Flammarion); Charles Baudelaire
- 1995: Balzac (Flammarion); Honoré de Balzac
- 1996: Raspoutine (Flammarion); Rasputin trans. German and Swedish (1998), Spanish (2004)
- 1997: Juliette Drouet (Flammarion); Juliette Drouet
- 2000: Nicolas Ier (Librairie académique Perrin); Nicholas I of Russia
- 2001: Marina Tsvetaeva : L'éternelle insurgée (Grasset); Marina Tsvetaeva
- 2004: Alexandre III (Grasset); Alexander III of Russia
- 2005: Alexandre Dumas. Le cinquième mousquetaire (Grasset); Alexandre Dumas
- 2006: Pasternak (Grasset); Boris Pasternak
- 2008: Boris Godunov (Flammarion); Boris Godunov

== In popular culture ==
A fictionalised version of Henri Troyat is featured in the 2014–2015 Image Comics Millarworld comic book series MPH by Mark Millar and Duncan Fegredo as the former Chief Scientific Officer of France's superhuman development program and inventor of the titular "MPH" super-speed pill, who disappeared in 1984 and has been living in-hiding ever since (bar attending the occasional jazz festival). While Millar revealed in an interview in January 2014 that the character would return in another then-untitled title set in the Millarworld shared fictional universe the following year, which turned out to be Huck, the character would be renamed "Orlov" for this follow-up appearance.

== See also ==
- List of Russian Academy Award winners and nominees
- List of French Academy Award winners and nominees
