= Nita Rousseau =

French journalist and woman of letters (1944–2003)

Nita Rousseau (1944 – 28 July 2003, Paris) was a French journalist and woman of letters. The daughter of an officer of the troupes coloniales, Nita Rousseau grew up in Indochina and Africa. She was a documentalist at Le Nouvel Observateur, before becoming a cultural journalist and a literary and theatrical critic from 1971. Her first novel, Les Iris bleus, received the prix Goncourt du premier roman in 1992. L'Italienne and La Pluie sur la mer were devoted to the world of theater. She portrayed her father in her latest book, Un père si mystérieux.

== Works ==
- 1991: Un colossal enfant, conversations with Marcel Maréchal, Actes Sud, ISBN 2-86869-808-5
- 1992: Les Iris bleus, éditions Flammarion, ISBN 978-2080666642
- 1993: L'Italienne, éditions Flammarion, ISBN 978-2080668516
- 1998: La Pluie sur la mer, éditions Flammarion, ISBN 978-2080671325
- 2001: Un père si mystérieux, Plon, ISBN 978-2259190015
