= Batouala (novel) =

1921 novel by Guianan writer René Maran

- Title page of 1921 edition
- Author: René Maran
- Language: French
- Published: 1921
- Publisher: Albin Michel
- Publication place: France

Batouala is a 1921 novel by French writer René Maran, which follows an African chieftain named Batouala over a few days of his life. The novel won the Prix Goncourt, one of France's highest literary awards, making Maran the first black author to win that honor.

== Summary ==
Batouala was written by René Maran, French Guyanese poet, in 1921. It centers on the life of the chieftain Batouala, and his attempts to stop a younger man from courting one of his nine wives. It is a series of sketches that show the life of the Bandas including food and celebrations and describes how they live in a continuous cycle with nature, as the white man tries to take control over nature. Every year the rainy season comes with death and destruction, and this is considered a part of life to the tribes. Batouala also speaks about the French forcing the Bandas into slavery on their railroads and in their rubber plantations, which causes the tribe to live in poverty and disease as they do not have proper time to tend to their crops.

== Impact ==
Batouala earned Maran the Prix Goncourt, making him the first black author to earn this prestigious honour. The preface of the novel contains critiques of French colonial abuses, and due to this it was banned from French colonies in 1928. Despite the racial themes in the novel, Maran said it was not written to show a battle between black and white, but instead, it was written to tell the story of two men fighting over a woman.

== Setting ==
Batouala is set in the Grimari village in the southern part of French Equatorial Africa's Ubangi-Shari colony, now the Central African Republic. Every action in the book is within thirty miles of the village. In Grimari there are many hill, grass lands, and jungles, and game for hunting and panthers live outside the edges of the village.

== Characters ==
- Batouala (bah-TEW-ah-la) – Chieftain of many African tribes, exhibits many traits of violence, jealousy, and vengeance. Ultimately, he dies due to a panther attack.
- Bissibingui (bee-see-BEEN-gwee) – A young man in Batouala's village who has received affection from eight of Batouala's wives and is attempting to earn the affection of the ninth. He is Batouala's main rival.
- Yassiguindja (yah-see-GWEE-njah) – Batouala's favorite wife who remains childless.
- Indouvoura (ihn-dew-VEW-rah) – One of Batouala's nine wives.
