= Jacques-Pierre Amette =

French writer (born 1943)

- Born: 18 May 1943 (age 83); Saint-Pierre-en-Auge
- Other names: Paul Clément, Paul Edel
- Education: University of Caen Normandy
- Occupation: Writer
- Awards: Prix Goncourt 2003
- Website: http://amette.free.fr/

Jacques-Pierre Amette (born 1943 in Saint-Pierre-sur-Dives, Calvados, German-occupied France) is a French writer. In 2003 his novel Brecht's Mistress (French: La Maîtresse de Brecht) won the Prix Goncourt. He has been a correspondent for The New York Times and a journalist for several French newspapers.

== Bibliography ==
=== novels ===
- 1965: Le Congé
- 1966: Élisabeth Skerla
- 1974: La Vie comme ça
- 1977: Bermuda
- 1978: La Nuit tombante
- 1981: Jeunesse dans une ville normande
- 1985: Enquête d'hiver
- 1987: L'Après-midi
- 1992: La Peau du monde
- 1995: Province
- 1997: Les Deux Léopards (Prix Contrepoint 1997)
- 1999: L'Homme du silence
- 2001: Ma vie, son œuvre
- 2003: Brecht's Mistress (2005 UK) / Brecht's Lover (2005 US) / La Maîtresse de Brecht (2003 FR)
- 2009: Journal météorologique

=== Romans noirs ===
- Exit, Éditions Gallimard, (Série noire) n°1850 (1981) ISBN 2-07-048850-0, reprint Gallimard, series Folio n°3010 (1997) ISBN 2-07-040347-5 under the pseudonym Paul Clément
- Je tue à la campagne, Gallimard, Série noire n°1896 (1982) ISBN 2-07-048896-9, reprint Gallimard, series Folio policier n°230 (2001) ISBN 2-07-041939-8 under the pseudonym Paul Clément
- Le Lac d'or, Albin Michel (2007) ISBN 978-2-226-18200-5, reprint LGE, Le Livre de Poche n°3219 (2010) ISBN 978-2-253-13427-5

=== Tales ===
- 1970: Un voyage en province
- 1986: Confessions d'un enfant gâté (Prix Roger Nimier 1986)
- 1991: Le Voyage d'Hölderlin en France
- 1993: L'adieu à la raison
- 1994: Stendhal : 3 juin 1819
- 2007: Un été chez Voltaire
- 2012: Liaison romaine

=== Short stories ===
- 1973: Les lumières de l'Antarctique

=== Theatre ===
- 1974: Les Sables mouvants
- 1989: Le Maître-nageur
- 1989: Les Environs de Heilbronn
- 1991: Après nous
- 1991: La Waldstein
- 1992: Le Mal du pays
- 1992: Singe
- 1992: Passions secrètes, crimes d'avril
- 1993: Appassionata
- 1997: La Clairière
- 2005: Le Tableau de Poussin

=== Honours ===
- 1986: Prix Roger-Nimier for Confessions d'un enfant gâté
- 1997: Prix Contrepoint for Les Deux Léopards
- 1992: Prix CIC du Théâtre for Passions secrètes, crimes d'avril
- 2003: Prix Goncourt for La Maîtresse de Brecht (édition dite « du Centenaire »)
- 2007: Prix Prince-Pierre-de-Monaco
