= Léon Frapié =

French novelist

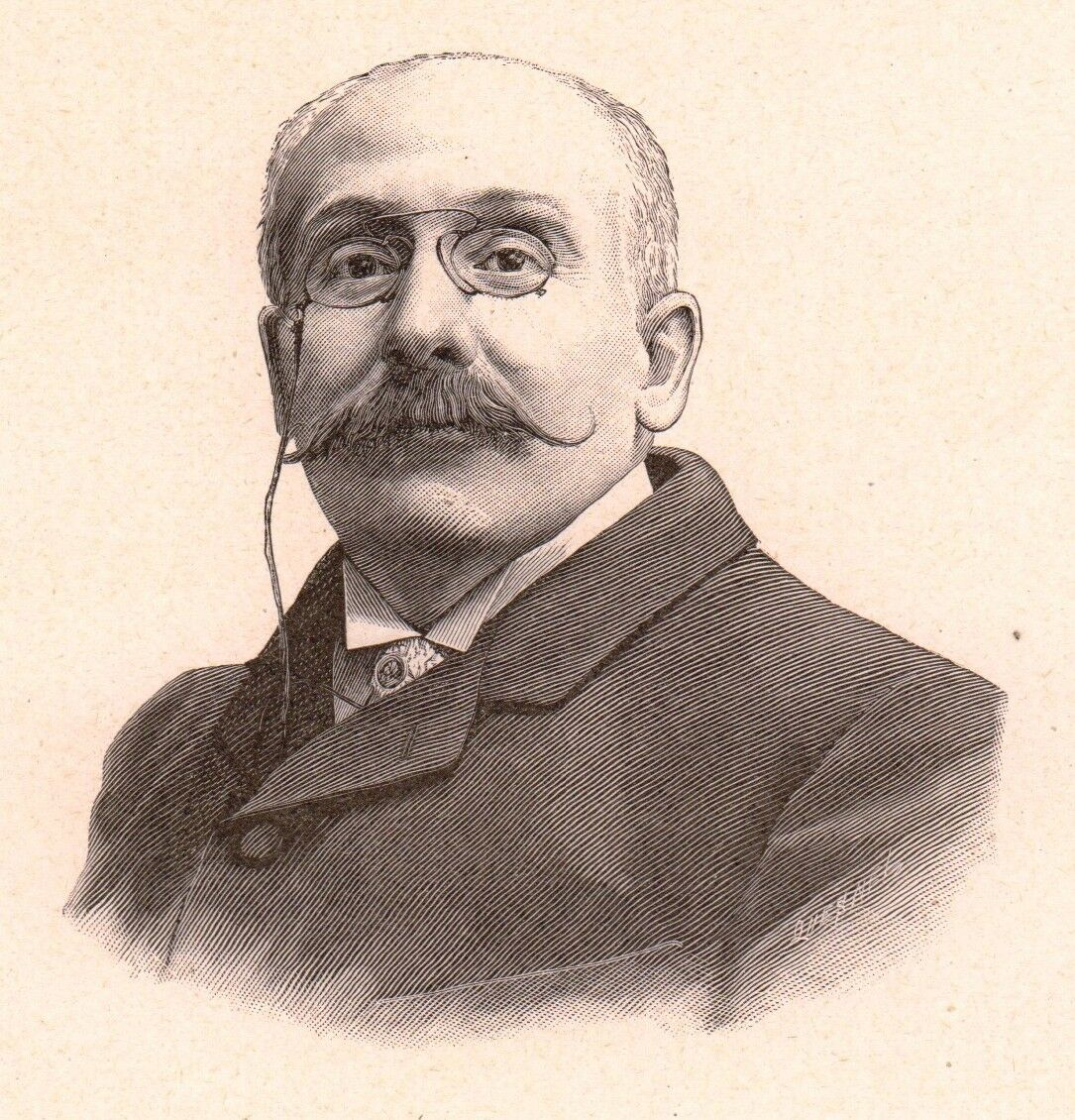
Léon Frapié

Léon Eugène Frapié (27 January 1863 in Paris – 29 September 1949 in Paris) was a French novelist.

He first contributed to magazines and newspapers, then a few novels. He is most known for the 1904 Prix Goncourt winning novel La Maternelle. It is a moving picture of disillusioned manners of children in poor neighborhood schools. It was successfully adapted to film in 1933 as La Maternelle and in 1935 was ranked among the best foreign language films by the National Board of Review of Motion Pictures. In general, his work is connected with the tradition of the realistic novel.

== Works ==
- L’Institutrice de province (1897)
- Marcelin Gayard (1902)
- La Maternelle (prix Goncourt 1904; film La Maternelle 1933)
- Les Obsédés (1904)
- L’Écolière (1905), recueil de contes
- La Boîte aux Gosses (1907)
- La Figurante (1908)
- Les Contes de la maternelle (1910)
- Les Contes de la guerre (1915)
- Les Bonnes Gens (1918)
- Nouveaux Contes de la maternelle (1919)
- Les Amies de Juliette (1922)
- Les Filles à marier (1923)
- La Divinisée (1927)
- Gamins de Paris – Librairie Baudinière
- Les contes de Paris – Librairie Baudinière
