= Histoire d'un fait divers =

Histoire d'un fait divers (1946) is a novel by the French author Jean-Jacques Gautier, winning the Prix Goncourt in 1946.

The novel received the Goncourt prize, the first for the publishing house Julliard.
