= Maryam Madjidi =

French-Iranian writer (born 1980)

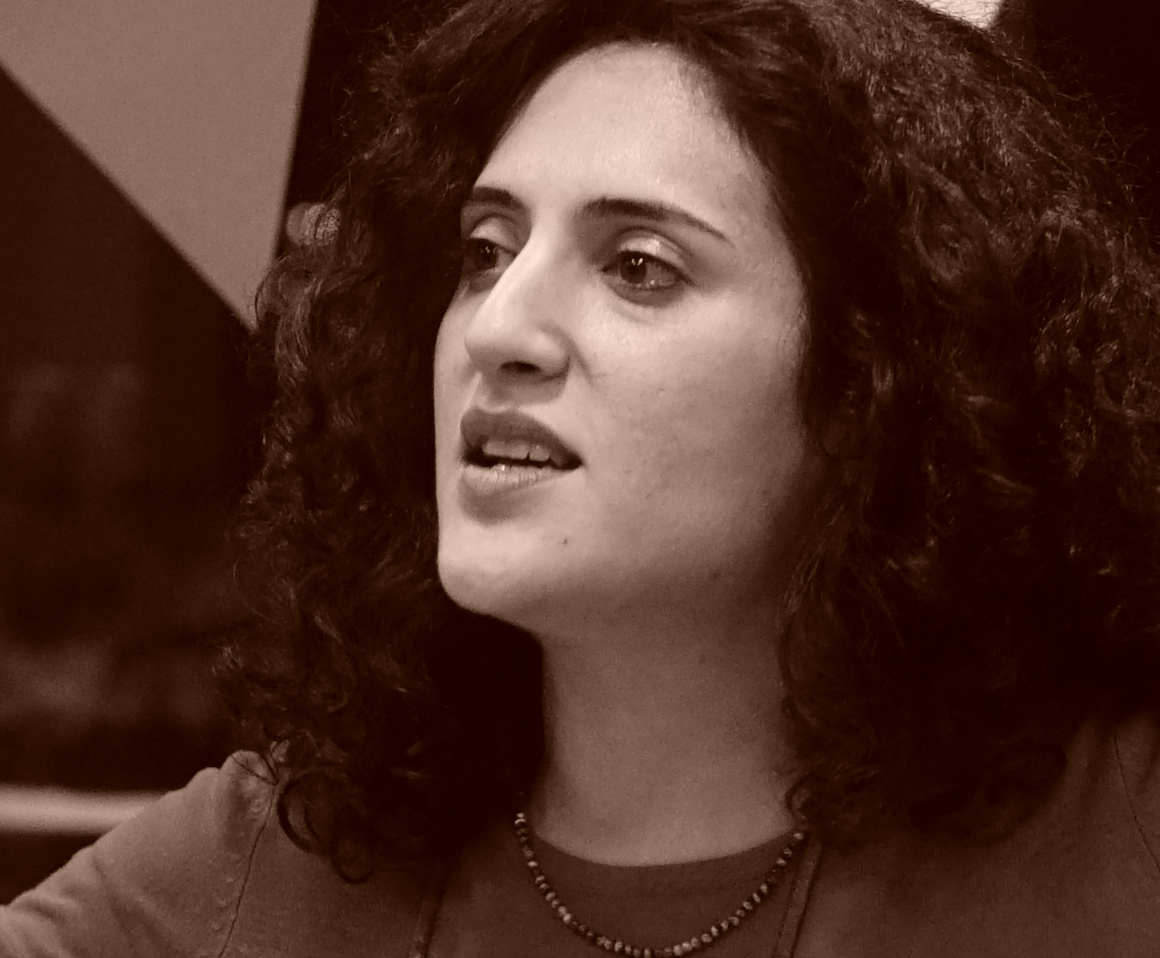
- Maryam Madjidi in 2017

Personal details
- Born: 1980 (age 45–46) Tehran, Iran

Maryam Madjidi is a French-Iranian writer. She was born in Tehran in 1980, and moved with her family to France in 1986. Her parents were communists and had been forced into exile following the Iranian revolution. She studied literature at Sorbonne University and taught French in both Beijing and Istanbul.

Her debut novel Marx et la poupée (Marx and the doll) was published in 2017 to widespread acclaim, receiving the prix Goncourt for first novel as well as the Ouest-France Etonnants Voyageurs novel prize. She is currently working on her second novel.

== Publications ==
- Madjidi, Maryam (2017). Marx et la poupée. Paris: le Nouvel Attila. ISBN 978-2-37100-043-8
- Madjidi, Maryam (2021). Pour que je m'aime encore. Paris: Le Nouvel Attila. ISBN 978-2-37100-110-7
- Madjidi, Maryam; Dubois, Claude K. (2019). Je m'appelle Maryam. Mouche. Paris: l'École des loisirs. ISBN 978-2-211-30366-8
- Madjidi, Maryam; Dubois, Claude K. (2021). Mon amie Zahra. Mouche. Paris: l'École des loisirs. ISBN 978-2-211-31234-9
