= Jean-Jacques Gautier =

French theatre critic, novelist and essayist

Jean-Jacques Gautier (4 November 1908, Essômes-sur-Marne, Aisne – 20 April 1986) was a French theatre critic, novelist and essayist. A Norman via his father (a pharmacist in Dieppe) and a champenois via his mother, he was elected a member of the Académie française in 1972.

== Works ==
- L'Oreille, 1946
- Histoire d'un fait divers, prix Goncourt, 1946
- Les Assassins d'eau douce, 1947
- Le Puits aux trois vérités, 1949
- La Demoiselle du Pont-aux-Ânes, 1950
- Paris sur scène, illustrations de Sennep, 1951
- Nativité, 1952
- M'auriez-vous condamné ? 1952
- Maria-la-Belle, 1954
- C'est tout à fait moi, 1956
- Vous aurez de mes nouvelles, 1957
- Si tu ne m'aimes je t'aime, 1960
- C'est pas d'jeu ! 1962
- Deux Fauteuils d'orchestre, 1962
- La Comédie française, 1964
- Un Homme fait, 1965
- La Chambre du fond, 1970
- Une Femme prisonnière, 1970
- Théâtre d'aujourd'hui, dix ans de critique dramatique, et des Entretiens avec Moussa Abadi sur le théâtre et la critique, illustrations de Sennep, 1972
- Cher Untel, 1974
- Je vais tout vous dire, 1976
- Âme qui vive, 1978
- Face, trois quarts, profil, 1980
- Dominique, 1981
- Une Amitié tenace, 1982
- Le Temps d'un sillage, 1985
- Mon dernier livre n'aura pas de fin, préface de Jean-Louis Curtis, 1988
- Il faut que je parle à quelqu'un, 2003
