= Natasha Lehrer =

British writer and translator

Natasha Lehrer is a British writer and literary translator. She was born in London and studied at Oxford University and the Université de Paris VIII.

Her longform essays and reviews have appeared in The Guardian, The Observer, the Times Literary Supplement, The Nation, Haaretz, Frieze Magazine and The Paris Review. She is a former literary editor of the Jewish Quarterly magazine and judge of the Jewish Quarterly-Wingate Prize.

== Awards ==
- 2016: Joint winner, with Cecile Menon, of the Scott Moncrieff Prize for their translation of Nathalie Léger's Suite for Barbara Loden.
- 2017 Shortlisted for the 2017 Albertine Prize and the 2017 French American Foundation Translation Prize for Suite for Barbara Loden by Nathalie Léger.
- 2020 Received a French Voices award for The White Dress by Nathalie Léger.
- 2020 Shortlisted for the 2020 Scott Moncrieff Prize for Memories of Low Tide by Chantal Thomas.
- 2020 Shortlisted for the Believer 2021 fiction prize for The White Dress by Nathalie Léger.
- 2021 Shortlisted for the 2021 French-American Foundation Translation Prize for The Last Days of Ellis Island by Gaëlle Josse.
- 2025 Shortlisted for the National Book Award for Translated Literature for Sad Tiger by Neige Sinno
- 2025 Winner of the National Book Critics Circle Gregg Barrios Book in Translation Prize for Sad Tiger by Neige Sinno.

== Translations ==
- 2026 - A Hymn to Life, by Gisèle Pelicot (Bodley Head)
- 2025 - After the End, by Barbara Abel (HarperVia)
- 2025 - Sad Tiger, by Neige Sinno (Seven Stories Press)
- 2025 - The Propagandist, by Cécile Despraisies (New Vessel Press / Swift Press)
- 2024 - Swimming in Paris, by Colombe Schneck, with Lauren Elkin (Penguin Press)
- 2023 - As Rich As the King, by Abigail Assor (Pushkin Press)
- 2022 – Our Unexpected Brothers, by Amin Maalouf (World Editions)
- 2022 – Absence, by Lucie Paye (Les Fugitives)
- 2022 – The Vanished Collection, by Pauline Baer de Perignon (New Vessel Press)
- 2021 – Consent, by Vanessa Springora (HarperCollins)
- 2020 – I Hate Men, by Pauline Harmange (4th Estate)
- 2020 – Villa of Delirium, by Adrien Goetz (New Vessel Press)
- 2020 – The Last Days of Ellis Island, by Gaëlle Josse (World Editions)
- 2020 – The Sailor of Casablanca, by Charline Malaval (Hodder and Stoughton)
- 2020 – The Most Beautiful Job in the World, by Giulia Mensitieri (Bloomsbury Publishing)
- 2020 – The White Dress, by Nathalie Léger (Les Fugitives / Dorothy, a publishing project)
- 2019 – Memories of Low Tide, by Chantal Thomas (Pushkin Press)
- 2019 – Chinese Spies: From Chairman Mao to Xi Jinping, by Roger Faligot (Hurst/OUP)
- 2019 – Doves Among Hawks: Struggles of the Israeli Peace Movement, by Samy Cohen (Hurst/OUP) (with Cynthia Schoch)
- 2018 – The Survival of the Jews in France, by Jacques Semelin (Hurst/OUP) (with Cynthia Schoch)
- 2018 – A Call for Revolution, by the Dalai Lama (Penguin Random House) (with Georgia de Chamberet)
- 2018 – The Sacred Conspiracy, by Georges Bataille et al (Atlas Press)
- 2017 – The Punishments of Hell, by Robert Desnos (Atlas Press)
- 2016 – Equipée: Journey to the Land of the Real, by Victor Segalen (Atlas Press)
- 2015 – Suite for Barbara Loden, by Nathalie Léger (Les Fugitives / Dorothy, a publishing project) (with Cécile Menon)

She lives in Paris with her husband and three children.
