= Gregg Barrios Book in Translation Prize =

Annual prize for translated books

- Awarded for: Best book of any genre translated into English
- Description: An annual award for the best book translated into English and published in the U.S.
- Country: United States
- Presented by: National Book Critics Circle
- First award: 2022
- Website: www.bookcritics.org/awards/gregg-barrios-book-in-translation-prize/

The Gregg Barrios Book in Translation Prize is awarded by the National Book Critics Circle. Named after the San Antonio playwright, poet and journalist Gregg Barrios (died 2021), the prize was first awarded in 2022. It is awarded annually for “the best book of any genre translated into English and published in the United States”.

== Namesake ==
Barrios was a playwright, poet and journalist. A 2013 USC Annenberg Getty Fellow, and on the board of directors of the National Book Critics Circle. He was inducted into the Texas Institute of Letters and was the 2015 fall visiting writer at Our Lady of the Lake University. His work has appeared in the Los Angeles Times, The New York Times, The Texas Observer, Texas Monthly, Film Quarterly, San Francisco Chronicle, and Andy Warhol's Interview. He was a former book editor of the San Antonio Express-News.

== Honorees ==
Gregg Barrios Book in Translation winners and longlisted books
Year	Book	Author	Original language	Translator	Result	Ref.
2022	Grey Bees	Andrey Kurkov	Russian	Boris Dralyuk	Winner	
2022	A Summer Day in the Company of Ghosts	Wang Yin	Chinese	Andrea Lingenfelter	Longlist	
2022	A Woman’s Battles and Transformations	Édouard Louis	French	Tash Aw	Longlist	
2022	Kibogo	Scholastique Mukasonga	French	Mark Polizzotti	Longlist	
2022	Linea Nigra	Jazmina Barrera	Spanish	Christina MacSweeney	Longlist	
2022	Pachinko Parlor	Elisa Shua Dusapin	French	Aneesa Abbas Higgins	Longlist	
2022	Present Tense Machine	Gunnhild Øyehaug	Norwegian	Kari Dickson	Longlist	
2022	The Books of Jacob	Olga Tokarczuk	Polish	Jennifer Croft	Longlist	
2022	Violets	Kyung-sook Shin	Korean	Anton Hur	Longlist	
2022	Walk Me to the Corner	Anneli Furmark	Swedish	Hanna Strömberg	Longlist	
2022	When I Sing Mountains Dance	Irene Solà	Catalan	Mara Faye Lethem	Longlist	
2022	You Can Be the Last Leaf	Maya Abu Al-Hayyat	Arabic	Fady Joudah	Longlist	
2023	Cold Nights of Childhood	Tezer Özlü	Turkish	Maureen Freely	Winner	
2023	The Last Pomegranate Tree	Bachtyar Ali	Kurdish	Kareem Abdulrahman	Longlist	
2023	Owlish	Dorothy Tse	Chinese	Natascha Bruce	Longlist	
2023	Phantom Pain Wings	Kim Hyesoon	Korean	Don Mee Choi	Longlist	
2023	Zakwato & Loglêdou’s Peril	Azo Vauguy	Bété, French	Todd Fredson	Longlist	
2023	Happy Stories, Mostly	Norman Erikson Pasaribu	Indonesian	Tiffany Tsao	Longlist	
2023	Indeterminate Inflorescence	Lee Seong-Bok	Korean	Anton Hur	Longlist	
2023	Our Philosopher	Gert Hofmann	German	Eric Mace-Tessler	Longlist	
2023	The End of August	Miri Yu	Japanese	Morgan Giles	Longlist	
2023	The Love of Singular Men	Victor Heringer	Portuguese	James Young	Longlist	
2023	The Naked Tree	Keum Suk Gendry-Kim	Korean	Janet Hong	Longlist	
2023	Vengeance is Mine	Marie NDiaye	French	Jordan Stump	Longlist	
2024	A Last Supper of Queer Apostles	Pedro Lemebel	Spanish	Gwendolyn Harper	Winner	
2024	The Children of the Ghetto: Star of the Sea	Elias Khoury	Arabic	Humphrey Davies	Longlist	
2024	Herscht 07769	László Krasznahorkai	Hungarian	Ottilie Mulzet	Longlist	
2024	Holy Winter 20/21	Maria Stepanova	Russian	Sasha Dugdale	Longlist	
2024	Like a Sky Inside	Jakuta Alikavazovic	French	Daniel Levin Becker	Longlist	
2024	Melvill	Rodrigo Fresán	Spanish	Will Vanderhyden	Longlist	
2024	Mourning a Breast	Xi Xi	Chinese	Jennifer Feeley	Longlist	
2024	A Muzzle for Witches	Dubravka Ugrešić	Croatian	Ellen Elias-Bursać	Longlist	
2024	O	Judith Kiros	Swedish	Kira Josefsson	Longlist	
2024	Paul Celan and the Trans-Tibetan Angel	Yoko Tawada	Arabic	Susan Bernofsky	Longlist	
2024	Traces of Enayat	Iman Mersal	Arabic	Robin Moger	Longlist	
2024	V13: Chronicle of a Trial	Emmanuel Carrère	French	John Lambert	Longlist	
2025	Sad Tiger	Neige Sinno	French	Natasha Lehrer	Winner	
2025	Exophony: Voyages Outside the Mother Tongue	Yoko Tawada	Japanese	Lisa Hofmann-Kuroda	Finalist	
2025	Heart Lamp	Banu Mushtaq	Kannada	Deepa Bhasthi	Finalist	
2025	The Frog in the Throat	Markus Werner	German	Michael Hofmann	Finalist	
2025	The Wax Child	Olga Ravn	Danish	Martin Aitken	Finalist	
2025	Near Distance	Hanna Stoltenberg	Norwegian	Wendy Gabrielsen	Finalist	
2025	Bodies Found in Various Places	Elvira Hernández	Spanish	Daniel Borzutzky	Longlist	
2025	Gaza: The Poem Said Its Piece	Nasser Rabah	Arabic	Ammiel Alcalay	Longlist	
2025	The Ruins	Ye Hui	Chinese	Dong Li	Longlist	
2025	Ugliness	Moshtari Hilal	German	Elisabeth Lauffer	Longlist	
2025	We Do Not Part	Han Kang	Korean	Paige Aniyah Morris	Longlist	
2025	Wickerwork	Christian Lehnert	German	Richard Sieburth	Longlist	
