= National Book Critics Circle Awards =

Annual American literary awards

- Awarded for: "the finest books and reviews published in English"
- Date: March, annual
- Country: United States
- Presented by: National Book Critics Circle
- First award: 1975 publications (1976)
- Website: bookcritics.org

The National Book Critics Circle Awards are a set of annual American literary awards by the National Book Critics Circle (NBCC) to promote "the finest books and reviews published in English". The first NBCC awards were announced and presented January 16, 1976. "Along with the National Book Awards and the Pulitzer Prizes, the National Book Critics Circle Awards are among the most distinguished literary prizes in the United States", according to The New York Times.

Six awards are presented annually to books published in the U.S. during the preceding calendar year, in six categories: Fiction, Nonfiction, Poetry, Memoir/Autobiography, Biography, and Criticism. Four of them span the entire NBCC award history; Memoir/Autobiography and Biography were recognized by one "Autobiography/Biography" award for publication years 1983 to 2004, then replaced by two awards. Beginning in 2014, the NBCC also presents a special "first book" award across all six categories, named the John Leonard Prize in honor of literary critic and NBCC founding member John Leonard, who died in 2008.

Books previously published in English are not eligible, such as re-issues and paperback editions. Nor does the NBC Circle consider "cookbooks, self help books (including inspirational literature), reference books, picture books or children's books". They do consider "translations, short story and essay collections, self published books, and any titles that fall under the general categories".

The judges are the volunteer directors of the NBCC who are 24 members serving rotating three-year terms, with eight elected annually by the voting members, namely "professional book review editors and book reviewers". Winners are announced each year at the NBCC awards ceremony in conjunction with the yearly membership meeting, which takes place in March.

== Award categories ==
- Biography
- Criticism
- Fiction
- General Nonfiction
- Ivan Sandrof Lifetime Achievement Award
- John Leonard Prize for Best First Book
- Memoir/Autobiography
- Nona Balakian Citation for Excellence in Reviewing
- Poetry
- Gregg Barrios Book in Translation Prize
