= Peu =

Peu or PEU may refer to:

- Peu (footballer, born 1960), Júlio dos Santos Ângelo, Brazilian footballer and manager
- Peu (footballer, born 1993), Peterson Silvino Da Cruz, Brazilian footballer
- Lawrence Peu (born 1966), a South African long-distance runner
- Stéphane Peu (born 1962), a French politician, member of the French Communist Party
- Titaua Peu (born 1975), Tahitian novelist

== See also ==
- Peu difficile, a French grade for climbing routes
