= Bérangère Bonvoisin =

French actress (1953–2026)

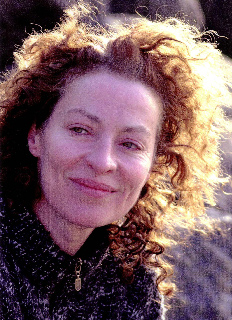
- Bonvoisin in 2003
- Born: 1953; Rabat, Morocco
- Died: August 2026 (aged 73)
- Occupations: Actress; director
- Years active: 1970–2024
- Spouse: Philippe Clévenot

Bérangère Bonvoisin (1953 – 19 August 2026) was a French actress and director.

== Life and career ==
Bérangère Bonvoisin trained as an actress at the Rouen Regional Conservatory, where she won first prize for tragedy and second prize for classical and modern comedy. In 1970, she met Alain Bézu, who directed her and his brother Bertrand in, among others, No Trifling with Love by Alfred de Musset. She played the role of Camille in the film.

In 1973, she entered the Conservatoire national supérieur d'art dramatique (National Conservatory of Dramatic Art) in Paris for three years, in the class of Antoine Vitez. It was there that in 1975, still a student, she staged Les Sincères by Marivaux, an experience which made her the first woman in the history of the Paris Conservatory to direct.

In 1984, she signed at the Bastille Theater what she considered to be her "first real production". The play Celle qui ment (The One Who Lies) was based on the writings of Angela of Foligno.

In 1987, she directed for the first time in France, with Pioneers in Ingolstadt by Marieluise Fleisser at the Théâtre des Amandiers – Nanterre. It was produced by Patrice Chéreau (the only female director during the Chéreau years at Nanterre).

On 3 February 2003, at the request of Georges Lavaudant and Jean Jourdheuil, she brought together around a hundred actors at the Odeon Theatre for a unique evening. The feature, Philippe Clévenot, Tête à Tête, was a show which combined readings and video documents in homage to the art of the actor, Philippe Clévenot, her late companion.

On 25 April 2005, she created another unique feature at the National Theatre of the Hill with Slogan for 343 Actresses by Nadia Soudaïeva and Antoine Volodine where she brought together 343 actresses, among others, Jeanne Moreau, Gisèle Casadesus, Elsa Zylberstein, Myriam Boyer, Nada Strancar, Micheline Presle, Ludmila Mikaël, Christine Boisson. etc. The filmmaker Alain Cavalier made a film of the evening, Pour Bérangère. The film remains unpublished to this day.

She was very close to the painter Gilles Aillaud, who accompanied her in a good number of productions. In 2006, a year after his death, she staged La Maladie de la mort (The Disease of Death) by Marguerite Duras. It featured Fanny Ardant at the Madeleine Theatre without any set. Bonvoisin said she was "not conceiving of calling on another scenographer". The show was later the subject of a single performance, on March 17, 2007, in the hall of the Roches Noires Hotel, in Trouville-sur-Mer where the author lived for a long time.

Bonvoisin was married to actor/comedian Philippe Clévenot until his death in 2001. She was the daughter of MP Jeanine Bonvoisin, the sister of actor Bertrand Bonvoisin, and the sister-in-law of actor Jean-Yves Dubois. Bérangère Bonvoisin died in August 2026, at the age of 73.

== Theatre ==
- 1970: You Don't Play With Love by Alfred de Musset, directed by Alain Bézu
- 1973: Miracles based on the Gospel according to John, directed by Antoine Vitez, Théâtre national de Chaillot
- 1975: Les Sincères by Marivaux, directed by B. Bonvoisin, Paris Conservatory, Avignon Festival
- 1976: Stories of telling by Jean-Pierre Thibaudat, directed by Jacques Lassalle, Théâtre Ouvert
- 1976: Fragments for a theatrical speech by Maria Koleva, with Antoine Vitez and Bertrand Bonvoisin
- 1976: Dom Juan Returns from the War by Ödön von Horváth, directed by Marcel Bluwal, Théâtre de l'Est parisien
- 1977: Marivaux 's Double Inconstance, directed by Jacques Rosner, toured in the United States
- 1977: L'Arrivante by Hélène Cixous, directed by Viviane Théophilidès and Anne-Marie Lazarini, Théâtre Ouvert, in Avignon
- 1978: The Star of Forgotten by Yvane Daoudi, directed by Bérangère Bonvoisin, Avignon Festival
- 1978: L'Adulateur by Carlo Goldoni, directed by Robert Gironès and Bernard Chatellier, Théâtre du Huitième Lyon
- 1978: And yet, this silence could not be empty by Jean Magnan, directed by Robert Gironès, Avignon Festival
- 1979: And yet, this silence could not be empty by Jean Magnan, directed by Robert Gironès, Théâtre du Huitième, Théâtre de Gennevilliers
- 1979: Eddy (Mitchell) by B. Bonvoisin, directed by Bérangère Bonvoisin, Théâtre des Quartiers d’Ivry
- 1980: Violence in Vichy by Bernard Chartreux by Michel Deutsch, directed by Jean-Pierre Vincent, National Theatre of Strasbourg, Amandiers Theatre, New Theatre of Nice
- 1980: Ruins by Michel Deutsch, directed by Jean-Pierre Vincent, National Theatre of Strasbourg, Maison de la culture de Nanterre, New Theatre of Nice
- 1982: Schliemann by Bruno Bayen, directed by Bruno Bayen, Théâtre national de Chaillot
- 1982: Hippolyte (play) by Robert Garnier, directed by Antoine Vitez, Théâtre national de Chaillot
- 1984: She Who Lies by Philippe Clévenot after Angèle de Foligno, directed by Bérangère Bonvoisin, Théâtre de la Bastille
- 1985: Conference on swimming by Michel Charolles, directed by Bérangère Bonvoisin, Théâtre Ouvert Avignon
- 1987: Carson McCullers, directed by Bérangère Bonvoisin, Théâtre Ouvert
- 1988: 'The Transfigured Salon' by Philippe Clévenot, based on Empress Sissi, directed by Bérangère Bonvoisin
- 1990: Medea by Jean Vauthier, directed by Alain Bézu
- 1991: Old Winter by Roger Planchon, directed by Roger Planchon, TNP
- 1991: Fragile forêt by Roger Planchon, directed by Roger Planchon, TNP
- 1993: The Goat by Marieluise Fleisser, directed by Bérangère Bonvoisin
- 1994: The Goat, the Virgin and the Horse, directed by B. Bonvoisin, Théâtre national de l'Odéon, Centre dramatique national d' Annecy, Chambéry
- 2000: The Silence by Elfriede Jelinek, directed by André Wilms, Théâtre Ouvert
- 2001: The Adventures of Sister Solange, directed by Bruno Boëglin (Théâtre des Célestins, Théâtre des Abbesses)
- 2001: Anna Christie by Eugene O'Neill, directed by Philippe Clévenot, Comédie de Genève, Théâtre de Villeurbanne
- 2002: Iggy Pop's Diary, directed by Laurent Vacher, Saarbrücken Festival
- 2003: Philippe Clévenot: tête à tête, performance directed by Bérangère Bonvoisin and performed by around a hundred actors, Théâtre de l'Odéon
- 2003: The Summer Monsoon by Ravenhill Mayenburg, directed by Michel Didym
- 2003: I Too Had a Shitty Childhood by Rodrigo García, directed by Claude Guerre
- 2004: Jackie by Elfriede Jelinek, directed by Michel Didym and B. Bonvoisin Pont-à-Mousson
- 2004: A strong smell of apple by Pedro Eiras, directed by Claude Guerre, Pont-à-Mousson – France Culture in public
- 2004: Blitz by Bosco Brasil, directed by Claude Guerre, Pont-à-Mousson
- 2005: Tumulte by François Bon, directed by François Bon ( Pont-à-Mousson – Reading)
- 2005: Slogans for 343 actresses by Maria Soudaïeva and Antoine Volodine, performance directed by B. Bonvoisin and performed by 343 actresses, including Jeanne Moreau, Micheline Presle, Marie-France Pisier, Nada Strancar, and Édith Scob, Théâtre national de la Colline – Show filmed by Alain Cavalier
- 2005: Sarinagara by Philippe Forest, directed by Nadine Eghels, with Aurélien Recoing
- 2005: Misterioso 119 by Koffi Kwahulé, directed by Michel Didym, Pont-à-Mousson
- 2005: The Woman Before by Roland Schimmelpfenning, directed by Jean-Pierre Vincent, Pont-à-Mousson
- 2005: The Other by Enzo Cormann, directed by Enzo Cormann, Pont-à-Mousson
- 2005–2006: A Woman of Mystery by John Cassavetes, reading staged by Marc Goldberg, Vingtième Théâtre
- 2006: The Eclipse of the August 11, by Bruno Bayen, directed by Jean-Pierre Vincent, Théâtre national de la Colline
- 2007: The Eclipse of the August 11, by Bruno Bayen, directed by Jean-Pierre Vincent, La Criée Theater, North Theater, Manufacture Theater
- 2008: Conference on Economics (Word Festival)
- 2008–2009: Little Catherine of Heilbronn by Heinrich von Kleist, directed by André Engel, Odéon-Théâtre de l'Europe Ateliers Berthier
- 2011: This is why time is running out by Philippe Clévenot, according to WC Williams at Maison de la poésie
- 2016: People of Oz by Yana Borissova, directed by Galin Stoev at the National Theatre on the Hill

=== Staged performances in the theater ===
- 1975: Les Sincères, by Marivaux (Paris Conservatory, Avignon Festival)
- 1978 : The Star of Oblivion, by Yvane Daoudi ( Avignon Festival – Open Theater)
- 1979: Eddy (Mitchell), by B. Bonvoisin (Théâtre des Quartiers d'Ivry) – production A.Vitez
- 1984: The One Who Lies, by Philippe Clévenot, based on Angèle de Foligno (Théâtre de la Bastille -Théâtre des Deux-Rives, Rouen. (With Nicolas Bonvoisin)
- 1985: Conference on swimming, by Michel Charolles (Open Theater, in Avignon)
- 1987: Pioneers in Ingolstadt, by Marieluise Fleisser (Théâtre des Amandiers) Set design:Gilles Aillaud. Production:Patrice Chéreau.
- 1987: Carson McCullers (Open Theatre)
- 1988: The Transfigured Salon, by Philippe Clévenot, based on the Empress Sissi, and texts by Cioran. Théâtre Ouvert.
- 1992: Rumor on Wall Street, by Bernard Chatellier, based on Bartleby by Herman Melville (Théâtre des Amandiers) Set design by Gilles Aillaud
- 1993: The Stranger, by Albert Camus (Beirut)
- 1993: The Goat, by Marieluise Fleisser Petit Odéon.
- 1994: The policeman is merciless, by Georges Courteline (Trouville) Decor:Gilles Aillaud.
- 1994: The Commissioner is a Good Child, by Georges Courteline (Trouville)
- 1994: The Goat, the Virgin and the Horse (Odéon Theatre, Annecy National Drama Centre, Chambéry)
- 1996, 1997, 1998 :The Conference of the Old Dovecote, by Antonin Artaud (tour) Co-directed with Philippe Clévenot.
- 1998: The Deep Sea Fish, by Marieluise Fleisser (National Drama Center of Orléans, Théâtre de la Colline. Set design by Gilles Aillaud
- 2000: Anna Christie, by O'Neill at the Comédie de Genève, co-directed with P. Clévenot. Set design by Gilles Aillaud
- 2003: Philippe Clévenot:tête à tête, performed by approximately a hundred actors, directors, and philosophers (including Isabelle Huppert, François Cluzet, André Marcon, Michèle Goddet, Jean-Pierre Vincent, Hélène Vincent, Jean-Christophe Bailly, Philippe Lacoue-Labarthe) (Théâtre de l'Odéon)
- 2004: Jackie, by Elfriede Jelinek, directed in collaboration with Michel Didym (Pont-à-Mousson)
- 2005: Slogans for 343 actresses, by Maria Soudaïeva and Antoine Volodine, performed by 343 actresses, including Jeanne Moreau, Micheline Presle, Marie-France Pisier, Nada Strancar, Édith Scob, etc. (Théâtre national de la Colline – Show filmed by Alain Cavalier)
- 2006–2007: The Malady of Death, by Marguerite Duras, with Fanny Ardant (Théâtre de la Madeleine – Tour Washington, D.C., New York, Florence, Berlin, Rome, Trouville-Les Roches Noires, Istanbul)
- 2008: What if ants were nothing without cicadas, Conference on economics with Emmanuelle Béart, based on texts by Bernard Maris (Théâtre de l'Odéon)
- 2009: Is secularism soluble in Sarkozysme?, based on an article by Gérard Desportes and the comments left in reaction on the website of the newspaper Mediapart (Théâtre de la Madeleine)
- 2011: This is why time is running out, by Philippe Clévenot, based on WC Williams, Maison de la poésie.
- 2013–2015: Big Hug by Romain Gary (Émile Ajar), at the Théâtre de L'Œuvre. Best Show in a Private Theater. Critics' Prize.

== Filmography ==
=== Movie theater ===
- 1978: The Adolescent, by Jeanne Moreau
- 1979: The Sewers of Paradise, by José Giovanni
- 1983: The Trace, by Bernard Favre (with Richard Berry)
- 1984: La Garce, by Christine Pascal (with Isabelle Huppert, Richard Berry, and Vittorio Mezzogiorno)
- 1984: Heart Side, Garden Side, by Bertrand Van Effenterre (with Julie Jézéquel, Jean-François Stévenin, and Robin Renucci)
- 1985: The Sidewalks of Saturn, by Hugo Santiago (with Philippe Clévenot)
- 1986: Paradise Hotel, by Jana Boková (with Fernando Rey and Fabrice Luchini )
- 1986: The Exploits of a Young Don Juan: The Initiation, by Gianfranco Mingozzi, after Guillaume Apollinaire (with Claudine Auger and Marina Vlady)
- 1987: Good Morning, Babylon, by the Taviani Brothers (with Vincent Spano and Greta Scacchi)
- 1988: The Reader, by Michel Deville (with Miou-Miou and Patrick Chesnais)
- 1989: Atlantic Rendez-vous, by Paule Zajdermann (with Antonio Valero and Teresa Gimpera)
- 1990: Swing Troubadour, by Bruno Bayen (with Philippe Clévenot)
- 1990: Doctor Petiot, by Christian de Chalonge (with Michel Serrault)
- 2003: Concerns by Gilles Bourdos, based on Ruth Rendell (with Grégoire Colin)
- 2006: Bad Faith, by Roschdy Zem (with Cécile de France and Roschdy Zem)
- 2006: The Untouchable, by Benoît Jacquot (with Isild Le Besco),
- 2010: Memory Lane, by Mikhaël Hers (with Didier Sandre and Lolita Chamah)

=== Television ===
- 1976: The Mysteries of Loudun by Gérard Vergez
- 1977: My memory is failing, by B. Bonvoisin (sketch in homage to Jeanne Moreau)
- 1981: Mourning in Twenty-Four Hours by Frank Cassenti (with Alain Cuny and Richard Bohringer)
- 1987: Monsieur Benjamin: the boss, by Marie-Hélène Rebois (with Georges Géret, Lucienne Hamon, and Pierre Arditi)
- 1989: The Journal of the Revolution, by Hervé Baslé (with François Marthouret and Roland Bertin )
- 1990: The Ambush, by Peter Kassovitz (with Claude Rich)
- 1992: Knocked Knees, by Hervé Baslé (with Éléonore Hirt and Jean-Pierre Bisson)
- 2002: Children of the Miracle: first period, 1979-1983 – second period: 1993-2002, by Sébastien Grall (with Sophie Broustal and Bernard Le Coq)
- 2003: A Hot Summer, by Sébastien Grall (with Charlotte de Turckheim and Anthony Delon): Sister Marie-Angéle
- 2009: The Little Murders of Agatha Christie: The ABC Murders by Eric Woreth, based on Agatha Christie (with Antoine Duléry Marius Colucci, and Denis Lavant
- 2013: Berthe Morisot by Caroline Champetier
- 2017: Remember Pierre Aknine
- 2024: An Ideal Father by Hélène Fillières

=== Realization ===
- 1977: My memory is failing (sketch in homage to Jeanne Moreau)

== Audio playback ==
- 2014: Didjla, the Tiger, novel by Jean-Pierre Faye, reissued with the full audio version read by Bérangère Bonvoisin.
