= Chinese Spies: From Chairman Mao to Xi Jinping =

Book by Roger Faligot

- Author: Roger Faligot
- Original title: Les services secrets chinois
- Translators: Natasha Lehrer (2019); Christine Donougher (1989)
- Language: French, English
- Publisher: C. Hurst & Co.
- Publication date: 1987
- Publication place: France
- English publication date: August 1, 2019 (Lehrer); 1989 (Donougher)
- ISBN: 978-1787380967

Chinese Spies: From Chairman Mao to Xi Jinping is a book by French journalist Roger Faligot which examines the history of Chinese espionage, particularly the contemporary Ministry of State Security (MSS). Originally released in French, the book has been released in many iterations since 1987 under the title Les services secrets chinois but received little critical attention until the 2019 release of an English translation of the updated 4th edition translated by Natasha Lehrer.

== Contents ==
The book provides a history of Chinese intelligence services, with an emphasis on the origins of the Chinese Communist Party (CCP) and contemporary operations of the United Front Work Department and Ministry of State Security under CCP General Secretary, which the book refers to primarily by its transliterated Chinese abbreviation, "Guoanbu." It discusses historic operations, partnerships between the Chinese and Soviet and later Russian intelligence services, the role of intelligence in large national projects like the Belt and Road Initiative, and internal drama relating to the tumultuous party politics of the CCP which oversee the MSS.

== Publication history ==
Originally released in French, Faligot has produced many iterative updates to the book since its first release in 1987 under the title Les services secrets chinois with varying subtitles and coauthors. It received little critical attention until the 2019 release of an English translation of the updated 4th edition translated by Natasha Lehrer. The 1987 edition, coauthored by Remi Kauffer, was translated into English by Christine Donougher in 1989 with a title that references Chinese spymaster Kang Sheng, as The Chinese Secret Service: Kang Sheng and the Shadow Government in Red China (ISBN 0-688-09722-7). A subsequent update was published around the time of the 2008 Beijing Summer Olympics as Les services secrets chinois: De Mao aux JO ("The Secret Service of China: from Mao to the Olympics") (ISBN 978-2847363029). In 2022 the book was rereleased in French under the title Les services secrets chinois: De Mao au Covid-19 ("The Secret Services of China: From Mao to COVID-19") (ISBN 978-2380942194.)

== Critical reception ==
- The United States Central Intelligence Agency offered harsh criticism of the book's research and its translation, writing in a 2020 issue of Studies in Intelligence that "overall, there is little in the book that is new, much that may frustrate intelligence professionals and academics familiar with the subject, and a great deal of that will mislead or misinform readers approaching the subject afresh", though it concedes that the book is "certainly much better-based and argued than its obvious predecessor, Richard Deacon’s A History of the Chinese Secret Service (1974)."
- Vikram Sood, former director of the Research and Analysis Wing, India's foreign intelligence service, wrote the foreword for the book's 2022 release in India, and lauded Faligot for his “considerable research."
- University of Miami professor and Foreign Policy Research Institute fellow June Teufel Dreyer criticized the book for many anachronistic conclusions and misattributions, writing in Japan Forward in 2019 that "few will doubt Faligot’s conclusions...still, for those who want to better understand Chinese intelligence operations, this is not the book to read."
- Robert Wihtol, former Asian Development Bank country director for China and director general for East Asia described the book as "groundbreaking" and full of "essential, valuable insights" in a 2020 editorial for the Australian Strategic Policy Institute.
- In comparing the book to Mattis and Brazil's Chinese Communist Espionage, a 2019 review in The Economist states that "Mr Faligot writes evocatively. Too evocatively, perhaps", and implies that the book lends itself to conspiratorial minded McCarthyism, suggesting that "readers of his engrossing book might be prone to find Chinese spies everywhere, lurking like “deep-water fish” in Chinese communities from Vancouver to Sydney."
