= Les Fugitives =

Les Fugitives is a London-based independent publisher founded in 2014 by translator Cécile Lee Menon. They started with a focus on Francophone female authors that have previously not been published in English translation, but their list has now expanded to include originals in English and male authors. Their titles, authors and translators have won many awards, including the Scott Moncrieff Prize for translators Natasha Lehrer and Cécile Lee Menon for Suite for Barbara Loden in 2016 and the Neustadt International Prize for Literature for Ananda Devi in 2024.

== Works ==
- Suite for Barbara Loden by Nathalie Léger. Translated by Natasha Lehrer and Cécile Menon. Winner of the Scott Moncrieff Prize 2016, shortlisted for the French-American Foundation Translation Prize 2017 and longlisted for the Albertine Prize 2017.
- Eve Out of Her Ruins by Ananda Devi. Translated by Jeffrey Zuckerman. Winner of the Prix des cinq continents de la Francophonie 2006 and winner of the CLMP Firecracker Award in Fiction 2017. Finalist for the inaugural TA First Translation Prize 2018, the Albertine Prize 2017, and the Best Translated Book Award 2017.
- Blue Self-Portrait by Noémi Lefebvre. Translated by Sophie Lewis. Shortlisted for the Republic of Consciousness Prize for Small Presses 2018 and for the Scott Moncrieff Prize 2018.
- Translation as Transhumance by Mireille Gansel. Translated by Ros Schwartz. Winner of an English PEN Award 2017 and a French Voices Award 2015. Longlisted for the Jan Michalski Foundation Literature Prize 2013.
- NOW, NOW, LOUISON by Jean Frémon. Translated by Cole Swensen. Longlisted for the Republic of Consciousness Prize for Small Presses 2019
- The Governesses by Anne Serre. Translated by Mark Hutchinson
- Selfies by Sylvie Weil. Translated by Ros Schwartz
- This Tilting World by Colette Fellous. Translated by Sophie Lewis
- The Living Days by Ananda Devi. Translated by Jeffrey Zuckerman
- A Respectable Occupation by Julia Kerninon. Translated by Ruth Diver
- Little Dancer Aged Fourteen by Camille Laurens. Translated by Willard Wood
- Exposition by Nathalie Léger. Translated by Amanda DeMarco
