= Suite for Barbara Loden =

2013 French edition (publ. Gallimard)

Suite for Barbara Loden (French: Supplément à la vie de Barbara Loden) is a 2012 book by Nathalie Léger. The book was first offered in English translation by UK publishers Les Fugitives in 2015 with a translation by Natasha Lehrer and Cécile Menon; the following year it was published in the U.S. by Dorothy, a publishing project.

Léger was inspired to write the piece after being asked to write an encyclopedia entry on Barbara Loden's only film as director, the 1970 film Wanda. Delving into research she found herself with enough material to write a short book, a slight biography based largely on the recollections of others and an understanding of Wanda as partly autobiographical.

An excerpt from the book was published in the fall 2016 issue of The Paris Review.
