= Sad Tiger (memoir) =

2022 novel by Natasha Lehrer

Sad Tiger book jacket

Sad Tiger is a memoir by the French writer Neige Sinno, originally released in France as Triste Tigre in 2023. An English translation by Natasha Lehrer was published by Seven Stories Press in 2025.

== Synopsis ==
The author, Neige Sinno, was sexually abused by her stepfather beginning at age seven. At age 19, she reported the abuse, which resulted in a public trial and a prison sentence for her stepfather. Following these events, Sinno moved to Mexico. A primary focus of the book is exploring how speaking openly about severe trauma can help others navigate similar experiences. The title inspired by William Blake’s poem The Tyger. The book employs a fragmented narrative to examine the memories of herself, her mother, and her stepfather.

== Accolades ==
According to the Leslie Camhi, writing for The New Yorker, this book was "dubbed “a literary tour de force” by French critics on its publication, in 2023, short-listed for the Goncourt, and awarded more than a dozen other prizes, including the Prix Femina and the 2024 Strega European Prize". Under the original title of Triste Tigre the book was awarded Goncourt Prizes in the United States, the United Kingdom, Belgium, Sweden, Slovakia, India, Turkey, Tunisia, and South Korea.
