= Jeffrey Zuckerman =

American literary translator (born 1987)

Jeffrey M. Zuckerman
- Born: 1987 (age 38–39) St. Louis, Missouri, U.S.
- Occupation: Translator

Jeffrey Zuckerman is a translator of French literature. His work centers on contemporary fiction from mainland France and Mauritius—including Ananda Devi, Shenaz Patel, and Carl de Souza—as well as texts of the queer canon—including Jean Genet and Hervé Guibert. Zuckerman lives in New York City.

In a 2016 interview, he described the role his translation of Ananda Devi's Eve Out of Her Ruins had on his career as a translator: "I translated the first few pages practically as I read them, and then emailed Ananda Devi out of nowhere, asking if there was any chance she might consider letting me translate this book into English. She said yes, and, well, the rest is history." The translation won a CLMP Firecracker Award for Fiction.

== Selected translations ==
=== Nathacha Appanah ===
- Nothing Belongs to You (MacLehose Press, 2024)

=== Jean-Michel Basquiat ===
- Les Cahiers (translated into French with David Ferrière, 2018)

=== Thomas Clerc ===
- Interior (Farrar, Straus and Giroux, 2018)
- “Out of Debt” (Hotel Cordel no. 1, 2019)

=== The Dardenne Brothers ===
- On the Back of Our Images, vol. 1 (Featherproof Books, 2019)

=== Ananda Devi ===
- Eve Out of Her Ruins (Deep Vellum, 2016; Les Fugitives, 2016; Speaking Tiger Books, 2017)
- The Living Days (Feminist Press, 2019; Les Fugitives, 2020)
- “Kari Disan" (Words Without Borders, 2017)
- “Ice Blue” (The Paris Review, 2023)

=== Jean Genet ===
- The Criminal Child (New York Review Books, 2020)

=== Hervé Guibert ===
- Written in Invisible Ink: Selected Stories (Semiotext(e), 2020)
- My Manservant and Me: Madcap Novel (Nightboat Books, 2022)

=== Alain Guiraudie ===
- Now the Night Begins (Semiotext(e), 2018)

=== Karim Kattan ===
- “Salt Air” (The Dial, 2025)
- The Palace on the Higher Hill (Foundry Editions, 2025)

=== Kevin Lambert ===
- “Édouard's Sixteen” (Granta, 2022)

=== Caroline Laurent ===
- An Impossible Return (AmazonCrossing, 2022)

=== Shenaz Patel ===
- Silence of the Chagos (Restless Books, 2019)

=== Titaua Peu ===
- Pina (Restless Books, 2022)

=== Adèle Rosenfeld ===
- Jellyfish Have No Ears (Graywolf Press, 2024)
- “The Hearing-Aid Brigade” (Words Without Borders, 2025)

=== Jean-Jacques Schuhl ===
- Dusty Pink (Semiotext(e), 2018)

=== Carl de Souza ===
- Kaya Days (Two Lines Press, 2021)

=== Antoine Volodine and his heteronyms ===
- “The Fringe of Reality” (The White Review, 2014)
- “Post-Exotic Novels, Nȯvelles, and Novelists” (The New Inquiry, 2015)
- “The Year of Octobers” (Hayden's Ferry, 2015)
- Radiant Terminus (Open Letter Books, 2017)
- “Slogans” by Maria Sudayeva (The White Review, 2017)
- Black Village by Lutz Bassmann (Open Letter Books, 2022)

== Awards ==
Zuckerman's translation of Devi's Eve Out of Her Ruins was shortlisted for the Best Translated Book Award, the Albertine Prize, and the TA First Translation Prize, and won the CLMP Firecracker Award. His translation of Devi's The Living Days was shortlisted for the French-American Foundation Translation Prize. In 2016, Zuckerman was awarded a PEN/Heim Translation Grant to translate Hervé Guibert's short stories. Several of his translations—including Now the Night Begins, The Living Days, and Black Village—have received French Voices grants; in 2020, Pina won the Grand Prize. Also in 2020, Zuckerman was named a Chevalier dans l’ordre des Arts et des Lettres by the French government.
