= Vincent de Swarte =

French writer (1963–2006)

- Born: 15 June 1963; Montauban (Tarn-et-Garonne)
- Died: 24 April 2006 (aged 42); Paris
- Occupation: Novelist

Vincent de Swarte (15 June 1963 – 24 April 2006) was a French writer author of varied novels ranging from books for youth (Le Carrousel des mers) to crime fictions (Pharricide).

== Biography ==
After studying political science in Bordeaux, he worked more than a decade in advertising. In 1996, he published a first book for young people entitled Le Carrousel des mers. Two years later appeared Pharricide, a novel centered on a lighthouse keeper adept at taxidermy. In 1999, the writer received a special mention of the Prix Wepler for his novel Requiem pour un sauvage. He evokes the Chernobyl disaster in Le Paradis existe (2001), chronicle of a village in Ukraine. He then tries to autofiction tinged with fantasy in Elle et moi (2005).

He was carried away by cancer at the age of 43.

== Works ==
- 1996: Le Carrousel des mers, littérature jeunesse, Éditions Gallimard
- 1998: Pharricide, roman, Calmann-Lévy
- 1999: Requiem pour un sauvage, novel, Éditions Pauvert, Prix Wepler
- 1999: La Chapelle aux oiseaux : conte de Noël, novel, Éditions Pauvert
- 1999: La Dernière corrida, littérature jeunesse, Pocket
- 1999: Le Cirque de la lune, littérature jeunesse, Gallimard Jeunesse
- 2001: Le Paradis existe, novel, Éditions Pauvert
- 2002: Lynx, novel, Éditions Denoël
- 2003: Petit Bloï, littérature jeunesse, Gallimard Jeunesse,
- 2005: Elle est moi, novel, éditions Denoël
- 2005: Une photo de toi, novel, Éditions Thierry Magnier
- 2006: Journal d'un père, autobiography, Éditions Ramsay
- 2007: Pharanoïa, short stories, Éditions Denoël

== Tribute ==
In 2006, the éditions Thierry Magnier created "Photo roman", a series in tribute to Vincent de Swart.
