= Jean-Hubert Gailliot =

French writer and publisher

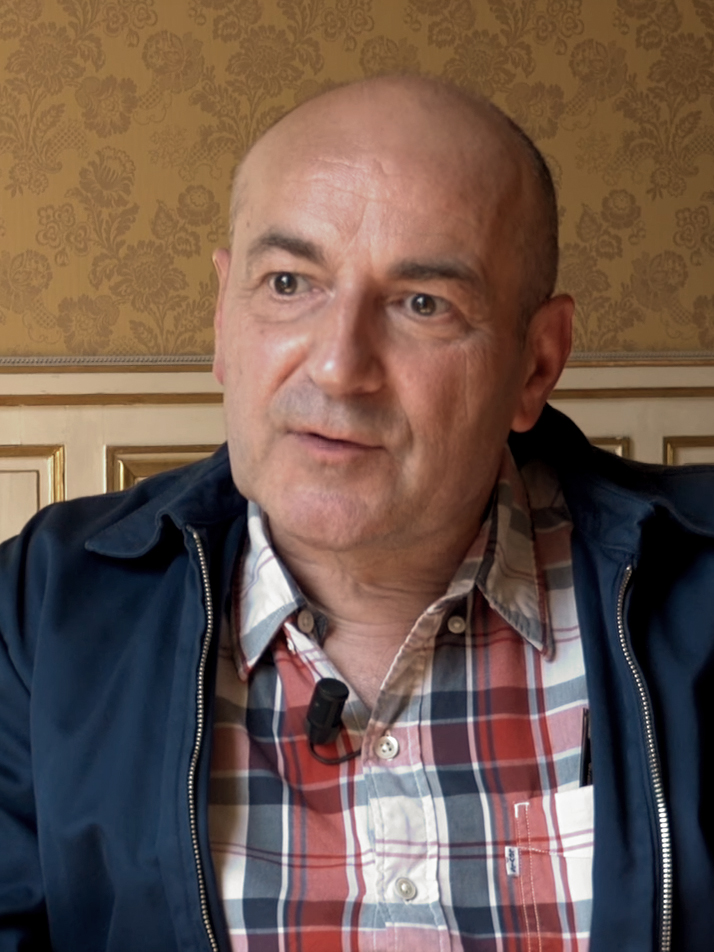
Jean-Hubert Gailliot (2018)

Jean-Hubert Gailliot (born 1961) is a French writer and publisher. Along Sylvie Martigny, he was one of the cofounder of the éditions Tristram in 1989.

== Works ==
- 1997: La Vie magnétique, Paris, Éditions de l'Olivier, 125 p. ISBN 2-87929-145-3
- 2000: Les Contrebandiers, Éditions de l’Olivier, 189 p. ISBN 2-87929-244-1
- 2004: L’Hacienda, Éditions de l’Olivier, 318 p. ISBN 2-87929-318-9
- 2004: 30 minutes à Harlem, Éditions de l’Olivier, series "Petite bibliothèque de l’Olivier", 58 p. ISBN 2-87929-475-4
- 2006: Bambi Frankenstein, Éditions de l’Olivier, 121 p. ISBN 2-87929-486-X
- 2014: Le Soleil, Éditions de l’Olivier, 529 p. ISBN 978-2-87929-635-7 - Prix Wepler 2014
