= Pavel Hak =

Czech author (born 1962)

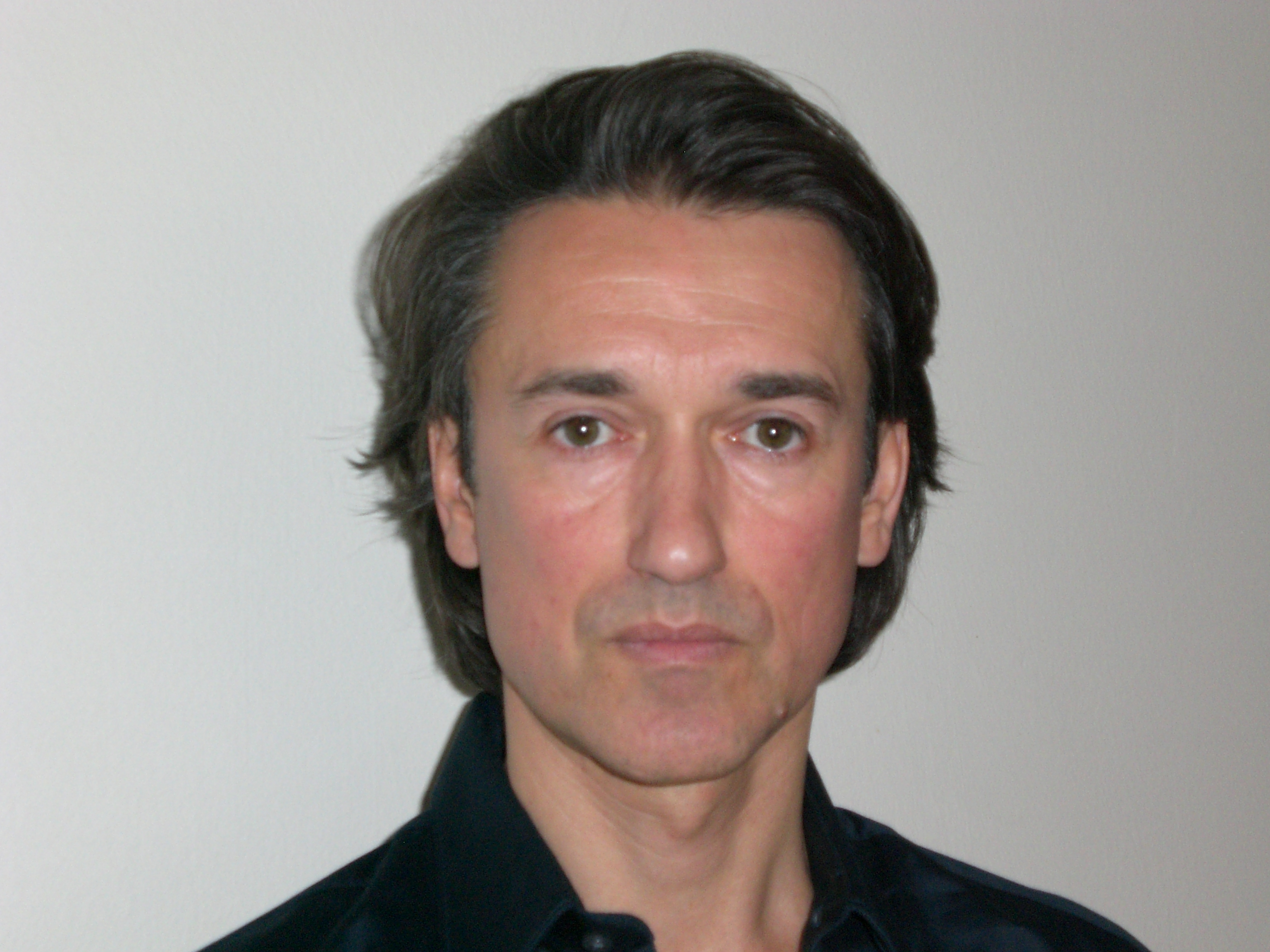
Pavel Hak

Pavel Hak (born 1962 in Tábor) is a Czech author. He lives in France and writes in French.

== Career ==
Exiled to France in 1986, he studied philosophy at the Sorbonne. He writes in French. He has published six books, Safari, Sniper, Lutte à mort, Trans (Trans won the Prix Wepler in 2006), Warax and Vomito negro though the second is the only one published in English translation. Sniper (2005) is a graphic account of genocide and torture in an unnamed country. It met with largely positive reviews on publication in the UK and the USA.

== Bibliography ==
- Safari (novel), Tristram, 2001
- Sniper (novel), Tristram, 2002
- Lutte à mort (theatre), Tristram, 2004
- Trans (novel), Seuil, 2006
- Warax (novel), Seuil, 2009
- Vomito negro (novel), Verdier, 2011
