= Hélène Frappat =

Hélène Frappat (2 September 1969 in Paris) is a French writer, translator and critic of cinema.

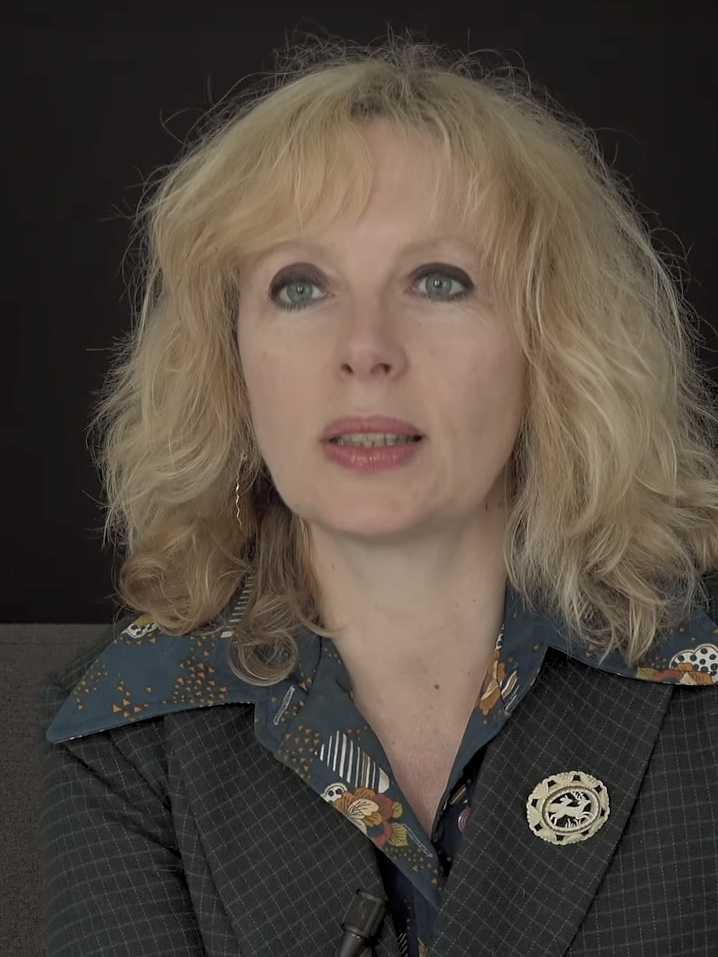
Image of Hélène Frappat

== Biography ==
A former student of the École Normale Supérieure (class 1989), she holds an agrégation of philosophy and a ph.d in letters. She is the author of numerous translations, including The Origins of Totalitarianism by Hannah Arendt, Études sur la personnalité autoritaire by Theodor W. Adorno, Amitié by Samson Raphaelson). On France Culture, she produced the monthly cinema magazine "Rien à voir", from 2004 to 2009, as well as numerous documentaries.

She is the author of nine novels published by Éditions Allia and Actes Sud. She has been translating the novels of Ann Patchett as well as Laura Lippman’s since 2019.

In 2016, she participated in the Assises Internationales du Roman in Lyon.

Her last novel, Trois femmes disparaissent, is based upon the lives of Tippi Hedren, her daughter Melanie Griffith and her granddaughter Dakota Johnson. The novel has met critical acclaim and is currently being adapted by the IRCAM.

== Bibliography ==
Novels

- 2004: Sous réserve, Paris, Éditions Allia, 124 p. ISBN 978-2844851635.
- 2007: L'Agent de liaison, Paris, Éditions Allia, 142 p. ISBN 978-2844852533.
- 2009: Par effraction, Paris, Éditions Allia, 128 p. ISBN 978-2844853196

– Prix Wepler-Fondation La Poste – Mention Spéciale, 2009.

- 2011: Inverno, Arles, France, Éditions Actes Sud, series "Un endroit où aller", 140 p. ISBN 978-2742799091. then Actes Sud, series "Babel", 2016 Lady Hunt, Arles, France, Éditions Actes Sud, series "Domaine français", 2013, 320 p. ISBN 978-2-330-02355-3, then Actes Sud, series "Babel", 2016 ISBN 2330053177.

– Sélection Prix Mauvais genres 2013.
– Sélection Franz-Hessel-Preis 2014.

- 2014: N'oublie pas de respirer, Arles, France, Éditions Actes Sud, series "Essence", 64 p. ISBN 978-2-330-03726-0

– Sélection Franz-Hessel-Preis 2015.
– Sélection Prix des lycéens et apprentis de l'Ile de France

- 2019: Le Dernier Fleuve, Actes Sud
- 2021: Le Mont Fuji n’existe pas, Actes Sud
- 2023: Trois femmes disparaissent, Actes Sud

Essays

- 2000: La Violence, Paris, Flammarion, series "Corpus", 251 p. ISBN 978-2-08-073042-8
- 2001: Jacques Rivette, secret compris, Paris, Cahiers du cinéma, 255 p. ISBN 978-2-86642-281-3.
- 2008: Roberto Rossellini, Paris, Cahiers du cinéma, 94 p. ISBN 978-2-86642-483-1
- Trois films fantômes de Jacques Rivette, Paris, Cahiers du cinéma, 2002, 110 p. ISBN 978-2866423223.
