= Linda Lê =

French writer (1963–2022)

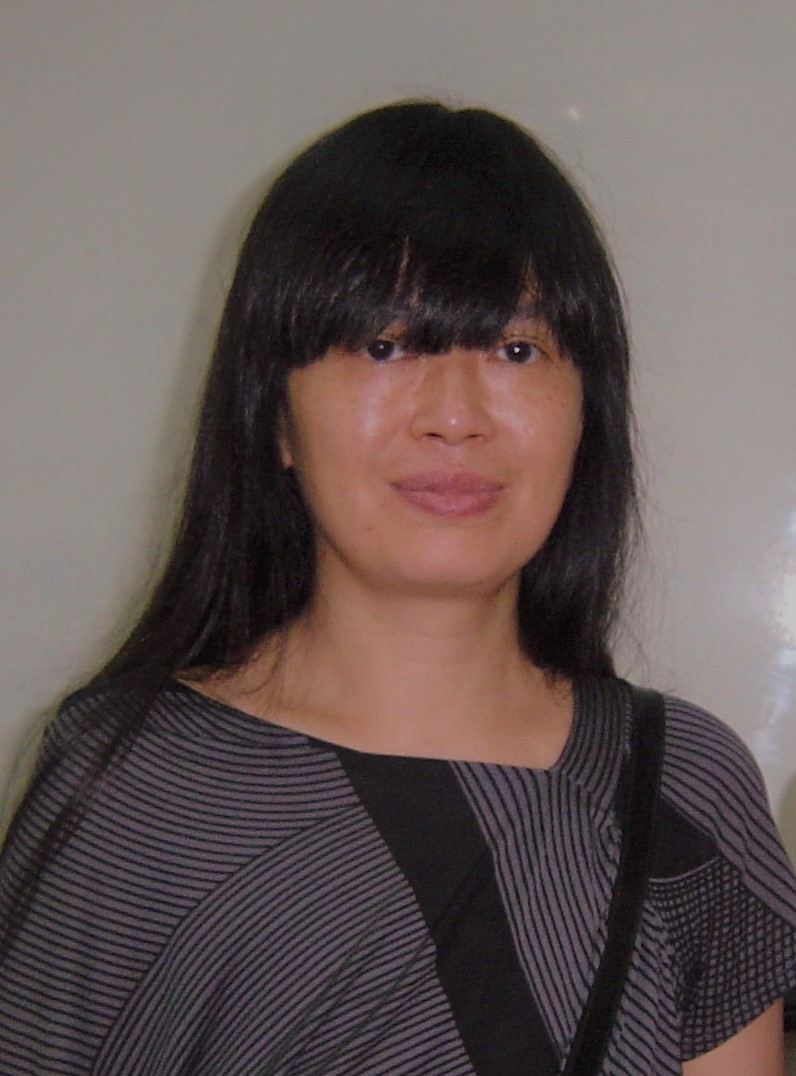
Linda Lê in 2010

Linda Lê (1963 – 9 May 2022) was a French writer. She was a recipient of the Fénéon Prize, the Prix Wepler, the Prix Renaudot du livre de poche, and the Prince Pierre de Monaco literary prize.

== Biography ==
Lê was born in 1963 in Da Lat to a Vietnamese father and a French mother. Refugees of the Vietnam War, Lê and her mother moved to France in 1977. Her father stayed back in Vietnam and died in 1995.

She published her debut novel when she was 23. She was awarded the Fénéon Prize in 1997 for her book Les Trois Parques and the Prix Wepler in 2010 for Cronos. In 2011, she published 'À l'enfant que je n'aurai pas,' an autofictional letter which won the Prix Renaudot du livre de poche. In 2019, she was awarded the Prince Pierre de Monaco literary prize for her works as a whole.

She died on 9 May 2022, at the age of 58.

== Works ==
=== Novels ===
- Calomnies, Paris: Christian Bourgois (1993)
  - Translated by Esther Allen as Slander, Lincoln: University of Nebraska Press (1996)
- Les Dits d'un idiot, Paris: Christian Bourgois (1995)
- Les Trois Parques, Paris: Christian Bourgois (1997)
  - Translated by Mark Polizzotti as The Three Fates, New York: New Directions (2010)
- Lettre morte, Paris: Christian Bourgois (1999)
- Cronos, Paris: Christian Bourgois (2010)
- À l'enfant que je n'aurai pas, Paris: Nil (2011)
- Lame de fond, Paris: Christian Bourgois (2012)
- Héroïnes, Paris: Christian Bourgois (2017)

=== Essays ===
- Au fond de l'inconnu pour trouver du nouveau, Paris: Christian Bourgois (2009)
- Chercheurs d'ombres, Paris: Christian Bourgois (2017)
