= Sleeping Children =

2022 novel by Anthony Passeron

- The first US edition
- Author: Anthony Passeron
- Translator: Frank Wynne
- Genre: Historical fiction, Domestic fiction, Auto fiction, Drama
- Publisher: Globe, Picador (UK); Farrar, Straus and Giroux (US)
- Publication date: August 25, 2022 (FR)
- Publication place: France
- English publication date: March 6, 2025 (UK)
- Pages: 288 (FR paperback); 256 (FR pocket); 240 (UK paperback); 208 (US hardback)
- ISBN: 978-1035026494
- OCLC: 1431883375
- Dewey Decimal: 843/.92
- LC Class: PQ2716.A37726 E5413 2025
- Followed by: Jacky

Sleeping Children (French: Les Enfants endormis) is a 2022 novel by French writer Anthony Passeron, which won, the Prix Wepler, the Prix Première RTBF and more than a dozen others. Autobiographical, it tells two parallel stories: the emergence and fight against HIV in French hospitals between 1981 and 2008, and the story of a family of provincial merchants faced with denial, silence, and the weight of social scrutiny. He began writing the book in 2017 while teaching at a high school and says he thought of his students: he researched and accurately described the progress of scientific research.

== Synopsis ==
The book is divided into two parts: each even-numbered chapter focuses on the author's family background, told 40 years after the death of his uncle 'Désiré', while the odd-numbered chapters focus on the progress of AIDS research.

== Main characters ==
- Désiré, the family's favourite son, sent to the city to take on studies.
- Jacques, Désiré's brother (also known as Jacky, eponymous title of the author's second book and sequel to this story), relied upon for the butchery's hard work, and for helping out his older brother once he gets in trouble in Amsterdam.
- Maya, Désiré's girlfriend
- Louise, the author's grandmother of Italian descent
- Emile, the grandfather, a local butcher like his father
- The first person narrator and his brother
- Researchers, including: Willy Rozenbaum; Françoise Brun-Vézinet; Jacques Leibowitch; Luc Montagnier; Robert Gallo

=== Family story ===
The story opens with the author's family, particularly Désiré, a charismatic young man admired within his community. Over time, following a trip to Amsterdam and some unfortunate encounters, Désiré descends into heroin addiction, which shocks the family. The family experiences a gradual tragedy, punctuated by desperate efforts to save him. This struggle is directed not only against drugs, but also against the gaze of others and the weight of appearances in a small rural community. When Désiré contracts HIV through the use of contaminated needles, it is a new ordeal for the family. The disease invades their daily lives, shattering their certainties and forcing everyone to confront a tragic reality they can no longer hide. Suffering, shame, and denial are omnipresent. Through the author's eyes, we observe the fragility of family ties but also their strength in the face of adversity. The tragedy takes on a new dimension with the birth of Désiré's daughter, Émilie. Infected by her mother during pregnancy, the disease strikes this innocent child hard. After the death of both her parents, the young girl is surrounded only by her family and must cope with this scourge. Unlike Désiré, who is the center of the family's denial, Émilie becomes the symbol of the injustice of the disease. Her presence awakens a brutal realization among the family members: AIDS is no longer a distant evil; it is there, present in the body of an innocent child. Her illness acts as a catalyst, forcing the family to emerge from its silence and confront the magnitude of the tragedy a second time since Désiré's death.

=== Medical research ===
Alongside this family tragedy, Anthony Passeron takes a broader perspective, tracing the history of scientific research on AIDS. These chapters recount the first appearances of the disease in the early 1980s, notably through the mysterious "pneumocystosis" detected in the United States. Doctors gradually identified the link with the homosexual community, but then realized that other groups, such as heroin addicts and transfusion recipients, were also affected. The author highlights the trial and error of medical teams, the rivalries between French and American researchers, as well as the progress toward the discovery of HIV in 1983, followed by the development of triple therapy in the 1990s. He pays tribute to the work of French researchers, sometimes marginalized compared to their more influential American counterparts. This part of the story highlights the urgency, complexity, and fierceness of the fight against AIDS, an invisible and formidable enemy. Each step forward seems tiny compared to the scale and urgency of the problem, but French researchers are not losing hope.

Sleeping Children is thus a double novel: a family fresco on the drama of addiction and illness, and a dive into the collective history of medical research.

== Reception ==
A local newspaper reportedly sold 40,000 units, helping the author to sell over 80,000 units before the US publication. Some translated versions sold out (Finnish Tartunta).

=== Literary prizes ===
Laureate:

- Prix Première Plume 2022
- Prix Wepler Fondation La Poste 2022
- Prix Culture et Bibliothèque pour tous 2023
- Prix des lectrices et des lecteurs des bibliothèques de la Ville de Paris 2023
- Prix des Lycéens de Sceaux 2023
- Prix du premier roman de la ville de Limoges 2023
- Prix Première RTBF 2023
- Prix du roman Coiffard 2023
- Prix Summer 2023
- Prix Un livre ou verre 2023
- Prix des Lecteurs 2024

Finalist:

- Prix de Flore 2022
- Prix Médicis essai 2022
- Prix du Roman Fnac 2022
- Prix du Livre Inter 2023
- Prix des Libraires 2023

== Translations ==
The book has been translated into:

- English, by Frank Wynne as Sleeping Children (released in U.K. before U.S.)
- Italian, by Chiara Manfrinato, as I ragazzi addormentati
- German, by Claudia Marquardt as Die Schlafenden
- Dutch, by Hester Tollenaar, as De slapende kinderen Hester Tollenaar
- Catalan, by Lluís-Anton Baulenas, as Els fills adormits
- Spanish, by Palmira Feixas, as Los hijos dormidos
- Polish, by UśpioneJacek Giszczak
- Danish, by Rasmus Stenfalk, Sovende børn
- Finnish, as Tartunta
- Swedish, by Marianne Tufvesson, as De sovande barnen
- Norwegian by Bokmål and Nynorsk, as Sovende barn
- Portuguese, by Camila Boldrini(Os meninos adormecidos)
- Brazilian Portuguese, by Diogo Paiva as As Crianças Adormecidas

== Adaptations ==
- An audiobook read by Loïc Corbery is available
- In 2025, a TV series adaptation was shot.
