= Céline Minard =

French writer (born 1969)

Céline Minard (born 1969 in Rouen) is a French writer.

== Biography ==
After studying philosophy, she devoted herself to the work of writing, sometimes collaborating with visual artists. Her work would mark "the return of pure and hard fiction in the French literary landscape".

In 2007 and 2008, she was a resident of the Villa Médicis in Rome. In 2011, she was a resident of Villa Kujoyama in Kyoto in Japan.

In 2008, her 4th novel, Bastard Battle, was rewarded with a special mention by the jury of the Prix Wepler.

In 2011, she received the prestigious Franz-Hessel-Preis for So Long Luise. With Faillir être flingué, she was rewarded with several prizes including the Prix Virilo in 2013 and the Prix du Livre Inter in 2014.

== Works ==
- 2004: R., Comp'Act.
- 2005: La Manadologie, Musica Falsa Éditions
- 2007: Le Dernier Monde, Denoël.
- 2008: Bastard battle, Éditions Léo Scheer, coll. « Laureli »
- 2010: Olimpia, Denoël
- 2011: So long, Luise, Denoël
- 2011: Les Ales, in collaboration with scomparo, Cambourakis
- 2013: Faillir être flingué, Payot & Rivages.
- 2014: KA TA, emballé by scomparo, Rivages
- 2016: Le Grand Jeu, Rivages
- 2021: Plasmas

== Distinctions ==
- Special mention of the Prix Wepler 2008 for Bastard battle
- Franz-Hessel Prize 2011 for So long, Luise
- Prix Virilo 2013 for Faillir être flingué
- Prix du Style 2013 for Faillir être flingué
- Prix du Livre Inter 2014 for Faillir être flingué
- Sélection Prix Mauvais genres 2013 for Faillir être flingué.
