= Prix Wepler =

French literary award

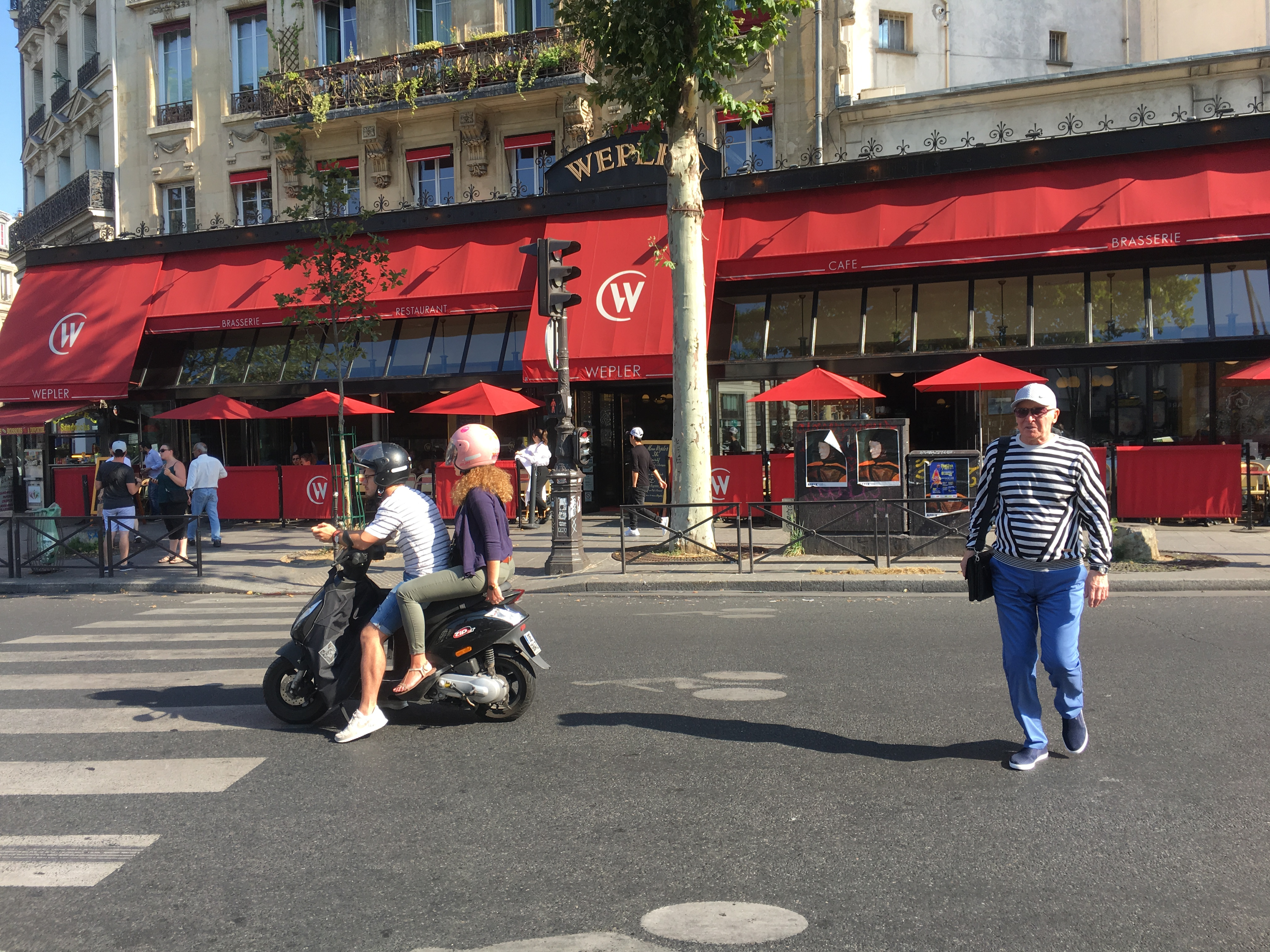
The Wepler Brewery supports the Prix Wepler

The prix Wepler is a French literary award established in 1998 at the initiative of the Abbesses Bookshop, with the support of the La Poste Foundation, and the Brasserie Wepler (Place Clichy, 18th arrondissement of Paris) and which distinguishes, in the month of November, a contemporary author. It works with a rotating jury system.

== Laureates ==
=== Prix Wepler ===
- 1998: Florence Delaporte, Je n'ai pas de château
- 1999: Antoine Volodine, Des anges mineurs
- 2000: Laurent Mauvignier, Apprendre à finir
- 2001: Yves Pagès, Le Théoriste
- 2002: Marcel Moreau, Corpus Scripti
- 2003: Éric Chevillard, Le Vaillant Petit Tailleur
- 2004: François Bon, Daewoo
- 2005: Richard Morgiève, Vertig
- 2006: Pavel Hak, Trans
- 2007: Olivia Rosenthal, On n'est pas là pour disparaître
- 2008: Emmanuelle Pagano, Les Mains gamines
- 2009: Lyonel Trouillot, Yanvalou pour Charlie
- 2010: Linda Lê, Cronos
- 2011: Éric Laurrent, Les Découvertes
- 2012: Leslie Kaplan, Millefeuille
- 2013: Marcel Cohen, Sur la Scène intérieure. Faits
- 2014: Jean-Hubert Gailliot, Le Soleil
- 2015: Pierre Senges, Achab (séquelles)
- 2016: Stéphane Audeguy, Histoire du lion Personne
- 2017: Guillaume Poix, Les Fils conducteurs
- 2018: Nathalie Léger, La Robe blanche
- 2019: Lucie Taïeb, Les Échappées
- 2020: Grégory Le Floch, De parcourir le monde et d'y rôder
- 2021: Antoine Wauters, Mahmoud ou la montée des eaux
- 2022: Anthony Passeron, Les Enfants endormis
- 2023: Elisa Shua Dusapin, Le vieil incendie

=== Special mention ===
The special mention of the Wepler-Fondation La Poste Prize rewards a work marked by an audacity, an excess, a singularity escaping any commercial purpose.

- 1999: Vincent de Swarte, Requiem pour un sauvage, Jean-Jacques Pauvert
- 2000: Richard Morgiève, Ma vie folle, Pauvert
- 2001: Brigitte Giraud, À présent, Stock
- 2002: Thierry Beinstingel, Composants, Fayard
- 2003: Alain Satgé, Tu n'écriras point, Éditions du Seuil
- 2004: Jean-Louis Magnan, Anti-Liban, Verticales
- 2005: Zahia Rahmani, « Musulman » Roman, Sabine Wespieser
- 2006: Héléna Marienské, Rhésus, Éditions POL
- 2007: Louise Desbrusses, Couronnes boucliers armures, POL
- 2008: Céline Minard, Bastard Battle, Éditions Scheer
- 2009: Hélène Frappat, Par effraction, Allia
- 2010: Jacques Abeille, for lifetime achievement
- 2011: François Dominique, Solène, Éditions Verdier
- 2012: Jakuta Alikavazovic, La Blonde et le Bunker, Éditions de l'Olivier
- 2013: Philippe Rahmy, Béton armé, La Table ronde
- 2014: Sophie Divry, La Condition pavillonnaire, Noir sur Blanc
- 2015: Lise Charles, Comme Ulysse, POL
- 2016: Ali Zamir, Anguille sous roche, Le Tripode
- 2017: Gaël Octavia, La Fin de Mame Baby (Gallimard)
- 2018: Bertrand Schefer, Série noire (P.O.L)
- 2019: Bruno Remaury, Le Monde horizontal (Corti) and Muriel Pic, Affranchissements (Seuil)
- 2021: Laura Vazquez, La Semaine perpétuelle (Éditions du Sous-Sol)
- 2022: Lucie Rico, GPS (éditions POL)
- 2023: Arthur Dreyfus, La troisième main
