= Éric Laurrent =

French writer

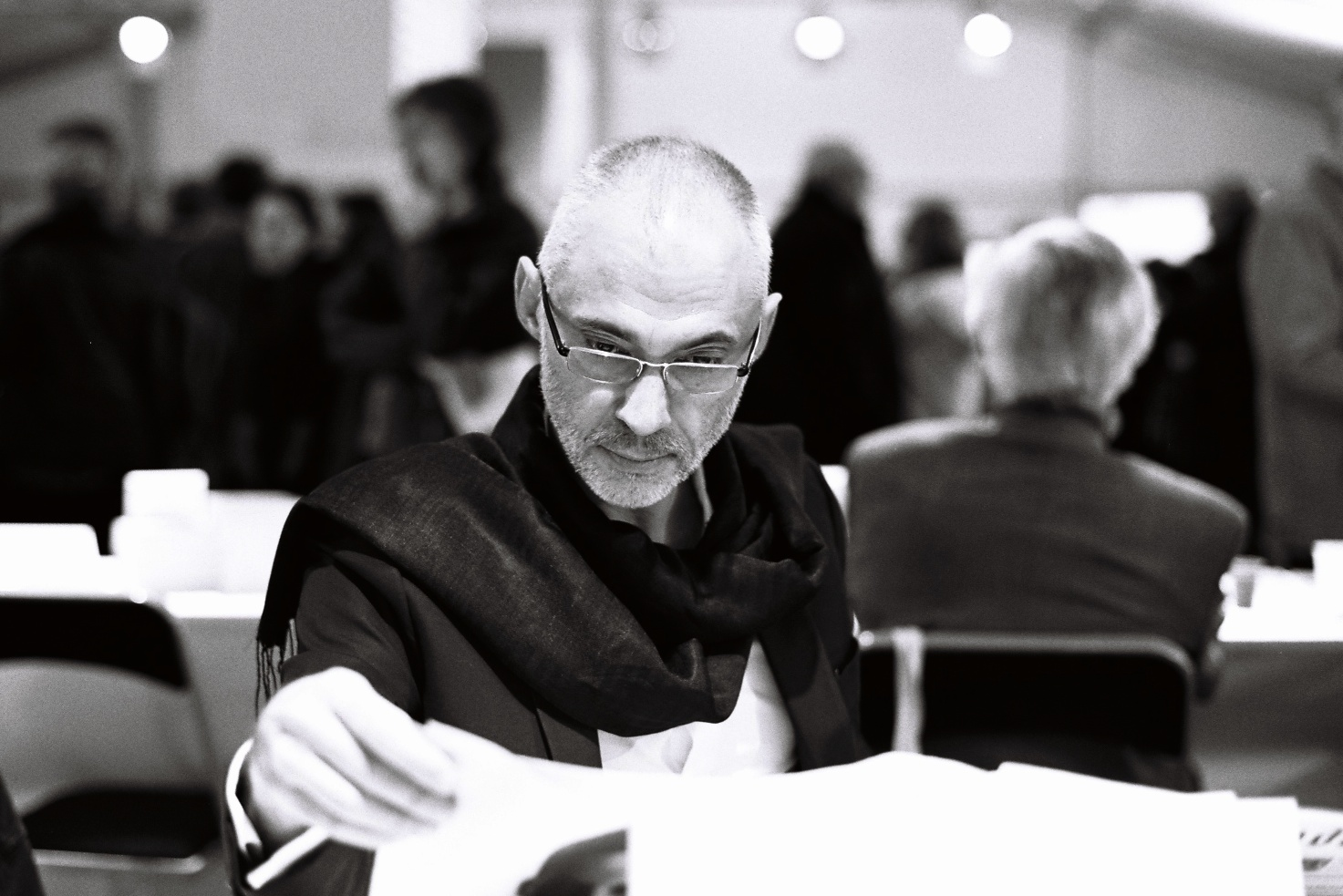
Éric Laurrent at salon du livre Radio France in 2011

Éric Laurrent (born 1966 in Clermont-Ferrand) is a contemporary French writer.

== Work ==
His work, begun in 1995 with Coup de foudre, is distinct from other works of the postmodern generation by a style that could be described as manierist or baroque. Like other postmodern authors, Eric Laurrent practices intertextuality abundantly, using each of his novels not as a rewriting of a classical work, but more as a burlesque tribute to the world's literary heritage. Thus, for example, the spy novel Les atomiques, his second novel (1996), plays on a re-reading of the Divine Comedy by Dante. Intertextuality can, in some cases, come more from intermediality, as in the case of his first novel, built around the presence in the hollow of the painting The Birth of Venus by Botticelli.

== Publications ==
- 1995: Coup de foudre, novel (Éditions de Minuit) – Prix Fénéon
- 1996: Les Atomiques, novel (Minuit)
- 1997: Liquider, novel (Minuit)
- 1999: Remue-ménage, novel (Minuit)
- 2000: Dehors, novel (Minuit)
- 2002: Ne pas toucher, novel (Minuit)
- 2004: À la fin, novel (Minuit)
- 2005: Clara Stern, novel (Minuit)
- 2008: Renaissance italienne, novel (Minuit)
- 2011: Les Découvertes, novel (Minuit) – Prix Wepler.
- 2014: Berceau, narration (Minuit)
- 2016: Un beau début, novel (Minuit) ISBN 978-2-70-732952-3 – Prix Alexandre-Vialatte.
