= Emmanuelle Salasc =

French author

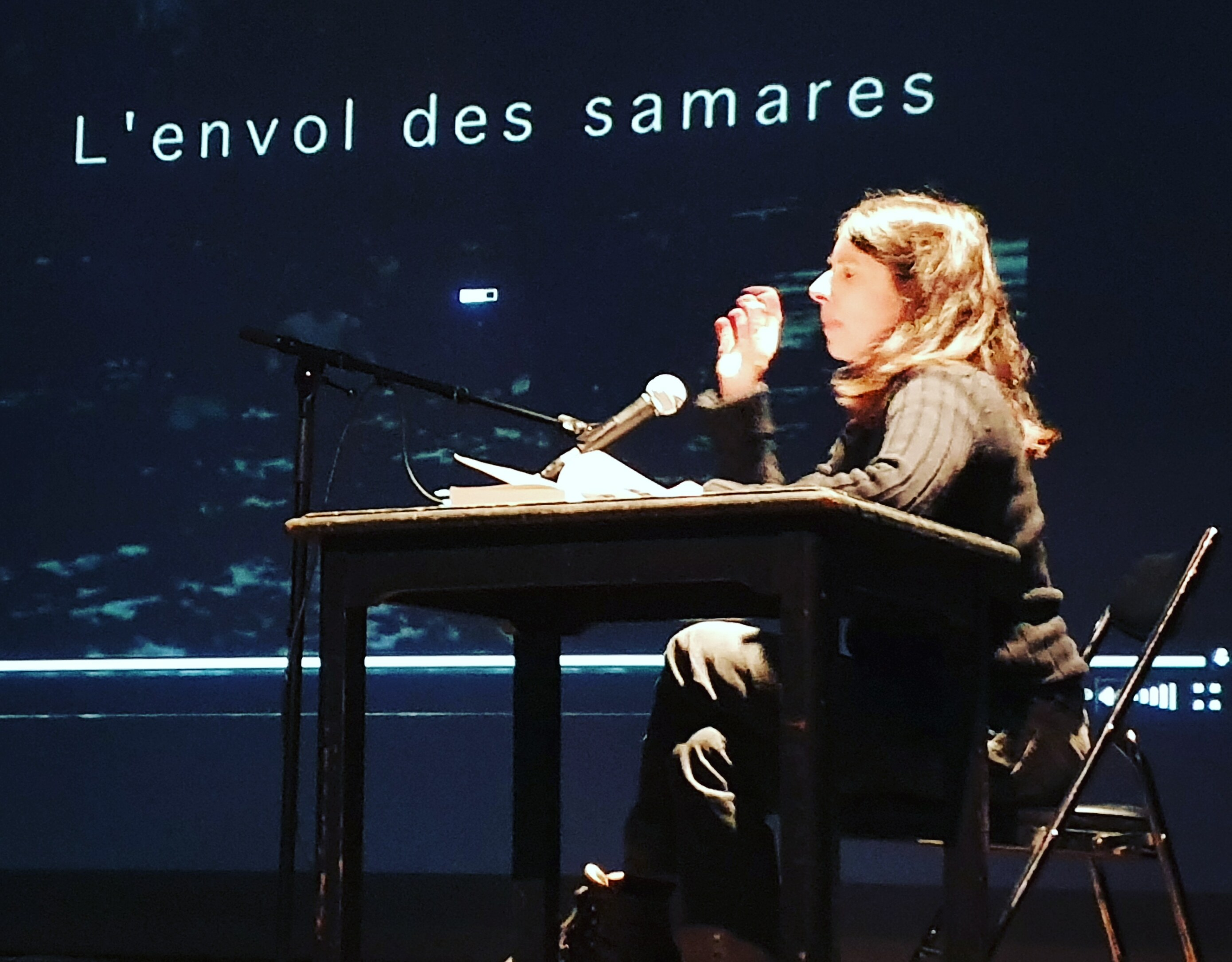
- (2019)
- Born: Emmanuelle Salasc
- Writing career
- Notable awards: European Union Prize for Literature

Emmanuelle Salasc (formerly Pagano) (born 1969) is a French author.

She has written books which have been translated into more than a dozen languages, and won the EU Prize for Literature for her novel Les Adolescents troglodytes. Her book Faces on the Tip of My Tongue was the second of her books to be translated into English and in 2020 it was longlisted for the International Booker Prize.

Salasc was born in 1969 in Aveyron. She resides in Ardèche with her family. In 2021, she began publishing under her birth surname, Salasc, having previously published using Pagano, her married surname.

== Awards ==
- Prix TSR du roman 2005 for Le Tiroir à cheveux.
- Prix Wepler 2008 for Les Mains gamines.
- Prix Rhône-Alpes du Livre 2009 for Les Mains gamines.
- Prix Rhône-Alpes de l’adaptation cinématographique 2009 for Les Adolescents troglodytes.
- Prix de Littérature de l’Union européenne 2009 for Les Adolescents troglodytes.
- Prix du Roman Ecologie 2018 for Sauf Riverains.

== Works ==
- Pour être chez moi, sous le pseudonyme d'Emma Schaak, récit, éditions du Rouergue, 2002.
- Pas devant les gens, roman, La Martinière, 2004.
- Le Tiroir à cheveux, P.O.L., roman, 2005.
- Les Adolescents troglodytes, roman, P.O.L., 2007.
- Les Mains gamines, roman, P.O.L., 2008.
- Le Guide automatique, nouvelle, Librairie Olympique, 2008.
- Toucher terre, à propos de Jacques Dupin, Publie.net, 2008.
- L'Absence d'oiseaux d'eau, roman, P.O.L., 2010.
- La Décommande, nouvelle, JRP-Ringier, coll. « Hapax Series », 2011.
- Un renard à mains nues, recueil de nouvelles, P.O.L., 2012.
- Le Travail de mourir, nouvelle, photographies de Claude Rouyer, éd. Les Inaperçus, 2013.
- Nouons-nous, roman, P.O.L., 2013.
