= Ali Zamir =

Comorian writer (born 1987)

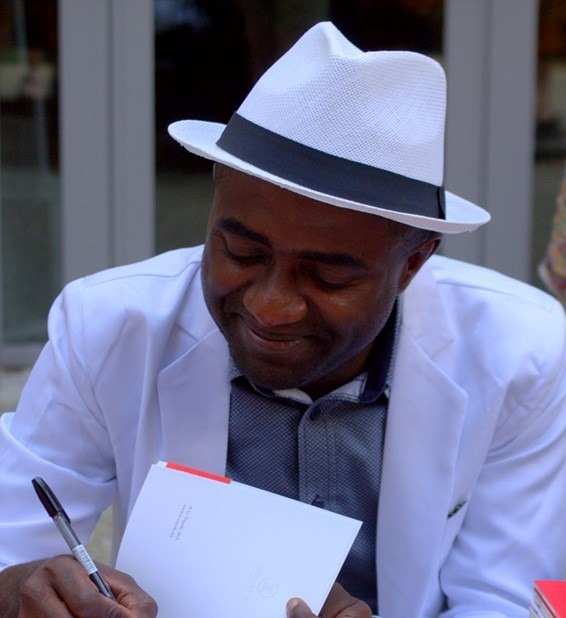
- Ali Zamir in Vienna in 2019

Ali Zamir (born 1987) is a Comorian writer. He was born in Mutsamudu on the island of Anjouan. In 2016, for his first novel, Anguille sous roche, he won the Prix Senghor and received a special mention by the Prix Wepler. He won the Prix Roman France Télévisions in 2019 for Dérangé que je suis.

== Bibliography ==
- Anguille sous roche (2016). A Girl Called Eel, trans. Aneesa Abbas Higgins (Jacaranda Books, 2019).
- Mon Étincelle (2017)
- Dérangé que je suis (2019). Deranged As I Am, trans. Alice Banks (Fum d'Estampa Press, 2022).
