= Leslie Kaplan =

American-born French writer (born 1943)

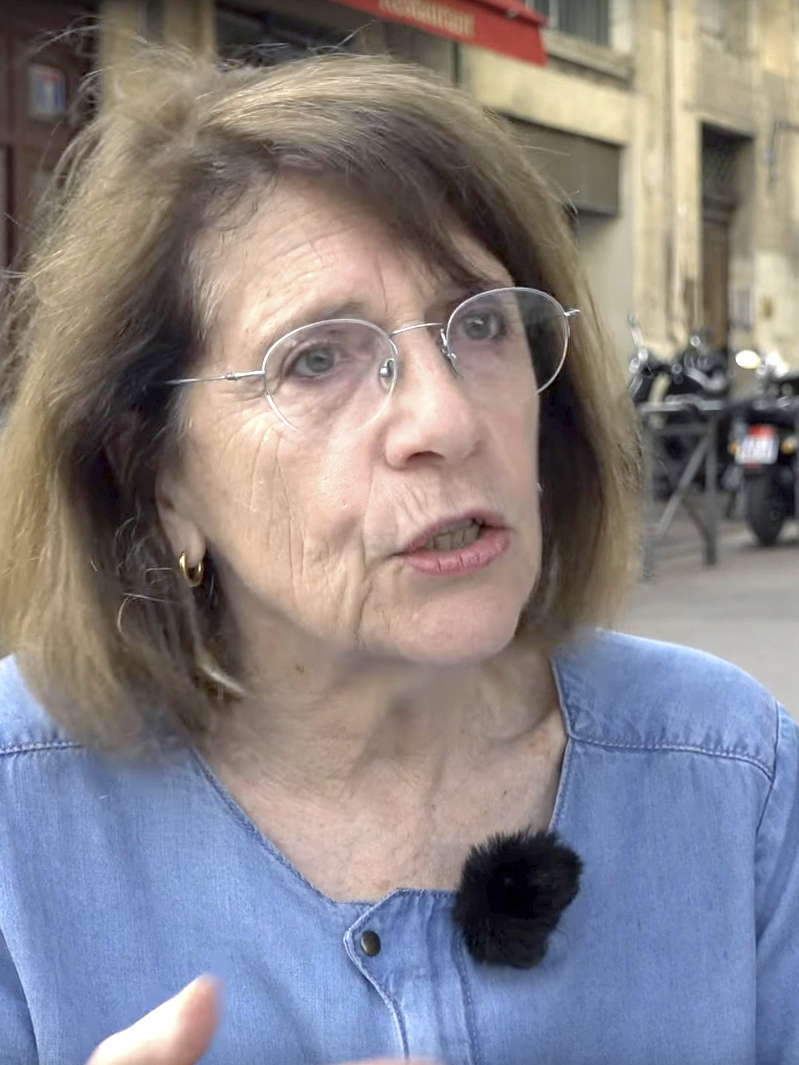
- Born: 1943 (age 82–83); New York City, New York
- Writing career
- Genres: novel, essay, theatre

Leslie Kaplan (born 1943) is an American-born French writer.

She was born in New York City and grew up in Paris. She studied philosophy, history and psychology and then worked for two years in a factory. Kaplan took part in the events of May 1968. She published her first book in 1982 L'Excès-l'usine, which received favourable comments from authors Marguerite Duras and Maurice Blanchot.

== Biography ==
Born in New York City and raised in France in an American family, Leslie Kaplan writes in French. She studied philosophy,Psychology and History. During her studies, she took part in the anti-colonial and Anti-imperialism movements against the Algerian and Vietnam wars. She worked in a factory as an “Workbench” worker from January 1968 and lived through the May 68 movement in an occupied factory.

Since 1982, she has published stories, novels, essays and theater, mainly with P.O.L.

Her first book was acclaimed by Marguerite Duras and Maurice Blanchot.

Her work has often been adapted for the stage (Claude Régy, Frédérique Lolliée, Élise Vigier, Marcial Di Fonzo Bo, etc.) and her books have been translated into a dozen languages.

Leslie Kaplan is a board member of the film magazine Trafic, founded by Serge Daney.

== Awards ==
In 2017, she received a prize from the Société des gens de lettres recognizing her work.

== Works ==
- L'Excès - l'usine (1982)
- Le Livre des ciels (1983)
- Le Criminel (1985)
- Le Pont de Brooklyn (1987)
- L'Epreuve du passeur (1988)
- Le Silence du diable (1989)
- Les Mines de sel (1993)
- Depuis maintenant, Miss Nobody Knows (1996)
- Les Prostituées philosophes (1997)
- Le Psychanalyste (1999)
- Les Amants de Marie (2002)
- Les Outils (2003)
- Fever (2005)
- Toute ma vie j'ai été une femme (2008)
- Mon Amérique commence en Pologne (2009)
- Louise, elle est folle (2011)
- Millefeuille (2012) received the Prix Wepler
- Déplace le ciel (2013)
- Mathias et la Révolution (2016)
