= Pierre Senges =

French writer (born 1968)

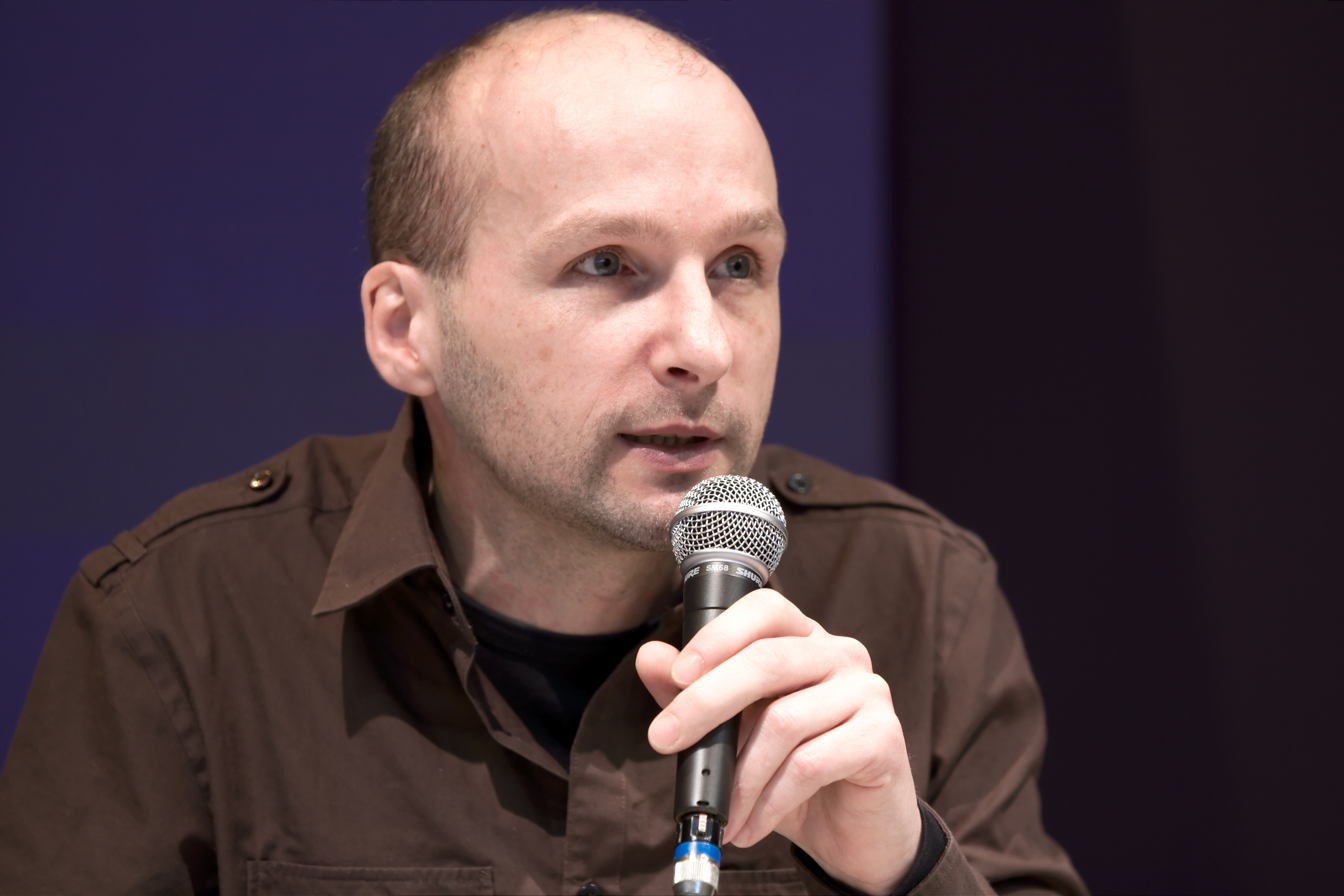
Pierre Senges in 2010

Pierre Senges (born 1968, Romans-sur-Isère) is a French writer. His work includes nineteen books, numerous essays published in literary journals, and over seventy plays for radio.

His books are sometimes noted for having a baroque prose style. They frequently combine erudition, intertextuality, and invention (Fragments of Lichtenberg, The Major Refutation) or play on the relation between historically true and fictional elements (Les carnets de Gordon McGuffin and Essais fragiles d’aplomb). Several of Senges's books and essays have been translated and published in English, including Fragments of Lichtenberg, Ahab (Sequels), The Major Refutation, Geometry in the Dust, and Studies of Silhouettes.

Senges' radio plays (fictions radiophoniques) have been produced by France Culture and France Inter. He has been the recipient of the following prizes: the Prix Wepler, the Prix SACD Nouveau Talent Radio in 2007, the Grand prix de la fiction radiophonique de la SGDL in 2008, the Prix du deuxième roman, the Prix Rhône-Alpes, and the Prix meilleure page 111.

== Works ==
=== Books ===
- Veuves au maquillage, Éditions Verticales, 2000; Points Seuil. Prix Rhône-Alpes
- Essais fragiles d’aplomb (essay), Verticales, coll. Minimales, 2002
- Ruines-de-Rome, Verticales, 2002; Points Seuil. Prix du deuxième roman 2003
- La réfutation majeure : version française, d'après Réfutatio major, attribué à Antonio de Guevara (1480-1548), Verticales, 2004, (Gallimard, Folio 4647, 2007)
  - The Major Refutation: English version of Refutatio major, attributed to Antonio de Guevara (1480–1545), translated by Jacob Siefring, Contra Mundum Press, Dec 2016
- Géométrie dans la poussière, illustrations by Patrice Killoffer, Verticales, 2004
  - Geometry in the Dust, illustrations by Patrice Killoffer, translated by Jacob Siefring, Inside the Castle, Apr 2019
- L’idiot et les hommes de paroles (essai), Bayard, 2005
- Sort l'assassin, entre le spectre, Verticales, 2006
- Fragments de Lichtenberg, Verticales, 2008
  - Fragments of Lichtenberg, translated by Gregory Flanders, Dalkey Archive Press, Jan 2017
- Les carnets de Gordon McGuffin, illustrated by Nicolas de Crécy, Futuropolis, 2008.
- Les aventures de Percival : un conte phylogénétique, illustrated by Nicolas de Crécy, Dis voir, 2009
  - The Adventures of Percival: A Phylogenetic Tale, translated by Paul Buck and Catherine Petit, Dis voir, 2009
- Etudes de silhouettes, Verticales, March 2010
  - Studies of Silhouettes, trans. Jacob Siefring, Sublunary Editions, Nov 2020
- Environs et mesures, Gallimard, « Le Cabinet des lettrés », April 2011
- Falstaff : apothéose (essay), 2012
  - Falstaff: Apotheosis, trans. Jacob Siefring, Sublunary Editions, 2019
- Zoophile contant fleurette, Cadex, April 2012
- Achab (séquelles), Verticales, August 2015
  - Ahab (Sequels), trans. Jacob Siefring & Tegan Raleigh, Contra Mundum, Nov 2021
- Cendres des hommes et des bulletins, illustrated by Sergio Aquindo, Le Tripode, September 2016
- Projectiles au sens propre, Verticales, January 2020
- Rabelais's Doughnuts: Selected Short Writings, trans. Jacob Siefring, Sublunary Editions, February 2022
- Épître aux wisigoths, Éditions José Corti, 2023
- Un long silence interrompu par le cri d'un griffon, Verticales, 2023

=== Selected radio plays ===
- Un immense fil d’une heure de temps, directed by Marguerie Gateau, 2007
- Histoire de Bouvard et Pécuchet, copistes, adaption of the book by Gustave Flaubert, with Dominique Pinon and Philippe Magnan, directed by Jean-Matthieu Zahnd, 2009
- Proxima du Centaure (Radio fiction pamphlet), Lansman, March 2010
- Les Évasions de Boris Anacrouse, directed by Alexandre Plank, 2010
- Rumeurs autour d'une Encyclopédie du silence, directed by Laure Egoroff, 2012
- Le Discret et le Continu, directed by Jean-Matthieu Zahnd, 2016
- La Maison Winchester, directed by Jean-Matthieu Zahnd, 2017
- Comment faire disparaître une ombre, directed by Jean-Matthieu Zahnd, 2019

== Awards and honors ==
- 2000: Prix Rhône-Alpes, for Veuves au maquillage
- 2003: Prix du deuxième roman, for Ruines-de-Rome
- 2007: Prix SACD Nouveau Talent Radio
- 2008: Grand prix de la fiction radiophonique de la SGDL, for Un immense fil d'une heure de temps
- 2015: Prix Wepler-Fondation La Poste, for Achab (séquelles)
- 2015: Prix de la Page 111, for Achab (séquelles)
