= Sophie Divry =

French writer (born 1979)

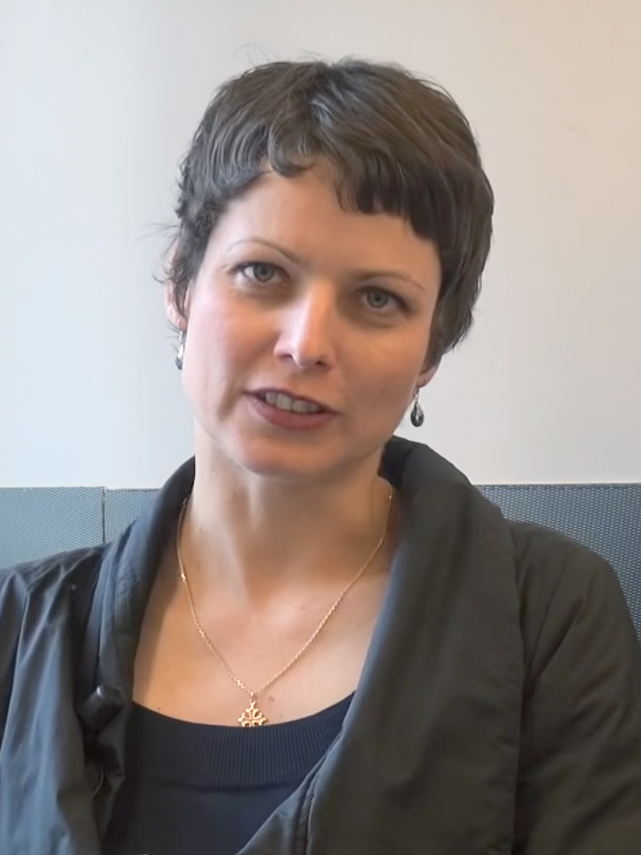
Divry in 2015

Sophie Divry (born 1979) is a French writer.

From 2004 to 2010, she was a journalist at the monthly La Décroissance. Since 2016, she has been a participant on the radio program Des Papous dans la tête on France Culture.

== Works ==
- 2010: La Cote 400, Montréal-Paris, Canada-France, Éditions Les Allusifs, 64 p. ISBN 978-2-923682-13-6 - rééd. 10/18, 2013.

- translated into English under the title The Library of Unrequited Love, by Siân Reynolds ISBN 978-1-78087-051-9
- Also translated into Castilian, Catalan, Swedish, Italian and Persian.

- 2013: Journal d’un recommencement, Lausanne, Switzerland, Éditions Noir sur Blanc, series "Notabilia", 80 p. ISBN 978-2-88250-306-0
- 2014: La Condition pavillonnaire, Lausanne, Éditions Noir sur Blanc, series "Notabilia", 262 p. ISBN 978-2-88250-347-3.

- Prix Wepler 2014 (Mention Spéciale).

- translated into English under the title Madame Bovary of the Suburbs, by Alison Anderson. ISBN 978-0857054685

- 2015: Quand le diable sortit de la salle de bain, Lausanne, Suisse, Éditions Noir sur Blanc, series "Notabilia", 144 p. ISBN 978-2-88250-384-8

- translated into Spanish under the title Cuando le diablo salio del bano, by Maria Enguix ISBN 978-84-16420-64-3
- Prix Trop Virilo 2015.
