= Florence Delaporte =

French writer and translator (born 1959)

Florence Delaporte (born in 1959) is a French writer and translator.

== Works ==
- 1996: Sœur Sourire. Brûlée aux feux de la rampe , Paris, Plon, 244 p. ISBN 2-259-18412-X
- 1998: Je n’ai pas de château, Paris, Éditions Gallimard, Collection Blanche, 177 p. ISBN 2-07-075282-8

- Prix Wepler 1998

- 2001: Le Poisson dans l’arbre, Éditions Gallimard, series "Haute Enfance", 184 p. ISBN 2-07-076104-5
- 2002: Les enfants qui tombent dans la mer, Éditions Gallimard, Collection Blanche, 271 p. ISBN 2-07-076664-0
- 2005: La Chambre des machines, Éditions Gallimard Collection Blanche, 152 p. ISBN 978-2-07-012860-0
- 2016: Deux livres de chair, François Bourin Éditeur, 282 p. ISBN 979-10-2520-164-0

=== Children's literature ===
- 2012: À quoi rêve Crusoé ?, Rodez, Éditions du Rouergue, series "Dacodac", 119 p. ISBN 978-2-8126-0446-1
- 2013: Amour ennemi, Paris, Éditions Oskar, 133 p. ISBN 979-10-214-0007-8
