= Richard Morgiève =

Richard Morgiève is a French writer, playwright, screenwriter, and actor.

== Awards and honors ==
- 1993 : prix Point de Mire for Fausto
- 1994 : prix Joseph Delteil for Fausto
- 2000 : mention spéciale du prix Wepler - Fondation La Poste for Ma vie folle (Pauvert)
- 2005 : prix Wepler - Fondation La Poste for Vertig (Denoël)
- 2007 : prix littéraire des Rencontres du livre d'Histoire de Courbevoie for Un petit homme de dos (Joëlle Losfeld)
- 2007 : prix d'interprétation au Festival du court-métrage d'humour de Meudon for his role in Le Mozart des pickpockets, de Philippe Pollet-Villard
- 2018 : prix du Printemps du roman for Les Hommes
- 2019 : grand prix de littérature policière for Le Cherokee
- 2020 : prix Mystère de la critique for Le Cherokee
- 2023 :
  - Prix Georges Brassens for La fête des mères
  - Finaliste Prix Médicis for La fête des mères

== Publications ==
=== Detective novels ===
- 1980 : Allez les Verts, Éditions Sanguine
- 1981 : Branqu'à part, Éditions Sanguine
- 1982 : Sympathies pour le diable, Albin Michel ISBN 2-226-01574-4
- 1982 : Chrysler 66, Albin Michel Sanguine 2^{e} série No. 1 ISBN 2-226-01439-X
- 1983 : Gare indienne de la paix, Engrenage No. 79 Fleuve noir ISBN 2-265-02484-8

=== Novels ===
- 1987 : Des femmes et des boulons, RamsayISBN 2-85956-562-0
- 1988 : Un petit homme de dos, Ramsay ISBN 2-85956-722-4, réédité chez Joëlle Losfeld en 1994 et 2007 (collection Arcanes)
  Prix des rencontres du livre d'histoire de Courbevoie 2007
- 1990 : Fausto, éditions Robert Laffont ISBN 2-221-07691-5
  Prix Point de Mire 1993 - Prix Joseph Delteil 1994 - adapté au cinéma en 1993 : Fausto, de Rémy Duchemin, dont il est coscénariste
- 1993 : Andrée, Éditions Robert Laffont ISBN 2-221-07683-4
- 1994 : Cueille le jour, éditions Robert Laffont ISBN 2-221-07828-4
- 1995 : Sex vox dominam, Calmann-Lévy ISBN 2-7021-2492-5
- 1996 : Mon beau Jacky, Calmann-Lévy ISBN 2-7021-2628-6
- 1997 : Legarçon, Calmann-Lévy ISBN 2-7021-2749-5
- 2000 : Ma vie folle, éditions Pauvert ISBN 2-7202-1403-5
  Mention spéciale Prix Wepler 2000
- 2000 : Ton corps, Éditions Pauvert ISBN 2-7202-1409-4
- 2001 : Deux mille capotes à l'heure, Éditions Pauvert ISBN 2-84261-278-7
- 2002 : Mon petit garçon, Joëlle Losfeld ISBN 2-84412-112-8 réédition en novembre 2019 Joëlle Losfeld ISBN 978-2-84412-112-7
  adapté en spectacle par l'auteur en 2005 : voir section Adaptations de ses œuvres.
- 2002 : Ce que Dieu et les anges, Éditions Pauvert ISBN 2-7202-1477-9
- 2004 : Full of love, Denoël ISBN 2-207-25466-6
- 2005 : Vertig, Denoël ISBN 2-207-25581-6
  Prix Wepler 2005
- 2007 : Miracles et légendes de mon pays en guerre, Denoël ISBN 978-2-207-25948-1
- 2009 : Cheval, Denoël ISBN 978-2-207-26110-1
- 2010 : Mouton, Carnets nord ISBN 978-2-355-36038-1
- Trilogie :
  - 2012 : United Colors of Crime, Carnets nord ISBN 978-2-35536-053-4
  - 2014 : Boy, Carnets nord ISBN 978-2-35536-118-0
  - 2015 : Love, Carnets nord ISBN 978-2-35536-157-9
    - Intégrale : 2017 : La Trilogie, avec une préface inédite de l'auteur Je ne suis pas moi Carnets nord ISBN 978-2-355362521
- 2015 : Martyrium, La Dragonne ISBN 978-2-913465-91-6
- 2015 : Le fête des mères sous le pseudonyme de Jacques Bauchot, Carnets nord ISBN 978-2355361708
- 2017 : Les Hommes · , Joëlle Losfeld ISBN 978-2-07-273174-7
- 2019 : Le Cherokee, Joëlle Losfeld ISBN 978-2-07-282932-1
  Grand prix de littérature policière 2019 et prix Mystère de la critique 2020 - Réédition, Gallimard, coll. Folio policier No. 919, 2020 ISBN 978-2-913465-91-6
- 2021 : Cimetière d'étoiles · , Joëlle Losfeld ISBN 978-2-07-282932-1
  Réédition, Gallimard, coll. Folio policier No. 948, 2022 ISBN 978-2-07-296487-9
- 2023 : La Fête des mères, Gallimard, coll. Joëlle Losfeld ISBN 978-2-07-302757-3 Prix Georges Brassens 2023

=== Theatre ===
- 2000 : Tout un oiseau, Éditions Pauvert ISBN 2-7202-1390-X
  Pièce mise en scène en 2002 : voir section Adaptations de ses œuvres.
- 2001 : La Demoiselle aux crottes de nez, Joëlle Losfeld ISBN 2-84412-102-0
  Pièce mise en scène en 2003 : voir section Adaptations de ses œuvres.
- 2005 : Mondial cafard, Joëlle Losfeld ISBN 2-07-078956-X

=== Children's literature ===
- 2000 : Bébé-Jo, illustrations de Gianpaolo Pagni, Joëlle Losfeld ISBN 2-84412-039-3

=== Articles ===
- « Le Silence », La Nouvelle Revue française, No. 627, p. 32-41, novembre 2017.ISBN 9782072755743
- « Alice Massat : Le ministère de l'intérieur », La Femelle du Requin , No. 50, p. 120-121, Janvier 2019.ISBN 9782912317506
- « À quoi bon la littérature dans un monde d'images ? on a besoin d'histoires », Papiers, No. 28, p. 72, avril-juin 2019.ISBN 9782912969958

=== Collections ===
- 2001 : Un cavalier de dos, in Histoire de lecture, Ministère de la Culture et de la Communication ISBN 2-907005-12-X
- 2002 : Intérieur-extérieur, in Les mots des autres, FRMK ISBN 2-911842-83-9
- 2002 : Contre Offensive, éditions Pauvert ISBN 2-7202-1481-7
- 2002 : Notre pensée est-elle prisonnière de la langue que nous parlons ?, in Anti-annales de philosophie, Bréal ISBN 2-84291-987-4
- 2004 : Pendant que les enfants jouent, in Tout sera comme avant, Verticales ISBN 2-84335-198-7, d'après l'album éponyme de Dominique A
- 2018 : Le Jumeau solitaire, in La revue - 40 récits et fictions courtes, Le serpent à plumes ISBN 979-1-09-739071-6
