= Titaua Peu =

Tahitian writer (born 1975)

- Born: 1975 (age 50–51)
- Occupation: Novelist
- Language: French
- Notable works: Mutismes: E 'ore te vāvā (2003); Pina (2016)

Titaua Peu (born 1975) is a Tahitian novelist. Her two French-language novels both explore themes of colonialism, violence and intergenerational trauma in Polynesian life. Her first novel, published in 2003, made her the youngest published Tahitian writer; her second received several notable awards and was published in English in the United States in 2022. The Times Literary Supplement has called her work "an essential starting point for those interested in Tahiti and indigenous writers from the contemporary Pacific".

== Background and Mūtismes ==
Peu was born in New Caledonia in 1975 to a Polynesian family. Her family moved to Tahiti where she graduated from the Lycée Paul-Gauguin in 1994. After spending time in Paris studying philosophy, she returned to Tahiti in 2002 where she worked in journalism and communications before becoming a general manager in the municipality of Pāʻea.

Her first novel, Mutismes: E 'ore te vāvā, published in 2003, was about the impacts of French colonialism in Polynesia, including the effects of nuclear testing at Moruroa and ongoing domestic violence. While written in French, the title is bilingual: "mutismes" is the French plural noun for "mutism", while "E 'ore te vāvā" means "no more continuing muteness" in the Tahitian language. It was dedicated to Tahitian independence leader Pouvanaa a Oopa.

At the time Peu was the youngest-ever published Tahitian writer, at age 28. Anaïs Maurer writing in The Contemporary Pacific notes that it "was the first novel to denounce the double oppression faced by [Tahitian] women in a patriarchal and colonial society". Mūtismes caused some scandal due to its political and antinuclear stance, and Peu has said she received threatening letters. However, Moetai Brotherson and others praised her work as a landmark for indigenous literature. It was republished in 2021.

Peu has said her writing is inspired by Toni Morrison, and by the darkness of the works of Victor Hugo, Arthur Rimbaud and Michel Houellebecq. In addition to her novels, she has had a number of works published in the Littérama'ohi literary magazine since 2003.

== Pina and later career ==
Peu's second novel Pina was published in 2016. It received the 2017 Eugène Dabit Prize and the 2019 French Voices Grand Prize in Fiction, awarded by the French Embassy in the United States. It was also shortlisted for the Grand prix du roman métis. It was translated into English by Jeffrey Zuckerman and published in the United States in 2022, together with an introduction by Rajiv Mohabir.

On the strength of Pina, Radio New Zealand called Peu "one of the principal French speaking writers of the Pacific". It described the novel as "raw yet tender portrayal of life for a large Tahitian family in Papeʻete, where intergenerational trauma manifests in violence, alcohol and other abuse". The Times Literary Supplement called her work "an essential starting point for those interested in Tahiti and indigenous writers from the contemporary Pacific".

The New York Times said that Pina is "a clamorous, at times unwieldy take on modern Tahiti, yet Peu's 'rough-hewn, oral, humane prose' (in the words of the translator, Jeffrey Zuckerman) rings fiercely true". The Woven Tale Press noted that Peu offers "a disturbing portrait of colonialism's lasting footprint" in Tahiti: "The keen manner in which Peu braids the strands of colonization, alcoholism, and domestic violence is nothing short of amazing". Kiran Bhat, reviewing the novel for Asymptote, praised Peu's "stylistic risk-taking" and innovative writing. He concluded:

A postmodern and polyphonic take on the coming-of-age novel, Pina makes for great reading for fans of Catcher in the Rye or Jane Eyre looking for more nuanced female perspectives, an inquisitive exploration of sexuality in a marginalized part of the world, and an astute awareness of how geographical and class differences fit into the larger tableau of global exploitation and oppression.

Since Pina, Peu has held the L'association Rhizomes writers' residency in Douarnenez (2023) and the Randell Cottage Writers' Residency in Wellington, New Zealand (2025).

== Selected works ==
- Mutismes: E 'ore te vāvā (Haere Po, 2003; new edition published by Au Vent des îles, 2021)
- Pina (Au Vent des îles, 2016); also published in the United States (Restless Books, 2022) with an English translation by Jeffrey Zuckerman
