= Roger Faligot =

French journalist

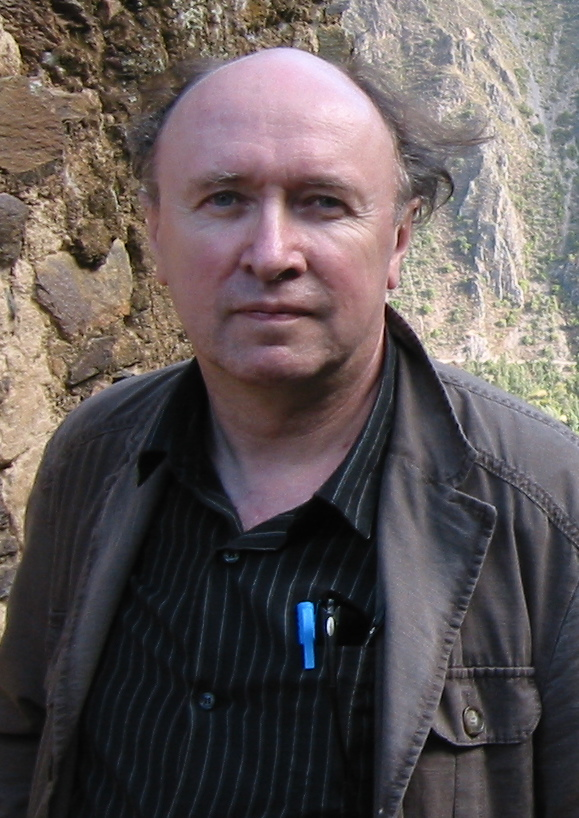
Roger Faligot in 2009.

Roger Faligot is a French journalist, who started covering The Troubles in Northern Ireland in 1973 before becoming a freelance investigative journalist for British, Parisian and foreign newspapers and magazines (Ireland, England, Japan). Considered one of the best French specialists on Ireland, he was special correspondent of the weekly The European, based in London, for seven years in the 1990s. Faligot presided over the Association des journalistes bretons et des pays celtiques from 1993 to 2000.

Starting in 1977, he wrote, alone or with co-authors, more than 30 books concerning contemporary history, espionage, etc. He speaks many languages, among which Chinese.

== Bibliography ==
- La résistance irlandaise, 1916-1976, Paris : Maspéro, 1977
- Guerre spéciale en Europe, Paris : Flammarion, 1980
- Nous avons tué Mountbatten ! L'IRA parle, témoignages recueillis par Roger Faligot, Paris : Picollec, 1981
- Bloc H ou la Ballade de Colm Brady, Lyon : Jacques-Marie Laffont, 1981
- Constance Markievicz, in : Des femmes dans le monde (collectif), Paris : Messidor-Temps Actuels, 1982
- Les services spéciaux de sa majesté, Paris : Messidor, Temps actuels, 1982
- Au cœur de l'État, l'espionnage. Autrement, 1983, with Rémi Kauffer.
- Markus, espion allemand. Messidor, 1984.
- Service B. Le reseau d'espionnage le plus secret de la Seconde guerre mondiale. Fayard, 1985
- La Piscine. Les Services Secrets Français, 1944-1984. Seuil, 1985, with Pascal Krop.
- Kang Sheng et les Services Secrets chinois (1927–1987).Editions Robert Laffont, 1987, with Rémi Kauffer.
- Les résistants : de la guerre de l'ombre aux allées du pouvoir 1944-1989. Fayard, 1989, with Rémi Kauffer.
- As tu vu Jean Cremet?. Fayard, 1991, with Rémi Kauffer.
- Eminences grises Fayard, 1992, with Rémi Kauffer.
- La résistance irlandaise, 1916-1992, Rennes : Terre de Brume, 1992
- Histoire mondiale du renseignement. Laffont, 1993, with Rémi Kauffer.
- La harpe et l'hermine, Rennes : Terre de brume, 1994.
- Le marché du Diable. Fayard, 1995, with Rémi Kauffer.
- L’Empire invisible; les mafias chinoises, Philippe Picquier, 1996
- Naisho. Enquête au cœur des services secrets japonais. La Découverte, 1997.
- BZH, des Bretons, des Bretagnes, documentaire retraçant l’histoire du Mouvement breton, d’hier à aujourd’hui, with Olivier Bourbeillon and Marie Hélia. 1997.
- Porno business. Fayard, 1998, with Rémi Kauffer.
- James Connolly et le mouvement révolutionnaire irlandais, Rennes : Terre de Brume, 1999.
- DST police secrète, Flammarion, 1999, with Pascal Krop.
- La résistance irlandaise, 1916-2000, Rennes : Terre de Brume, 1999
- Le Croissant et la croix gammée : Les Secrets de l'alliance entre l'Islam et le nazisme d'Hitler à nos jours. Albin Michel. 2000, with Rémi Kauffer.
- La Mafia Chinoise En Europe. Calmann-Lévy, 2001
- Le peuple des enfants, Paris : Seuil, 2004
- L'Hermine rouge de Shanghai. Les Portes du Large, 2004, with Rémi Kauffer.
- Les seigneurs de la paix, Editions du Seuil, 2006
- Histoire secrète de la Ve République, Editions La Découverte 2006, with Jean Guisnel.
- Les mystères d'Irlande, (Irish Mysteries) Yoran Embanner publishers, 2007, a paperback selection of thirty years of reporting on Irish affairs.
- Les services secrets chinois, de Mao aux JO (The Chinese Secret Service, from Mao to the Olympic Games), Nouveau Monde publishers, Paris, 2008. A 600-page investigative report on Chinese intelligence and their activities from the 1920s, especially the Guoanbu.
