= Antoine Volodine =

Pseudonym of a Russian-French writer

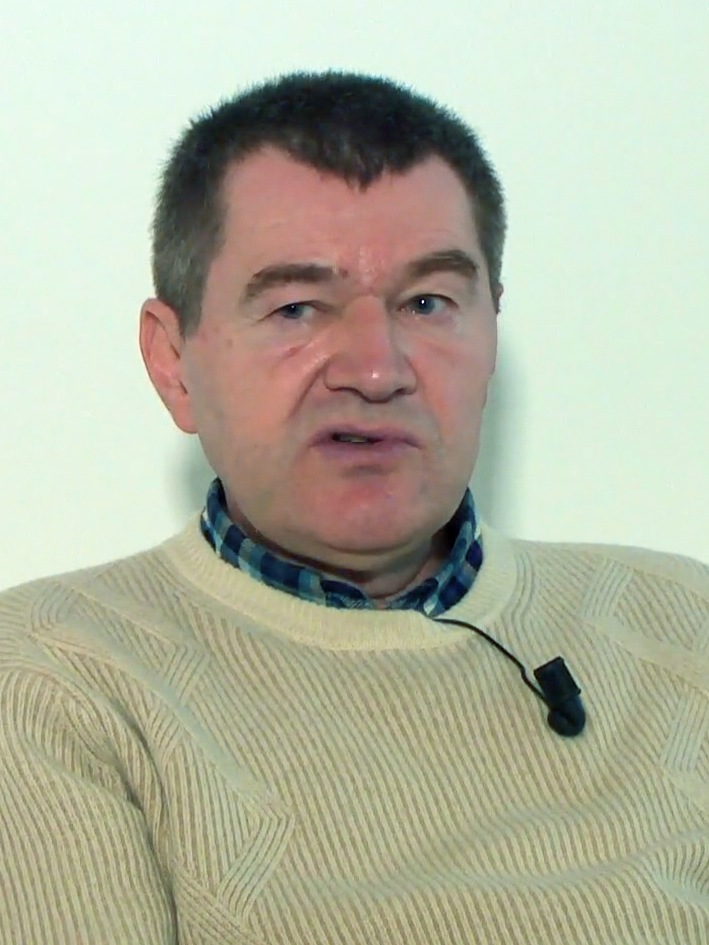
- Volodine in 2014
- Born: 1950 (age 75–76)
- Occupation: Writer
- Writing career
- Notable awards: Grand Prix de l'Imaginaire (1987); Prix Wepler (1999); Prix du Livre Inter (2000); Prix Médicis (2014)

Jean Desvignes (born 1950) is a French writer, best known under the pen name Antoine Volodine, as well as Elli Kronauer, Manuela Draeger, Lutz Bassmann and Infernus Iohannes.

== Writing ==
He initially was interested in the original Association des Écrivains et Artistes Révolutionnaires. His works often involve cataclysms and have scenes of interrogations. He won the Grand Prix de l'Imaginaire in 1987. Des anges mineurs (Minor Angels), one of his best-known works, won the Prix du Livre Inter and Prix Wepler. He won the Prix Médicis in 2014 for Terminus radieux (Radiant Terminus).

He has also translated literary works from Russian into French, including such authors as Eduard Limonov, Arkady and Boris Strugatsky, Viktoriya Tokareva, Alexander Ikonnikov, and Maria Sudayeva (who may be another pseudonym of Volodine's).

== Selected bibliography of English translations ==
=== As Antoine Volodine ===
- Alto solo (1991). Solo Viola, translated by Lia Swope Mitchell (University of Minnesota Press, 2021)
- Le Nom des singes (1994). Naming the Jungle, translated by Linda Coverdale (The New Press, 1995)
- Le Port intérieur (1996). The Inner Harbour, translated by Gina Stamm (University of Minnesota Press, 2025)
- Le Post-exotisme en dix leçons, leçon onze (1998). Post-Exoticism in Ten Lessons, Lesson Eleven, translated by J.T. Mahany (Open Letter, 2015)
- Des anges mineurs (1999). Minor Angels, translated by Jordan Stump (University of Nebraska Press, 2004)
- Bardo or not bardo (2004). Bardo or Not Bardo, translated by J.T. Mahany (Open Letter, 2016)
- Songes de Mevlido (2007). Mevlido's Dreams, translated by Gina Stamm (University of Minnesota Press, 2024)
- Écrivains (2010). Writers, translated by Katina Rogers (Dalkey Archive, 2014)
- Terminus radieux (2014). Radiant Terminus, translated by Jeffrey Zuckerman (Open Letter, 2017)
- Les Filles de Monroe (2021). The Monroe Girls, translated by Alyson Waters (Archipelago Books, 2026)

=== As Manuela Draeger ===
- Pendant la boule bleue (2002). In the Time of the Blue Ball, translated by Brian Evenson with Valerie Evenson (Dorothy, 2011). Contains "In the Time of the Blue Ball" (2002), "North of the Wolverines" (2002), and "Our Baby Pelicans" (2003).
- La Course au kwak (2004). "The Kwak Race," translated by Brian Evenson in The Baffler, 2024.
- L'Arrestation de la grande Mimille (2007). "The Arrest of the Great Mimille," translated by Valerie Mariana and Brian Evenson in The Big Book of Modern Fantasy, ed. Ann VanderMeer and Jeff VanderMeer
- Belle-Méduse (2008). "Belle-Medusa," translated by Valerie Evenson and Brian Evenson in xo Orpheus: Fifty New Myths, ed. Kate Bernheimer
- Onze Rêves de suie (2010). Eleven Sooty Dreams, translated by J.T. Mahany (Open Letter, 2021)
- Kree (2020). Kree, translated by Lia Swope Mitchell (University of Minnesota Press, 2024)

=== As Lutz Bassmann ===
- Avec les moines-soldats (2008). We Monks & Soldiers, translated by Jordan Stump (University of Nebraska Press, 2012)
- Black Village (2017). Black Village, translated by Jeffrey Zuckerman (Open Letter, 2022)

== Awards and honours ==
- 1987: Grand prix de l'Imaginaire for Rituel du mépris
- 1999: Prix Wepler for Des anges mineurs
- 2000: Prix du Livre Inter for Des anges mineurs
- 2014: Prix Médicis for Terminus radieux
- 2014: Prix de la Page 111 for Terminus radieux
- 2017: Albertine Prize for Bardo or not Bardo
