= Chinese Communist Espionage =

Book by Peter Mattis and Matthew Brazil

Chinese Communist Espionage: An Intelligence Primer
- Author: Peter L. Mattis, Matthew J. Brazil
- Language: English
- Subjects: China and the Asia Pacific, Espionage & Intelligence
- Publisher: Naval Institute Press
- Publication date: November 15, 2019
- Publication place: United States
- Pages: 376
- ISBN: 9781682473030 (hardcover)
- OCLC: 1117319580
- LC Class: 2019020106
- Website: www.ccpintelterms.com

Chinese Communist Espionage: An Intelligence Primer is a 2019 book by Peter Mattis and Matthew Brazil which examines the history of intelligence collection, analysis, and exploitation since the founding of the People's Republic of China.

== Details ==
Published by Naval Institute Press, the book is part history, part biographical series, with the latter half of the book consisting of dozens of short vignettes on key figures and episodes in Chinese intelligence history unknown to most in the west. The book is up front about the relative confidence of the authors in different sources, but avoids synthesis in favor of allowing the reader to draw their own conclusions regarding the Chinese intelligence services, their activities and methods. It is divided by chapter into distinct topic areas: “Chinese Communist Intelligence Organizations,” “Chinese Communist Intelligence Leaders,” “Notable Spies of the Chinese Revolution and the Early PRC,” “Economic Espionage Cases,” “Espionage during the Revolution and the Early People’s Republic,” “Espionage during China’s Rise,” and “Intelligence and Surveillance in China, Then and Now.”

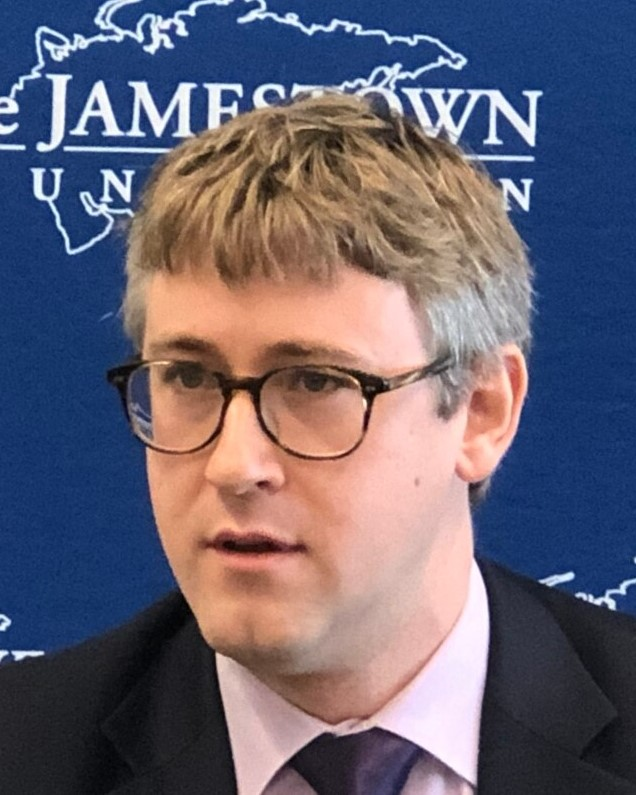
Peter Mattis, one of the two authors

The book has earned some notoriety for underscoring the brutality of China's intelligence services by beginning with a grim retelling of a 2011 public execution of an Ministry of State Security (MSS) officer and his pregnant wife in the courtyard of the agency's headquarters in Beijing. The officer was alleged to be a double agent for the CIA, and all employees of the agency were reportedly required to attend as a deterrent.

== Reception ==
The book debuted to mostly positive reviews, with Michael Auslin's review for The Wall Street Journal describing it as "the most comprehensive attempt yet to outline the range of China’s spying." The Economist described the book as "a useful field guide to Chinese intelligence services and ... an eye-opening compendium of confirmed cases of Chinese skullduggery," but reminded readers that "charting the Chinese threat remains a work in progress." Nigel West described the book as "far from a comprehensive analysis of the subject", complaining that the authors did not reveal "specialist insider knowledge" they were privy to in a professional capacity as employees of the US government bound by the Espionage Act.

The book was made the topic of a broadcast discussion from the Center for Strategic and International Studies (CSIS).
