= Jakuta Alikavazovic =

French woman of letters (born 1979)

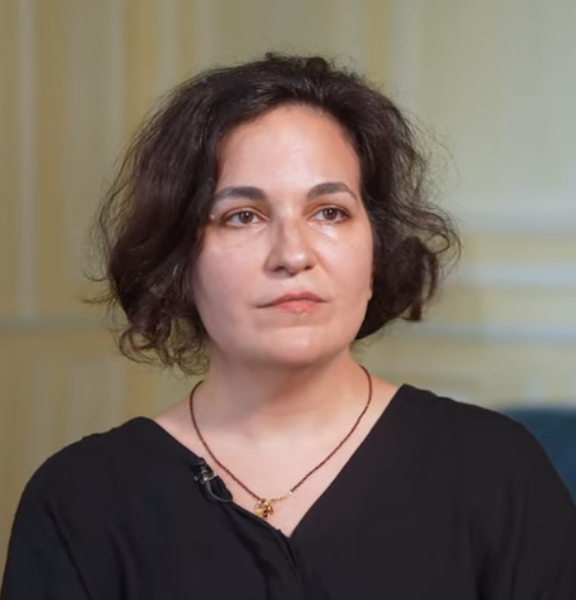
- In a 2025 interview
- Born: 6 October 1979 (age 46); Paris, France
- Education: École normale supérieure Paris-Saclay
- Occupation: Writer

Jakuta Alikavazovic (born 6 October 1979) is a French writer. Her debut novel Corps volatils was awarded the prix Goncourt du premier roman. In 2021, her latest novel Night As It Falls was published in the United Kingdom by Faber and Faber.

== Biography ==
A former student of the École normale supérieure Paris-Saclay, she holds an agrégation de Lettres degree.

In 2010, her second novel Le Londres-Louxor received a very enthusiastic welcome from the press and found itself in the selection of the Prix du Livre Inter. In 2012, she published La Blonde et le Bunker, which won the special mention of the jury of the Prix Wepler. Her fourth novel L'avancée de la nuit, published in 2017, was shortlisted for Le Monde's literary prize, the Prix Médicis, the Prix Femina and the Prix du Livre Inter. She won the 2021 Prix Médicis essai for Comme un ciel en nous.

Her books are translated into English, Italian, German and Chinese.

She has a monthly column in the national daily newspaper Libération. Her work has been published in Granta, Nouvelle Revue Française and El Malpensante.

She also wrote three books for children published by L'École des loisirs and has translated several books from English including works from David Foster Wallace, Anna Burns and Ben Lerner.

== Work ==
=== Novels ===
- 2007: Corps volatils, Éditions de l'Olivier
- 2010: Le Londres-Louxor, Éditions de l'Olivier
- 2012: La Blonde et le Bunker, Éditions de l'Olivier
- 2017: L'avancée de la nuit, Éditions de l'Olivier / Night As It Falls, Faber & Faber

=== Short stories ===
- 2006: Histoires contre nature, Éditions de l'Olivier
- 2008: Romeo y Julieta (un cratère), Éditions de l'atelier In 8°

=== Journals and collective works ===
- 2013: "La mémoire des visages", Assises du Roman, Christian Bourgois/Villa Gillet/Le Monde
- 2013: "Nocturne", Nouvelle Revue Française n° 606, Gallimard
- 2014: "Risques et périls", Devenirs du Roman (vol.2), Éditions Inculte
- 2015: "Nos visages", Nouvelle Revue française n^{o} 613, Éditions Gallimard
- 2017: "Des larmes", Nouvelle Revue française n^{o} 623, Éditions Gallimard
- 2019: "À propos de certains types de circuits", Nouvelle Revue française, n^{o} 636, Éditions Gallimard

=== Books for children ===
- 2004: Holmes et moi, L'École des loisirs
- 2004: Leçon d'équilibrisme n°1, L'École des loisirs
- 2012: Irina vs Irina, L'École des loisirs

== Prizes and distinctions ==
- In 2007, Jakuta Alikavazovic was a laureate of the "Bourse du Talent écrivain" of the Jean-Luc Lagardère foundation
- In 2008, her novel Corps volatils was distinguished the Prix Goncourt du Premier Roman
- In 2012, La Blonde et le Bunker received the Mention Spéciale du jury of the Prix Wepler
- In 2013 and 2014, Jakuta Alikavazovic was a resident at the Villa Médicis in Rome
- In 2017, her novel L'avancée de la nuit was awarded the Prix du Zorba, the Prix Castel du Roman de la Nuit
