= Noémi Lefebvre =

French writer (born 1964)

Noémi Lefebvre (born 1964) is a French writer. She studied music and politics, eventually becoming a political scientist at the Instituts d'études politiques of Grenoble II. She has written several books, among them L’autoportrait bleu (2009), her debut novel which has been translated into English by Sophie Lewis; L'état des sentiments à l'âge adulte (2012); L’enfance politique (2015) and Poétique de l'emploi (2018).

She was born in Caen and lives in Lyon.

== Bibliography ==
=== Novels ===
- Lefebvre, Noémi (2021). Poetics at work. Translated by Sophie Lewis. Transit Books. (Note: Briefly reviewed in the March 29, 2021 issue of The New Yorker, p.69.)

———————

Bibliography notes
