= Nathalie Léger =

French writer

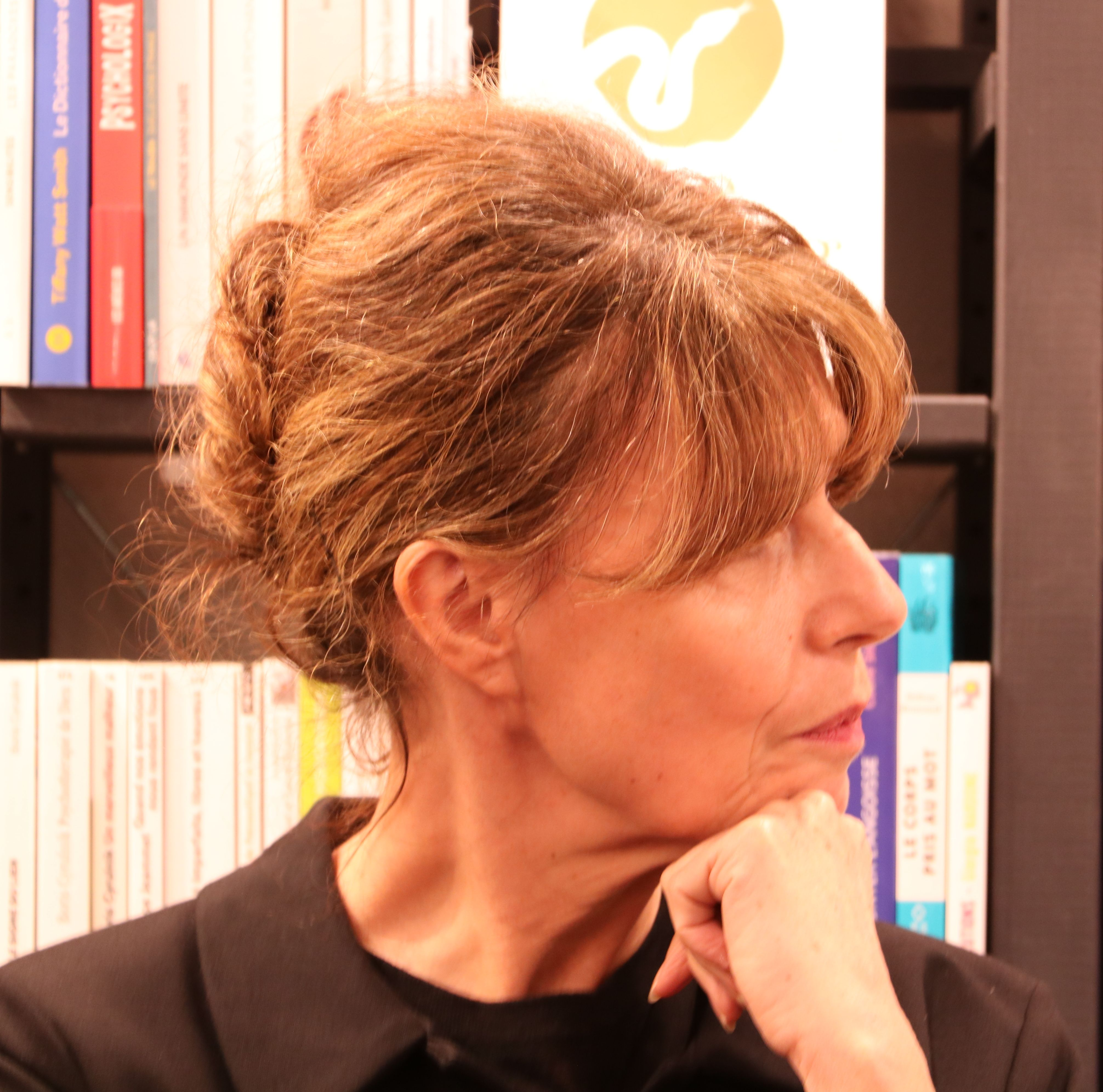
- A profile portrait of Léger during a film festival in Poitiers, 2020
- Born: 1960 (age 65–66); Paris, Seine, French Fifth Republic
- Writing career
- Language: French
- Years active: 2006-present
- Notable work: Suite for Barbara Loden
- Notable awards: Prix du Livre Inter; Prix Wepler; Prix France Culture/Télérama
- Website: Nathalie Leger on Instagram

Nathalie Léger (born 1960 in Paris, France) is a writer and the executive director of the Institute for Contemporary Publishing Archives (IMEC).

== Career ==
Léger has been the curator of several exhibitions, notably Le Jeu et la Raison, dedicated to Antoine Vitez (Festival d'Avignon, 1994), L'Auteur et son éditeur (IMEC, 1998) and the exhibition Roland Barthes, which was held at the Centre Georges-Pompidou in 2002, and in 2007, the exhibition Samuel Beckett, in the same place. She directed the five-volume edition of the Écrits sur le théâtre by Antoine Vitez (Éditions P.O.L 1994–98) and established, annotated and presented that of the last two courses of Roland Barthes at the Collège de France La Préparation du roman (Seuil-IMEC, 2002).

She is the author of a personal essay entitled Les Vies silencieuses de Samuel Beckett (Éditions Allia, 2006).

Between 2008 and 2018, she published a conceptual trilogy about the lives of women. The first, L'Exposition (Exposition) (2008), was about the Countess of Castiglione and won the Prix Lavinal Printemps des lecteurs in 2009. In 2012, she published Supplément à la vie de Barbara Loden (Suite for Barbara Loden), devoted to the American actress and director Barbara Loden. Since its publication, the book has been critically very successful and was awarded the Prix du Livre Inter on 4 June 2012. In 2018, she published La Robe blanche (The White Dress), about Pippa Bacca.

== Bibliography ==
- Les Vies silencieuses de Samuel Beckett (2006, Allia).
- L'Exposition (2008, Éditions P.O.L). Exposition, trans. Amanda de Marco (2019).
- Supplément à la vie de Barbara Loden (2012, Éditions P.O.L). Suite for Barbara Loden, trans. Natasha Lehrer and Cécile Menon (2015).
- La Robe blanche (2018, Éditions P.O.L). The White Dress, trans. Natasha Lehrer (2020).
- Suivant l'azur (2020, Éditions P.O.L).

== Awards and honours ==
- 2009: Prix Lavinal Printemps des lecteurs for L'Exposition
- 2012: Prix du Livre Inter for Supplément à la vie de Barbara Loden
