= Neige Sinno =

French novelist and memoirist (born 1977)

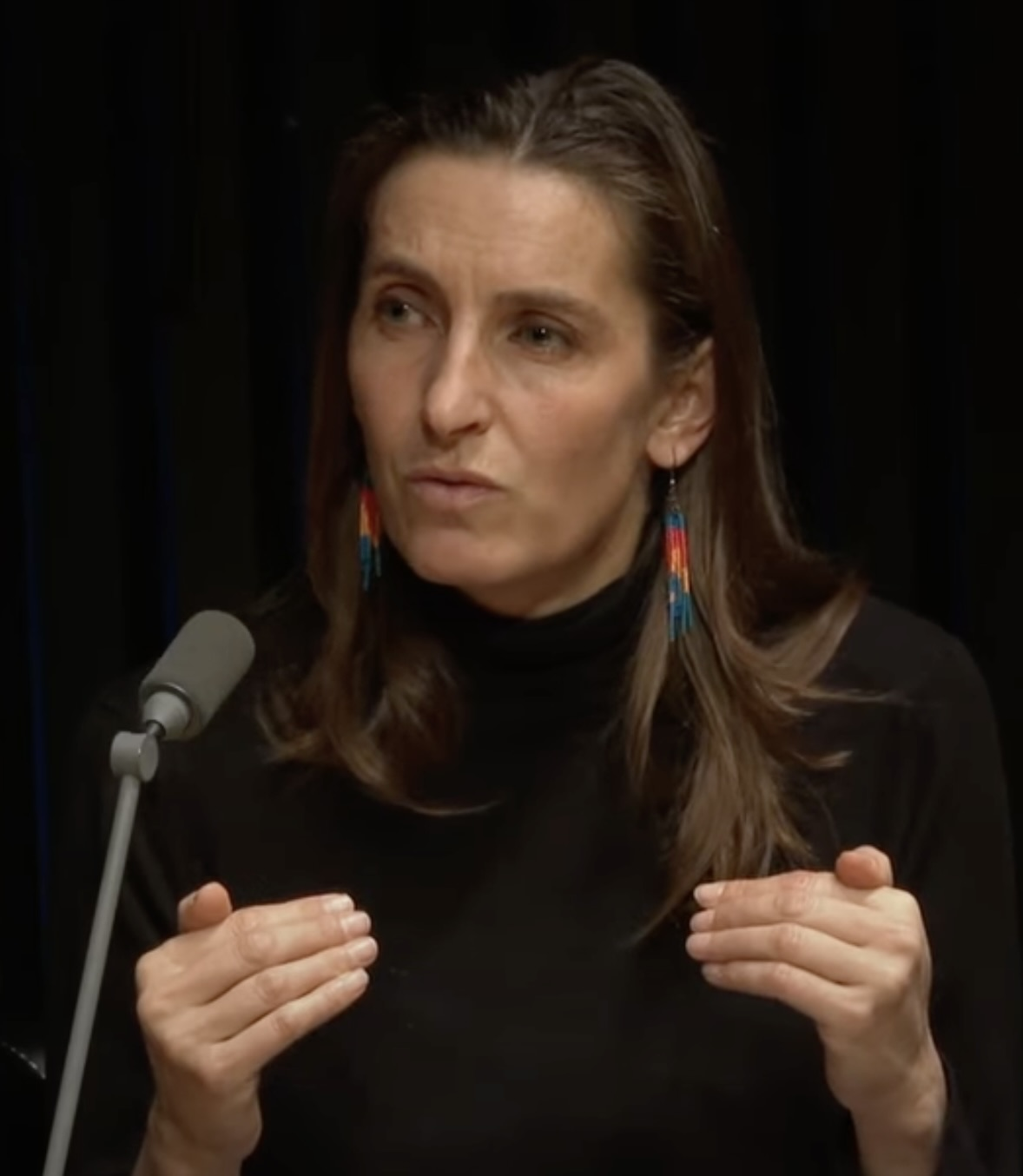
Neige Sinno, 2023 by librairie mollat

Neige Sinno (born 22 May 1977 Vars, Hautes-Alpes) is a French novelist, and memoirist. She has won the Prix Goncourt des Lycéens, Prix Femina, and the Strega European Prize.

== Life ==
Sinno received a doctorate degree in American literature from Université de Provence Aix-Marseille in 2005. She lectured at Yale University. She lives in Michoacan.

== Works ==
- La Vie des Rats. 2007.
- Le Camion, 2018
- Triste Tigre, 2023
  - Sad Tiger, translator Natasha Lehrer, 2025. ISBN 978-1-64421-467-1
