= Dorothy, a publishing project =

Publishing house in Missouri, US

- Founded: 2009
- Founders: Danielle Dutton and Martin Riker
- Country of origin: United States
- Headquarters location: St. Louis, Missouri
- Distribution: Small Press Distribution
- Publication types: Books
- Fiction genres: Literary fiction
- Official website: dorothyproject.com

Dorothy, a publishing project is a St. Louis–based small press publishing house founded by Danielle Dutton and Martin Riker in 2009. Dorothy specializes in publishing short works of literary fiction written by women. The press releases two books each year, with the titles being a mix of new works and reprints. Some are written in English and others are translated from foreign languages. Dorothy has been lauded for its promotion of experimental literature that blends together different forms and styles, often crossing over between prose and poetry, as well as for its design aesthetic and the tactile appeal of its books as physical objects.

Dorothy is largely operated by its founders. The press derives its name from Dutton's great-aunt, Dorothy Traver. Traver worked as a librarian in San Bernardino County in the 1950s and 1960s. She travelled around in her station wagon into delivering books to distant towns that were lacking in libraries and well stocked book shops. Renee Gladman, the first author published by Dorothy, also helped in choosing the press's name.

A writer for The Atlantic said, "Dorothy books emerge each October like ringing endorsements of writers you’ve never heard of by a friend whose taste you can absolutely trust."

== Notable authors ==
- Amina Cain
- Azareen Van Der Vliet Oloomi
- Barbara Comyns
- Cristina Rivera Garza
- Jen George
- Joanna Ruocco
- Joanna Walsh
- Leonora Carrington
- Manuela Draeger
- Marguerite Duras
- Marianne Fritz
- Nathalie Léger
- Nell Zink
- Renee Gladman
- Rosmarie Waldrop
- Sabrina Orah Mark
- Suzanne Scanlon

== Books ==
- Ana Patova Crosses a Bridge by Renee Gladman
- Creature by Amina Cain
- Dan by Joanna Ruocco
- Event Factory by Renee Gladman
- Fra Keeler by Azareen Van der Vliet Oloomi
- Houses of Ravicka by Renee Gladman
- In the Time of the Blue Ball by Manuela Draeger (translated by Brian Evenson & Valerie Evenson)
- Me & Other Writing by Marguerite Duras (translated by Olivia Baes & Emma Ramadan)
- My Lesbian Novel by Renee Gladman
- Overstaying by Ariane Koch
- Promising Young Women by Suzanne Scanlon
- Suite for Barbara Loden by Nathalie Léger (translated by Natasha Lehrer & Cécile Menon)
- The Autobiography of H. Lan Thao Lam by Lana Lin
- The Babysitter at Rest by Jen George
- The Complete Stories by Leonora Carrington
- The Endless Week by Laura Vazquez
- The Hanky of Pippin's Daughter by Rosmarie Waldrop
- The Long Form by Kate Briggs
- The New Animals by Pip Adam
- The Ravickians by Renee Gladman
- The Taiga Syndrome by Cristina Rivera Garza (translated by Suzanne Jill Levine & Aviva Kana)
- The Wallcreeper by Nell Zink
- The Weight of Things by Marianne Fritz (translated by Adrian Nathan West)
- TOAF by Renee Gladman
- Vertigo by Joanna Walsh
- Who Was Changed and Who Was Dead by Barbara Comyns
- Wild Milk by Sabrina Orah Mark
