= Danielle Dutton =

American writer and publisher

- Born: October 18, 1975 (age 50); Visalia, California, U.S.
- Education: University of California, Santa Cruz (B.A.); School of the Art Institute of Chicago (M.F.A.); University of Denver (Ph.D.)
- Occupations: Writer; publisher; professor
- Employers: Dorothy, a publishing project; Washington University in St. Louis
- Notable work: Margaret the First
- Website: danielledutton.net

Danielle Dutton (born October 18, 1975) is an American writer and publisher.

== Early life and education ==
Dutton was born in Visalia, California, on October 18, 1975. She received her B.A. in history from the University of California, Santa Cruz in 1997, an MFA from the School of the Art Institute of Chicago, and a PhD in English and Creative Writing from the University of Denver. During her time at DU, she served as the Associate Editor of the Denver Quarterly, under editor Bin Ramke. For several years she taught courses in the Jack Kerouac School of Disembodied Poetics at Naropa University. In 2011 she joined the MFA program in creative writing in the College of Arts and Sciences at Washington University in St. Louis as an assistant professor.

== Writing ==
Of her first book, Attempts at a Life, a collection of short lyrical narratives published in 2007 by Tarpaulin Sky Press, novelist Daniel Handler wrote in Entertainment Weekly: “Indescribably beautiful, also indescribable. In fact, I’m not quite sure what this book’s about, really. Read it; remind yourself that comprehending things all the time is really boring.” In the Review of Contemporary Fiction, critic Kate Zambreno wrote: "Dutton's glorious version of Jane Eyre reads like one of The Guardian's congested reads as reimagined by Gertrude Stein or Jane Bowles."

Dutton's second book was the experimental novel S P R A W L, published by the LA-based art press Siglio. It was a finalist for the Believer Book Award in 2011. The editors of The Believer wrote: "Dutton’s sentences are as taut and controlled as her narrator’s mind, and a hint at what compels both ('I locate my body by grounding it against the bodies of others') betrays a fierce and feral searching. S P R A W L makes suburban landscapes thrilling again." In Bookforum, Leigh Newman wrote: "Sprawl in fact does not sprawl at all; rather, it radiates with control and fresh, strange reflection."

Dutton's fiction has appeared in magazines including The New Yorker, Harper's, BOMB, Noon, Fence, Places: Design Observer, and in anthologies including A Best of Fence: The First Nine Years and I'll Drown My Book: Conceptual Writing by Women.

Her 2016 book Margaret the First dramatizes the life of Margaret Cavendish, Duchess of Newcastle-upon-Tyne.

== Publishing ==
After finishing her PhD, Dutton joined the staff of Dalkey Archive Press, first as managing editor and then as production manager and book designer. She designed covers for such books as Stories and Essays of Mina Loy, Terra Nostra by Carlos Fuentes, The Log of the SS the Mrs Unguentine by Stanley Crawford, Suicide by Eduoard Leve, The Engineer of Human Souls by Josef Skvoreky, Perfect Lives by Robert Ashley, Ryder by Djuna Barnes, and more than 100 others, and was interviewed for her designs by Elle magazine.

In 2010, Dutton founded the indie press Dorothy, a publishing project. The website states that Dorothy, a publishing project is dedicated "to works of fiction, or near fiction, or about fiction, mostly by women." To date, the press has published books by Renee Gladman, Barbara Comyns, Manuela Draeger (translated from the French by Brian Evenson), Suzanne Scanlon, Azareen Van der Vliet Oloomi, Amina Cain, Joanna Ruocco, Nell Zink, Joanna Walsh, Marianne Fritz (translated from the German by Adrian Nathan West), Jen George, Nathalie Léger (translated from the French by Natasha Leher and Cécil Menon). Though it publishes only two books per year, the press has garnered wide praise and reviews of its books in such publications as the Los Angeles Times, Vice, The New York Times, and Harper's. Dutton has been interviewed about the press in magazines including the Paris Review Daily, Kirkus Reviews, BOMB, and for articles in Poets & Writers and Publishers Weekly. In a 2014 article in the Chicago Tribune, critic Laura Pearson wrote: "Truthfully, we'd check out anything from Dorothy, a publishing project, so keen is editor Danielle Dutton's eye for weird, wonderful manuscripts — most of which happen to be by women. Plus, the St. Louis-based press only puts out two books a year, so it's very doable."
