= Object Lessons (book series) =

Series of books and essays

Object Lessons is "an essay and book series about the hidden lives of ordinary things". Each of the essays (2,000 words) and the books (25,000 words) investigate a single object through a variety of approaches that often reveal something unexpected about that object. As stated in the Object Lessons webpage, "Each Object Lessons project will start from a specific inspiration: an anthropological query, ecological matter, archeological discovery, historical event, literary passage, personal narrative, philosophical speculation, technological innovation—and from there develop original insights and novel lessons about the object in question."

In 2023, it was announced that the series was now based in the Program in Public Scholarship in Arts & Sciences at Washington University in St. Louis and would publish its hundredth book in the series.

== Series publishers ==
- The Atlantic
- Bloomsbury Publishing

== Series editors ==
- Ian Bogost – Washington University in St. Louis, formerly Georgia Institute of Technology
- Christopher Schaberg – Washington University in St. Louis, formerly Loyola University New Orleans
- Haaris Naqvi – Bloomsbury Publishing

== Books ==
- Driver's License – Meredith Castile
- Remote Control – Caetlin Benson-Allott
- Golf Ball – Harry Brown
- Drone – Adam Rothstein
- Glass – John Garrison
- Phone Booth – Ariana Kelly
- Refrigerator – Jonathan Rees
- Silence – John Biguenet
- Hotel – Joanna Walsh
- Dust – Michael Marder
- Shipping Container – Craig Martin
- Hood – Alison Kinney
- Cigarette Lighter – Jack Pendarvis
- Bookshelf – Lydia Pyne
- Bread – Scott Shershow
- Password – Martin Paul Eve
- Hair – Scott Lowe
- Waste – Brian Thill
- Questionnaire – Evan Kindley
- Egg - Nicole Walker
- Tree - Matthew Battles
- Blanket - Kara Thompson
- Shopping Mall - Matthew Newton
- Sock - Kim Adrian
- Eye Chart - William Germano
- Earth - Jeffrey Jerome Cohen and Lindy Elkins-Tanton
- Veil - Rafia Zakaria
- Tumor - Anne Leahy
- Personal Stereo - Rebecca Tuhus-Dubrow
- Jet Lag - Christopher J. Lee
- High Heel - Summer Brennan
- Traffic - Paul Josephson
- Whale Song - Margret Grebowicz
- Burger - Carol J. Adams
- Rust - Jean-Michel Rabaté
- Souvenir - Rolf Potts
- Luggage - Susan Harlan
- Fog - Stephen Sparks
- Doctor - Andrew Bomback
- Fake - Kati Stevens
- Pill - Robert Bennett
- Potato - Rebecca Earle
- Bulletproof Vest - Kenneth R. Rosen
- Environment - Rolf Halden
- Cell Tower - Steven E. Jones
- Ocean - Steve Mentz
- Compact Disc - Robert Barry
- Bird - Erik Anderson
- Magnet - Eva Barbarossa
- Hashtag - Elizabeth Losh
- Email - Randy Malamud
- High Heel - Summer Brennan
- Coffee - Dinah Lenney
- Snake - Erica Wright
- Exit - Laura Waddell
- Political Sign - Tobias Carroll
- Office - Sheila Liming
- Signature - Hunter Dukes
- Fat - Hanne Blank
- Gin - Shonna Milliken Humphrey
- TV - Susan Bordo
- Blackface - Ayanna Thompson
- Hyphen - Pardis Mahdavi
- Spacecraft - Timothy Morton
- Football - Mark Yakich
- Perfume - Megan Volpert
- Glitter - Nicole Seymour
- Recipe - Lynn Z. Bloom
- Trench Coat- Jane Tynan
- Stroller - Amanda Parrish Morgan
- Sewer - Jessica Leigh Hester
- Doll - Maria Teresa Hart
- Scream - Michael J. Seidlinger
- Alarm - Alice Bennett
- OK - Michelle McSweeney
- Mushroom - Sara Rich
- Skateboard - Jonathan Russell Clark
- Sticker - Henry Hoke
- Blue Jeans - Carolyn Purnell
- Grave - Allison C. Meier
- Pregnancy Test - Karen Weingarten
- Wine - Meg Bernherd
- Barcode - Jordan Firth
- Magazine - Jeff Jarvis
- Relic - Ed Simon
- Bicycle - Jonathan Maskit
- Air Conditioning - Hsuan L. Hsu
- Swimming Pool - Piotr Florczyk
- Pencil - Carol Beggy
- Space Rover - Stewart Lawrence Sinclair
- Newspaper - Maggie Messitt
- Mask - Sharrona Pearl
- X-Ray - Nicole Lobdell
- Island - Julian Hanna
- Oil - Michael Tondre
- Pub - Philip Howell
- Microphone - Ralph Jones

== Reception ==
"They are beautiful: elegant paperbacks, the quality kind, with front and back flaps, not quite pocket-sized but easily transportable, each coming in at under 200 pages, each inspired by an object. ... Billed as books about 'the hidden lives of ordinary things,' there are 10 so far, and every one a curiosity; not just an object, but a world in and of itself."—Los Angeles Review of Books

"In 1957 the French critic and semiotician Roland Barthes published Mythologies, a groundbreaking series of essays in which he analysed the popular culture of his day, from laundry detergent to the face of Greta Garbo, professional wrestling to the Citroën DS. This series of short books, 'Object Lessons', continues the tradition; subjects already covered include the remote control, driver's licence, shipping container and drone, with more to come."—Financial Times
