= Hotel (Walsh book) =

2015 book by Joanna Walsh

- Author: Joanna Walsh
- Language: English
- Published: London
- Publisher: Bloomsbury Publishing
- Publication date: 2015
- Publication place: United Kingdom
- Pages: 170
- ISBN: 9781628924732
- Dewey Decimal: 647.94

Hotel is a 2015 book by Irish-English writer, illustrator and critic Joanna Walsh. The book is in the Bloomsbury series Object Lessons

== Synopsis ==
The book is an instalment in the Bloomsbury Academic series Object Lessons. The series is intended to discuss the hidden lives ordinary things. Hotel examines the luxury, sex, power, anonymity, privacy of hotels; places where "desires go on holiday, but also places where our desires are shaped by the hard realities of the marketplace"

== Reception ==
In the Financial Times Melissa Harrison praised Hotel as being "densely patterned, deeply personal" and wrote that "Walsh's writing has intellectual rigour and bags of formal bravery" and also stated that the book "is a boldly intellectual work that repays careful reading" In the New Statesman Marina Benjamin wrote that "I loved Hotel and would read it again for the pleasure of its playful linguistic slips (not all of them Freudian) and jokes." and praised the Hotel as "slyly humorous and clever"
