= Margaret the First =

2016 fictional biography by Danielle Dutton

- First edition
- Author: Danielle Dutton
- Language: English
- Publication date: 2016

Margaret the First is a fictional, historical biography written by Danielle Dutton, first published in 2016 by Catapult then by Scribe Publications later that year. Based on the historical figure of Margaret Cavendish, Duchess of Newcastle-upon-Tyne, Dutton weaves an imaginative story about the duchess's extraordinary life.

== Synopsis ==
The book begins with a third person narration of Margaret Lucas's life. It later switches to Margaret's point-of-view. She describes her childhood and how she was very different from her siblings growing up. Margaret later becomes a lady to Queen Henrietta Maria. During her time as a lady, she meets marquess William Cavendish. He begins to court her and they eventually marry; she becomes his second wife.

Margaret describes life in exile with her new husband and the numerous doctor visits she endured in their attempt to conceive. She begins to write, publishing her work in secret. Margaret gains fame for her work, drawing the attention of everyone in society. Eventually, she becomes the first woman to be invited into the Royal Society. The book ends with her revising her book, The Blazing World.

== Main characters ==
- Margaret Cavendish – The youngest of eight children. She was Lady-in-Waiting to Queen Henrietta Maria. Later, she becomes the second wife of William Cavendish. Margaret never has children, but her published works become her legacy. Before marrying, she was called Mistress Margaret Lucas. After her marriage, she was titled the Marchioness of Newcastle. Later, she is titled the Duchess of Newcastle.
- William Cavendish – Husband to Margaret. He was exiled, but eventually is welcomed back to court. Before becoming the Duke of Newcastle, he was titled Marquess of Newcastle.

== Reception ==
Margaret the First was first published in 2016 and has received positive reviews. The New York Times said that "the duchess herself would be delighted at her resurrection in Margaret the First . . . Dutton expertly captures the pathos of a woman whose happiness is furrowed with the anxiety of underacknowledgment." A review from The Guardian praises Dutton for "us[ing] her staccato structure to illuminate from within individual moments of frustration and inspiration" with Margaret's character. Dutton is again praised in another review from BBC.com for her "refreshing and idiosyncratic style . . . [she] portrays the inner turmoil and eccentric genius of an intellectual far ahead of her time."
