= Odyssey: Driving Around the World =

- Genre: Documentary
- Created by: Adam Burgess
- Starring: Rolf Potts, Nick, Todd, Nancy, Justin Mounts, Chanda, Neil special guests:The Dalai Lama, Michael J. Fox, James Cameron
- Narrated by: Gareth Wesley
- Country of origin: United States
- No. of episodes: 13

Production
- Executive producer: Adam Burgess
- Running time: 23 minutes

Original release
- Network: Nat Geo Adventure, OLN, The 101 Network, Life TV, Extreme Sports Channel, Drive TV, The Israeli Travel Channel

Odyssey: Driving Around the World is a documentary television series. It follows the 66,000-kilometre (41,000 mi) driving expedition of seven Americans, including travel writer Rolf Potts. They depart from San Francisco and head south through 26 countries of North America, South America, Australia, and Asia, and back home 15 months later. The team's experience include encounters with a Pol Pot survivor in Cambodia, a Buddhist orphanage in Myanmar, and the Dalai Lama in India. Guest appearances include actor Michael J. Fox and director James Cameron.

Burgess Productions produced the series. ODYSSEY is the title of the documentary travel adventure series itself, with Driving Around the World as the subtitle for the first season.

== Overview ==
A team of seven adventurers departs from San Francisco, California, to begin a 66,000-kilometre (41,000 mi) expedition around the world that follows following the lines of longitude through 26 countries. They drive four Land Rovers across four continents, exploring and interacting with the peoples, cultures and landscapes encountered during the expedition.

The series focuses on their journey, which combines elements of drama and adventure. Scenes from various episodes include high tensions in Panama when the team is stuck on the side of the road with two flat tires, spending New Year's Eve in Guayaquil, Ecuador, where they explode effigies with the locals, and running out of gas in the Atacama Desert in Chile. The team takes their first dive on the Great Barrier Reef in Cairns, Australia, and are the first westerners to cross Myanmar east to west in over 50 years. After meeting the Dalai Lama at his Indian home in exile, they are detained in India, deported from China, and sent back into Pakistan. They slip months behind schedule, and are forced to cross Siberia during mid-winter in frigid temperatures of −59 °C (−74 °F) to compete their final leg of the journey through Russia, Alaska, Canada, and back home 15 months after their journey began.

== Route ==
Starting from the San Francisco Bay Area, the team heads down through Mexico and Central America. They catch a ship from Panama to Ecuador to circumvent the Darién Gap and continue south to the tip of Argentina to the southernmost city in the world, Ushuaia. Then they swing north to Zarate where the cars catch a ship to Australia. From Brisbane, Australia, they drive north to Cairns and begin their westbound stretch across 900 miles (1,400 km) of the Outback on the Gunbarrel Highway. From Perth the vehicles and team catch a ship to Singapore, where they head north through South East Asia. After crossing Myanmar from east to west along the Stilwell Road, the route continues west into India. They dodge sacred cows and stomach illnesses and meet with the Dalai Lama in Dharamsala. He blesses their journey and signs the hood of their car. Continuing up the Himalayas in Kashmir the team travels over the highest motorable road in the world, the Khardung La Pass and up the Karakoram Highway through Pakistan before descending into China. Their route continues north through Kazakhstan and into Siberia where they head for the city Yakutsk. With the Siberian winter in full gear they drive over the Lena River and the Aldan River before heading west along the Road of Bones to catch their last ship from Magadan to Alaska. Their home stretch first takes them up to Prudhoe Bay, Alaska, where they walk on the Arctic Ocean. They travel down the Dalton Highway and the Alcan Highway, through the towering forests and craggy coasts of Canada back to San Francisco a year after their voyage began.

ODYSSEY travels through the 26 countries of Mexico, Guatemala, El Salvador, Honduras, Nicaragua, Costa Rica, Panama, Ecuador, Peru, Bolivia, Chile, Argentina, Australia, Singapore, Malaysia, Thailand, Cambodia, Laos, Myanmar, India, Pakistan, China, Kazakhstan, Russian Federation, Canada, and the United States.

== Vehicles ==
Three Land Rovers are seen during the series, but the expedition actually included a fourth, the film crew vehicle. They were equipped with a V8 petrol engine and slight suspension modifications to accommodate for slightly larger tires. The roof racks carried necessary supplies and equipment including rooftop tents where the team spent many nights out of the cold. The bumpers carried winches and lighting for rescue and low visibility driving. There were few troubles with the vehicles as a whole, but the punishing roads took its toll over time. Strut and exhaust bolts loosened up in South America, windows dropped into doors in the Outback, and a U-joint broke in Siberia. The biggest obstacle was fuel economy, which averaged around 12 mpg.

== Charitable efforts ==
=== Parkinson's disease ===
The expedition was also a fundraiser for Parkinson's disease, with every kilometer driven raising direct donations to the Parkinson's Institute in Sunnyvale, California. Three of the team members had relatives suffering from the disease, and during the journey the team took time out to meet with doctors and patients in clinics around the world, visiting and sharing their knowledge of new treatments.

=== Other charities ===
ODYSSEY also took the opportunity to help bring social consciousness to three other philanthropic organizations they encountered during the expedition.

1. Kids Saving the Rainforest (Episode 2), a young girls group aiming to preserve Costa Rica's rainforests and animals against rapid development.
2. Landmine Survivors Network (Episode 8), an organization for helping survivors of land mine accidents cope with their debilitating injuries, chosen by the team after they come across a musical band of mine victims in Cambodia.
3. Myanmar Buddhist Orphanage Association (MBOA) (Episode 9), an orphanage in Mandalay, Myanmar funded entirely by external donations.
