= Audience (TV network) =

American pay television channel (1999–2020)

Audience Network
- Country: United States
- Broadcast area: Nationwide
- Headquarters: El Segundo, California

Programming
- Language: English
- Picture format: 720p HDTV (downscaled to letterboxed 480i for the SDTV feed)

Ownership
- Owner: DirecTV

History
- Launched: November 25, 1999; 26 years ago
- Closed: May 22, 2020; 6 years ago
- Former names: Freeview (1999–2005); The 101 Network (2005–11)

Audience Network (formerly known as Freeview from 1999 until 2005, and as The 101 Network from 2005 until 2011) was an American pay television channel owned by AT&T. It featured a mix of original and acquired series, specials, and feature films. The network operated as a commercial-free service and broadcast its programming without editing for content. It was originally exclusive to DirecTV, though it was also added to AT&T U-verse after AT&T's 2015 acquisition of DirecTV. It was also made available on later AT&T streaming efforts, including AT&T TV and AT&T Watch TV, a lower-cost option available to AT&T Mobility customers. As of 2019, the channel had a subscription base of 26 million. The channel closed on May 22, 2020.

== History ==
The channel launched on November 25, 1999, as Freeview, a service on DirecTV channel 103 carrying a continuous loop of concerts and other events. Freeview was part of all of the satellite provider's subscription packages, starting with the Total Choice tier. In 2005, it was moved to channel 101 and was rebranded as The 101 Network. Following the rebrand, the channel's schedule began to expand to include original programs, with its first original program CD USA being announced on November 1, 2005.

The channel was rebranded as Audience Network on June 1, 2011. In 2015, the channel was added to AT&T U-verse after DirecTV was acquired by AT&T. In June 2018, AT&T announced its discount streaming service, WatchTV, which would carry Audience.

=== Closure ===
On January 8, 2020, it was announced by parent company AT&T that Audience would end operations in its current format and transition to a barker channel for HBO Max, a service which launched on May 27. Rich Eisen later confirmed in a statement regarding the future of his daily radio show (which had maintained a longtime video simulcast on Audience) that the network would close on February 29 (his show ended the day before on Audience, and ended on radio on April 7). AT&T itself would not confirm the actual end date for the network at the time and continued for two months after with previous programming, though simulcasts of Eisen's show and The Dan Patrick Show both ended on February 28, and the network's website became merely a redirect to the generic DirecTV network listing. Eisen later found a new television homes on NBCSN, YouTube, and later on The Roku Channel, with Patrick also utilizing a YouTube live stream during the COVID-19 pandemic, before both ultimately moved to the Comcast-owned streaming service Peacock. In mid-April 2020, AT&T notified customers the network would officially shut down at 12:00 am Pacific on May 22, 2020. The network closed as scheduled after an airing of the documentary Black Sabbath: The End of The End, after which the channel space created by Freeview in 1999 folded.

== Programming ==
=== Acquisition of Wonderland ===
Starting in January 2009, the channel aired Wonderland, a drama series that had briefly aired on ABC in the spring of 2000. The run included all eight episodes of the series, six of which were not originally aired during the program's ABC run.

=== Partnerships with NBC ===
==== Acquisition of Passions ====
DirecTV and NBC Universal Television Studio announced on April 25, 2007, that new episodes of the soap opera Passions would begin airing exclusively on the channel on September 17, 2007, retaining its 2:00 p.m. Eastern Time timeslot that it held during its NBC run, with reruns airing on weekends. The series had aired on NBC since July 1999, however in early 2007, the network announced they were canceling the series as a result of replacing it by a fourth hour of Today and shortly afterwards DirecTV acquired exclusive broadcasting rights from NBC to renew the series and move it to 101 Network. The final NBC episode was aired on September 7, 2007, ending its eight-year broadcast on NBC before the new episodes began airing exclusively on DirecTV starting September 17, 2007. Although Passions moved to DirecTV's 101 Network, NBC continued to maintain the series official website on NBC.com due to the fact that their parent company NBCUniversal maintained ownership and production rights to the series, however the free streaming service of the new episodes of Passions on NBC.com and the option to purchase the episodes for download on iTunes, which had started in the final NBC 2006-07 season were completely discontinued once DirecTV began exclusively airing the new episodes. Initially the DirecTV episodes were only supposed to be available on their own network, but DirecTV later announced an agreement to allow NBC to rebroadcast the DirecTV episodes of Passions only as a paid subscription internet streaming content on NBC.com with a monthly subscription fee as an alternative for viewers who were unable to subscribe to DirecTV after the series moved to 101 Network; this began in October 2007. In December 2007, DirecTV announced that it would not renew Passions for a tenth season and that the series was officially canceled, the series finale aired on August 7, 2008.

==== Shared broadcast rights of Friday Night Lights ====
DirecTV, NBC, and Universal Media Studios announced a deal on April 2, 2008, in which The 101 would carry the 13-episode third season of Friday Night Lights beginning on October 1. Through the deal, after the season ended on The 101, the drama series' third season aired in second-run form on NBC (with some scenes edited) starting on January 16, 2009. On March 31, 2009, NBC and DirecTV announced that they had renewed Friday Night Lights for two additional seasons, again to be broadcast first on DirecTV and then on NBC.

=== Acquisition of Damages ===
On July 19, 2010, DirecTV announced it had acquired the rights to the FX drama Damages, and renewed the series for two additional seasons following FX's cancellation of the series. The 101 Network began airing reruns of its first three seasons on January 5, 2011. Season 4 premiered on the rebranded Audience Network on July 13, 2011, and the fifth and final season premiered on July 11, 2012.

=== Off-network reruns ===
The channel aired repeat episodes of SoapNet's original soap opera limited series, General Hospital: Night Shift throughout the series' run from July to October 2008.

The channel broadcast the Nat Geo Adventure's documentary travel/adventure series Odyssey: Driving Around the World starting in June 2008.

The short-lived ABC drama The Nine began airing on the channel on May 27, 2009.

The channel also aired reruns of the 2005–06 Showtime drama series Sleeper Cell. On April 21, 2009, it was announced that DirecTV acquired the syndication rights to HBO's Oz and Deadwood.

The channel began airing the CBS drama Smith on April 8, 2009. It also began a general agreement with Warner Bros. Domestic Television Distribution to air Eyes onto the channel also in 2009.

DirecTV aired repeats of the HBO drama series The Wire starting on July 18, 2010.

=== International programming ===
In its later years, DirecTV began acquiring exclusive US broadcast rights to series from fellow English-speaking countries UK, Canada and Australia.

The 101 began airing the Canadian comedy series Trailer Park Boys on February 5, 2009.

On September 17, 2009, DirecTV announced that The 101 had acquired the rights to the Australian miniseries Underbelly, which began airing on February 3, 2010.

On September 28, 2010, DirecTV acquired rights to the British shows No Heroics, How Not to Live Your Life and Mutual Friends, which premiered on The 101 in November 2010.

On February 10, 2011, DirecTV acquired rights to the Canadian series Call Me Fitz, which premiered on the network on April 21, 2011.

In the spring of 2011, DirecTV acquired the rights to the Australian series Rake.

In the fall of 2011, DirecTV acquired rights to the Canadian sitcom Less Than Kind and the British drama Hit & Miss, the latter of which premiered on June 27, 2012, with a sneak preview, with the first full episode airing on July 11, 2012.

DirecTV also acquired the rights to the Australian series The Slap and the British series The Shadow Line, which started airing on Audience Network in February 2012.

=== Specials ===
Celebrity Beach Bowl – Starting in 2007, during Super Bowl week, DirecTV held an annual celebrity flag football game, which promoted DirecTV's exclusive sports package NFL Sunday Ticket. A concert followed the game, which was simulcast on Chicago television station WGN-TV, its sister network WGN America, now known as NewsNation, and in 2013, NBC Sports Network.

Bracket Breakdown was an exclusive NCAA Men's Division I Basketball Championship pre-game show with several college basketball analysts and insiders, including the University of Louisville's Rick Pitino, the University of Kentucky's John Calipari, the University of Oklahoma's Jeff Capel, the University of Tennessee's Bruce Pearl and the University of Washington's Lorenzo Romar and former UCLA player and current sports talk radio show host Sean Farnham. It served as supplemental coverage to DirecTV's exclusive (now defunct) Mega March Madness package.

SXSW – the channel exclusively carried the 2009 South by Southwest Festival concert live.

Farm Aid 25: Growing Hope for America aired exclusively on DirecTV.

On February 13, 2012, Audience Network premiered the original documentary More Than a Dream, about the Civil Rights Movement, narrated by Martin Sheen.

=== Films and previews ===
In October 2006, to mark Halloween, Audience Network aired several horror-themed movies, including The Toxic Avenger.

On February 23 and 24, 2007, Audience Network aired a preview of Chiller, a then-recently launched cable channel owned by NBC Universal dedicated to horror programming that launched on DirecTV channel 257 on March 1, 2007. Programming featured during this preview included the two-hour pilot episode of Twin Peaks, the pilot episode of American Gothic, episodes of Monsters, Tales from the Crypt, Night Gallery, Alfred Hitchcock Presents, Friday the 13th: The Series, and various horror movies.

Audience Network aired a number of dramatic series a few days before their scheduled premieres on Showtime including The Tudors in March 2007 and Nurse Jackie in June 2009, as well as the Starz series Party Down on April 22, 2010.

On August 24, 2007, Audience Network aired an exclusive high-definition broadcast of High School Musical 2, one week after its premiere on the Disney Channel (Disney Channel did not launch a high definition simulcast feed until April 2, 2008).

On November 11, 2017, Audience Network premiered the first part of the two-part documentary The Volunteers. The documentary is about volunteers taking up arms against ISIS in Syria. Ricky Schroder is the executive producer.
