= The Babysitter at Rest =

2016 short story collection by Jen George

- First edition
- Author: Jen George
- Language: English
- Publisher: the Dorothy Project
- Publication date: 2016

The Babysitter at Rest is a collection of short stories by American writer Jen George published in 2016 by the Dorothy Project. The titular story in the collection won BOMB Magazine's 2015 Fiction Contest. The book consists of five stories centered on female identity, youth, the performance of identity, and fear of domesticity and intimacy. The book's style has been described as surreal, nightmarish, and characterized by distorted images and elaborate exaggeration. George has acknowledged the influence of surrealist painter and writer Leonora Carrington on the stories in the book. The stories have also been compared to the work of Camilla Grudova.
