= Rolf Potts =

American writer

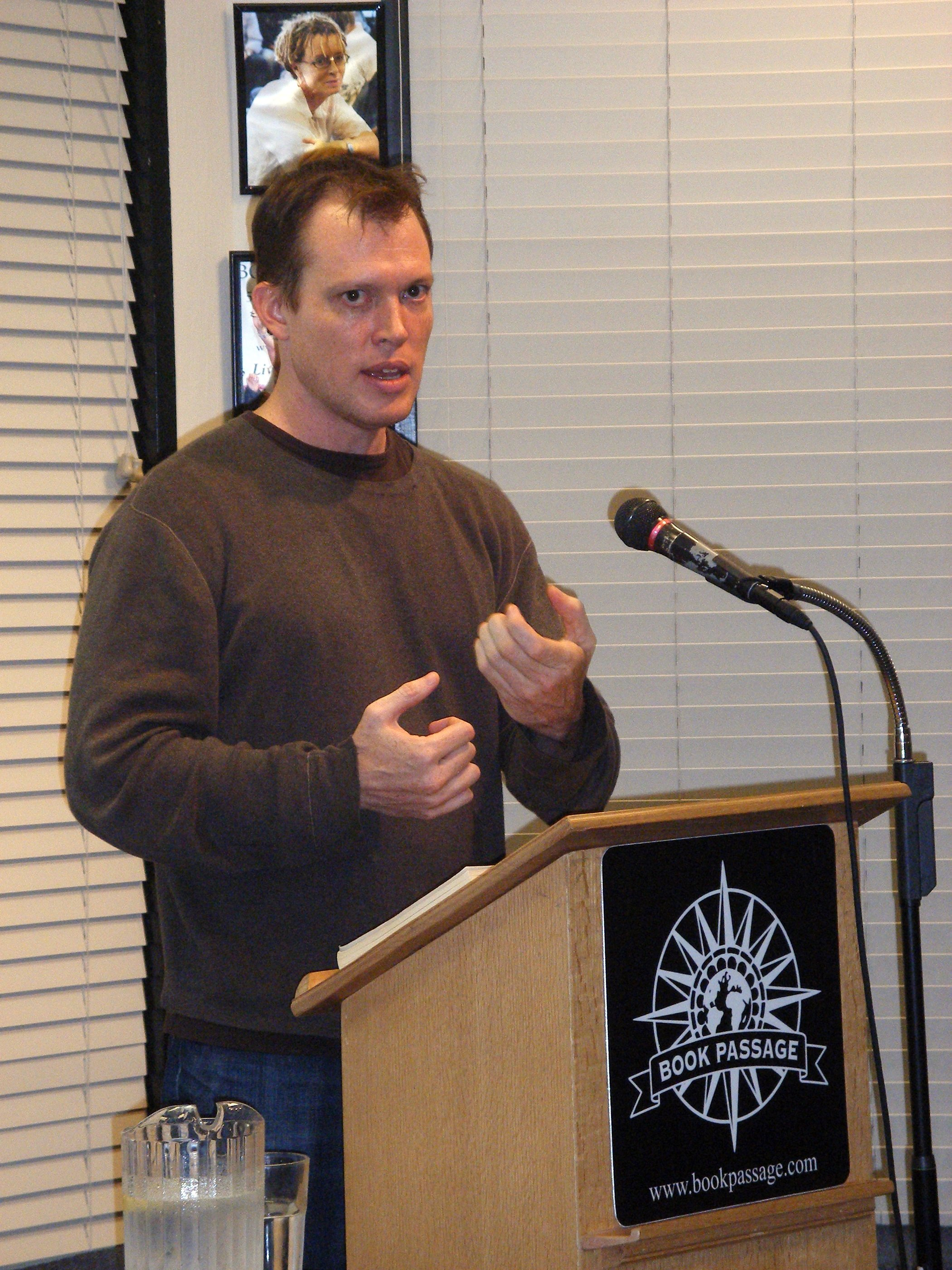
- Rolf Potts talks about his book Marco Polo Didn't Go There
- Born: October 13, 1970 (age 56); Wichita, Kansas, U.S.
- Education: Wichita North High School; George Fox University; Bennington College (MFA)
- Occupations: Writer, journalist
- Spouse: Kristen Bush
- Writing career
- Genre: Travel writing

Rolf Potts (born October 13, 1970) is an American travel writer, essayist, podcaster, and author. He has written five books, including Vagabonding (Random House, 2003), Marco Polo Didn't Go There (Travelers Tales, 2008), Souvenir (Bloomsbury, 2018), and The Vagabond's Way (Ballantine, 2022). The lifestyle philosophies he outlined in Vagabonding are considered to have been a key influence on the digital nomad movement.

== Career ==
=== Online journalism ===
The son of schoolteachers from Wichita, Kansas, Potts' earliest vagabonding journeys included hopping freight trains across the Pacific Northwest, and taking an eight-month "van life before #VanLife" Volkswagen Vanagon journey around North America in the early 1990s. He later taught English in Busan, South Korea before embarking on a pioneering multi-year digital nomad journey, writing from-the-road travel dispatches for such dialup-era online outlets as salonmagazine.com (which later became Salon.com).

In 1999, while traveling in Thailand, Potts attempted to infiltrate the film-set of a Leonardo DiCaprio movie called The Beach. His essay about the experience, "Storming 'The Beach'," was chosen by Bill Bryson for inclusion in The American Travel Writing 2000. Poets & Writers later noted that, "the story, far from being an account of a simple-minded stunt, was actually a fantastic narrative mixed with meditations on the 'shadowlike ironies of travel culture,' Walker Percy's 'traveler's angst,' and 'the greater struggle for individuality in the information age.'" In 2022, more than two decades after "Storming 'The Beach'" went viral, Uproxx noted that it "ushered in a new era of young, web-first...travel writing that influenced a generation."

Potts' travel writing has appeared in venues such as Outside, National Geographic Traveler, Slate, and The Atlantic. In 2010, he wrote and field-produced an online video series about a six-week journey that took him around the world with no luggage or bags of any kind. In addition to writing about travel, Potts has also written about U.S. military reading lists for The New Yorker, Islamist Sayyid Qutb's travel memoirs for The Believer, mockbuster B-movies for the New York Times Magazine, Allen Ginsberg's poem "Wichita Vortex Sutra" for The Nation, and the murder of small-college football player Brandon Brown for Sports Illustrated.

=== Books ===
Vagabonding: An Uncommon Guide to the Art of Long-Term World Travel, Potts' first book, mixes practical advice with philosophical insights about the value of travel. Upon its release in 2003, the Boston Globe called it "a valuable contribution to our thinking, not only about travel, but about life and work." USA Today dubbed the author "Jack Kerouac for the Internet Age" (Potts has downplayed the comparison). The book has been through more than 30 printings, and has been widely translated worldwide.

Potts' second travel book, Marco Polo Didn't Go There: Stories and Revelations From One Decade as a Postmodern Travel Writer, debuted in 2008. The book won a Lowell Thomas Award in the United States, and in 2009 became the first American-authored book to win Italy's Bruce Chatwin Prize for international travel writing. In 2016 Potts released a short book about the psychogeography of the Geto Boys' eponymous, Rick Rubin-produced third album for the 33⅓ series of music criticism, and in 2018 he wrote Souvenir for Bloomsbury's Object Lessons series of books about "the hidden lives of ordinary things." The Boston Globe called Souvenir "a treasure trove of … fascinating deep dives into the history of travel keepsakes."

=== TV, film, and popular culture ===
Potts was featured in several episodes of the 2007 National Geographic Adventure documentary Odyssey: Driving Around the World, and appeared as a commentator in the 2013 documentary film Gringo Trails, which explored the impact of tourism on travel destinations and host communities worldwide.

In "Burn Rate," a 2022 episode in the sixth season of Showtime's Billions, Rian (Eva Victor) brandishes a copy of Vagabonding while "visualizing" a long-term journey in her office ("Rolf shows us how," she tells a coworker). In "Axe Global," the penultimate season 7 episode of Billions, Rian leaves a copy of Vagabonding in the office of her boss Taylor (Asia Kate Dillon) before leaving on an open-ended journey to Morocco and North Africa.

=== Guest lecturing ===
Potts was the 2011-2012 ArtsEdge Writer-in-Residence at the University of Pennsylvania's Kelly Writers House. He more recently taught nonfiction writing at Yale University, and he directs annual summer writing workshops in Paris.

== Personal life ==
When not traveling, Potts lives in a small farmhouse on 30 acres of land in rural north-central Kansas. He is married to actress Kristen Bush.
