= Henry Hoke (author) =

American author

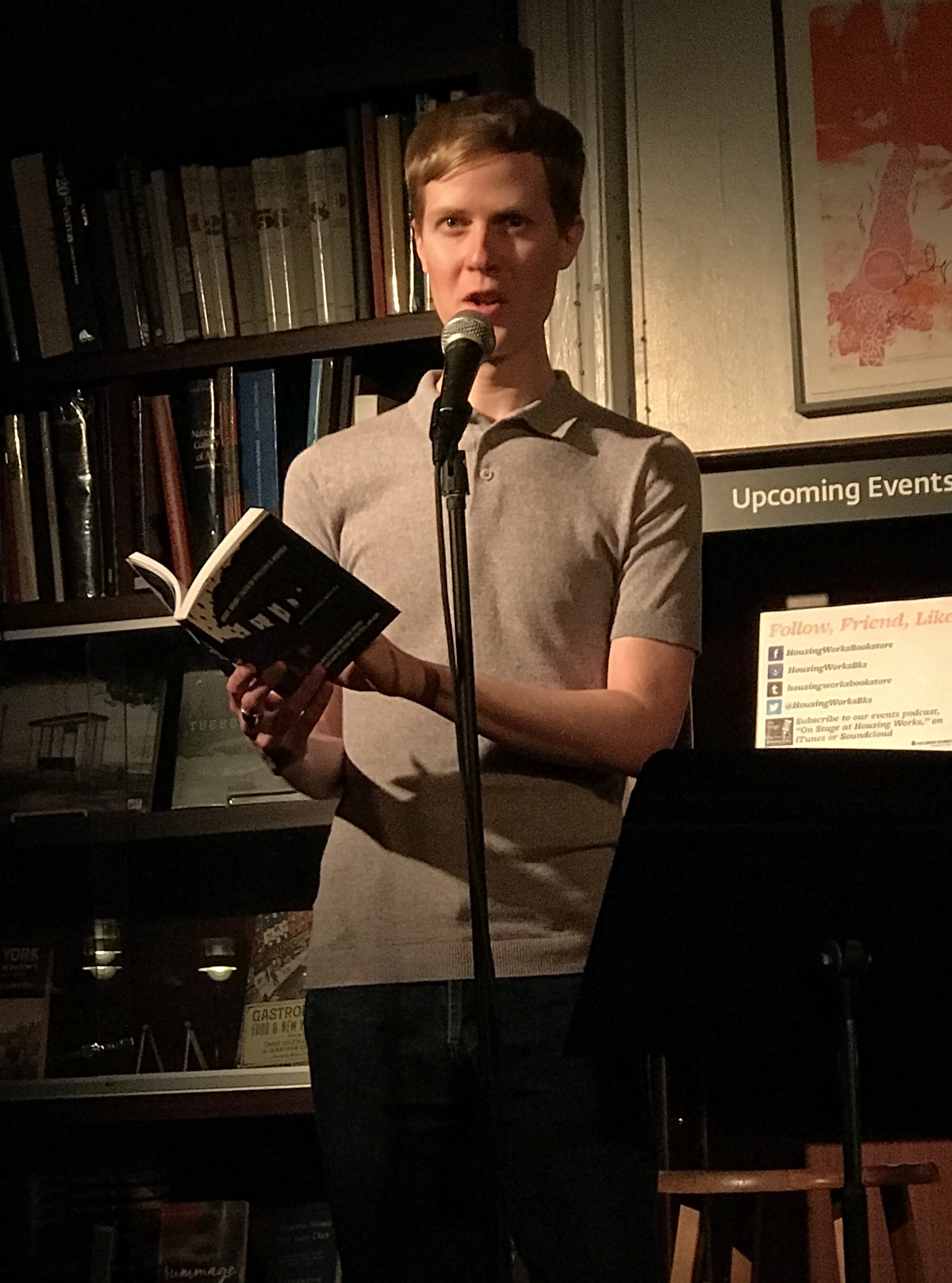
- Henry Hoke reads at Housing Works bookstore, New York City, June 2018
- Born: Henry Hoke Perkins; 1983 (age 42–43); Charlottesville, Virginia
- Education: California Institute of the Arts (MFA)
- Occupation: Writer
- Writing career
- Notable work: Open Throat (2023)
- Website: www.henryhoke.com

Henry Hoke (born 1983 as Henry Hoke Perkins) is an American author known for hybrid books. He directs Enter>text, a business organising annual events, described as a 'living literary journal', and his short fiction and non-fiction have been published in Electric Literature, Hobart, The Collagist, Birkensnake, and Joyland.

== Early life and education ==
Hoke was born in Charlottesville, Virginia. He is a great-grandson of Walter W. Bankhead and a cousin of Tallulah Bankhead. He earned his MFA in creative writing from California Institute of the Arts.

== Enter>text ==
Hoke co-created Enter>text, a series of large-scale immersive literary events, in Los Angeles in 2011. Enter>text has been performed at the &NOW Festival, Machine Project, Human Resources, the Pasadena Museum of California Art, and the Neutra VDL House. Over 150 performers have appeared in Enter>text, including Kate Durbin, Kenyatta A.C. Hinkle, Douglas Kearney, Stephen van Dyck, and Ryka Aoki.

== Awards ==
Hoke's story collection Genevieves won the 2015 book prize for prose from Subito Press at the University of Colorado, Boulder. Open Throat was shortlisted for the PEN/Falkner Award for Fiction of 2024.

Year	Title	Award	Category	Result	Ref.
2023	Open Throat: A Novel	Barnes & Noble Discover Great New Writers Award	—	Finalist	
2024	Open Throat: A Novel	James Tait Black Memorial Prize	Fiction	Shortlisted	
2024	Open Throat: A Novel	Mark Twain American Voice in Literature Award	—	Longlisted	
2024	Open Throat: A Novel	PEN/Faulkner Award for Fiction	—	Finalist	

== Bibliography ==
- —— (2016). The Book of Endless Sleepovers. Civil Coping Mechanisms. ISBN 9781937865771.
- —— (2017). Genevieves. Subito. ISBN 9780990661283.
- —— (2021). The Groundhog Forever. WTAW. ISBN 9781732982055.
- —— (2022). Sticker. Bloomsbury. ISBN 9781501367229.
- —— (2023). Open Throat. Macmillan. ISBN 9780374609870.
- —— (2027). The First Girl in Hell. Farrar, Straus and Giroux. ISBN 9780374621230.
