= Sharrona Pearl =

Canadian-American scholar and writer

Sharrona Pearl (born May 3, 1977) is a Canadian-American historian, theorist of the face and writer who serves as the Andrews Endowed Chair of Interdisciplinary Studies at the John V. Roach Honors College at TCU.

== Background and education ==
She was raised in Toronto, Canada, and graduated from the Community Hebrew Academy of Toronto in 1995. She earned her bachelor’s of arts degree summa cum laude from York University in 1999, and was awarded her doctorate in the History of Science from Harvard University in 2006. She has studied abroad at both the Hebrew University of Jerusalem and the University of Cambridge. Pearl has taught at Harvard University, MIT, The University of Pennsylvania, and Drexel University.

== Scholarship and academic career ==
Pearl has written several articles (both scholarly and popular) exploring the role of the face as a cultural object and the framework for human relationships and communication. She focuses on critical race, gender, sexuality, and disability studies to understand how we make sense of the faces of others and what that says about ourselves. Pearl’s research has been widely cited in the emerging field of face studies and in debates around the ethics of face transplant surgery, and she is regularly interviewed on the subject.

Pearl’s first book, About Faces: Physiognomy in Nineteenth-Century Britain, explored the history of physiognomy, the study of facial features and their relationship to character; when an interviewer asked her to read his face, Pearl quipped that if she studied the history of obstetrics, she would not be asked to deliver his baby. Her second book, Face/On: Face Transplants and the Ethics of the Other chronicled the history, ethics, and medical, bioethical, and journalistic debates around face transplant surgery. Pearl pointed out the role of the military in funding research on face transplants, and explored how television coverage of face transplant recipients followed the logic of makeover television. A review in Social History of Medicine called Face/On “a significant and timely book,” noting that “Pearl writes beautifully and polemically, with a genuine passion for her subject.”

Pearl's third book, Do I Know You? From Face Blindness to Super Recognition explores the spectrum of human face recognition, from the inability to recognize faces (prosopagnosia or face blindness) to the extraordinary ability to remember faces perfectly (super recognition), examining how these extremes developed as scientific concepts and their impact on identity, disability, and surveillance. It's a history of how people came to understand facial recognition as a spectrum, blending neuroscience, personal narratives, and cultural commentary on what faces mean to society. In a rave review, The Washington Post noted that "The book serves as a clinical yet compelling breakdown...Do I Know You? may be most compelling to the face blind and super recognizers (or their loved ones), Pearl adeptly broadens the lens with interesting tidbits, demonstrating what our collective obsession with knowing faces means for us as a society, for good and for ill, especially in our digital era." Her fourth book, Mask, was published in the Objects Lesson series with Bloomsbury Academic, and explores the complex and paradoxical nature of masks, examining how they both conceal and reveal identity through history, culture, and public health, from theater to modern facial recognition.

Pearl has served as the Geddes W. Simpson Distinguished Lecturer at the University of Maine, and as the keynote speaker for the William A. Kern Conference in Visual Communication at Caltech, and as a visiting scholar at Johns Hopkins University. Pearl has received numerous grants and awards, including the Louis and Bessie Stein Family Fellowship in 2020 and a Rapid Response Grant to explore the racial resonances of masking during the pandemic. In 2025, Pearl was part of a team that was awarded a major grant from Interfaith America on Faith and Health.

Pearl is co-editor with Colleen Derkatch of the Health Humanities series at Johns Hopkins University Press.

== Freelance writing ==
Pearl has written op-eds, essays, and commentary for the Washington Post, Tablet Magazine, Real Life Magazine, Aeon Magazine, Lilith Magazine, and numerous other publications.

== Religious life ==
In addition to her research and writing on faces, Pearl writes regularly on Judaism, social justice, community life, and religious observance, including essays in Kveller, Lilith Magazine, Tablet Magazine, The Revealer, and elsewhere.

== Personal life ==
Pearl is married to Ben Knepler, the co-founder of True Places. They have 3 children and live in Texas.
