= Birkensnake =

American literary magazine

Birkensnake was a small press literary magazine published irregularly in Rhode Island, USA. The magazine was founded by Brian Conn and Joanna Ruocco when they were MFA students at Brown University. Birkensnake 1 was released in 2008. Birkensnake 2, published in 2009, received media attention, garnering mostly positive reviews. "The Children's Factory," a story by Michael Stewart which appeared in Birkensnake 2, won the 3rd annual Micro Award. That issue also contained stories by Matt Briggs, Caren Gussoff, and Blake Butler. Birkensnake 5, released in 2012, was a free issue. The last issue, Birkensnake 7, was published in 2014.

The magazine received positive reviews for content and format (it is available both electronically and in print). The New York Times called Birkensnake a "sacred art object."

Flavorwire listed Birkensnake 6 as "One of the Year's Coolest Literary Magazine Innovations" because it featured seven different versions of the magazine created by seven different pairs of editors.

== Staff ==
- Brian Conn, editor
- Joanna Ruocco, editor
