= List of social science fiction writers =

This is a list of social science fiction writers with their best-known works.

- Iain M. Banks - The Culture series
- Malorie Blackman - The Noughts & Crosses series
- Octavia E. Butler - Parable of the Sower
- Ray Bradbury - Fahrenheit 451
- Renee Gladman – The Ravicka series
- Robert A. Heinlein
- Aldous Huxley - Brave New World
- James Howard Kunstler - World Made by Hand
- Ursula K. Le Guin - Hainish Cycle, The Lathe of Heaven, Always Coming Home
- Stanisław Lem
- Doris Lessing - Canopus in Argos
- Lois Lowry - The Giver
- George Orwell - Nineteen Eighty Four
- Robert J. Sawyer - Neanderthal Parallax
- Boris and Arkady Strugatsky
- Yevgeny Zamyatin - We
- Isaac Asimov - Nightfall and The Foundation series
- José Saramago - Blindness
- Janusz A. Zajdel, known as "father" of Polish social science fiction
