= Seed (electronic literature) =

2017 online digital story by Joanna Walsh

SEED is an online digital story written by Joanna Walsh, a British author. Illustrations are credited to Charlotte Hicks. The work was published in April 2017 by Editions At Play with Visual Editions. The story is a mysterious and darkly beautiful tale about a young girl and her journey into becoming a woman. Readers glimpse through her eyes and read about the young eighteen year old's world and how she is just beginning to realize and come to turns with her personal desires.

== Publication history, literary significance, and critical reception ==
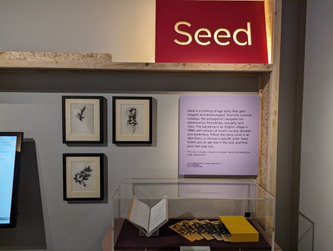
Exhibit for Seed in the British Library 2023

Seed was originally Walsh's PhD submission for her doctoral thesis at the University of East Anglia.

The story was published in April 2017 by Editions at Play with Visual Editions as a hypertext web story. This online version was shown in the British Library exhibition of Electronic Literature in 2023. In her review of the exhibition, Hillary Lamb noted that this work "encourages readers to lose themselves within a tangled thicket of text." The Irish Times reviewed the digital edition." It is an intriguing glimpse of how the reading experience might evolve in the years to come, not a million miles away from a regular E-book but in some ways qualitatively different."

This story was once again published in June 2021, by No Alibis Press, but this time as a printed book as well as a special limited edition book that was supported by the Arts Council of Northern Ireland's National Lottery Fund. Susana Crossman reviewed the press version in 3 am magazine,

Jefferson Lee compares the print and online versions in his review in Vagabond City. The London Magazine also compares the two versions, stating that "Seed too must be experienced, not paraphrased."

== Plot ==
The story grows and decays as the reader is led by the narration of a girl who is leaving her youthful ignorance and coming of age, finally entering and stumbling through womanhood during the 1980s. The story is full of poetic narrations, as the audience follows the young woman through her self-discovery. At the same time her mind dives into thoughts of desire, the anxieties of the time, small-town innocence/ ignorance, sexual desires, consciousness, memory, and growing up as well as changing.

The story is not a coming out story necessarily, but a combining of age story of a young woman who is discovering and coming to terms with desire and sexual ideas but not knowing exactly what to make of them. The online format makes the ideas easier to digest and creates a more personal experience for each individual reader. The background that follows the story helps contribute to the narration and adds and element one can only find in online literature.

== Online story structure and navigation ==
The online story greets the reader with an illustration of budding vines and a request to tap. Upon tapping you enter the world of a young woman. The story is set up relatively linear, and the reader follows the path which is illustrated by vines as they navigate the story. The story acts as a mobile game you can play through your phone or tablet, but you have the option of using other digital devices if need be. Each page shows at the bottom (below the text) how many pages are in each section as well as what page you're on. Readers can swipe left once they finish reading a paragraph to turn to the next page, following the vines that continuously grow throughout the story. Readers also have the option of different paths or vines that they can select to read. Each vine represents a certain subject eliminating the paths of ones that don't relate. Once finishing a chapter or month a new set of nodes that are represented by illustrations of flowers emerge from the shadows, until the final ending.

This narration of a young girl becoming a woman, laid out in chapters that feel as personal as a diary entry.
