= Leigh Newman =

American writer and editor (born 1971)

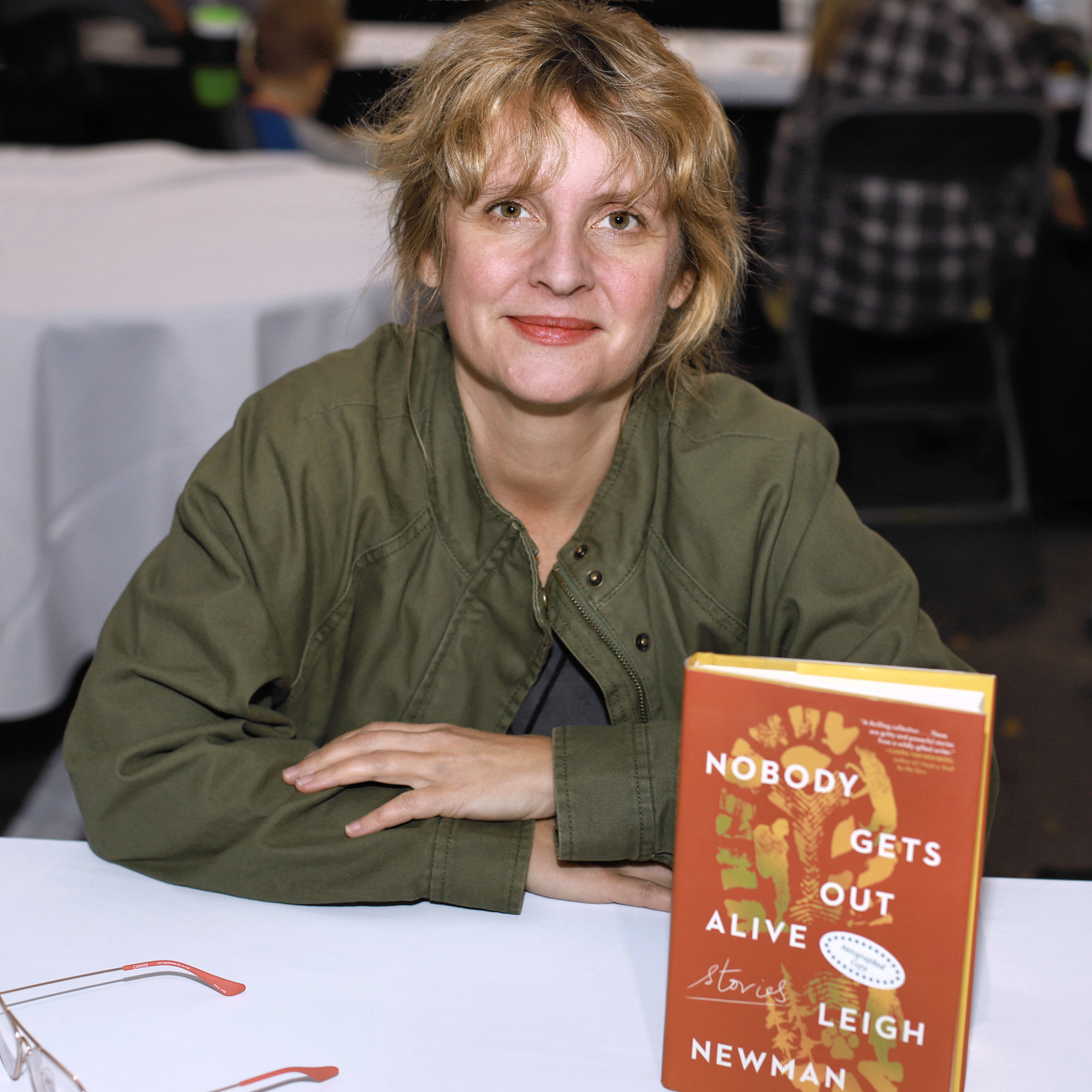
- Newman at the 2022 Texas Book Festival
- Born: May 15, 1971 (age 55); Anchorage, Alaska
- Education: Stanford University; University of Massachusetts Amherst
- Occupation: Writer
- Writing career
- Period: 2003–present
- Genres: Creative nonfiction Short stories
- Notable work: "Nobody Gets Out Alive" (2022). Still Points North (2013)
- Notable awards: Long-Listed for the National Book Award for Fiction. Long-listed for the Story Prize. Paris Review Terry Southern Prize (2020) Best American Short Stories (2020) Pushcart Prize (2020) American Society of Magazine Editors, Fiction Prize for work in the Paris Review (2020)
- Website: www.leigh-newman.com

Leigh Newman (born May 15, 1971) is an American writer. Her story collection about Alaskan women Nobody Gets Out Alive was long-listed for the National Book Award and the Story Prize. Her memoir, Still Points North, was a finalist for the National Book Critics Circle's John Leonard First Book Prize.

== Personal life ==
Newman grew up in Anchorage, Alaska and Baltimore, Maryland, traveling between the homes of her two parents. Her childhood and remote wilderness experiences were the basis of her memoir Still Points North (Dial Press, 2013). She received her B.A. from Stanford University in 1993 and her MFA from the University of Massachusetts Amherst in 2006.

== Career ==
After working primarily in nonfiction, with articles and essays in The New York Times, Vogue, Oprah.com, O, The Oprah Magazine and Bookforum, she turned to fiction. Her short stories have appeared in Harper’s, The Paris Review, One Story, Tin House, and McSweeney’s Quarterly Concern among other magazines. In 2020, her work was recognized in the Best American Short Stories, the Pushcart Prize, The American Society of Magazine Editor's fiction prize for work in the Paris Review, as well awarded the Terry Southern Prize for “humor, wit, and sprezzatura" at the Paris Review.

Newman has received fiction fellowships from the University of Massachusetts Amherst, the Atlantic Center for the Arts and the Corporation of Yaddo. In 2014, she was a Bread Loaf Writers' Conference Fellow.

== Bibliography ==
Story Collection:

- Nobody Gets Out Alive: Stories (2022, Scribner/Simon and Schuster)

=== Memoir ===
- Still Points North (2013, Dial Press)

=== Collections ===
- Nobody Gets Out Alive: Stories (2022, Simon and Schuster)
- The Collected Traveler book series (2009, Crown)
- My Parents Were Awesome (2011, Villard)
- One Ring Zero’s The Recipe Project (2011, Black Balloon) - co-editor
