= Suzanne Scanlon =

21st-century American woman writer

Suzanne Scanlon (born 1971) is an American author of fiction and non-fiction. She is known for her memoir Committed: On Meaning and Madwomen.

== Early life and education ==
Scanlon grew up in Chicago with a physician father and a nurse mother. Her mother died of cancer when she was a child. She moved to New York for her undergraduate degree, and obtained a BA in English in 1996 from Barnard College. She received a MFA+MA in Creative Writing from Northwestern University.

== Work ==
She is the author of the novels Her 37th Year, An Index and Promising Young Women. and the book Committed: On Meaning and Madwomen. She describes her experience as a psychiatric patient at a time when long-term hospitalizations were disappearing, exploring their impact on recovery. The memoir considers writers including Sylvia Plath and Janet Frame in relation to diagnosis and institutionalization.

== Reception ==
Committed: On Meaning and Madwomen received coverage from several literary and cultural publications. In The Cut, Emily Gould described the memoir as an account of psychiatric hospitalization that examines institutional authority and women’s experiences of mental illness, calling it “a deep, sometimes harrowing book about loss, grief, and the way literary representations of mental illness shaped Scanlon's experience of her own life.” A review in Los Angeles Review of Books discussed the memoir’s engagement with literary representations of madness and recovery. Chicago Reader emphasized the book’s focus on reading and writing as forms of survival and self-definition.

Scanlon’s earlier fiction has also received critical acclaim. Reviewing Her 37th Year, An Index in Chicago Tribune, Kathleen Rooney noted the novel’s experimental structure and its treatment of grief, memory, and identity.

Scanlon’s work has also been discussed in academic and performance studies contexts. Writing in PAJ: A Journal of Performance and Art, Andrea Kleine examined Her 37th Year, An Index alongside contemporary performance work, discussing its fragmented structure and autobiographical form. In Performing Autobiography: Narrating a Life as Activism, Katrina M. Powell included Scanlon among contemporary writers “performing innovative auto/biographical writing.”

== Bibliography ==
=== Fiction ===
- Promising Young Women (Dorothy, 2012) ISBN 978-0-374-14837-9
- Her 37th Year, an Index (Noemi, 2015) ISBN 978-0-374-14837-9

=== Nonfiction ===
- Committed: On Meaning and Madwomen (Vintage, 2024) ISBN 978-1-948980-13-5
