= Caren Gussoff =

American writer

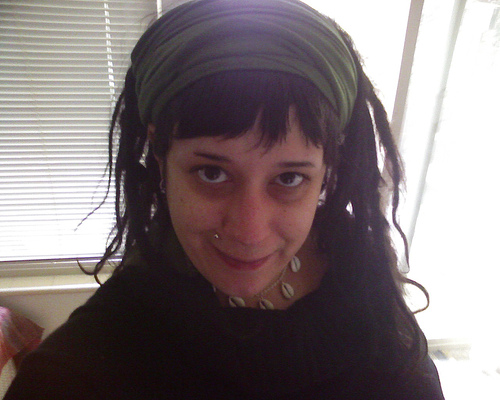
- Born: Caren Sumption Gussoff; February 16, 1973 (age 53); New York City, U.S.
- Occupations: Novelist, short story author
- Writing career
- Genres: Science fiction, fantasy

Caren Sumption Gussoff (born February 16, 1973) is an American author. She writes both literary fiction and speculative fiction novels and short stories. She currently lives outside Seattle, Washington. In 2020, Gussoff began using her married surname, Sumption, on her work, so publications appear under both Caren Gussoff and Caren Gussoff Sumption.

== Biography ==
Caren Gussoff was born in New York City and is of partial Romany descent. She attended the University of Colorado Boulder, the School of the Art Institute of Chicago, and the Clarion West Writers Workshop. At Clarion West in 2008, she was awarded The Octavia E. Butler Memorial Scholarship by the Carl Brandon Society.

Upon publication of her first novel, Homecoming (Serpent's Tail, 2000), Gussoff was nominated as a Village Voice "Writer on the Verge." Her second book, The Wave and Other Stories, contained a novella influenced by Virginia Woolf's The Waves. Her third novel, The Birthday Problem, is a post-apocalyptic science fiction story about a communicable mental illness.

Gussoff's other fiction and essays have been anthologized by Serpent's Tail, Seal Press, and Prime Books. Gussoff also authored the setting chapter of the Gotham Writers' Workshop Writing Fiction: The Practical Guide (Bloomsbury USA). In 2009, the Seattle Post-Intelligencer featured Gussoff as a "Geek of the Week."

Gussoff is lesser-known for being a Neo-Burlesque performer. From 2000 to 2005, she combined science fiction and comedy performing with the stage name, "Betty Rage."

== Major works ==
=== Novels ===
- So Quick Bright Things Come to Confusion (2023)
- Homecoming (2000)
- The Birthday Problem (2014)

=== Short story/novella collections ===
- The Wave and Other Stories (2003)
- Three Songs for Roxy (2015)
- So Quick Bright Things Come to Confusion (2022)
- in Dracula: Rise of the Beast (2018)

=== Selected anthologies ===
- Strictly Casual (2003)
- Inappropriate Random: Stories on Sex and Love (2003)
- Writing Fiction: The Practical Guide from New York's Acclaimed Creative Writing School (from the Gotham Writers Workshop, 2003)
- Tied in Knots: Funny Stories from the Wedding Day (2006)
- Fucking Daphne: Mostly True Stories and Fictions (2008)
- Destination: Future (2010)
- Daughters of Icarus (2013)
- Shades of Blue and Gray: Ghosts of the Civil War (2013)
- Handsome Devil: Tales of Sin and Seduction (2014)

=== Selected awards ===
- Winner of the Elizabeth George Award, Hedgebrook (2010)
- Winner of the Speculative Literature Foundation Gulliver Travel Grant (2009)
- Village Voice Writers on the Verge (2001)
