= Renee Gladman =

American writer

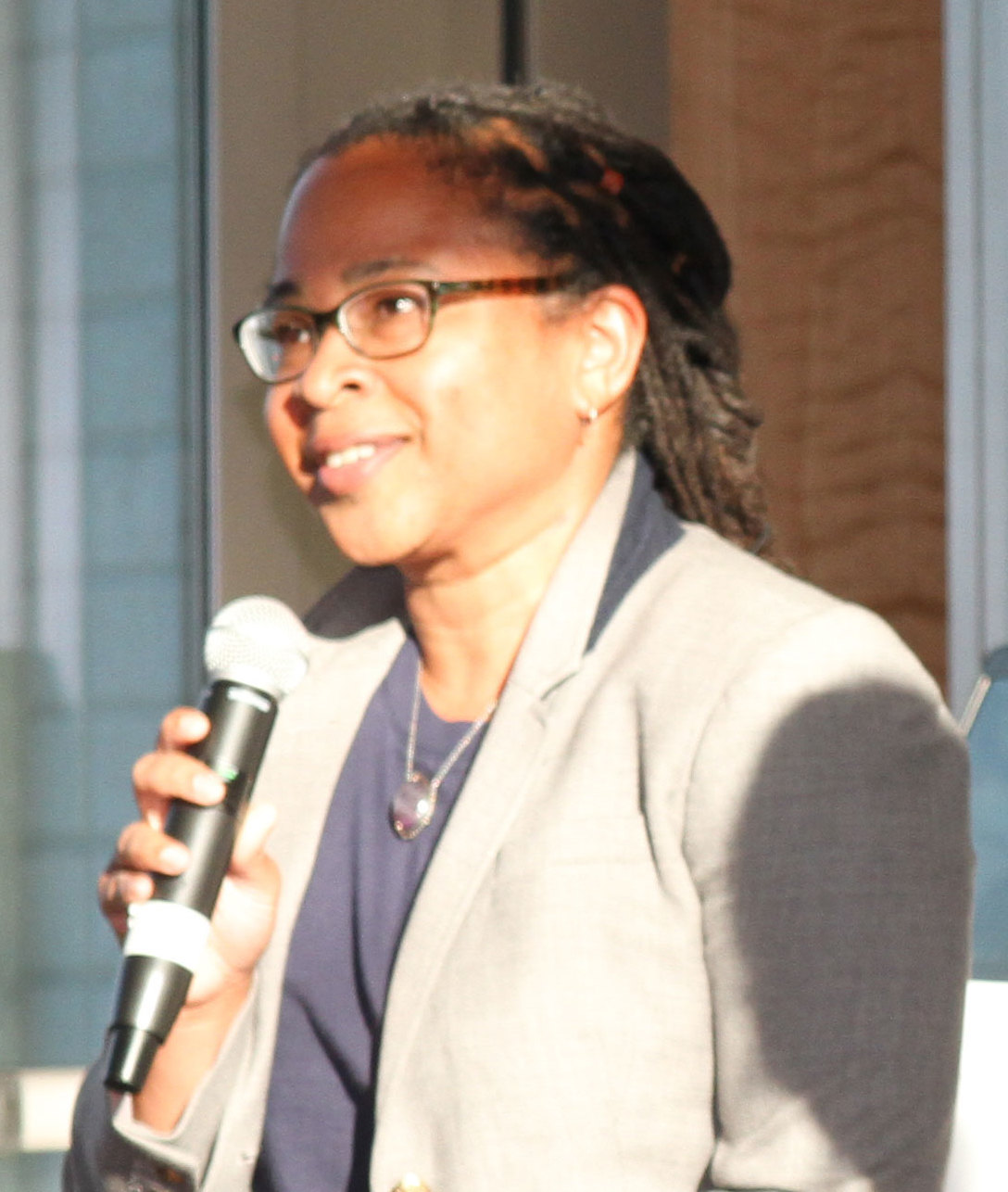
- Gladman at the 2019 Runokuu Literary Festival
- Born: 1971 (age 54–55); Atlanta, GA
- Education: Vassar College (AB); New College of California (MFA)
- Occupations: Writer; poet; artist
- Website: reneegladman.com

Renee Gladman (born 1971) is a poet, novelist, essayist, and artist who describes herself as "preoccupied with crossings, thresholds, and geographies as they play out at the intersection of poetry, prose, drawing, and architecture." Her fourteen publications include the Ravicka cycle, crime novel Morelia, essay collection Calamities, and three books of drawings, beginning with Prose Architectures.

== Life and career ==
Gladman is a graduate of Vassar College (AB, 1993), and studied poetics at the New College of California (MA, 2006). She taught creative writing at Brown University from 2006 to 2014, served as a fellow at the Radcliffe Institute for Advanced Study at Harvard, and was a 2016 Image Text fellow at Ithaca College. Her writing is associated with the New Narrative movement, characterized by writing that "tests the potential of the sentence with map-making precision and curiosity." In 2016 she was awarded a Foundation for Contemporary Arts Grant to Artists, which supported the 2017 publication of Prose Architectures. Wesleyan University's Ezra and Cecile Zilkha Gallery showed her first solo exhibition, The Dreams of Sentences, in the fall of 2022; Artists Space showed another solo show, Narratives of Magnitude, in the spring of 2023.

As a publisher, Gladman has been responsible for the zine Clamour (1996-1999), the Leroy Chapbook series (1999-2003), and the Leon Works press, a perfect bound series of books for experimental prose (2005–present).

== Prizes ==
Gladman has been the recipient of numerous literary prizes, fellowships, and awards, including a 2016 Foundation for Contemporary Arts Grant and a 2017 Lannan Foundation Writing Residency in Marfa, Texas. Her work of creative nonfiction Calamities won the 2017 CLMP Firecracker Award. In March 2021 she was awarded the Windham–Campbell Literature Prize for fiction. In 2023, Plans for Sentences was a finalist for the Hurston/Wright Legacy Award for Poetry.

== Genre and style ==
Though she is often simply described as a writer of "experimental prose," Gladman's work spans fiction and prose, personal essays, and books of poetry and visual art. She is very interested breaking down boundaries between genres. In an interview with Lucy Ives describing the differences between prose and fiction, Gladman described her desire to blur the two forms:

Fiction is interested in a certain kind of unfolding or sequence of events. Time is more intact in fiction. Prose, I think, introduces the element of the awareness of yourself in language as you are unfolding things in time and allowing yourself to be distracted or interrupted, allowing yourself to question the difficulty of what you’re doing and be stalled, not to move. I want more fiction to do this, because it changes the way we read and understand story. With fiction that repairs all doubt and interruption and experiment by being fluid, coherent; what we expect doesn’t leave much room for me as a reader. But I think the more you talk about these categories, their distinctions, the quicker they break down. Ultimately, what I want is for there to be a blur over everything.

Gladman's Ravicka cycle, four interrelated fictional books taking place in the author's invented country of Ravicka, has been compared to the fiction of Samuel Beckett, Anne Carson, and Julio Cortázar. Zack Friedman of BOMB has characterized the Ravicka series as “social science fiction,” a label that Gladman herself prefers:

I definitely would prefer social science fiction to science fiction, as I really didn’t intend these books to ask deep questions about technology or bioengineering or inter-galaxy relations. Instead, they wonder about city living, architecture, language and communication, desire, and community—the same things I wonder about in my own life. For me, it needs to stay on this side of reality... and it needs to be pushing for physical space in this world.

Gladman has described the very short essays that comprise Calamities as "ditties" because

they feel less like they’re trying to travel; there is just one point that gets made in a quick circle. It’s funny to call them essays anyway, because they fail as essays. They don’t sustain an argument, they don’t go anywhere, they don’t conclude anything, and the half-paragraph ones seem even more so, kind of absurd.

Gladman's 2017 book Prose Architectures develops Gladman's long-term interest in architecture and in the relationship between language and image in a set of drawings created through illegible script that are as visual as they are linguistic. Gladman has cited Youmna Chlala, who also both draws and writes poetry, as an inspiration.

== Personal life ==
Gladman was born in Atlanta and lives in Providence, Rhode Island, with her partner Danielle Vogel, a poet and ceramicist.

== Publications ==
=== Poetry ===
- A Picture-Feeling (2005)

=== Prose ===
- Arlem (1994)
- Juice (Kelsey Street Press, 2000)
- The Activist (KRUPSKAYA, 2003)
- Newcomer Can't Swim (Kelsey Street Press, 2007)
- To After That (Toaf) (Atelos, 2008)
- Morelia (Solid Objects, 2019)
- My Lesbian Novel (Dorothy, a publishing project, 2024)
- Theory for Moving Houses (Wave Books, 2026)

==== Ravicka novels ====
- Event Factory (Dorothy, a publishing project, 2010)
- The Ravickians (Dorothy, a publishing project, 2011)
- Ana Patova Crosses a Bridge (Dorothy, a publishing project, 2013)
- Houses of Ravicka (Dorothy, a publishing project, 2017)

=== Art ===
- Prose Architectures (Wave Books, 2017)
- One Long Black Sentence (with Fred Moten, Image Text Ithaca Press, 2020)
- Plans for Sentences (Wave Books, 2022)

=== Essays ===
- Calamities (Wave Books, 2016)
