= Joanna Ruocco =

American novelist

- Education: Brown University (MFA); University of Denver (PhD)

Joanna Ruocco is an American author and was a co-editor of the fiction journal Birkensnake and serves as the Chair of the Editorial Board of Fiction Collective Two.

In 2011, Ruocco was the winner of the Catherine Doctorow Innovative Fiction Prize for Another Governess / The Least Blacksmith. In 2013, she received the Pushcart Prize for her story "If the Man Took". Ruocco received her MFA at Brown, and a Ph.D. in creative writing from the University of Denver. She also serves as professor in creative writing at Wake Forest University.

Ruocco publishes romance novels as Joanna Lowell, and has also written under the pseudonyms Toni Jones and, with Radhika Singh, Alessandra Shahbaz.

== Works ==
=== As Joanna Ruocco ===
- The Mothering Coven (Ellipsis Press, 2009)
- The Baker's Daughter (Mud Licious Press, 2009)
- Man's Companions (Tarpaulin Sky Press, 2010)
- A Compendium of Domestic Incidents (Noemi Press, 2011)
- Another Governess / The Least Blacksmith (FC2, 2012)
- Dan (Dorothy, 2014)
- The Boghole & the Beldame (The Lune, no. 12, 2016)
- Field Glass, with Joanna Howard (Sidebrow Press, 2017)
- The Whitmire Case (Astrophil Press, 2017)
- The Week (The Elephants, 2017)

=== As Alessandra Shahbaz ===
- Ghazal in the Moonlight (Random House India, 2009)
- Midnight Flame (Red Sage, 2012)

=== As Toni Jones ===
- No Secrets in Spandex (Simon & Schuster, 2012)

=== As Joanna Lowell ===
- Dark Season (Simon & Schuster, 2016)
- The Duke Undone (Berkley Books, 2020)
- The Runaway Duchess (Berkley Books, 2021)
- Artfully Yours (Berkley Books, 2023)
- A Shore Thing (Berkley Books, 2024)
- A Rare Find (Berkley Books, 2025)
