= Jen George =

American writer

Jen George is an American writer. She was born in Thousand Oaks, California. She grew up in a large family, in economically constrained circumstances. She now lives in New York City.

George is the writer of the short story collection The Babysitter at Rest (2016). In 2017, she was named by Granta magazine as one of the best young writers in the United States. Her work has appeared in n+1, BOMB, and Harper's.
