= Joanna Walsh =

British author and critic (b. 1970)

- Born: Joanna Margaret Walsh; UK
- Occupations: Writer, editor, artist
- Notable work: Break.up, Seed, Vertigo, Girl Online, My Life as a Godard Movie, Hotel
- Website: https://www.joannawalsh.ie/

Joanna Walsh is an Irish-English multidisciplinary writer, editor and artist. She lives in Dublin, Ireland.

== Works and reviews ==
Her books include

- Fractals (2013),
- Vertigo (2015), shortlistee, Edge Hill Short Story Prize,
- Hotel (2015),
- Grow a Pair, (2015)
- Worlds From the World's End (2017),
- Seed, online edition (2017), honoree, Lovie Awards: honoree, Webby Awards
- Break.up (2018), winner, UK Arts Foundation Fellowship.
- My Life as a Godard Movie, (2022)
- Seed, print edition and artist's book (2022)
- Girl Online, (2022)
- Miss-Communication, (2022), winner, Markievicz Award. This work is a combination of a generative AI and a printed book of responses.
- Autobiology. (2023)

She created the digital narratives, Seed, which featured in the British Library's Digital Storytelling Exhibit June 2, 2023 through October 15, 2023,Miss-Communication, for which she won the Markievicz Award in the Republic of Ireland, and the feast, which was exhibited at Dublin's Douglas Hyde Gallery in June 2024. Seed and Miss-Communication are also published as print books.

She was fiction editor and contributing editor at 3AM Magazine from 2014 to 2018, and creative non-fiction editor at Catapult from 2015 to 2018. She has also edited two editions of Hamish Hamilton's Five Dials magazine, and the essay collection Under the Influence (Gorse Editions).

From 2014 to 2018, she created and ran the intersectional feminist online campaign @read_women, and from 2019 to 2024 the Twitter-based campaign challenging ageism in the arts, @noentry_arts. She was co-founder of the Warwick Prize for Women in Transl ation.

Her short stories have been widely anthologised in books and journals including the Dalkey Archive's Best European Fiction, Granta Magazine, Sleek, and her essays in TANK, Gorse, the Los Angeles Review of Books and others.

Her artworks have been performed/shown at venues including PHI Montreal, Sample Studios Cork and Beta Festival Dublin.

From 2023-2-25 she was an MSCA postdoctoral fellow at NUI Maynooth.

She wrote a monthly fashion column, Theory of Style, for Spike Art Magazine, Berlin from 2023-2025.

== Awards ==
- 2017 Edge Hill Prize shortlist for Vertigo.
- 2017 Arts Council England grant for Seed-story.com
- 2017 UK Arts Foundation Fellow in Creative Non-Fiction.
- 2018 Anthony Burgess Centenary Fellowship, University of Manchester.
- 2019 Webby Award Honoree for Seed-story.com.
- 2020 The Markievicz Award, Arts Council Ireland.
- 2021 Centre Culture Irelandais residency.
- 2022 Cité Internationale des Arts, Paris residency.
- 2022 Literature Bursary, Arts Council Ireland.
- 2023 Marie Skłodowska-Curie Actions (MSCA) Postdoctoral Fellowship, NUI Maynooth.
- 2024 Electronic Literature Awards honorable mention for Girl Online.
- 2024 DAAD Artists-in-Berlin Program (refused).

== Bibliography ==
- Fractals (2013), Paris: 3:AM Press, ISBN ISBN 978-0-9926842-0-4.
- Shklovsky's Zoo (2015), London: A Piece of Paper Press, no ISBN.
- Vertigo (2015), Saint Louis: Dorothy, a Publishing Project / Dublin: Tramp Press.
- Hotel (2015) New York: Bloomsbury Literary Studies, ISBN ISBN 978-1-62892-473-2.
- Grow a Pair (2015), Berlin: Readux, ISBN ISBN 978-3-944801-38-4.
- Seed (2017), London: Visual Editions, digital novel.
- Worlds from The Word's End (2017), Sheffield: And Other Stories, ISBN ISBN 978-1-911508-10-6
- Hasard Objectif (2018), London: Goldsmiths Press, no ISBN.
- Break.up: A Novel in Essays (2018), Pasedena: Semiotext(e), ISBN ISBN 978-1-63590-014-9 / London: Tuskar Rock, ISBN ISBN 978-1-78125-993-1.
- Seed, print novel and artist's book (2021), Belfast: No Alibis Press, ISBN ISBN 978-1-8381081-0-6.
- My Life as a Godard Movie (2021), Milan: Juxta / (2022), Oakland: Transit, ISBN ISBN 978-1-945492-64-8.
- Girl Online: A User Manifesto (2022), London: Verso, ISBN ISBN 978-1-83976-535-3.
- Miss-Communication (2022), London: JOAN, ISBN ISBN 978-1-9993276-4-4.
- Autobiology (2022), Lawrence, KS: Inside the Castle.
