= Sokcho =

City in Gangwon, South Korea

- Municipal city
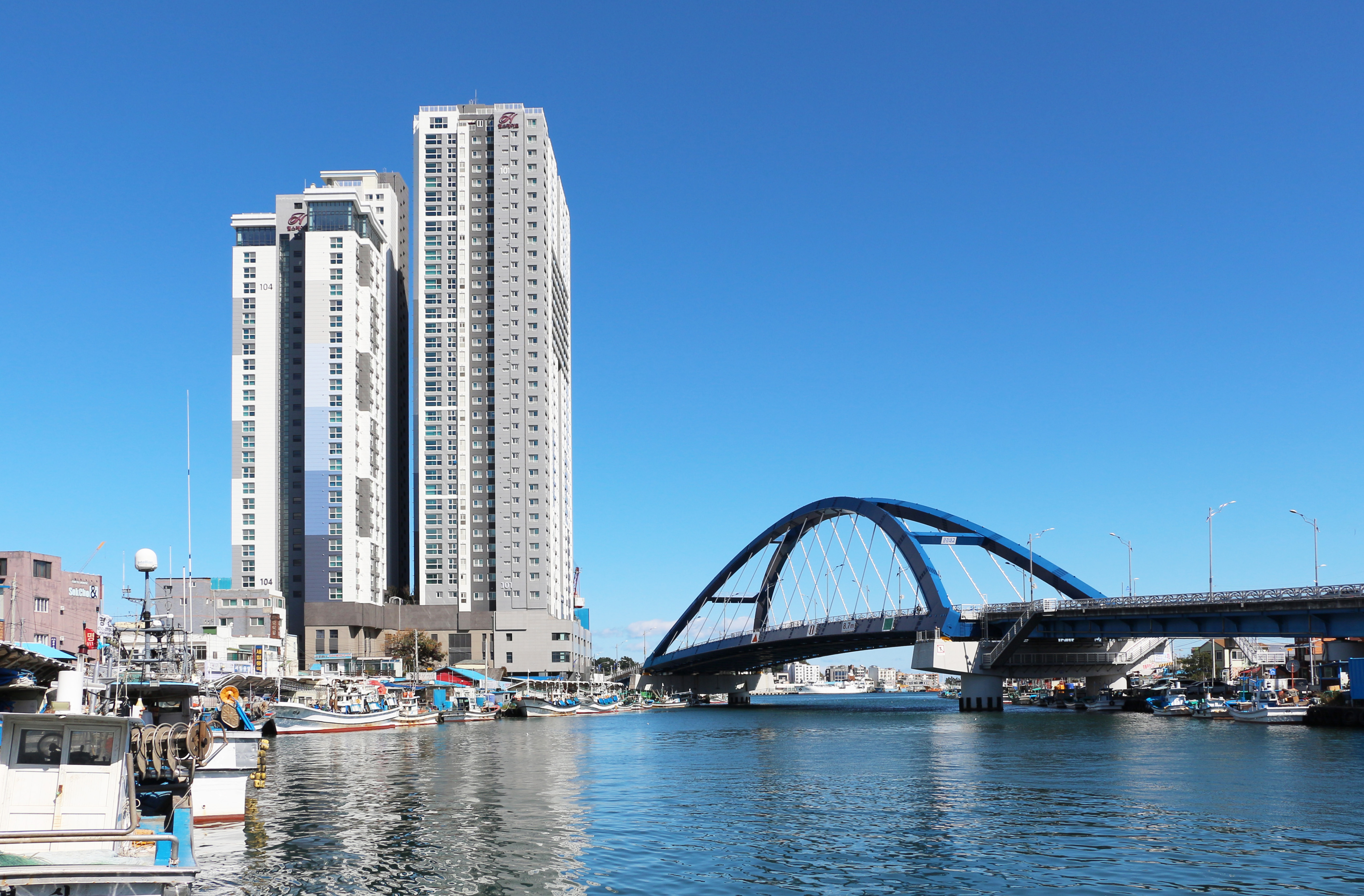
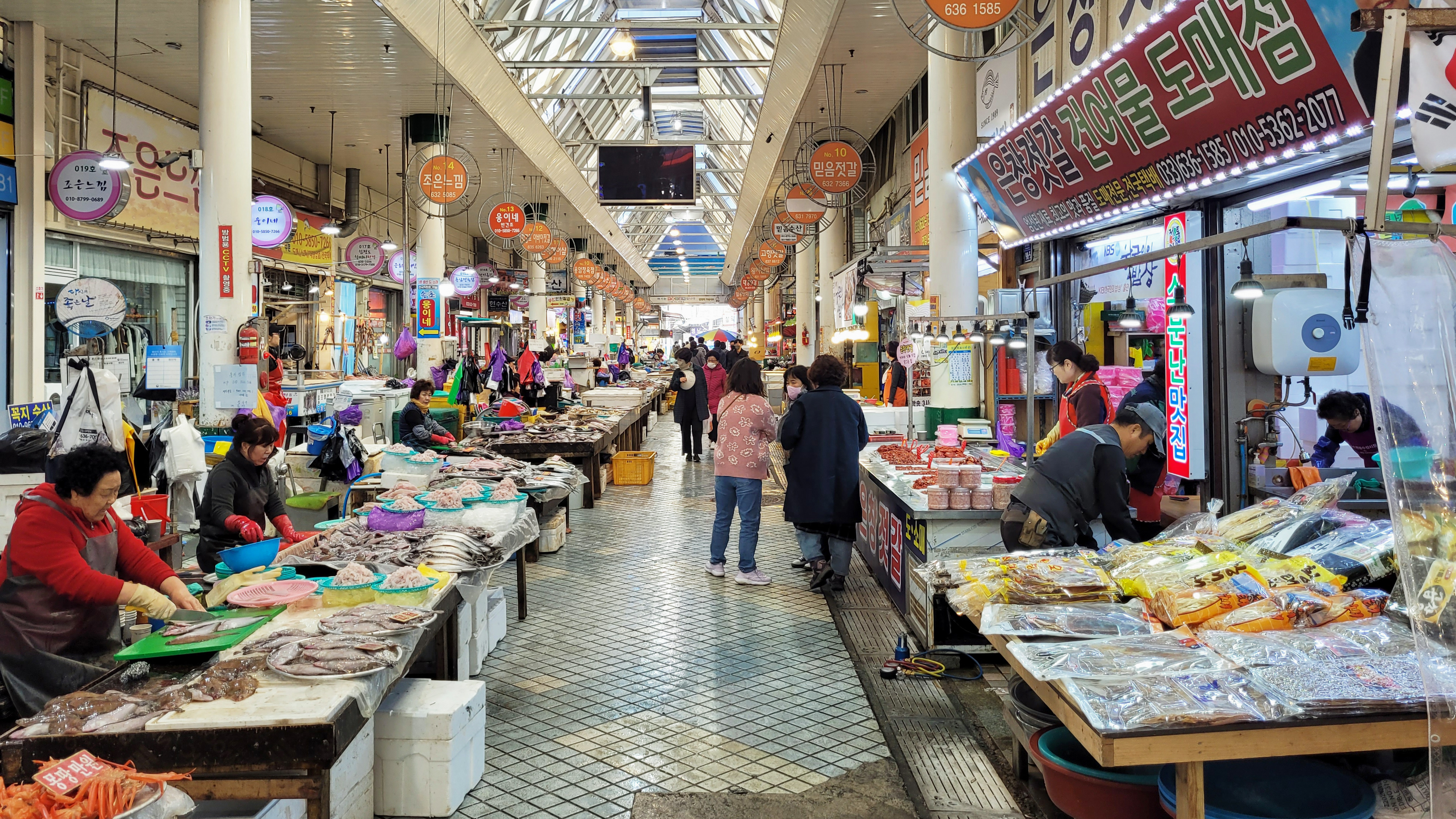
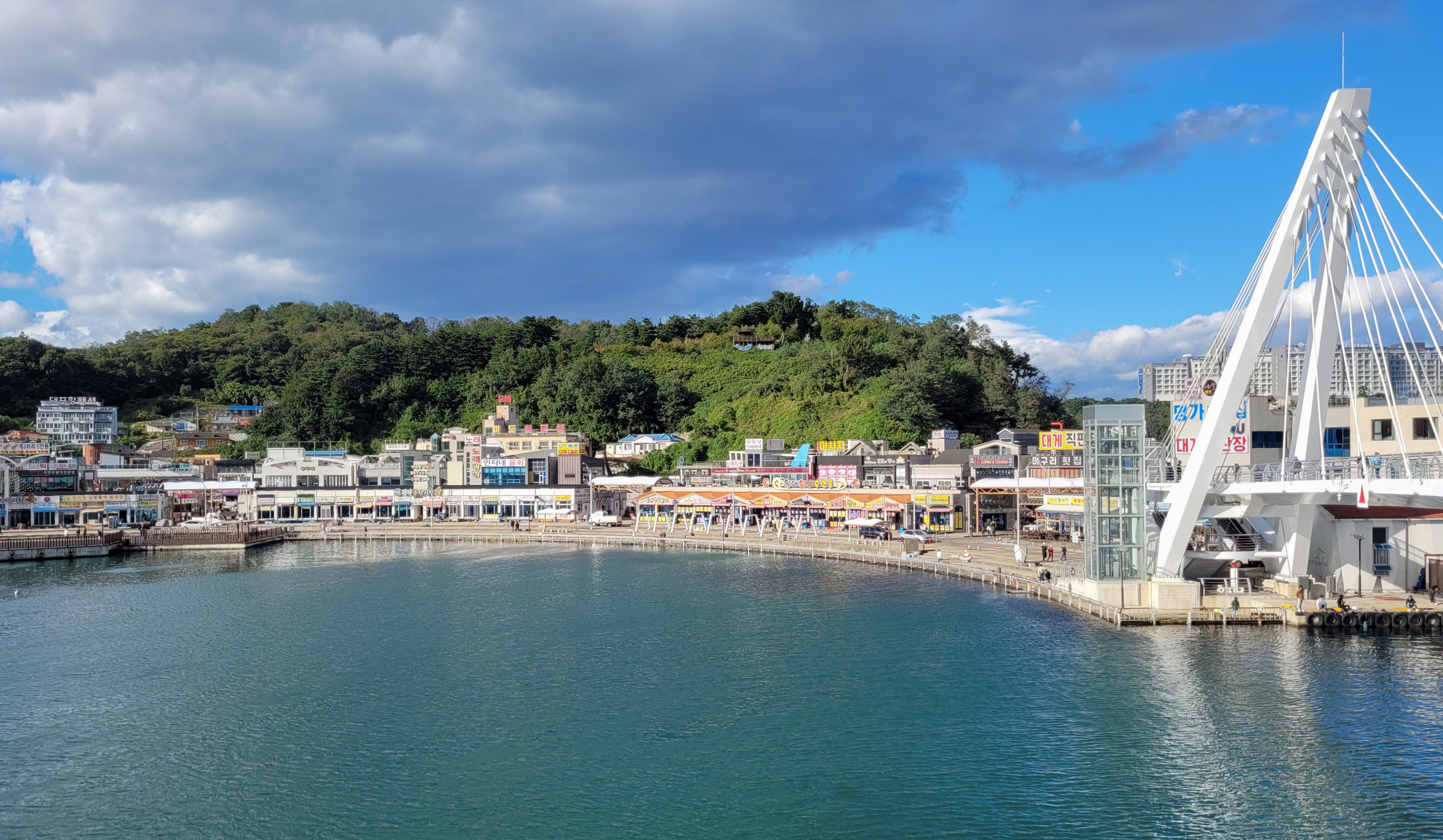
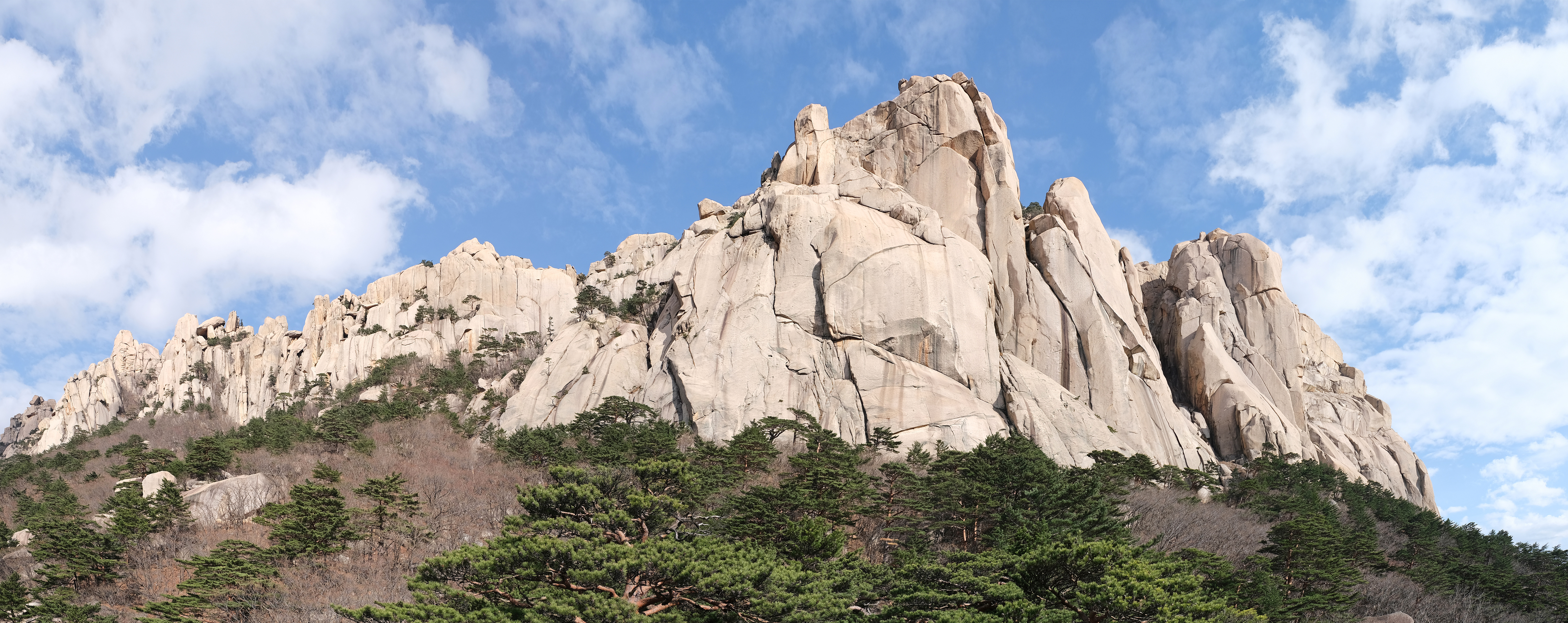
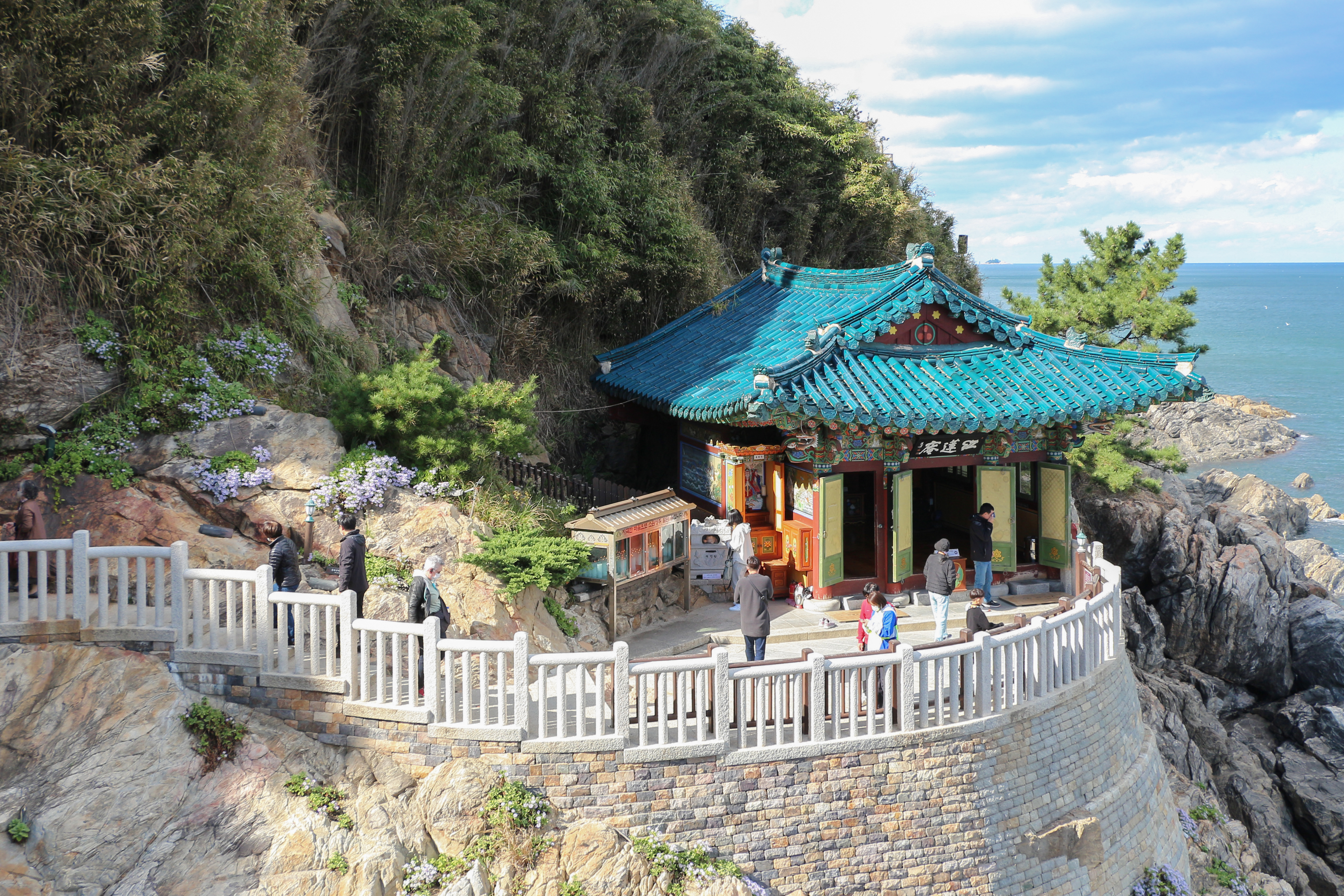
- From the left: Geumgang Bridge, Sokcho Central Market, Daepo Port, Ulsanbawi, and Naksansa

- Flag

- Location in South Korea
- Coordinates: 38°12′25″N 128°35′31″E
- Country: South Korea
- Province: Gangwon
- Administrative divisions: 10 dong

Area
  - Total: 105.76 km^{2} (40.83 sq mi)

Population (September 2024)
  - Total: 81,164
  - Density: 850/km^{2} (2,200/sq mi)
- Climate: Cfa

Korean name
- Hangul: 속초시
- Hanja: 束草市
- RR: Sokcho-si
- MR: Sokch'o-si

Sokcho (Korean: 속초; Korean pronunciation: [sʰok̚.tɕʰo]) is a city and major tourist hub located in the northeast of the South Korean province of Gangwon.

== History ==
When the Korean peninsula was divided into two countries following World War II, Sokcho was placed under North Korean control, before being captured by the South Korean army on August 18, 1951. Since the Korean Armistice Agreement (1953), it has been a part of South Korea.

== Tourism ==
=== Lakes ===
Sokcho is home to two lakes, Yeongnang Lake and Cheongchoho.

Daepo harbour is in Daepo-dong, Sokcho. Its attractions include a sea fountain and beach cable car.

=== Festivals ===
In 1999, the Gangwon International Tourism Expo was held in Sokcho.

In July 2016, Sokcho became one of the few locations in South Korea where Pokémon Go could be played due to government restrictions on mapping data. Players flocked to the city, causing public transport tickets to sell out.

Sokcho is the site of the Seorak Cultural Festival.

== Infrastructure ==
=== Station ===
The opening of KTX Gyeonggang Line has made it convenient for travellers to visit Gangwon Province, a 86-minute train ride from Seoul.

=== Stadium ===
- Sokcho Stadium

== Climate ==
Sokcho straddles the line between a humid subtropical climate (Köppen: Cfa) and a humid continental climate (Köppen: Dfa).

Climate data for Sokcho (1991–2020 normals, extremes 1968–present)
Month	Jan	Feb	Mar	Apr	May	Jun	Jul	Aug	Sep	Oct	Nov	Dec	Year
Record high °C (°F)	15.8 (60.4)	19.1 (66.4)	26.9 (80.4)	32.5 (90.5)	34.4 (93.9)	35.3 (95.5)	37.1 (98.8)	38.7 (101.7)	34.1 (93.4)	29.9 (85.8)	27.5 (81.5)	17.8 (64.0)	38.7 (101.7)
Mean daily maximum °C (°F)	4.2 (39.6)	6.0 (42.8)	10.6 (51.1)	16.5 (61.7)	20.9 (69.6)	23.5 (74.3)	26.7 (80.1)	27.5 (81.5)	24.0 (75.2)	19.5 (67.1)	13.1 (55.6)	6.6 (43.9)	16.6 (61.9)
Daily mean °C (°F)	0.1 (32.2)	1.9 (35.4)	6.3 (43.3)	11.9 (53.4)	16.3 (61.3)	19.8 (67.6)	23.4 (74.1)	24.1 (75.4)	20.1 (68.2)	15.1 (59.2)	8.8 (47.8)	2.5 (36.5)	12.5 (54.5)
Mean daily minimum °C (°F)	−3.8 (25.2)	−2.2 (28.0)	1.8 (35.2)	7.3 (45.1)	12.1 (53.8)	16.5 (61.7)	20.6 (69.1)	21.2 (70.2)	16.5 (61.7)	10.8 (51.4)	4.7 (40.5)	−1.5 (29.3)	8.7 (47.7)
Record low °C (°F)	−16.4 (2.5)	−16.2 (2.8)	−11.6 (11.1)	−3.5 (25.7)	3.8 (38.8)	6.6 (43.9)	12.6 (54.7)	13.7 (56.7)	9.5 (49.1)	−0.3 (31.5)	−8.7 (16.3)	−14.9 (5.2)	−16.4 (2.5)
Average precipitation mm (inches)	43.5 (1.71)	45.9 (1.81)	52.3 (2.06)	73.3 (2.89)	88.5 (3.48)	119.5 (4.70)	265.6 (10.46)	298.0 (11.73)	200.6 (7.90)	87.9 (3.46)	92.0 (3.62)	40.1 (1.58)	1,407.2 (55.40)
Average precipitation days (≥ 0.1 mm)	5.8	5.9	8.3	8.6	9.3	11.5	15.7	15.2	11.7	7.0	7.9	4.7	111.6
Average snowy days	5.0	5.1	4.1	0.2	0.0	0.0	0.0	0.0	0.0	0.0	0.7	2.2	17.3
Average relative humidity (%)	49.0	53.2	58.0	60.5	68.6	78.7	82.2	82.3	77.8	65.6	56.0	47.9	65.0
Mean monthly sunshine hours	185.4	176.9	194.9	211.9	216.3	172.4	146.3	152.4	166.8	189.8	169.0	184.3	2,166.4
Percentage possible sunshine	60.0	56.4	51.4	53.7	48.9	36.8	30.6	35.9	44.2	54.2	55.4	61.4	47.8
Source: Korea Meteorological Administration (snow and percent sunshine 1981–2010)

== Sister cities ==
- Jeongeup, North Jeolla Province since June 13, 1996
- Jung District, Seoul since January 22, 1997
- Gresham, Oregon, United States since June 23, 1985
- Taitung County, Taiwan since April 16, 1992
- Hunchun, Jilin, People's Republic of China since August 22, 1994
- Yonago, Tottori, Japan since October 18, 1995
- Khasansky, Primorsky Krai, Russia since July 19, 1996
- Nyūzen, Toyama, Japan since October 3, 1996
- Sakaiminato, Tottori, Japan since April 9, 2002
- Partizansk, Primorsky Krai, Russia

== Gallery ==
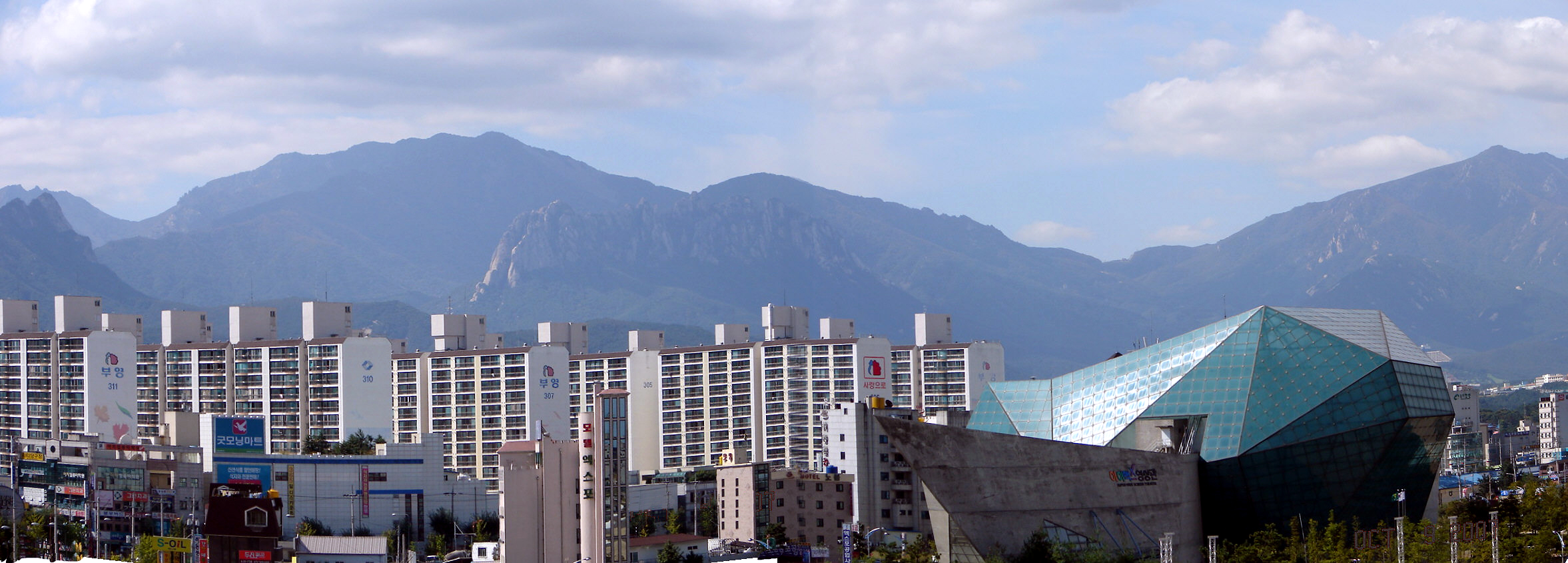
Seorak Mountains adjacent to Sokcho

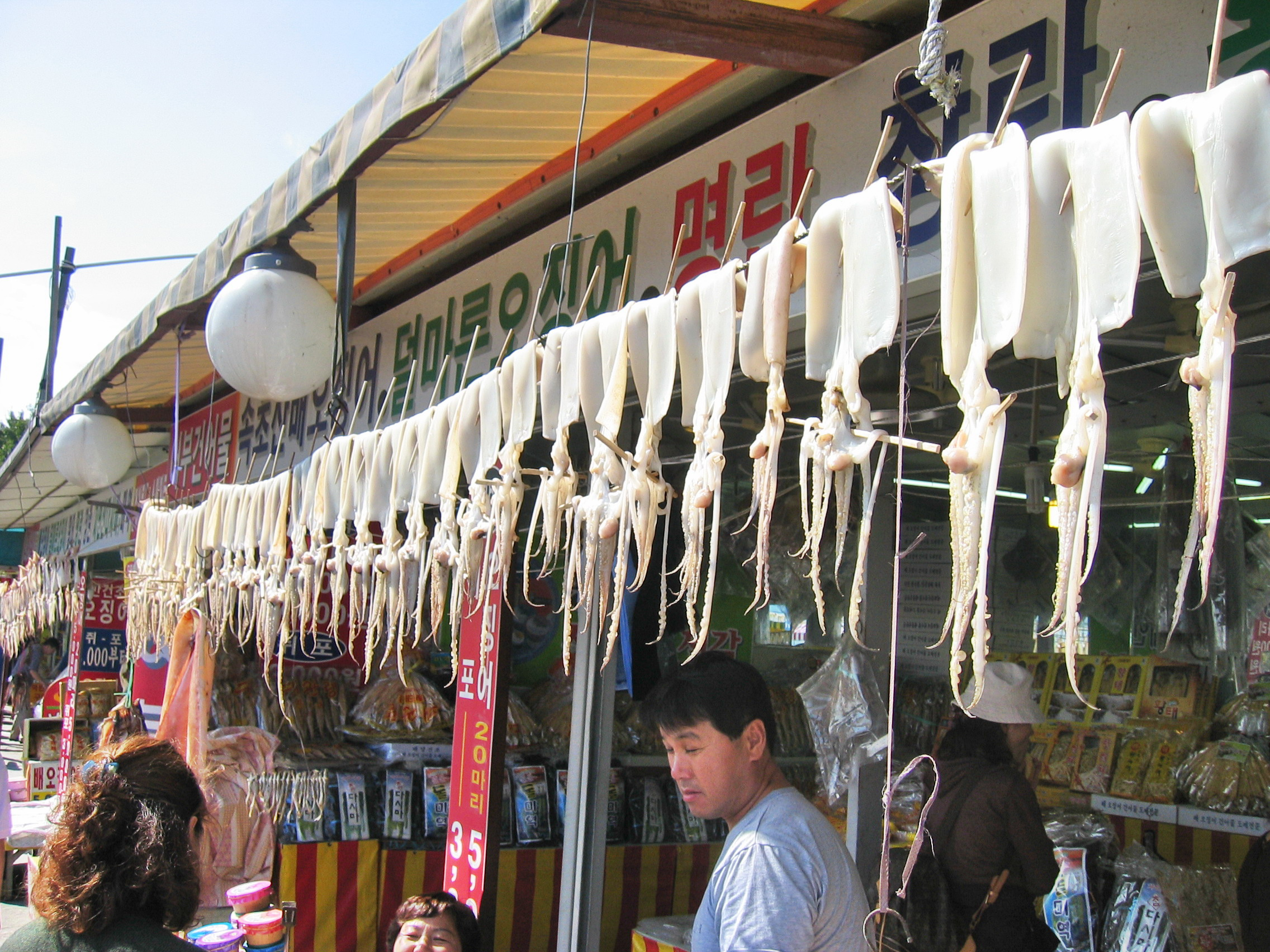
Squid drying at the Taepo Fish Market in Sokcho

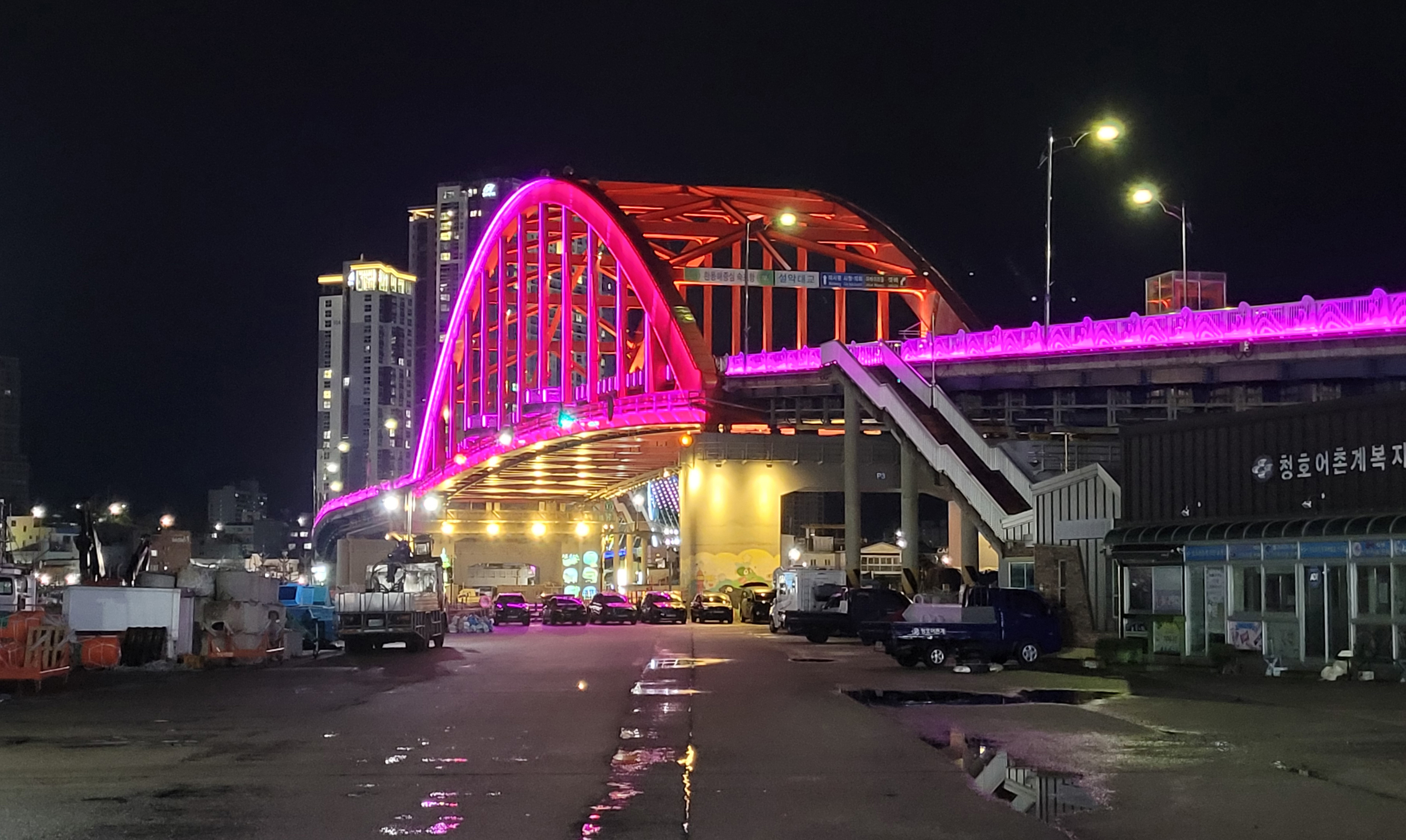
Sinsuro Arched Bridge over Lake Cheongchoho in Sokcho

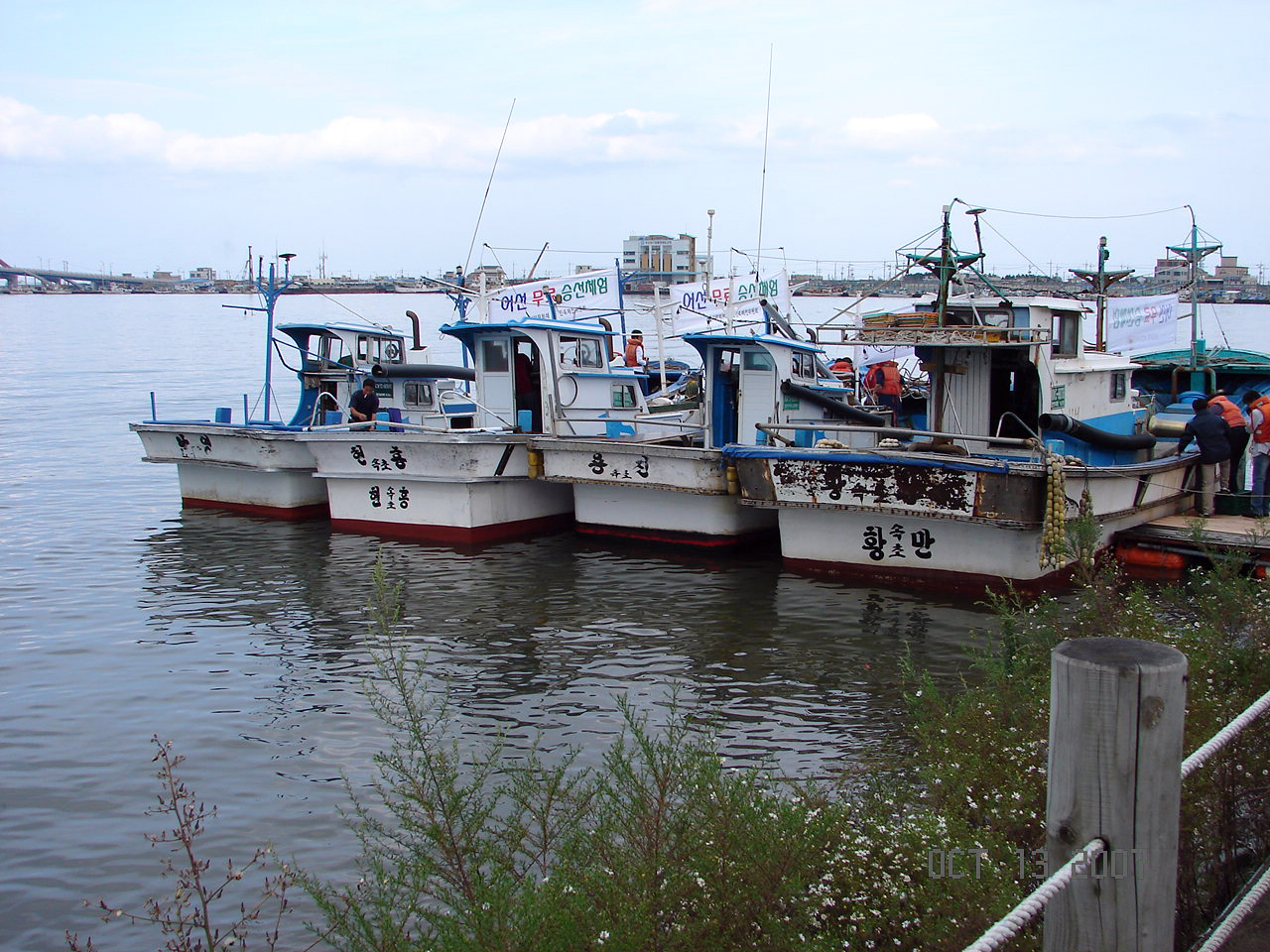
Squid boats on Lake Cheongchoho in Sokcho

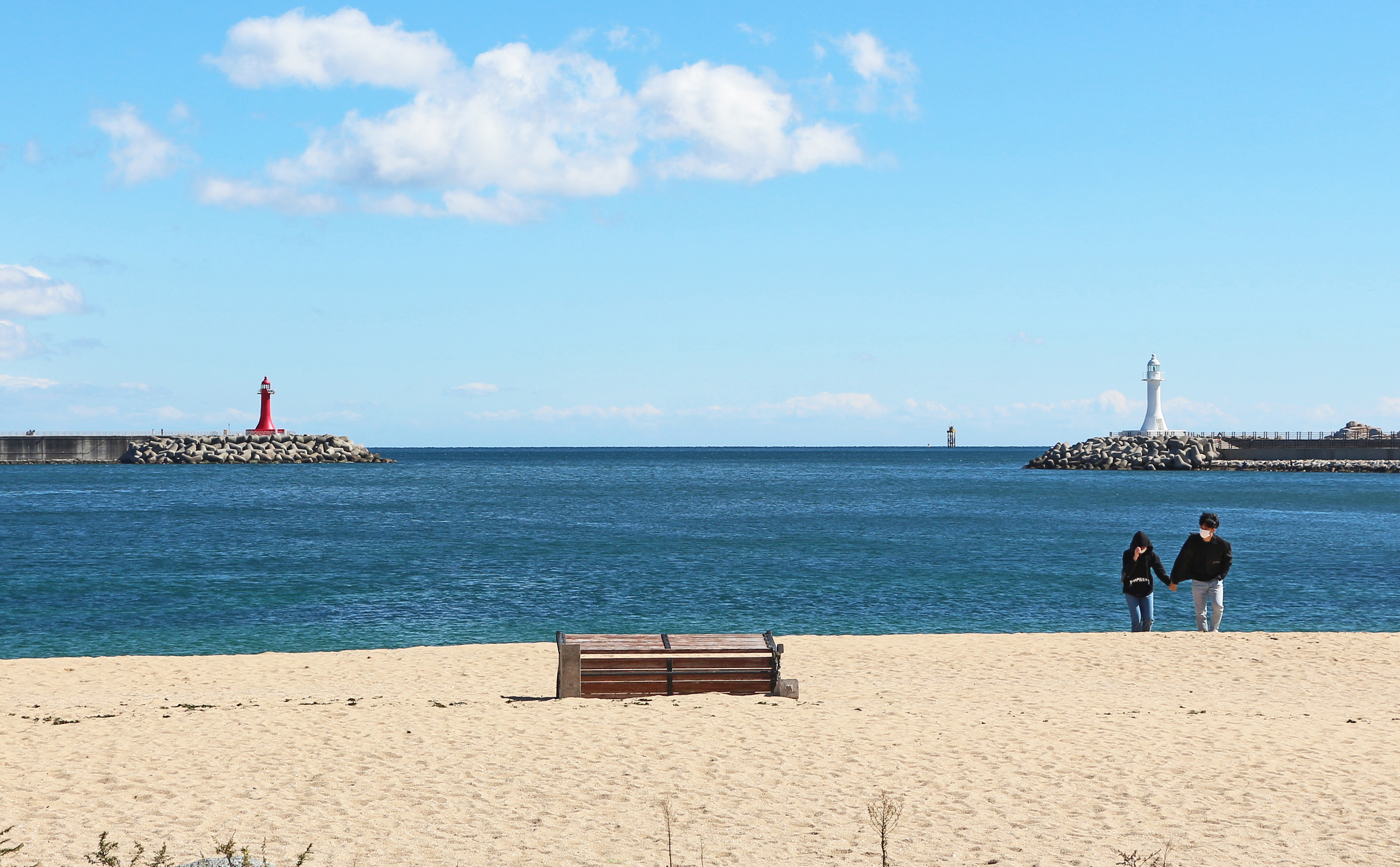
Cheongho Beach

Sokcho Beach

Cheoksan Hot Springs

== Notable people from Sokcho ==
- Shin Ye-eun (신예은), a South Korean actress
- Park Kwang-su (박광수), a South Korean filmmaker
- Kim Kang-min (김강민), a South Korean actor under the label of Mystic Story
- Monday (birth name: Kim Ji-min, 김지민), member of K-pop group Weeekly
- D1 (birth name: Jang Dong-il, 장동일), leader of DKB (band)

== In literature ==
The novel Winter in Sokcho, by Elisa Shua Dusapin, which won the National Book Award for Translated Literature in 2021, takes place in Sokcho. It was subsequently adapted into the 2024 film Winter in Sokcho by director Koyo Kamura.

== See also ==
- Seorak Cultural Festival
- List of cities in South Korea
- Dae Jo-yeong (TV series)
