= Winter in Sokcho (film) =

2024 French drama film directed by Koya Kamura

- Film poster
- Directed by: Koya Kamura
- Written by: Koya Kamura; Stéphane Ly-Cuong
- Based on: Winter in Sokcho by Elisa Shua Dusapin
- Produced by: Fabrice Préel-Cléach; Yoon-Seok Nam
- Starring: Bella Kim; Roschdy Zem
- Cinematography: Élodie Tahtane
- Edited by: Antoine Flandre
- Music by: Delphine Malausséna
- Production companies: Offshore; Keystone Films
- Release date: 8 September 2024 (TIFF)
- Running time: 104 minutes
- Country: France
- Languages: Korean; French

Winter in Sokcho (French: Hiver à Sokcho) is a French drama film, directed by Koya Kamura and released in 2024. Adapted from the novel of the same title by Elisa Shua Dusapin, the film stars Bella Kim as Sooha, a young woman working at a guest house in Sokcho, South Korea, whose routines in life are disrupted when French tourist Kerrand (Roschdy Zem) comes to town, triggering Sooha's memories of her own estranged French father.

== Cast ==
- Bella Kim as Sooha
- Roschdy Zem as Yan Kerrand
- Park Mi-Hyeon as Sooha's Mother
- Ryu Tae-Ho as Mr. Park
- Gong Doyu as Joon-oh
- Choi Hwan-i
- Jung Kyung-Soon as the aunt

== Release ==
The film premiered in the Platform Prize program at the 2024 Toronto International Film Festival. It was subsequently screened in the New Directors program at the 72nd San Sebastián International Film Festival.

== Reception and awards ==
The film competed at the 8th Malaysia International Film Festival in competition section in July 2025, where Park Mi-Hyeon was awarded Best Supporting Actress.

Koya Kamura won Best Director award at Bergamo Film Meeting 2025.

At the 2025 Galway Film Fleadh, the film won the World Cinema competition.
