= Seorak Cultural Festival =

- Hangul: 설악문화제
- Hanja: 雪嶽文化祭
- RR: Seorak munhwaje
- MR: Sŏrak munhwaje

The Seorak Cultural Festival is a local cultural festival annually in late October in Sokcho, Gangwon Province, South Korea.

== Gallery ==
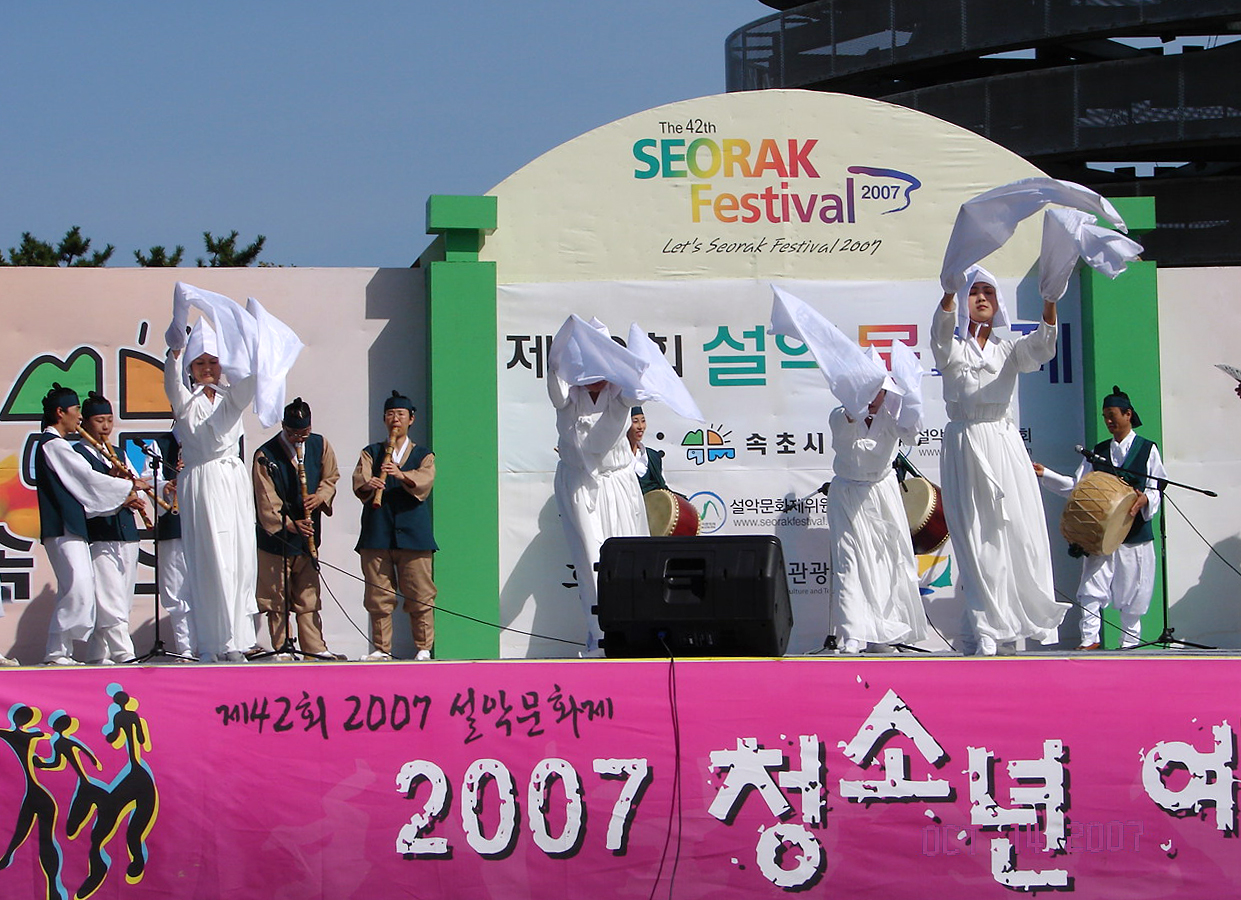
Bukcheong sajanori, a performance at the Seorak Festival

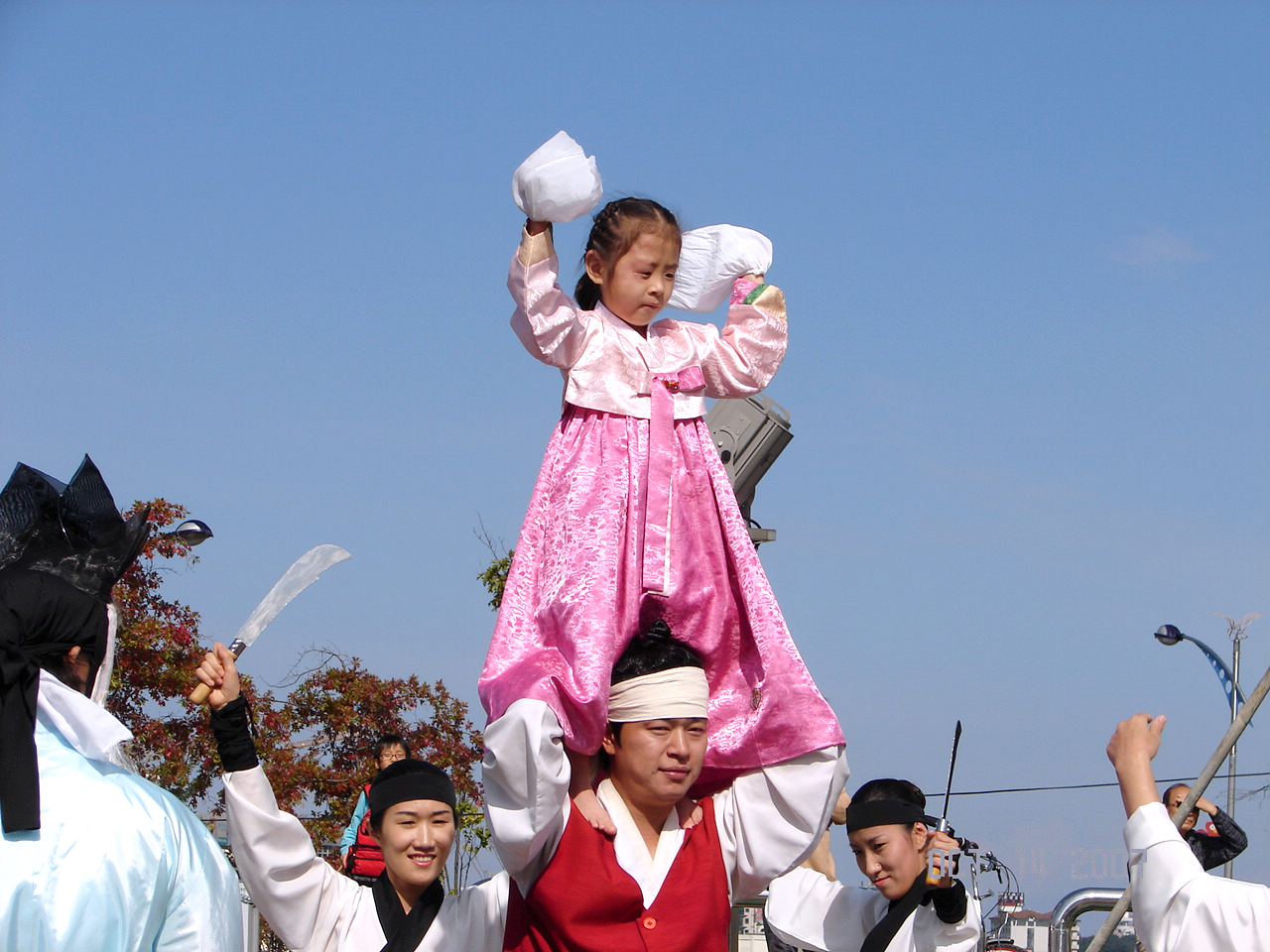
Bukcheong sajanori

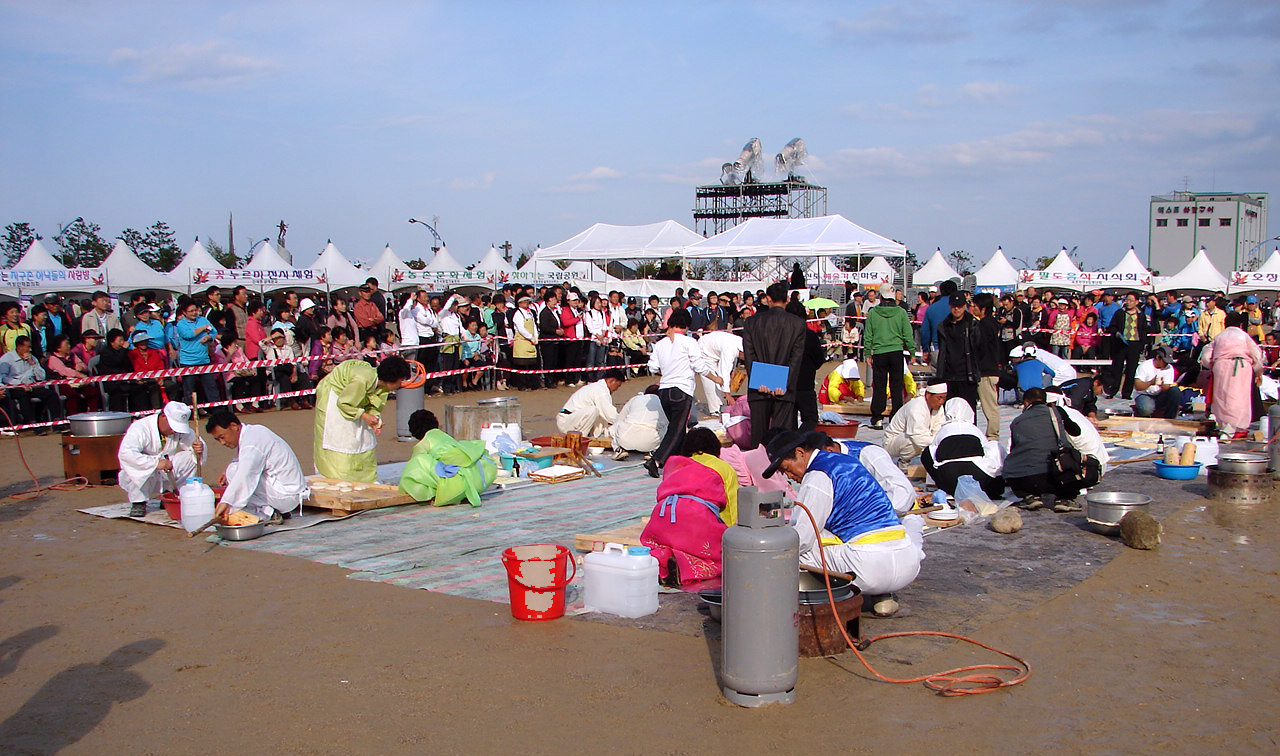
Tteok (Korean rice cake) making contest at the Seorak Festival

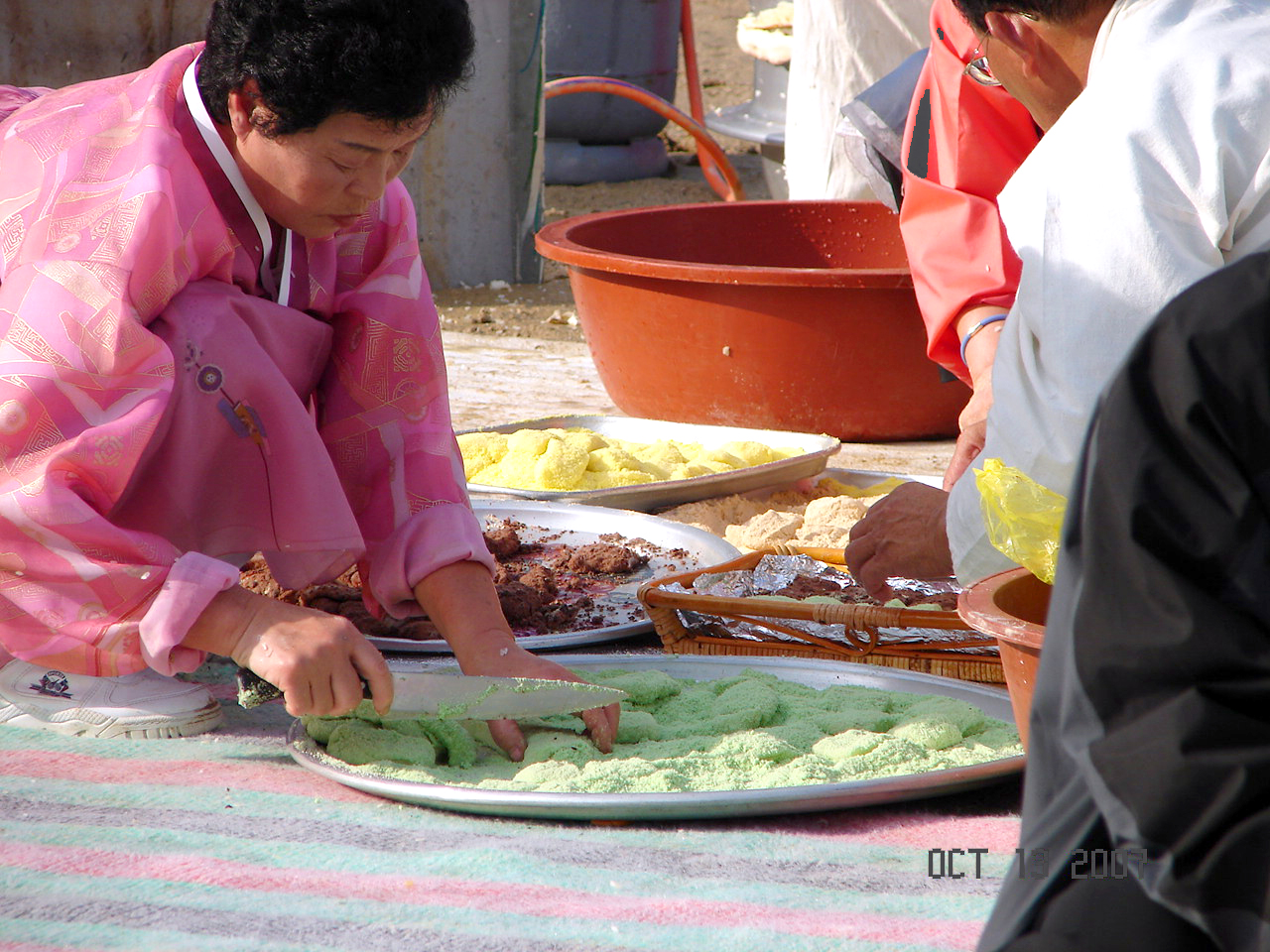
Tteok making contest

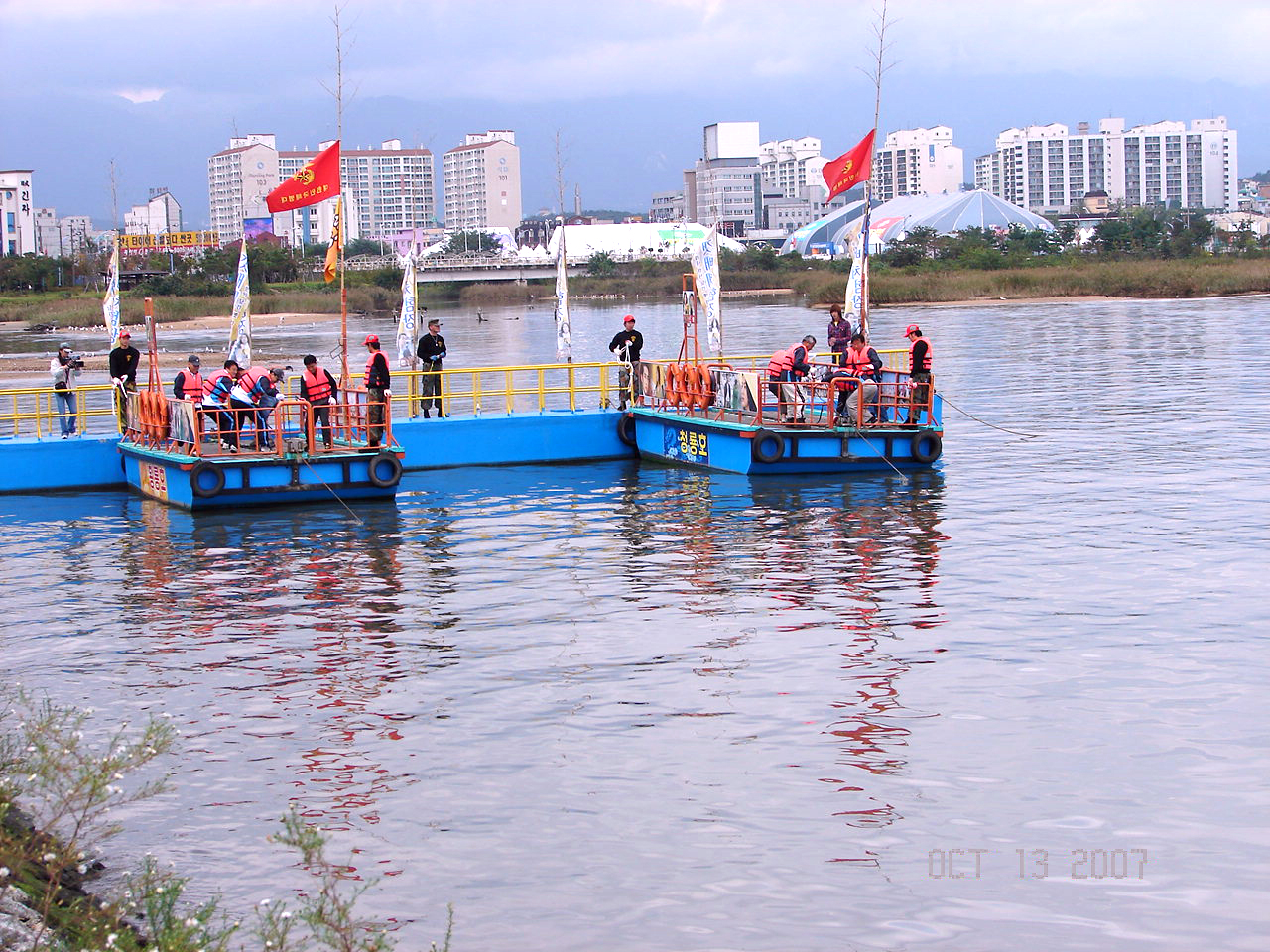
Start of the raft race at the Seorak Festival

== See also ==
- List of festivals in South Korea
