= Yeongnang Lake =

Lake in Sokcho, South Korea

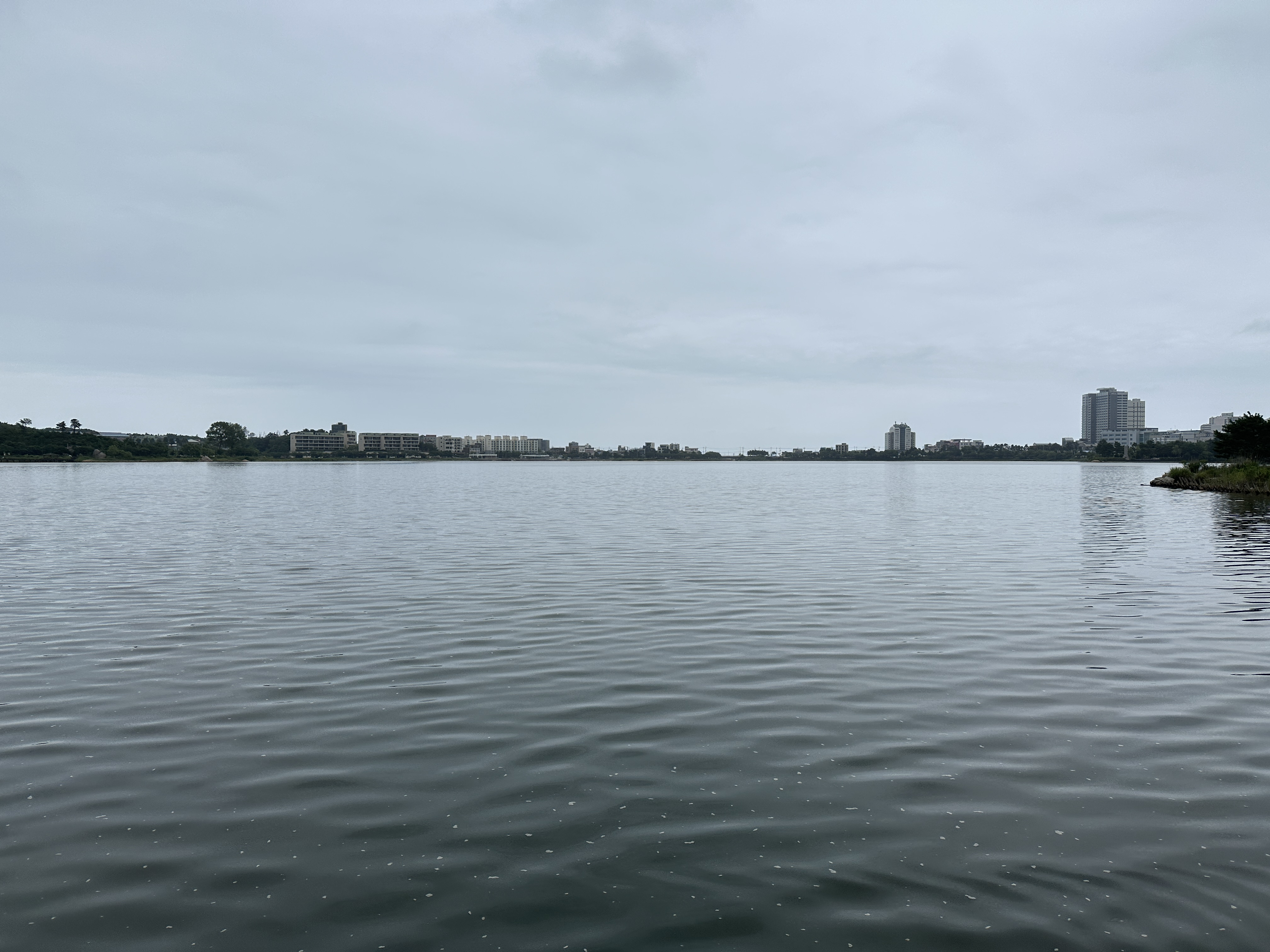
- Part of the lake (2026)
- Coordinates: 38.2172°N 128.5804°E
- Website: yeongrang-lake.co.kr

Korean name
- Hangul: 영랑호
- Hanja: 永郎湖
- RR: Yeongnangho
- MR: Yŏngnangho

Location
- Interactive map of Yeongnang Lake

Yeongnang Lake (Korean: 영랑호), sometimes romanized Yeongrang Lake, is a lake in Sokcho, South Korea.

The lake is popular for golfing, fishing, boating, and water skiing. It is a major tourist destination in the area. There are many cherry blossom trees planted around the lake.

There is a pontoon bridge in the middle of the lake. In 2024, it was ordered that the bridge be removed for environmental concerns.
