= Winter in Sokcho =

Novel by Elisa Shua Dusapin

Winter In Sokcho
- Author: Elisa Shua Dusapin
- Translator: Aneesa Abbas Higgins
- Language: French
- Genre: Fiction
- Published: 2016 (French), 2021 (Open Letter) (English)
- Publisher: Open Letter
- ISBN: 9-781-94883-0416

Winter in Sokcho (French: Hiver à Sokcho) is the first novel by Swiss-Korean writer Elisa Shua Dusapin published in 2016. It was translated by Aneesa Abbas Higgins into English in 2021. The story follows the interactions of the narrator and a French comic writer during the writer's visit to Sokcho in search for inspiration.

Winter in Sokcho, a film adaptation by director Koya Kamura, premiered in the Platform Prize program at the 2024 Toronto International Film Festival.

== Plot ==
Winter in Sokcho begins at a guesthouse located in Sokcho, South Korea, a fishing town which dies during the colder months due to less traffic from tourists. The story is told through the eyes of the narrator, an unnamed woman of French-Korean descent, who introduces the reader to Yan Kerrand, a French graphic novelist looking for inspiration for his latest story. Kerrand checking into the guesthouse is the start of their tense, uncomfortable, borderline romantic/sexual acquaintanceship.

The narrator agrees to help this foreigner find the inspiration he needs for his next comic within Sokcho, even though she believes there is nothing to find. She takes him through the city, to the North Korean border, and along the beaches, trying to show him her home through her eyes, yet Kerrand constantly denies trying the local cuisine or doing things as the locals do. Through all this, the narrator cannot pull herself away from this strange man and becomes obsessed with the drawings he makes when he thinks nobody is watching. She does several questionable things like rummaging through his bag and trash, using his toothpaste, and spying on him secretly.

Simultaneously, the narrator is also struggling in her relationships with her mother and her boyfriend Jun-oh. Her mother cannot seem to see her daughter as a grown adult, while the narrator tries to separate herself from her mother without abandoning her entirely. Her boyfriend only seems to be attracted to the narrator sexually, which is distressing because of the narrator's extreme body dysmorphia. She eventually ends the relationship between them.

The book wraps up quite suddenly, after Kerrand agrees to eat one of the narrator's meals. When the narrator takes the meal to his room, she leafs through Kerrand's sketchbook, and finds a woman with a scar on her leg just like her.

== Major characters ==
Unnamed Narrator: A 24 year old French-Korean woman who works as a receptionist at a guesthouse narrates Winter in Sokcho. She continually defies societal expectations, particularly regarding marriage and self image, by breaking up with her long-distance boyfriend and resisting her mother's urges of plastic surgery. Even so, she struggles deeply with her body image and goes through bouts of disordered eating, including starving and binging eating. It is also revealed that she has a complicated non-relationship with her French father, which proves to be problematic when she develops a crush on a Frenchman who is staying at the guesthouse where she works.

Kerrand: The love interest's name in Winter in Sokcho is Yan Kerrand. It is mentioned soon after the narrator meets Kerrand that he looks to be old enough to be her father. He is a comic book artist from Normandy who has come to Sokcho in search of inspiration for a last comic in his current series. Kerrand and the narrator begin spending time together because of her willingness to take him places such as the border dividing North Korea and South Korea. Kerrand is noticeably averse to Korean cuisine and spicy food in general, reflecting the divide between Korean and French cultures.

Narrator's mother: The narrator's mother works at the fish market in Seoul and has an impressive reputation among residents because she is licensed to prepare fugu (pufferfish) which is fatal if improperly prepared. It is well known in the area that the narrator was conceived as a result of an affair between her mother and a Frenchman who abandoned them, which causes tension on both characters involved. The narrator's mother is inconsistent regarding the way she talks about the narrator's image. One day she encourages the narrator to eat more and the next she suggests that the narrator get plastic surgery.

Jun-Oh: Jun-oh is the narrator's boyfriend who is pursuing his dreams of being a model by attending modeling school in Seoul. Their relationship becomes increasingly dull as the narrator realizes the extent of his vanity, for example, when Jun-Oh proclaims that he would be willing to get plastic surgery if it meant he would be hired as a model. This, combined with her interest in Kerrand, causes the narrator to eventually break up with Jun-oh.

Old Park: the owner of the guesthouse. He puts pressure on the narrator regarding her duties at the guest house and is notoriously grumpy

== Themes ==
Sokcho on a Map

Reoccurring themes in Winter in Sokcho include self image, identity crisis, and vulnerability. The narrator's perception of her body is an inner struggle throughout the book; she frequently mentions that she goes periods of up to days without eating and then gorges herself when she is around her mother. These descriptions indicate that the narrator struggles with bulimia and body dysmorphia. Her heritage also proves to be a consistent struggle because she has a French lineage that she cannot get answers about as a result of being abandoned by her French father. This is supported by her refusal and inadequate feelings about speaking French with Kerrand, even though she admits to herself that her French is likely better than her English because she studied French at a university. The abandonment of her father is also a complicated factor within the narrator's attraction to Kerrand, as she recognizes that Kerrand has the age and background to be her father, but she feels a romantic attraction to him as well. The location of Sokcho is also symbolic to a feeling of self divide because it is so close to the border of a divided nation. These contribute to an overarching theme of self crisis and sense of not belonging. Vulnerability is a factor for both the narrator and Kerrand, as they are both reserved in manner. The narrator's constant observation of Kerrand's drawings is her way of trying to understand him and his inner thoughts. The two characters have flirtatious interactions, but nothing manifests out of them largely because of a combined fear of vulnerability.

== Translations ==
After first being published in French in 2016, Winter in Sokcho was translated and published into six languages.

- November 30, 2016, the Korean translation of Winter in Sokcho (Korean: 속초에서의 겨울) was published.
- September 14, 2018, the Spanish translation of Winter in Sokcho (Spanish: Un Invierno en Sokcho) was published.
- September 14, 2018, the German translation of Winter in Sokcho (German: Ein Winter in Sokcho) was published.
- January 1, 2019, the Portuguese translation of Winter in Sokcho (Portuguese: Inverno em Sokcho) was published.
- February 20, 2020, the English translation of Winter in Sokcho was published.
- January 1, 2021, the Polish translation of Winter in Sokcho (Polish: Zima w Sokcho) was published.

== Awards, honors, and recognition ==
Winter in Sokcho received positive critical attention in France. The novel received the 2016 Prix Robert Walser. The following year, Winter in Sokcho was awarded the 2017 Prix Régine Desforges. Aneesa Abbas Higgins' English translation of Winter in Sokcho won the 2021 National Book Award for Translated Literature.
