= Elisa Shua Dusapin =

Franco-Korean writer

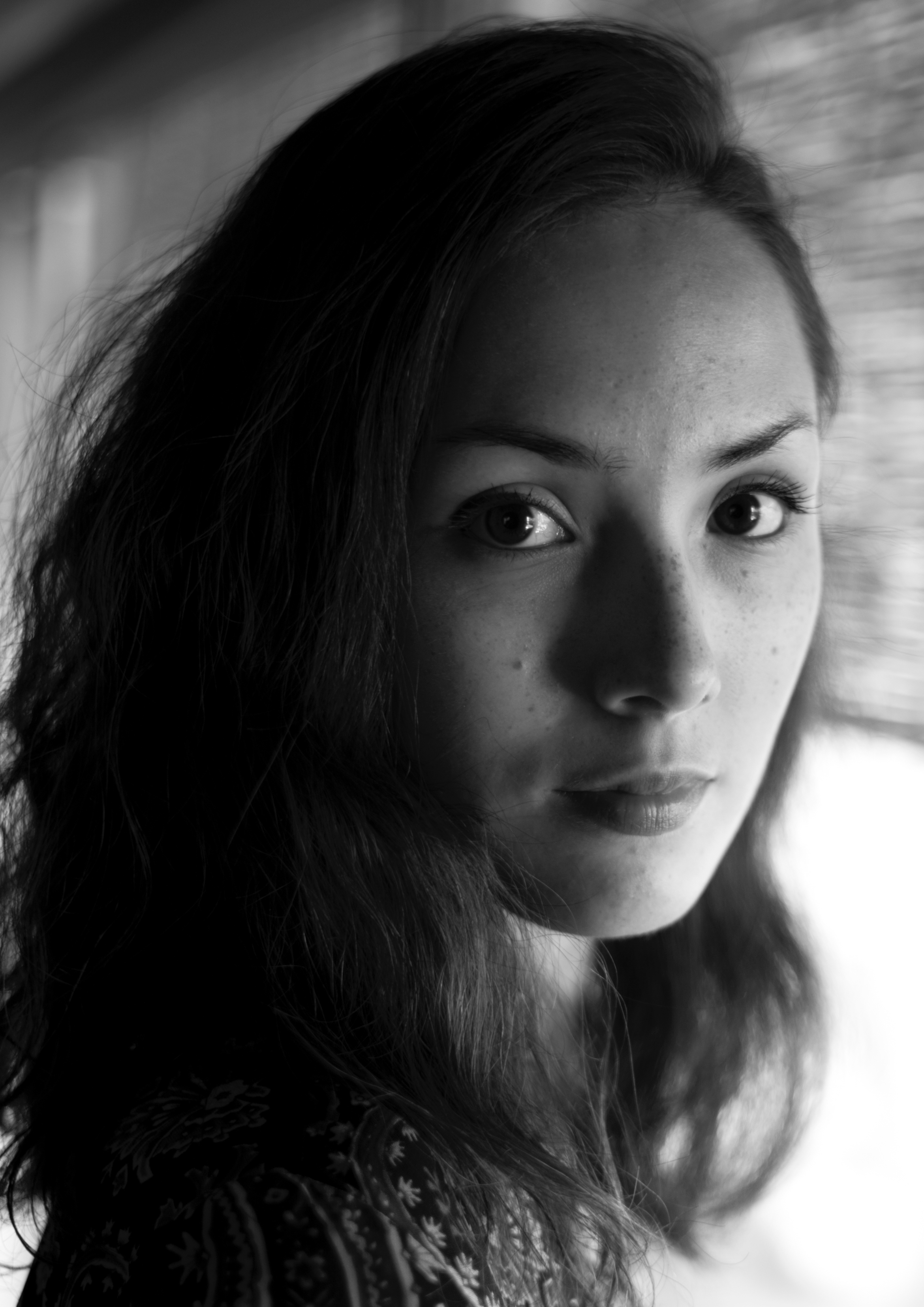
- Born: October 23, 1992 (age 33); Sarlat-la-Canéda
- Notable work: Winter in Sokcho

Elisa Shua Dusapin (born 23 October 1992 in Sarlat-la-Canéda, France) is a Franco-Swiss writer, with Korean origins through her mother, currently living in Switzerland.

== Career ==
She studied at the Swiss Literary Institute. In 2016, Elisa Shua Dusapin published her first novel, Hiver à Sokcho, which won numerous awards, including the National Book Award for Translated Literature, the Prix Robert-Walser, Prix Alpha and the Prix Régine-Deforges. In 2024, the novel was adapted into the film Winter in Sokcho by the Franco-Japanese director Koya Kamura.

Her second novel, Les Billes du Pachinko, was published in 2018.

== Bibliography ==
Novels

- Hiver à Sokcho (2016). Winter in Sokcho, trans. Aneesa Abbas Higgins (Daunt Books, 2020; Open Letter Books, 2021).
- Les Billes du Pachinko (2018). The Pachinko Parlour, trans. Aneesa Abbas Higgins (Daunt Books/Open Letter Books, 2022).
- Vladivostok Circus (2020). Trans. Aneesa Abbas Higgins (Daunt Books/Open Letter Books, 2024).
- Le vieil incendie (2023). The Old Fire, trans. Aneesa Abbas Higgins (Summit Books, 2026).

Novellas and tales

- "C'était une nuit de fièvre" (2011). Published in Contes et Nouvelles (Prix Interrégional Jeunes Auteurs).
- "Les Ursulines" (2017). Published in Addict Culture.
- "L’œil sans paupière" (2018). Published in Le Temps.
- Le Colibri (2022)

Musicals

- M'sieur Boniface (2015)
- Olive en bulle (2018)

Other

- Le regard du Lièvre (2018), photos by René Lièvre with text by Elisa Shua Dusapin

== Awards and honors ==
- 2016: Prix Robert-Walser for Hiver à Sokcho
- 2017: Prix Régine Desforges for Hiver à Sokcho
- 2019: Prix suisse de littérature for Les Billes du Pachinko
- 2021: National Book Award for Translated Literature for Winter in Sokcho, translated from the French by Aneesa Abbas Higgins
- 2023: Prix Wepler for Le vieil incendie
- 2023: Prix Fénéon for Le vieil incendie
