= Canton of Romilly-sur-Seine-1 =

Coordinates: 48°31′10″N 3°43′35″E

The Canton of Romilly-sur-Seine-1 is a former canton of the arrondissement of Nogent-sur-Seine, in the Aube department, in northern France. It had 9,558 inhabitants (2012). It was disbanded following the French canton reorganisation which came into effect in March 2015. It consisted of 12 communes:

- Crancey
- La Fosse-Corduan
- Gélannes
- Maizières-la-Grande-Paroisse
- Origny-le-Sec
- Orvilliers-Saint-Julien
- Ossey-les-Trois-Maisons
- Pars-lès-Romilly
- Romilly-sur-Seine (partly)
- Saint-Hilaire-sous-Romilly
- Saint-Loup-de-Buffigny
- Saint-Martin-de-Bossenay
