= Avon-la-Pèze =

Commune in Grand Est, France

- Commune
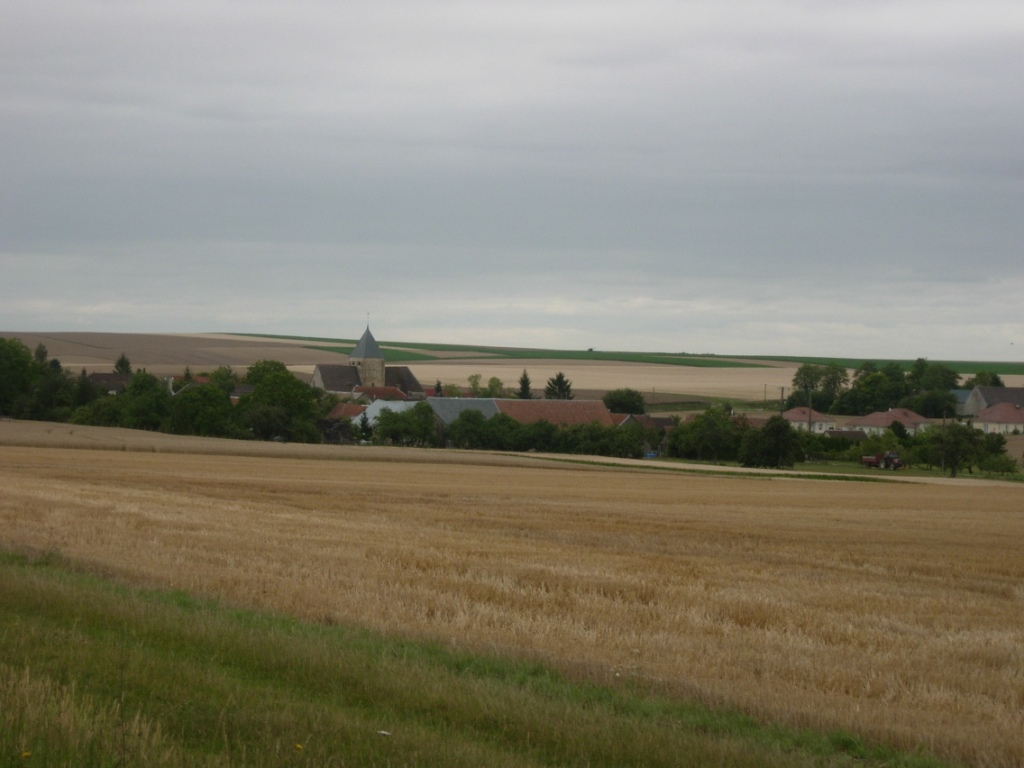
- A general view of Avon-la-Pèze
- Location of Avon-la-Pèze
- Location within France Location within Grand Est
- Coordinates: 48°23′23″N 3°39′18″E
- Country: France
- Region: Grand Est
- Department: Aube
- Arrondissement: Nogent-sur-Seine
- Canton: Saint-Lyé
- Intercommunality: CC Orvin Ardusson

Government
  - Mayor (2020–2026): Frédéric Hazouard
- Area^{1}: 12.7 km^{2} (4.9 sq mi)
- Elevation: 140 m (460 ft)
- Population (2023): 211
  - Density: 16.6/km^{2} (43.0/sq mi)
- Time zone: UTC+01:00 (CET)
  - Summer (DST): UTC+02:00 (CEST)
- INSEE/Postal code: 10023 /10290
- ^{1} French Land Register data, which excludes lakes, ponds, glaciers > 1 km^{2} (0.386 sq mi or 247 acres) and river estuaries.

Avon-la-Pèze (French pronunciation: [avɔ̃ la pɛz]) is a commune in the Aube department in the Grand Est region of north-central France.

== Geography ==
Avon-la-Pèze is located some 30 km north-west of Troyes and 17 km south by south-west of Romilly-sur-Seine. Access to the commune is by road D440 from Rigny-la-Nonneuse in the north which passes through the centre of the commune and the village before continuing south to Marcilly-le-Hayer. The D23 comes from Avant-les-Marcilly in the north-west passing west through the commune and the village and continuing to Saint-Lupien in the south-east. The D16 branches off the D23 east of the village and goes north-east to Marigny-le-Châtel. There is the hamlet of La Pezé to the north of the village. There is a large forest to the west of the village (the Bois de la Garenne) and the rest of the commune is farmland.

== Administration ==
List of Successive Mayors

From	To	Name
	1857	René Gouet
2001	2026	Frédéric Hazouard

== Demography ==
The inhabitants of the commune are known as Avonnais or Avonnaises in French.

Historical population

Year	Pop.	±% p.a.
1793	333	—
1821	323	−0.11%
1846	311	−0.15%
1872	274	−0.49%
1901	240	−0.46%
1926	166	−1.46%
1946	171	+0.15%
1962	157	−0.53%
1968	135	−2.48%

Year	Pop.	±% p.a.
1975	108	−3.14%
1982	115	+0.90%
1990	114	−0.11%
1999	118	+0.38%
2007	166	+4.36%
2012	199	+3.69%
2017	193	−0.61%
2023	211	+1.50%

Source: EHESS and INSEE

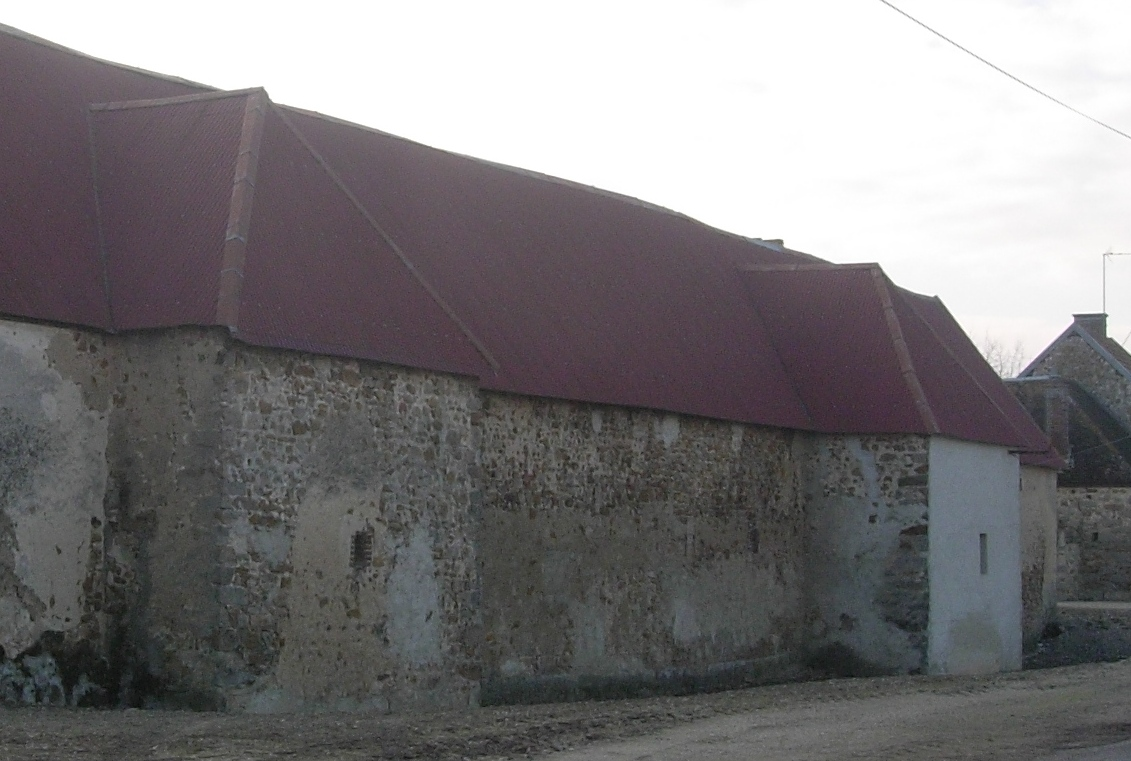
An old fortified farm

== Sites and Monuments ==
The Parish Church once belonged to the Abbey of Pothières in Côte-d'Or. Rebuilt in the 16th century, altered and distorted in the 18th century, it came under Saint-Pierre-ès-Liens. It contains a large number of items that are registered as historical objects:

- A Statue: Saint Pierre (17th century)
- A Statuette: Angel (17th century)
- A Statue: Virgin and child (16th century)
- A Group sculpture: Virgin of Pity (16th century)
- A Statue: Saint Fiacre (17th century)
- A Statue: Saint Éloi (16th century)
- A Statue: Saint Catherine (16th century)
- A Retable on the main Altar (1544)
- A Chalice (19th century)
- A Paten (1819-1838)
- A Chalice (1819-1838)
- A Baptismal font (14th century)
- A Chandelier (19th century)
- A Cabinet for Archives (17th century)
- A Processional Staff: Saint Nicolas (17th century)
- A Processional Staff: Saint Pierre (17th century)
- A Statue: Christ on the Cross (16th century)
- A Statue: Saint Marguerite (16th century)
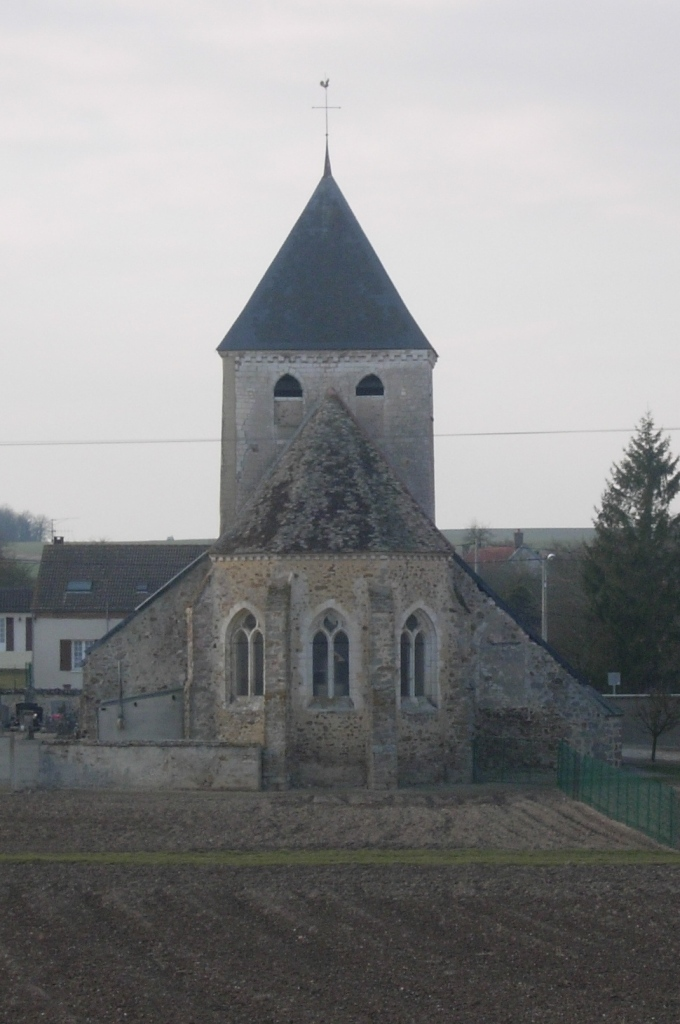
The Church.

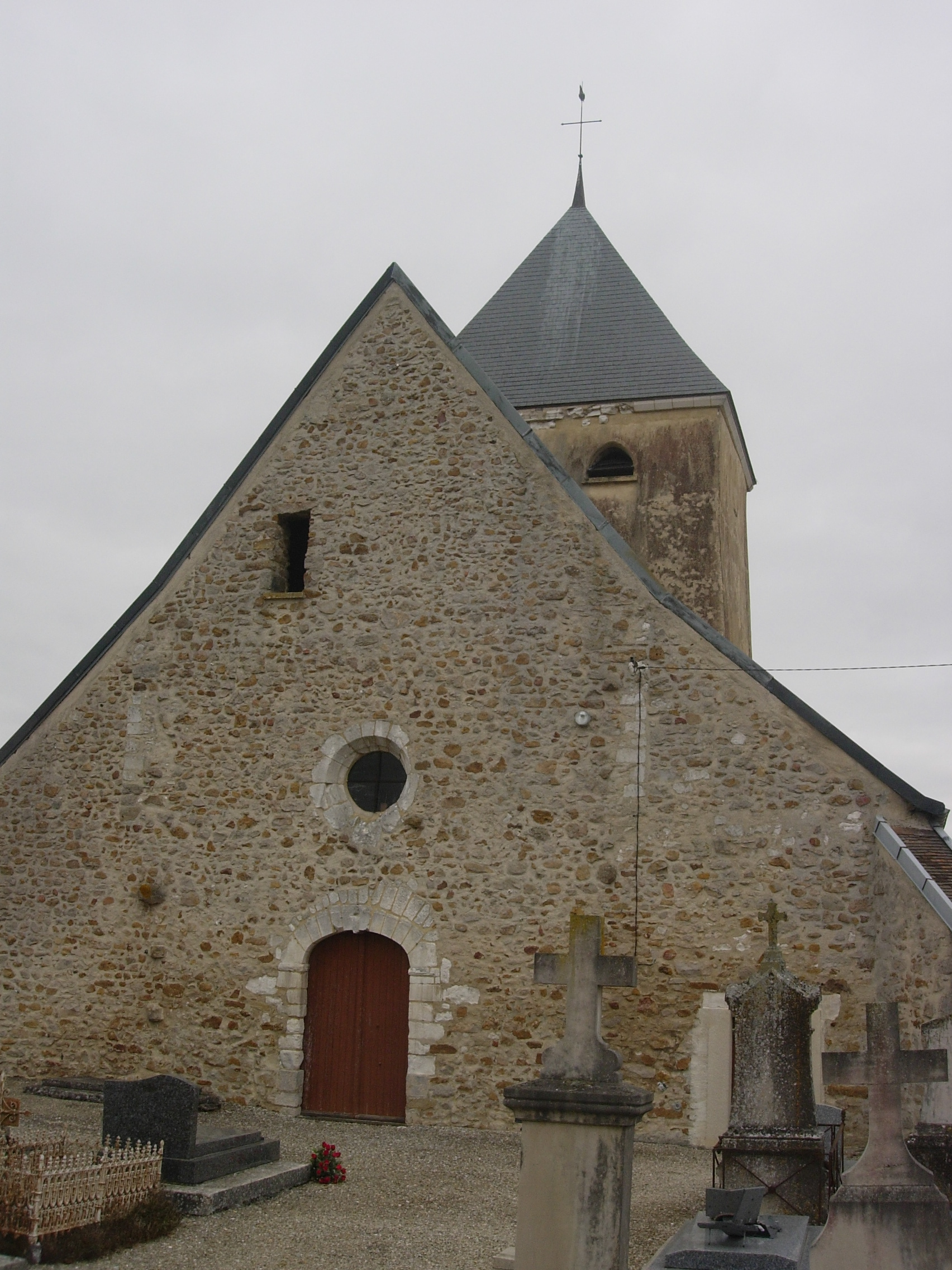
Facade of the Church.

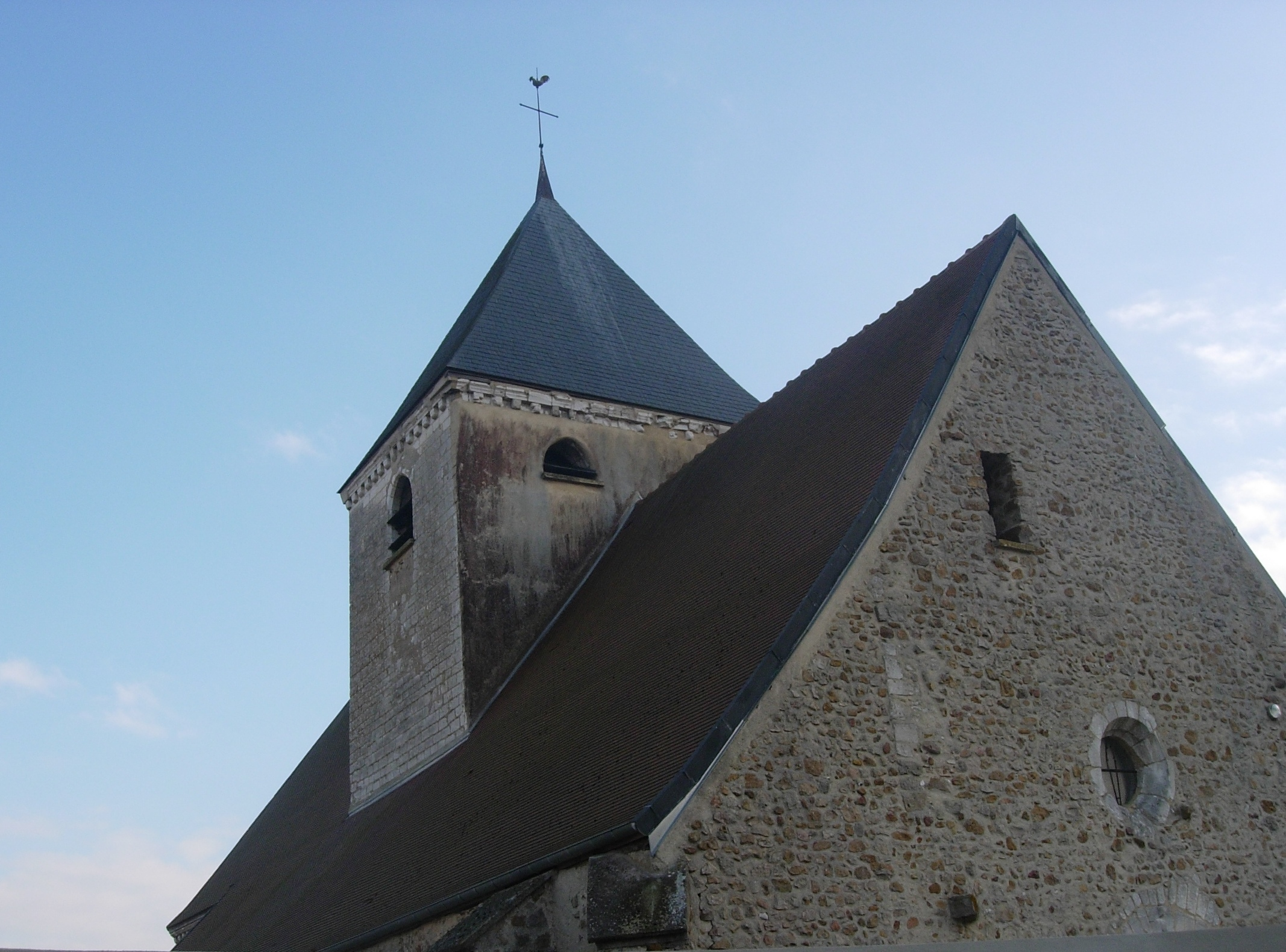
The Church Tower.

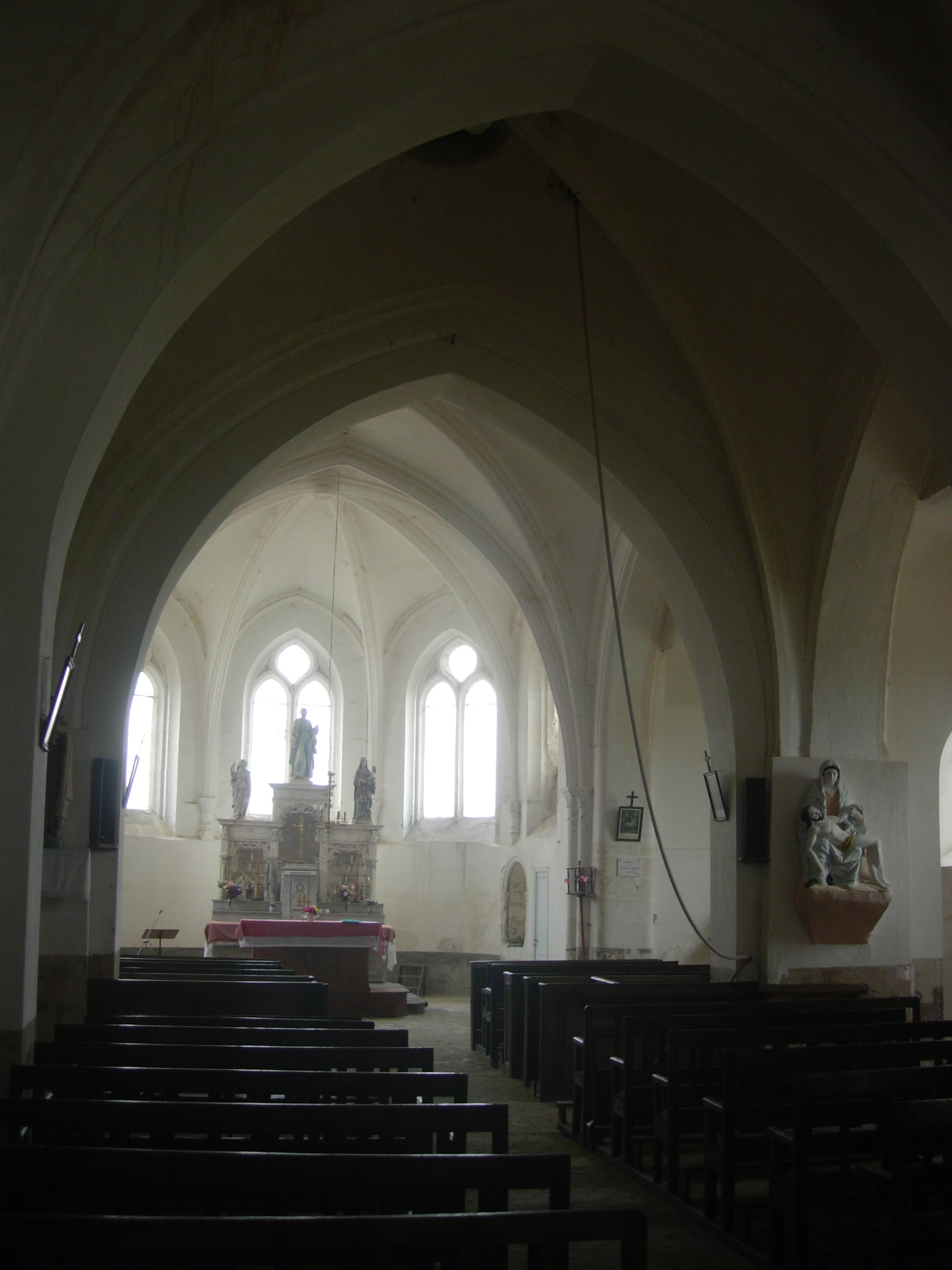
Interior of the Church.

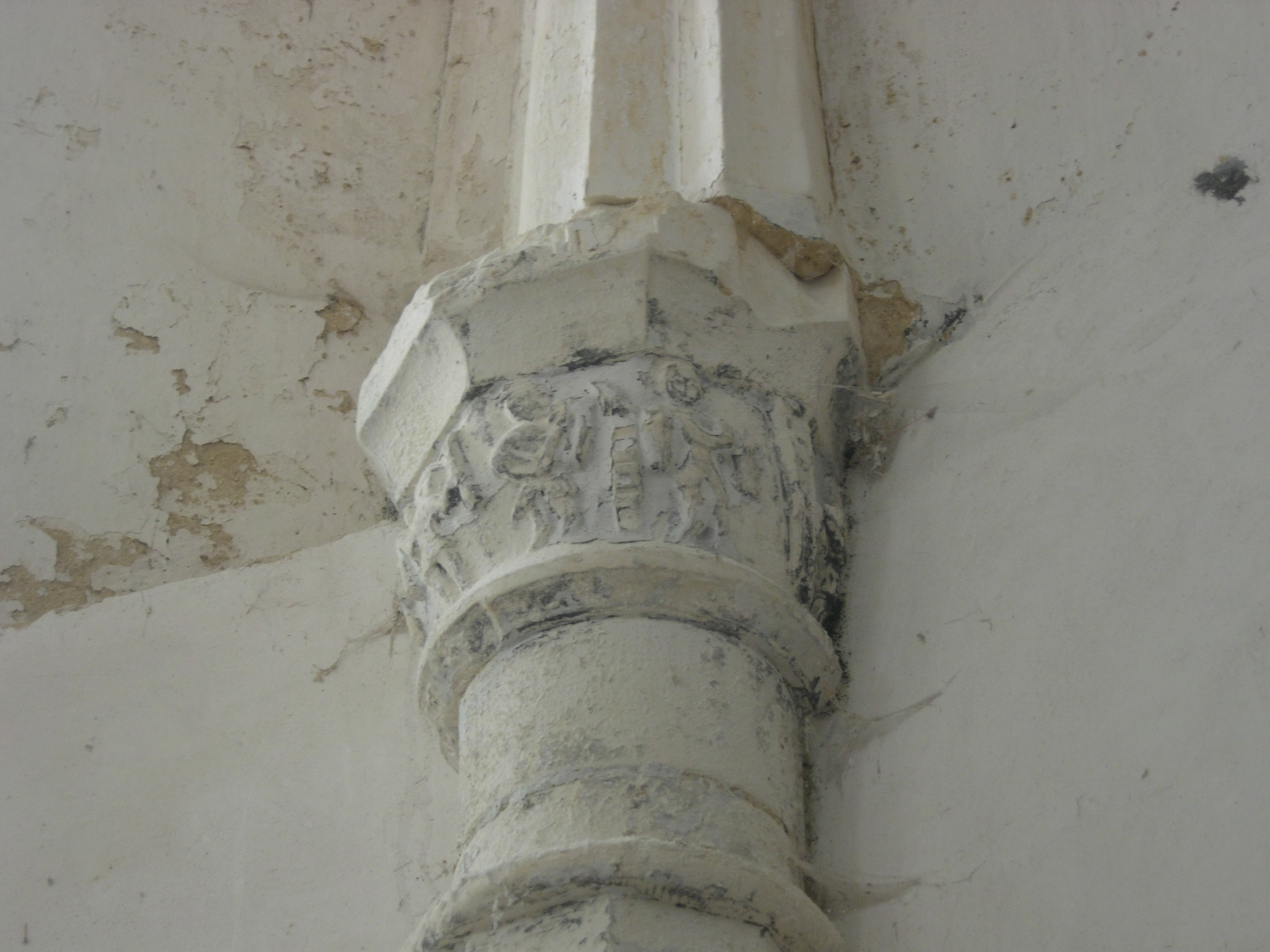
A Capital in the Church.

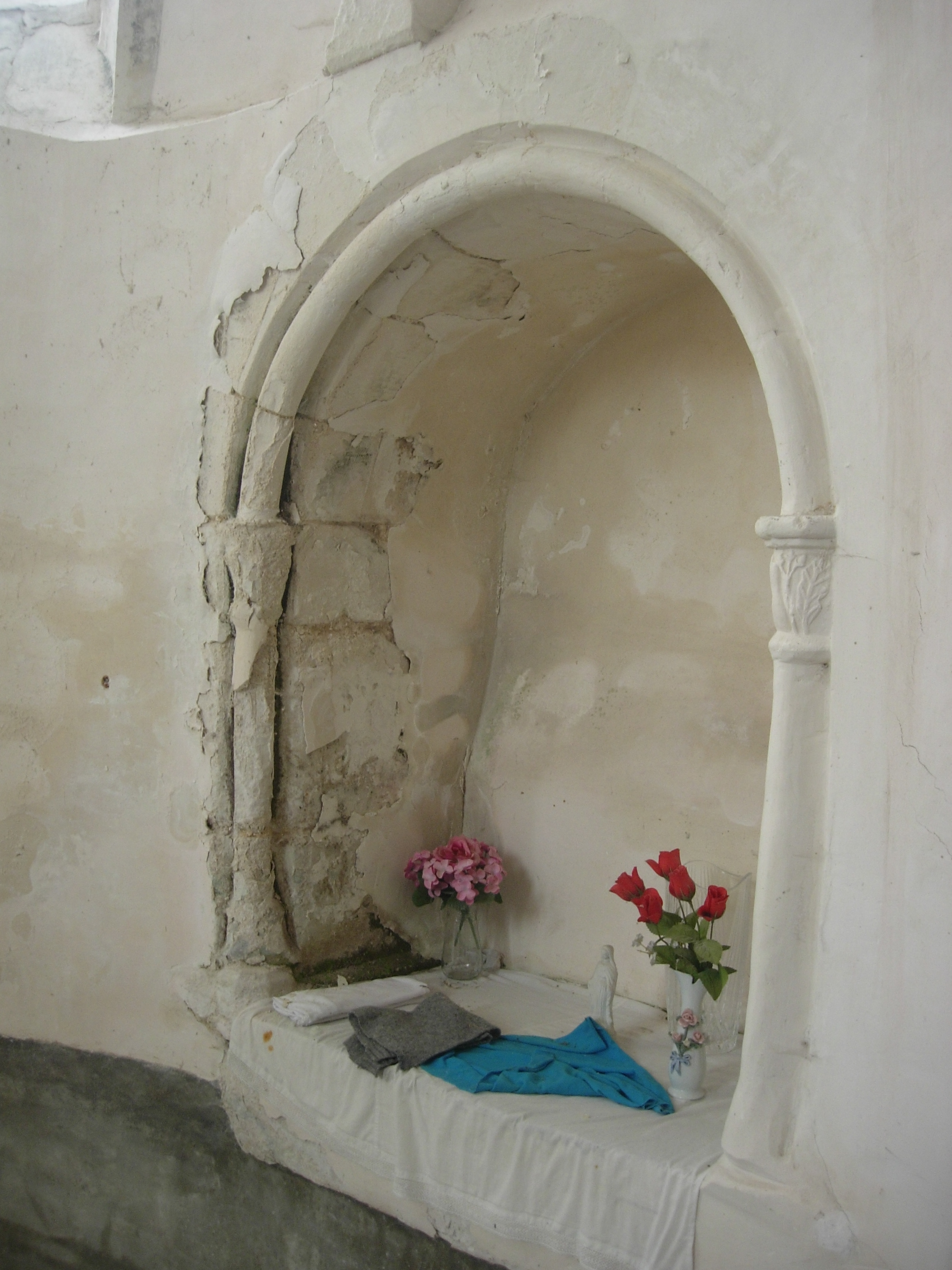
A recess in the Church.

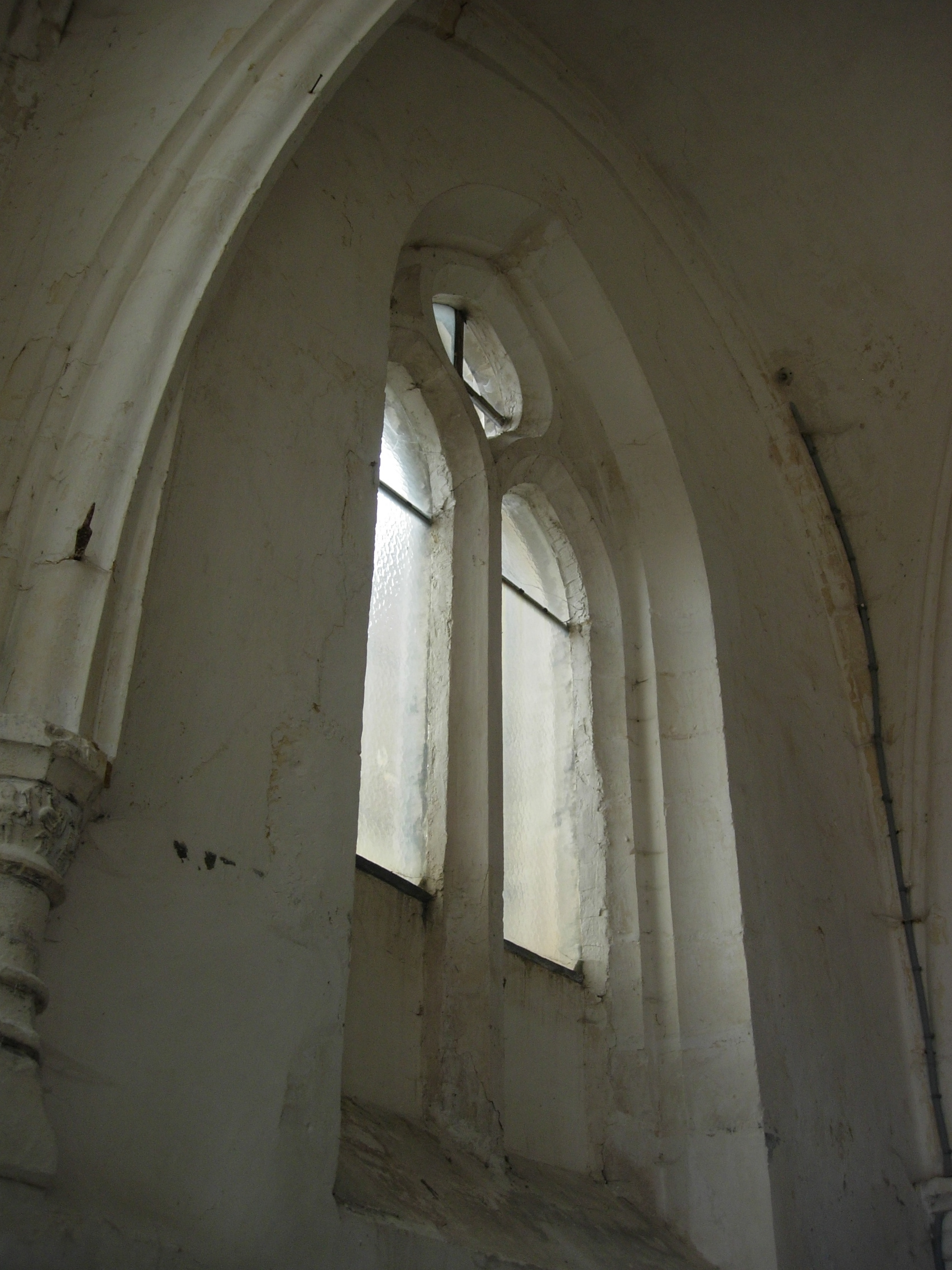
One of the windows in the Church.

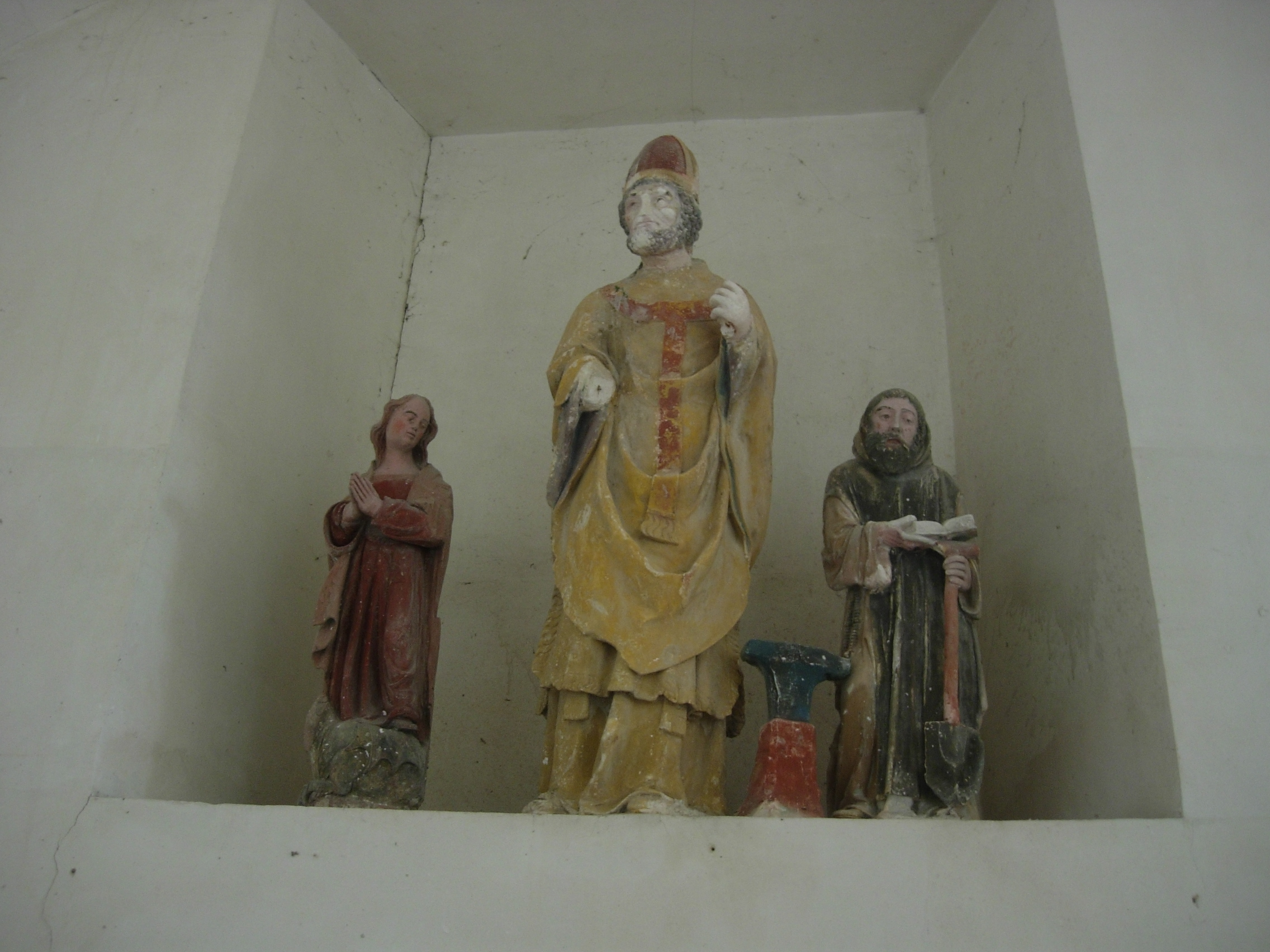
Statues of Saints.

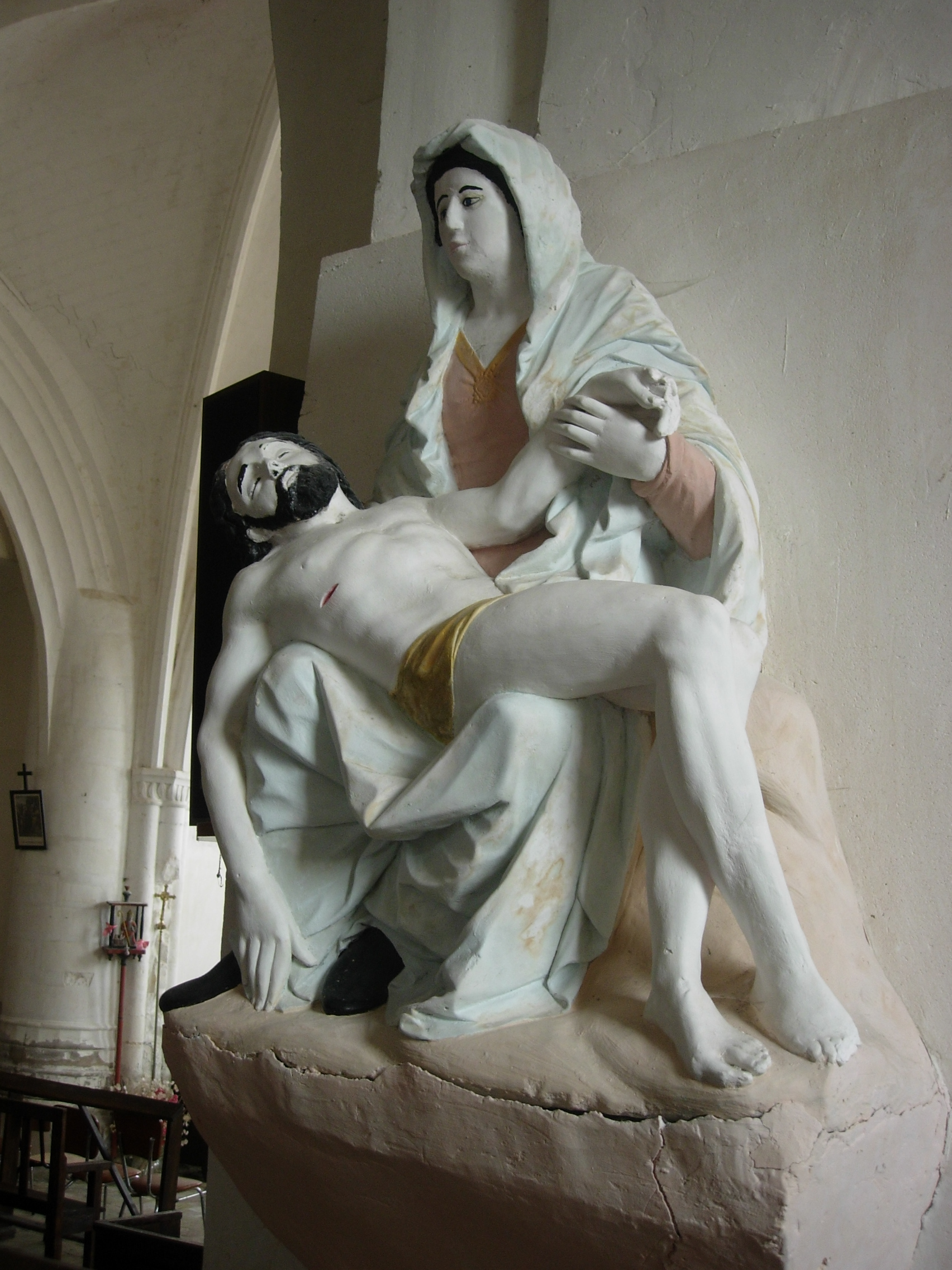
The Statue of the Virgin of Pity

== See also ==
- Communes of the Aube department
