= Château des évêques de Troyes =

Castle in Saint-Lyé, Aube, France

Coordinates: 48°21′41″N 4°00′25″E

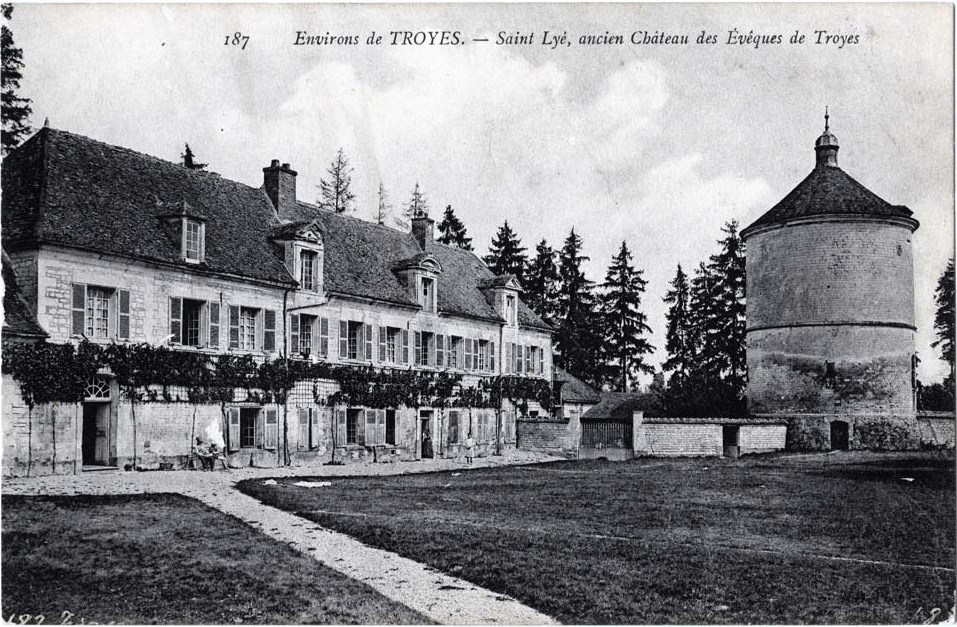
Postcard from early 20th century

The Château des évêques de Troyes (Château of the Bishops of Troyes) is a castle, converted into a château in the commune of Saint-Lyé in the Aube département of France.

== History ==
An earlier castle fell to the Normans in the 9th century.

This castle is recorded from 1180 and is known for the marriage of Louis X and Clementia of Hungary, his second wife, on 3 August 1315.

According to the historian Jean-Charles Courtalon-Delaistre, the kings of France had great affection for this place. In the 13th century, Louis VII gave it to Mathieu, Bishop of Troyes, with the manor of Saint-Lyé. Philippe-Auguste confirmed this donation in favour of Bishop Hervé. The Bastard of Bourbon stayed in the castle with 69 horses on 18 October 1349.

In 1372, Bishop Jean Braque, "sword in hand", supported a siege against the English. He assured King Charles V that his castle could shelter the inhabitants of the village and those for two leagues around. The king asked his bailiff to make sure that the said inhabitants fulfilled his right of custody of the castle in return.

In 1429, part of Charles VII's army occupied the castle pending the outcome of the proceedings by Brother Richard, chaplain to Joan of Arc, for the surrender of the town of Troyes. In 1582, Louise de Lorraine, wife of Henri III, went to stay there returning from Lorraine.

The castle was remodelled in the 16th century by Odard Hennequin, Bishop of Troyes and Senlis. Although the dovecote is 16th century, the present buildings are from the end of the 17th century or the beginning of the 18th.

It has been listed since 1933 as a monument historique by the French Ministry of Culture.

== See also ==
- List of castles in France
