= Étienne Doué =

Grower Champagne producer

Étienne Doué is a Grower Champagne producer located in the commune of Montgueux in the Aube region of Champagne. The soils contain clay, as well as hard limestone, limestone, and some chalk. The grapes are hand-harvested, and vinified in stainless steel; no oak is used. All Étienne Doué white wines undergo malolactic conversion. The wines are lightly filtered but not fined.
