= Château de Pouy-sur-Vannes =

Coordinates: 48.3027°N 3.5909°E

- Interactive map of the Château de Pouy-sur-Vannes area

General information
- Type: Château
- Location: Pouy-sur-Vannes, France

Château de Pouy-sur-Vannes is a listed historic château in Pouy-sur-Vannes, Aube, France.

== History ==
The château was built in the 16th century.

In 1973, Countess La Noé donated it to the Legion of Honor Association, which used it as a retreat and conference. By 2012, due to the cost of maintaining the chateau, they listed it for sale. It was acquired by Chilean-born American interior designer Juan Pablo Molyneux in 2013. By 2014, he had redesigned the interiors.

== Architectural significance ==
It has been listed as a monument historique by the French Ministry of Culture since 1969.
