= Macey, Aube =

Commune in Grand Est, France

Macey
- Commune
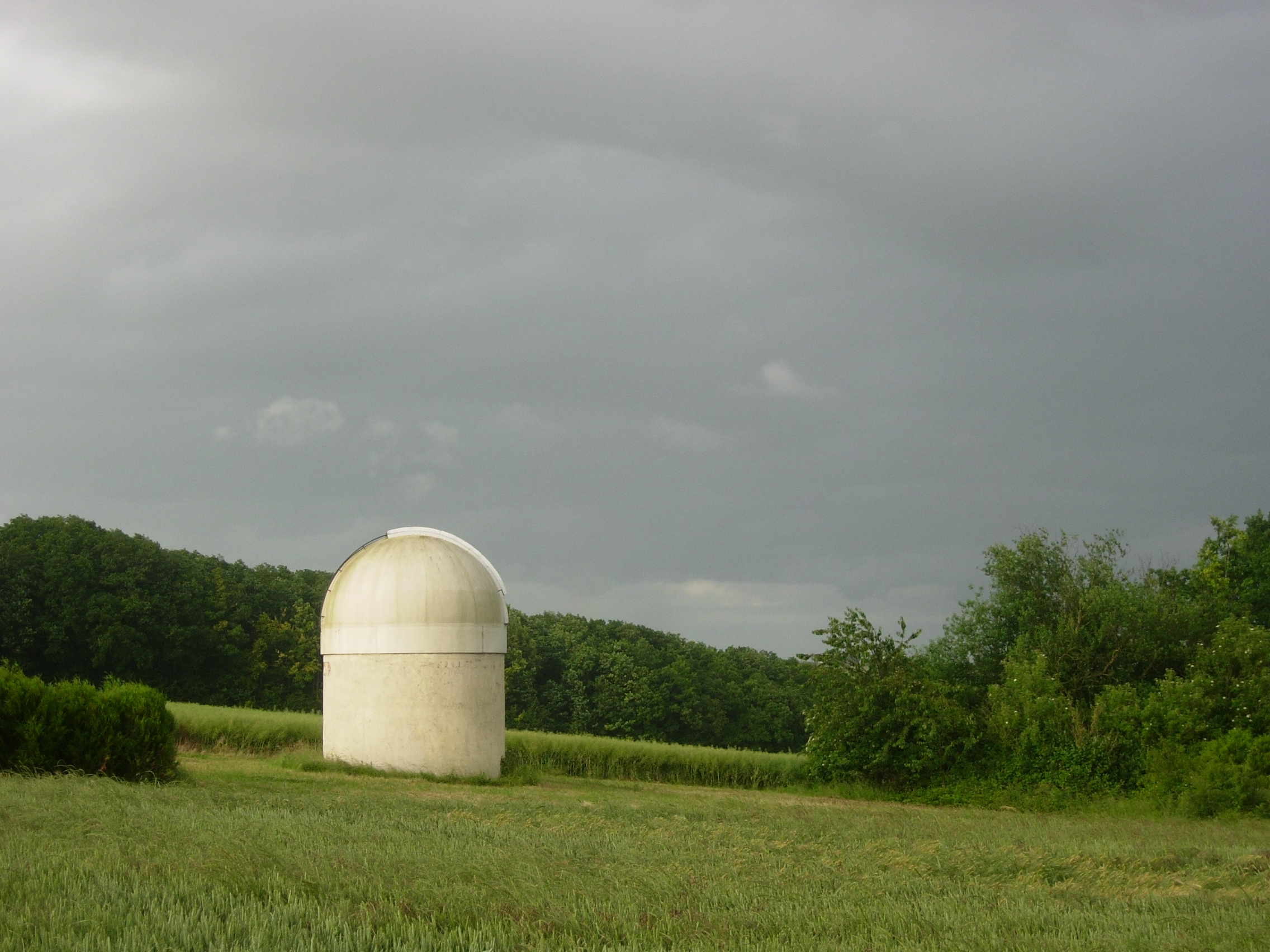
- Observatory
- Location of Macey
- Location within France Location within Grand Est
- Coordinates: 48°17′36″N 3°54′57″E
- Country: France
- Region: Grand Est
- Department: Aube
- Arrondissement: Troyes
- Canton: Saint-Lyé
- Intercommunality: Troyes Champagne Métropole

Government
  - Mayor (2020–2026): Dominique Fleuret
- Area^{1}: 20.46 km^{2} (7.90 sq mi)
- Elevation: 176 m (577 ft)
- Population (2023): 975
  - Density: 47.7/km^{2} (123/sq mi)
- Time zone: UTC+01:00 (CET)
  - Summer (DST): UTC+02:00 (CEST)
- INSEE/Postal code: 10211 /10300
- ^{1} French Land Register data, which excludes lakes, ponds, glaciers > 1 km^{2} (0.386 sq mi or 247 acres) and river estuaries.

Macey (French pronunciation: [masɛ]) is a commune in the Aube department in north-central France.

== Population ==
Historical population
Year	Pop.	±% p.a.
1968	204	—
1975	199	−0.35%
1982	534	+15.14%
1990	724	+3.88%
1999	742	+0.27%
2007	858	+1.83%
2012	918	+1.36%
2017	964	+0.98%
2023	975	+0.19%
Source: INSEE

== See also ==
- Communes of the Aube department
