= Juan Pablo Molyneux =

Chilean-born American interior designer

- Education: Catholic University of Chile
- Occupation: Interior designer
- Spouse: Pilar Molyneux

Juan Pablo Molyneux is a Chilean-born American interior designer. Based on the Upper East Side New York and Le Marais Paris-France, he has designed the interiors of private residences, and public buildings, and private member's clubs in the Americas, Europe and the Middle East. Molyneux is known for his classic & traditional style.

== Early life ==
Juan Pablo Molyneux was born in Chile. He grew up in Santiago, and vacationed in Europe. His father was a banker and a sports car collector. He grew up speaking Spanish, French and English, and playing rugby.

He graduated from the Catholic University of Chile, where he studied architecture. He later attended the Ecole des Beaux Arts and the École du Louvre in Paris. He was born Juan Pablo Morales and later changed his family name from Morales to Molyneux.

== Career ==
Molyneux started his career in Santiago, and later moved to Buenos Aires, Argentina. Later, he moved to New York City. Today, he lives and works permanently in Paris, France.

Molyneux has designed private residences in South America, North America, Europe, and the Middle East. In 2004, he designed the interior of the Cercle de l'Union interalliée, a private members' club in Paris. He designed the interior of the Pavilion of Treaties in Saint Petersburg, Russia. Molyneux designed the rooms for the Russian Federation in the Palais des Nations, the United Nations headquarters in Geneva, giving the two salons both presence and a sense of history. In Doha, he designed a 40,000-square-foot palace for Sheikh Mohamed Bin Suhaim Al-Thani of the House of Thani, the ruling family of Qatar.

Molyneux serves on the Boards of Trustees of the American Friends of Versailles, the World Monuments Fund, and the French Heritage Society. He was honored by the French Heritage Society at their gala dinner dance in November, 2015.

2 books have been published about his work:

Molyneux, Rizzoli 1997.

Molyneux at Home, Assouline 2016.

French Minister of Culture & Communication, Jean Donnedieu de Vabres, made him a Knight in the Order of Arts and Letters, in 2004.

== Personal life ==
Molyneux is a naturalized American citizen. He is married to Pilar Valdivieso, whom he met when they were both teenagers. After they moved to France, they reside in a hôtel particulier in Le Marais Paris. They also own the historic Château de Pouy-sur-Vannes in Champagne region, 150 kilometers South of Paris. Several rescue dogs adopted from the French ASPCA reside at the château, and they are seen lounging on the sofas in the salon in a video produced for the FHS Gala in 2015. An avid tennis player, Juan Pablo Molyneux has both grass and clay courts at the château, so that he can play year-round.
