= Villeloup =

Commune in Grand Est, France

- Commune
- Location of Villeloup
- Location within France Location within Grand Est
- Coordinates: 48°21′42″N 3°52′31″E
- Country: France
- Region: Grand Est
- Department: Aube
- Arrondissement: Troyes
- Canton: Saint-Lyé
- Intercommunality: CA Troyes Champagne Métropole

Government
  - Mayor (2020–2026): Eric Simon
- Area^{1}: 16.31 km^{2} (6.30 sq mi)
- Elevation: 165 m (541 ft)
- Population (2023): 130
  - Density: 8.0/km^{2} (21/sq mi)
- Time zone: UTC+01:00 (CET)
  - Summer (DST): UTC+02:00 (CEST)
- INSEE/Postal code: 10414 /10350
- ^{1} French Land Register data, which excludes lakes, ponds, glaciers > 1 km^{2} (0.386 sq mi or 247 acres) and river estuaries.

Villeloup (French pronunciation: [vil.lu]) is a commune in the Aube department in north-central France.

== Population ==
Historical population
Year	Pop.	±% p.a.
1968	97	—
1975	78	−3.07%
1982	106	+4.48%
1990	119	+1.46%
1999	110	−0.87%
2007	136	+2.69%
2012	116	−3.13%
2017	121	+0.85%
2023	130	+1.20%
Source: INSEE

== See also ==
- Communes of the Aube department
