= Dierrey-Saint-Julien =

Commune in Grand Est, France

- Commune
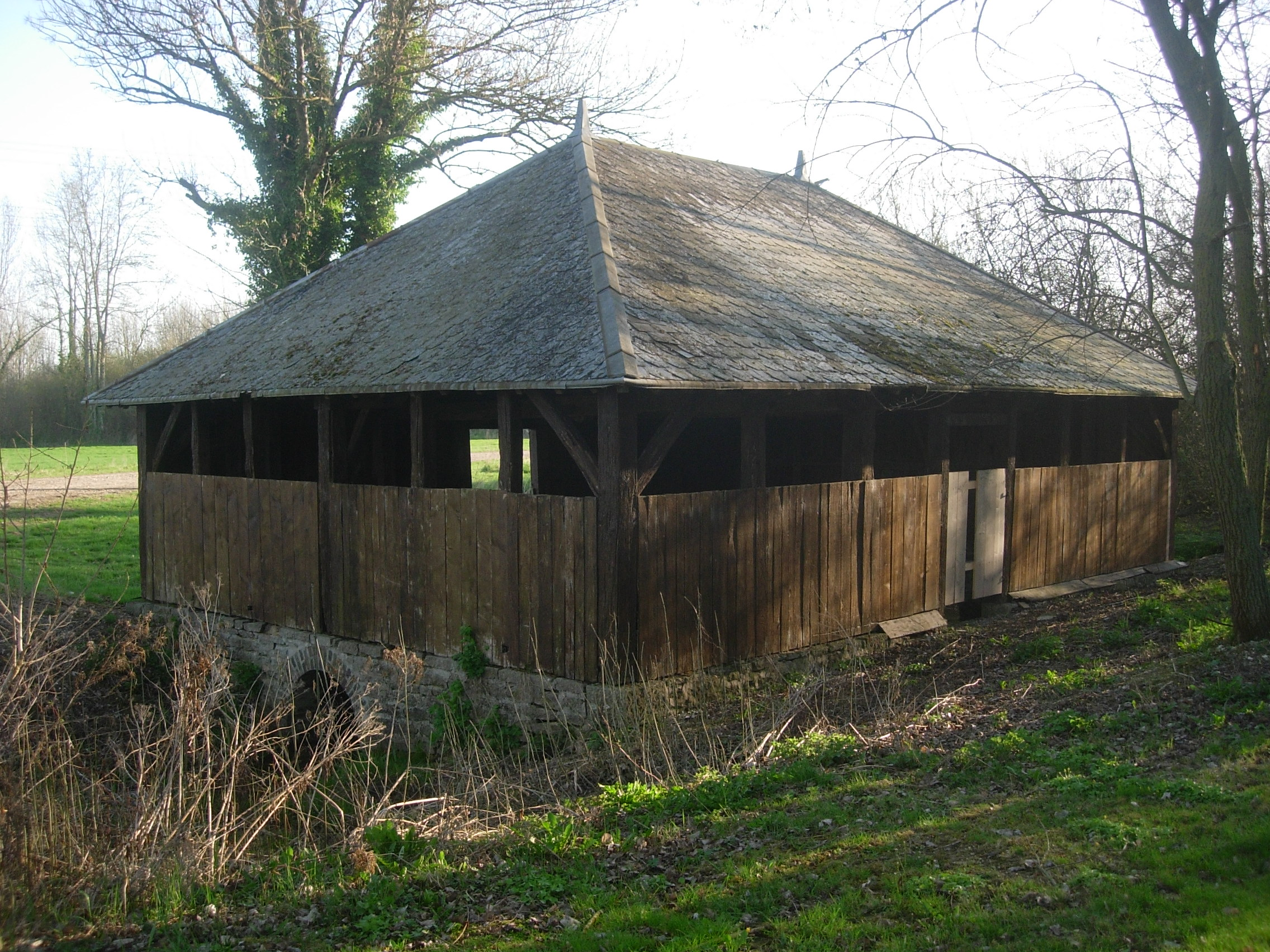
- Lavoir (wash house)

- Coat of arms
- Location of Dierrey-Saint-Julien
- Location within France Location within Grand Est
- Coordinates: 48°18′46″N 3°49′49″E
- Country: France
- Region: Grand Est
- Department: Aube
- Arrondissement: Nogent-sur-Seine
- Canton: Saint-Lyé

Government
  - Mayor (2020–2026): Bruno Richard
- Area^{1}: 21.25 km^{2} (8.20 sq mi)
- Elevation: 140 m (460 ft)
- Population (2023): 275
  - Density: 12.9/km^{2} (33.5/sq mi)
- Time zone: UTC+01:00 (CET)
  - Summer (DST): UTC+02:00 (CEST)
- INSEE/Postal code: 10124 /10190
- ^{1} French Land Register data, which excludes lakes, ponds, glaciers > 1 km^{2} (0.386 sq mi or 247 acres) and river estuaries.

Dierrey-Saint-Julien (French pronunciation: [djɛʁɛ sɛ̃ ʒyljɛ̃]) is a commune in the Aube department in north-central France.

== Population ==
Historical population
Year	Pop.	±% p.a.
1968	242	—
1975	215	−1.68%
1982	222	+0.46%
1990	216	−0.34%
1999	225	+0.45%
2007	246	+1.12%
2012	254	+0.64%
2017	261	+0.55%
2023	275	+0.87%
Source: INSEE

== See also ==
- Communes of the Aube department
