= Dierrey-Saint-Pierre =

Commune in Grand Est, France

- Commune
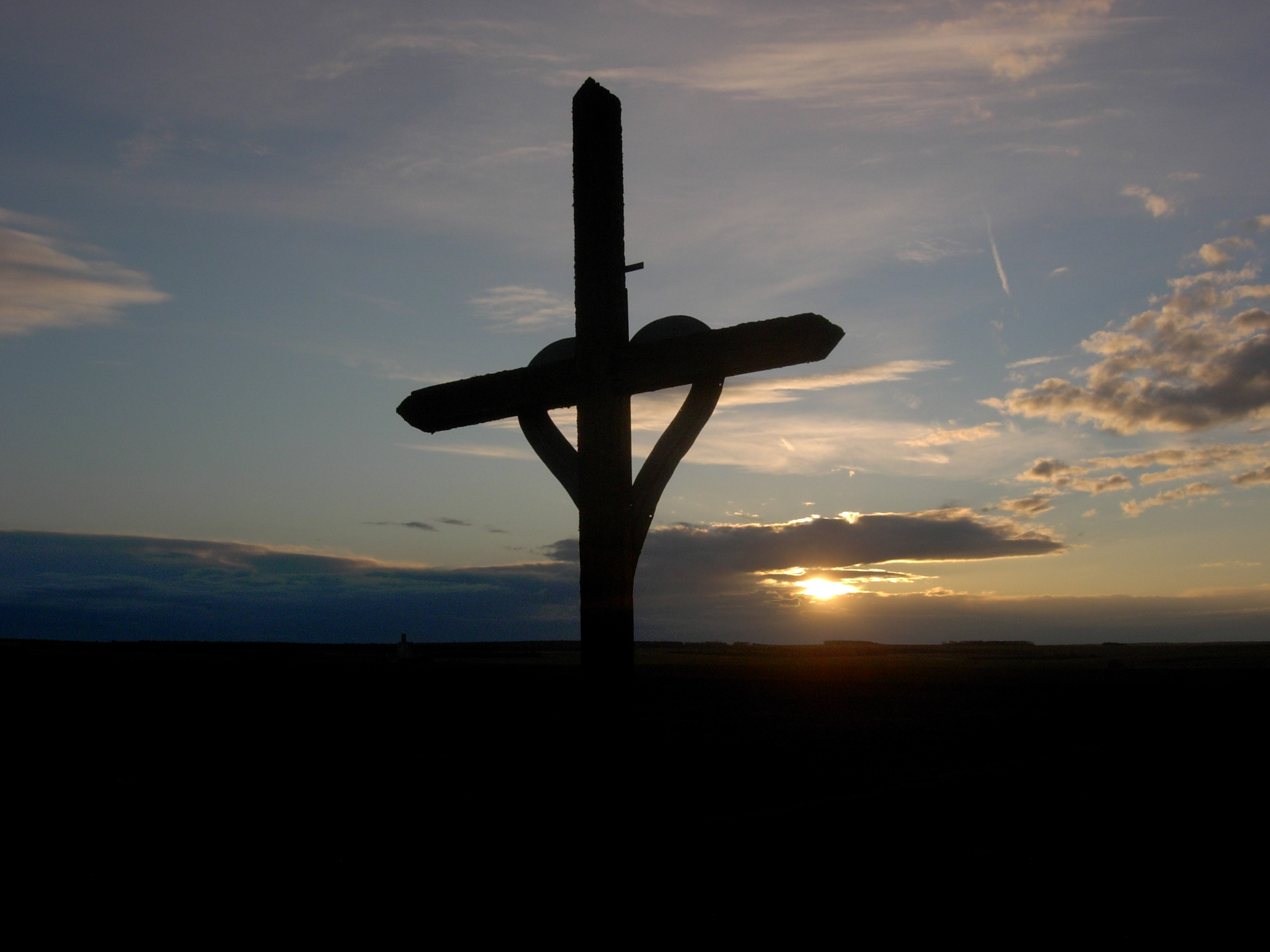
- Roadside cross

- Coat of arms
- Location of Dierrey-Saint-Pierre
- Location within France Location within Grand Est
- Coordinates: 48°19′43″N 3°49′39″E
- Country: France
- Region: Grand Est
- Department: Aube
- Arrondissement: Troyes
- Canton: Saint-Lyé
- Intercommunality: CA Troyes Champagne Métropole

Government
  - Mayor (2020–2026): Marcel Gatouillat
- Area^{1}: 21.61 km^{2} (8.34 sq mi)
- Elevation: 150 m (490 ft)
- Population (2023): 305
  - Density: 14.1/km^{2} (36.6/sq mi)
- Time zone: UTC+01:00 (CET)
  - Summer (DST): UTC+02:00 (CEST)
- INSEE/Postal code: 10125 /10190
- ^{1} French Land Register data, which excludes lakes, ponds, glaciers > 1 km^{2} (0.386 sq mi or 247 acres) and river estuaries.

Dierrey-Saint-Pierre (French pronunciation: [djɛʁɛ sɛ̃ pjɛʁ]) is a commune in the Aube department in north-central France.

== Population ==
Historical population
Year	Pop.	±% p.a.
1968	219	—
1975	192	−1.86%
1982	187	−0.38%
1990	165	−1.55%
1999	183	+1.16%
2007	187	+0.27%
2012	255	+6.40%
2017	298	+3.17%
2023	305	+0.39%
Source: INSEE

== See also ==
- Communes of the Aube department
