= Canton of Saint-Lyé =

Coordinates: 48.36°N 4.00°E

- Canton
- Situation of the canton of Saint-Lyé in the department of Aube
- Country: France
- Region: Grand Est
- Department: Aube
- No. of communes: {{{nbcomm}}}
- Population (2023): 16,403
- INSEE code: 1011

The canton of Saint-Lyé is an administrative division of the Aube department, northeastern France. It was created at the French canton reorganisation which came into effect in March 2015. Its seat is in Saint-Lyé.

It consists of the following communes:

1. Avant-lès-Marcilly
2. Avon-la-Pèze
3. Barberey-Saint-Sulpice
4. Bercenay-le-Hayer
5. Bourdenay
6. Charmoy
7. Dierrey-Saint-Julien
8. Dierrey-Saint-Pierre
9. Échemines
10. Faux-Villecerf
11. Fay-lès-Marcilly
12. La Fosse-Corduan
13. Macey
14. Marcilly-le-Hayer
15. Marigny-le-Châtel
16. Mesnil-Saint-Loup
17. Montgueux
18. Origny-le-Sec
19. Orvilliers-Saint-Julien
20. Ossey-les-Trois-Maisons
21. Le Pavillon-Sainte-Julie
22. Payns
23. Pouy-sur-Vannes
24. Prunay-Belleville
25. Rigny-la-Nonneuse
26. Saint-Flavy
27. Saint-Loup-de-Buffigny
28. Saint-Lupien
29. Saint-Lyé
30. Saint-Martin-de-Bossenay
31. Trancault
32. Villadin
33. Villeloup
