= Bourdenay =

Commune in Grand Est, France

- Commune
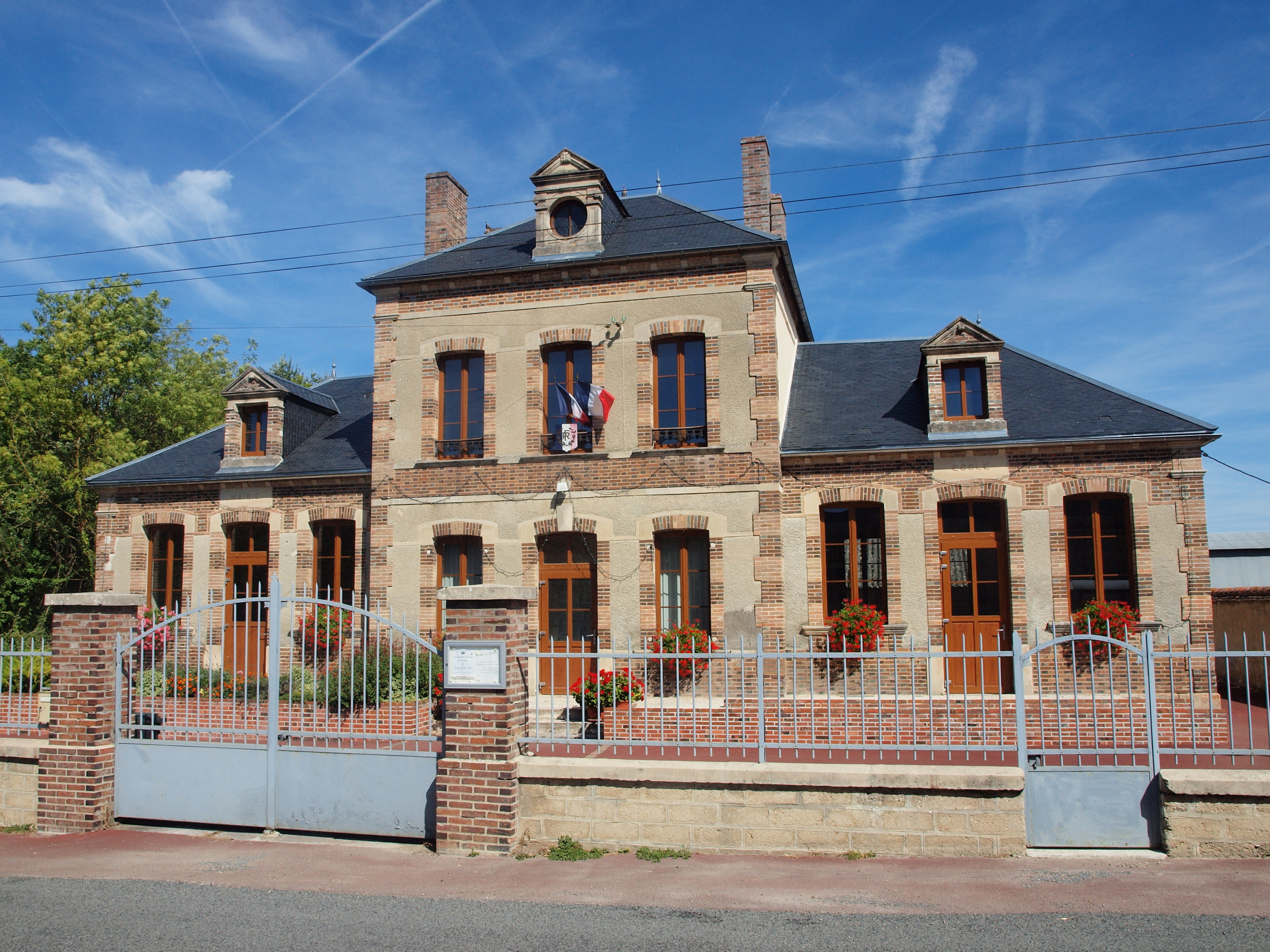
- The town hall in Bourdenay
- Location of Bourdenay
- Location within France Location within Grand Est
- Coordinates: 48°21′35″N 3°35′19″E
- Country: France
- Region: Grand Est
- Department: Aube
- Arrondissement: Nogent-sur-Seine
- Canton: Saint-Lyé
- Intercommunality: Orvin et Ardusson

Government
  - Mayor (2020–2026): Jean-Baptiste Camut
- Area^{1}: 18.69 km^{2} (7.22 sq mi)
- Population (2023): 130
  - Density: 7.0/km^{2} (18/sq mi)
- Time zone: UTC+01:00 (CET)
  - Summer (DST): UTC+02:00 (CEST)
- INSEE/Postal code: 10054 /10290
- ^{1} French Land Register data, which excludes lakes, ponds, glaciers > 1 km^{2} (0.386 sq mi or 247 acres) and river estuaries.

Bourdenay (French pronunciation: [buʁdənɛ]) is a commune in the Aube department in north-central France.

== Population ==
Historical population
Year	Pop.	±% p.a.
1968	123	—
1975	113	−1.20%
1982	108	−0.64%
1990	116	+0.90%
1999	123	+0.65%
2007	104	−2.08%
2012	128	+4.24%
2017	117	−1.78%
2023	130	+1.77%
Source: INSEE

== See also ==
- Communes of the Aube department
