= Le Pavillon-Sainte-Julie =

Commune in Grand Est, France

- Commune
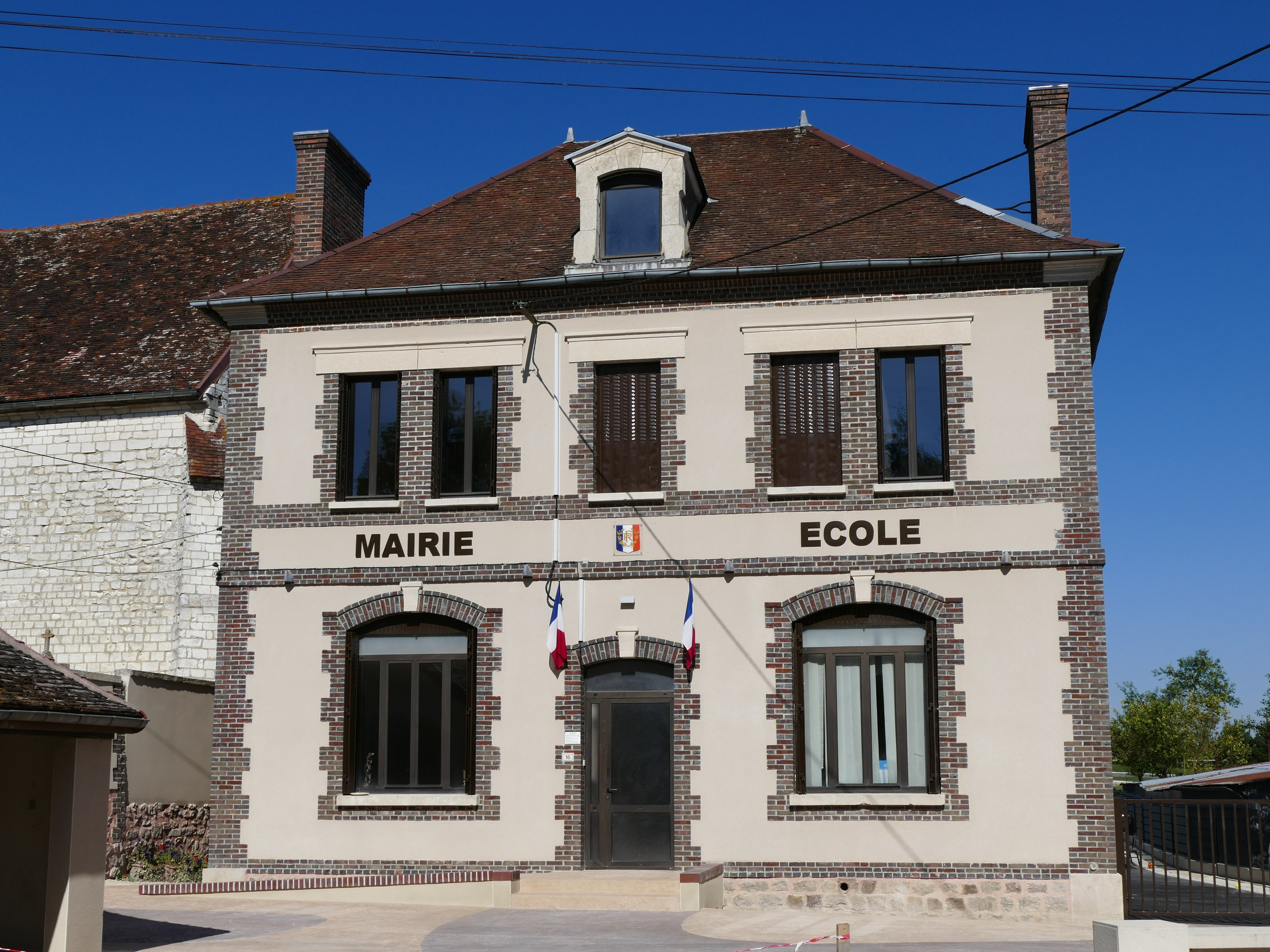
- The town hall in Le Pavillon-Sainte-Julie
- Location of Le Pavillon-Sainte-Julie
- Location within France Location within Grand Est
- Coordinates: 48°22′15″N 3°54′01″E
- Country: France
- Region: Grand Est
- Department: Aube
- Arrondissement: Troyes
- Canton: Saint-Lyé
- Intercommunality: CA Troyes Champagne Métropole

Government
  - Mayor (2020–2026): Marie-Ange Chalvet
- Area^{1}: 22.93 km^{2} (8.85 sq mi)
- Elevation: 133 m (436 ft)
- Population (2023): 280
  - Density: 12/km^{2} (32/sq mi)
- Time zone: UTC+01:00 (CET)
  - Summer (DST): UTC+02:00 (CEST)
- INSEE/Postal code: 10281 /10350
- ^{1} French Land Register data, which excludes lakes, ponds, glaciers > 1 km^{2} (0.386 sq mi or 247 acres) and river estuaries.

Le Pavillon-Sainte-Julie (French pronunciation: [lə pavijɔ̃ sɛ̃t ʒyli]) is a commune in the Aube department in north-central France.

== Population ==
Historical population
Year	Pop.	±% p.a.
1968	148	—
1975	136	−1.20%
1982	181	+4.17%
1990	221	+2.53%
1999	219	−0.10%
2007	318	+4.77%
2012	314	−0.25%
2017	291	−1.51%
2023	280	−0.64%
Source: INSEE

== See also ==
- Communes of the Aube department
