= Charmoy, Aube =

Commune in Grand Est, France

Charmoy
- Commune
- Location of Charmoy
- Location within France Location within Grand Est
- Coordinates: 48°24′14″N 3°35′14″E
- Country: France
- Region: Grand Est
- Department: Aube
- Arrondissement: Nogent-sur-Seine
- Canton: Saint-Lyé
- Intercommunality: Orvin et Ardusson

Government
  - Mayor (2020–2026): Eddy Bollaert
- Area^{1}: 6.89 km^{2} (2.66 sq mi)
- Elevation: 140 m (460 ft)
- Population (2023): 60
  - Density: 8.7/km^{2} (23/sq mi)
- Time zone: UTC+01:00 (CET)
  - Summer (DST): UTC+02:00 (CEST)
- INSEE/Postal code: 10085 /10290
- ^{1} French Land Register data, which excludes lakes, ponds, glaciers > 1 km^{2} (0.386 sq mi or 247 acres) and river estuaries.

Charmoy (French pronunciation: [ʃaʁmwa]) is a commune in the Aube department in north-central France.

== Population ==
Historical population
Year	Pop.	±% p.a.
1968	51	—
1975	73	+5.26%
1982	62	−2.31%
1990	57	−1.05%
1999	63	+1.12%
2007	59	−0.82%
2012	74	+4.63%
2017	70	−1.11%
2023	60	−2.54%
Source: INSEE

== See also ==
- Communes of the Aube department
