= Faux-Villecerf =

Commune in Grand Est, France

- Commune
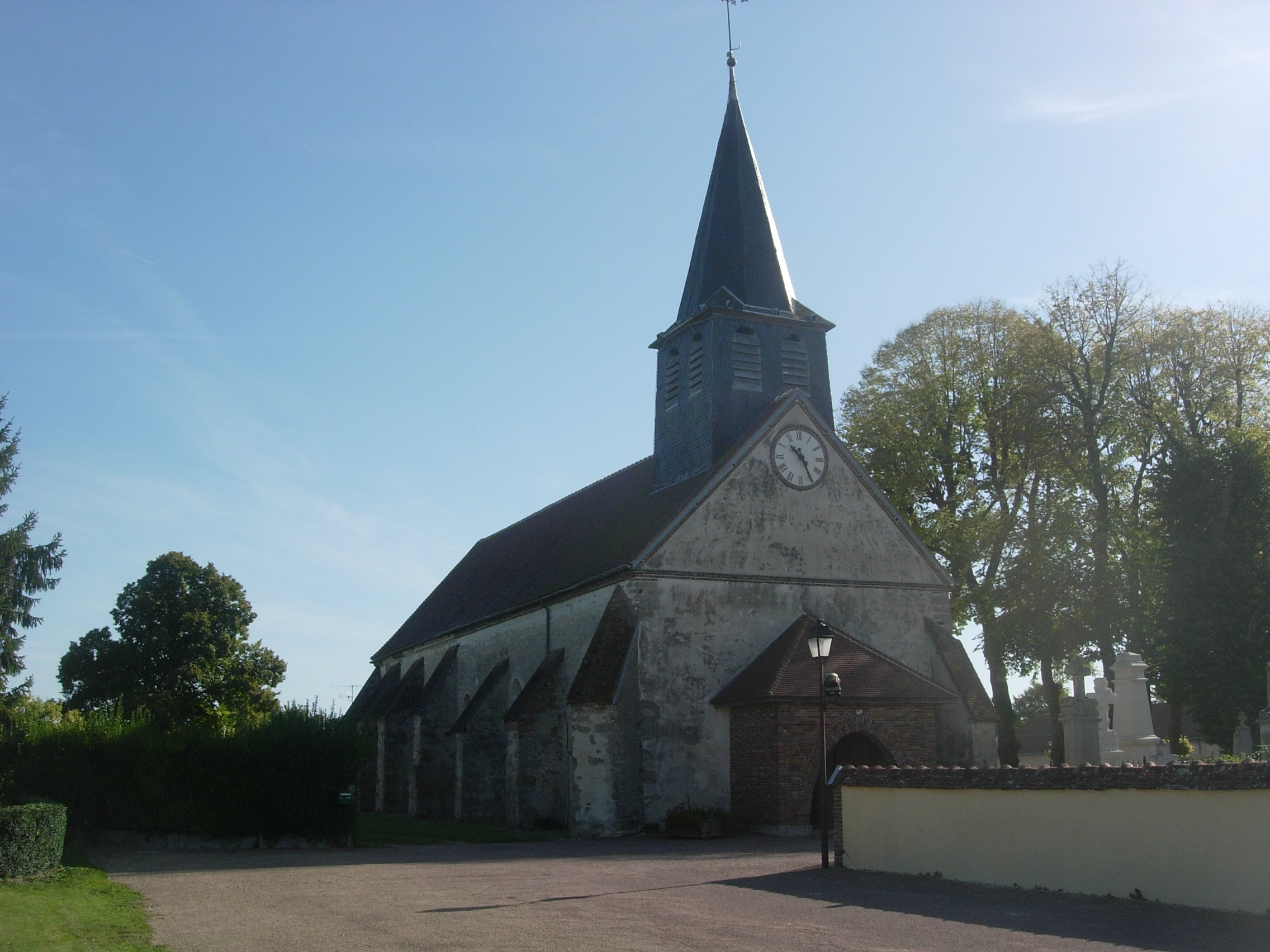
- The church in Faux-Villecerf

- Coat of arms
- Location of Faux-Villecerf
- Location within France Location within Grand Est
- Coordinates: 48°20′07″N 3°44′14″E
- Country: France
- Region: Grand Est
- Department: Aube
- Arrondissement: Nogent-sur-Seine
- Canton: Saint-Lyé
- Intercommunality: Orvin et Ardusson

Government
  - Mayor (2020–2026): Marie-Rose Baillot
- Area^{1}: 21.3 km^{2} (8.2 sq mi)
- Elevation: 160 m (520 ft)
- Population (2023): 215
  - Density: 10.1/km^{2} (26.1/sq mi)
- Time zone: UTC+01:00 (CET)
  - Summer (DST): UTC+02:00 (CEST)
- INSEE/Postal code: 10145 /10290
- ^{1} French Land Register data, which excludes lakes, ponds, glaciers > 1 km^{2} (0.386 sq mi or 247 acres) and river estuaries.

Faux-Villecerf (French pronunciation: [fo vilsɛʁf]) is a commune in the Aube department in north-central France.

== Population ==
Historical population
Year	Pop.	±% p.a.
1968	228	—
1975	223	−0.32%
1982	225	+0.13%
1990	240	+0.81%
1999	224	−0.76%
2007	227	+0.17%
2012	214	−1.17%
2017	221	+0.65%
2023	215	−0.46%
Source: INSEE

== See also ==
- Communes of the Aube department
