= Bercenay-le-Hayer =

Commune in Grand Est, France

- Commune
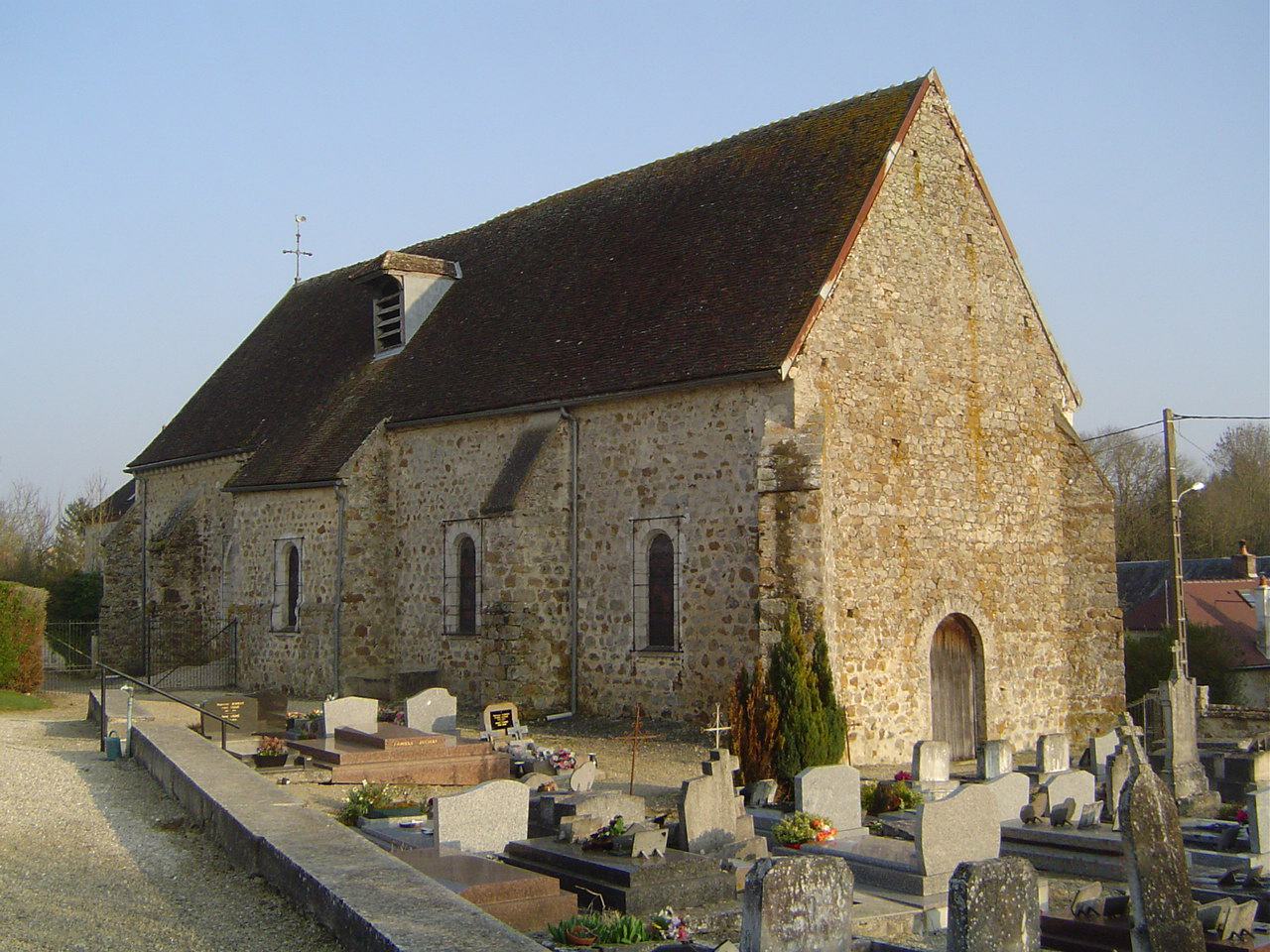
- The church in Bercenay-le-Hayer
- Location of Bercenay-le-Hayer
- Location within France Location within Grand Est
- Coordinates: 48°20′38″N 3°35′44″E
- Country: France
- Region: Grand Est
- Department: Aube
- Arrondissement: Nogent-sur-Seine
- Canton: Saint-Lyé
- Intercommunality: Orvin et Ardusson

Government
  - Mayor (2020–2026): Jacques Lavillette
- Area^{1}: 14.63 km^{2} (5.65 sq mi)
- Population (2023): 187
  - Density: 12.8/km^{2} (33.1/sq mi)
- Time zone: UTC+01:00 (CET)
  - Summer (DST): UTC+02:00 (CEST)
- INSEE/Postal code: 10038 /10290
- ^{1} French Land Register data, which excludes lakes, ponds, glaciers > 1 km^{2} (0.386 sq mi or 247 acres) and river estuaries.

Bercenay-le-Hayer is a commune in the Aube department in north-central France.

== Population ==
Historical population
Year	Pop.	±% p.a.
1968	146	—
1975	137	−0.90%
1982	147	+1.01%
1990	151	+0.34%
1999	135	−1.24%
2007	142	+0.63%
2012	165	+3.05%
2017	191	+2.97%
2023	187	−0.35%
Source: INSEE

== See also ==
- Communes of the Aube department
