= Saint-Flavy =

Commune in Grand Est, France

- Commune
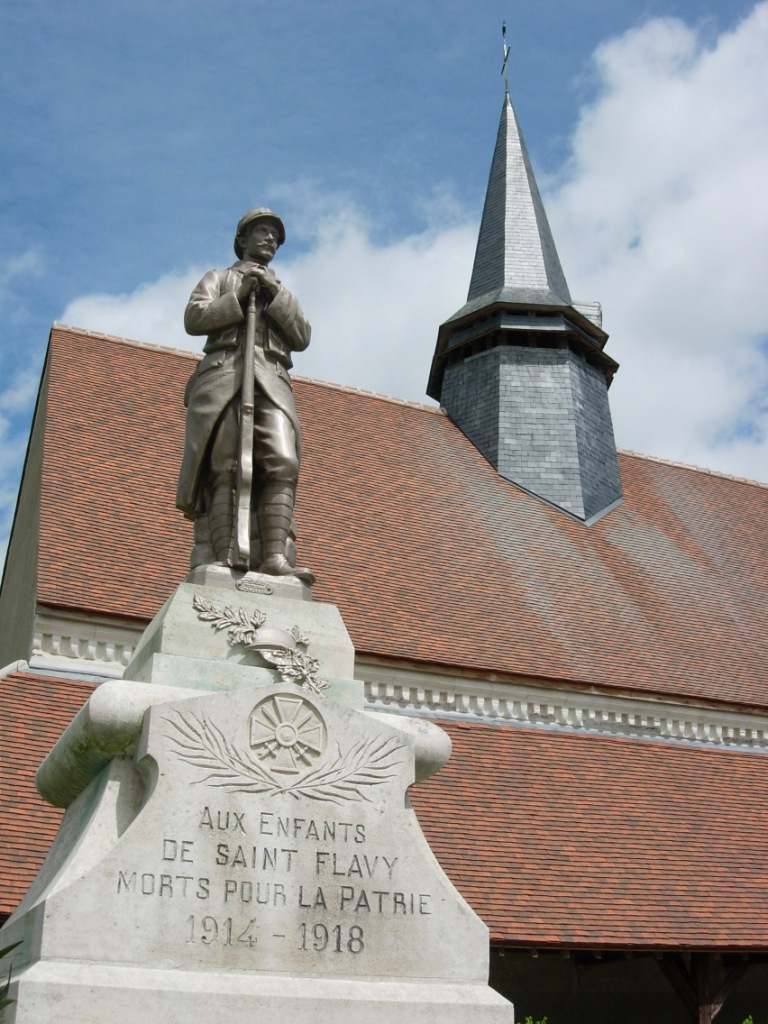
- War memorial
- Location of Saint-Flavy
- Location within France Location within Grand Est
- Coordinates: 48°24′16″N 3°45′42″E
- Country: France
- Region: Grand Est
- Department: Aube
- Arrondissement: Nogent-sur-Seine
- Canton: Saint-Lyé
- Intercommunality: Orvin et Ardusson

Government
  - Mayor (2020–2026): Eric Pilliet
- Area^{1}: 17.24 km^{2} (6.66 sq mi)
- Elevation: 114 m (374 ft)
- Population (2023): 298
  - Density: 17.3/km^{2} (44.8/sq mi)
- Time zone: UTC+01:00 (CET)
  - Summer (DST): UTC+02:00 (CEST)
- INSEE/Postal code: 10339 /10350
- ^{1} French Land Register data, which excludes lakes, ponds, glaciers > 1 km^{2} (0.386 sq mi or 247 acres) and river estuaries.

Saint-Flavy (French pronunciation: [sɛ̃ flavi]) is a commune in the Aube department in north-central France.

== Population ==
Historical population
Year	Pop.	±% p.a.
1968	180	—
1975	192	+0.93%
1982	216	+1.70%
1990	247	+1.69%
1999	211	−1.74%
2007	255	+2.40%
2012	267	+0.92%
2017	283	+1.17%
2023	298	+0.86%
Source: INSEE

== See also ==
- Communes of the Aube department
