= Montgueux =

Commune in Grand Est, France

- Commune
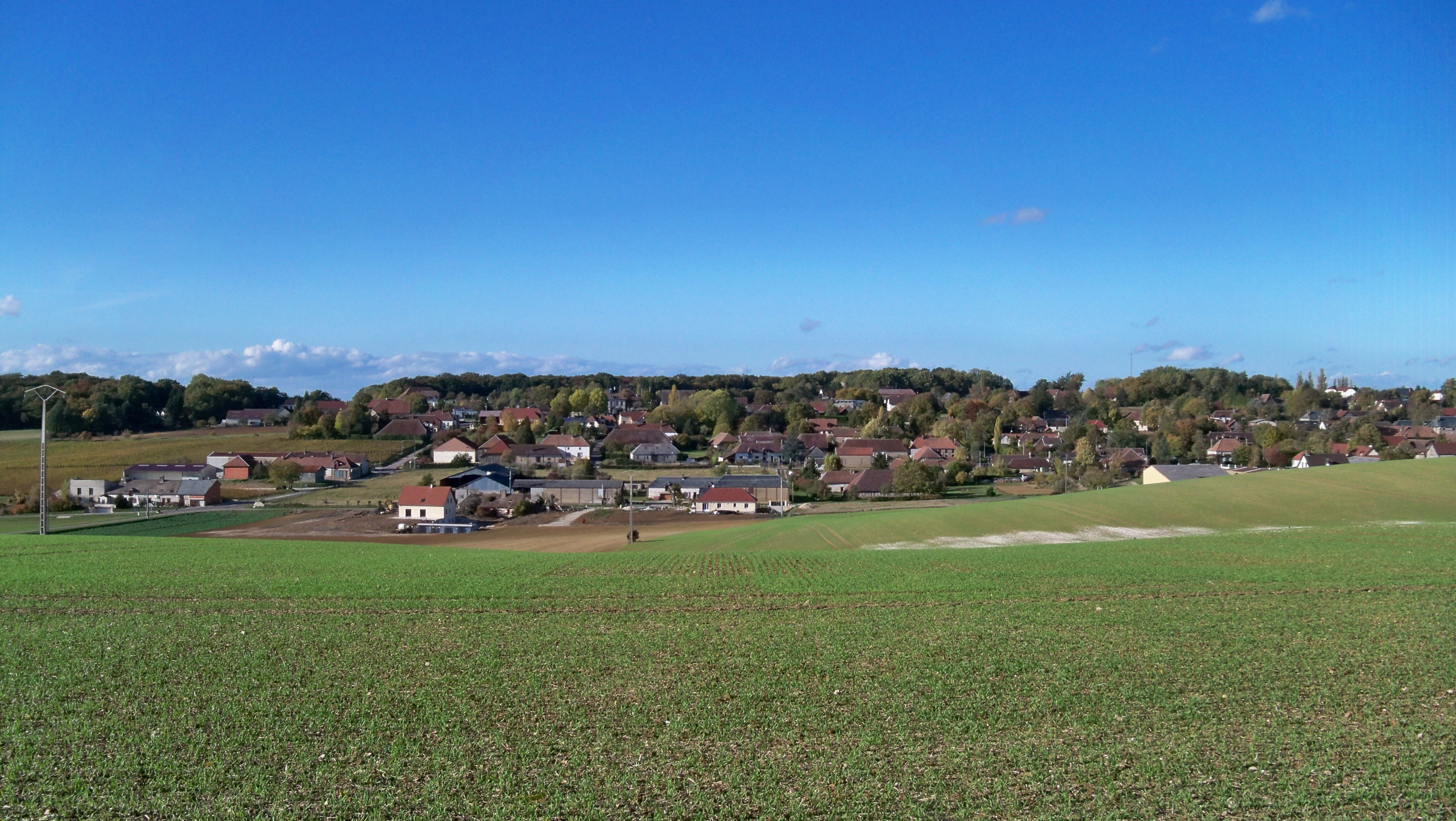
- A general view of Montgueux
- Location of Montgueux
- Location within France Location within Grand Est
- Coordinates: 48°18′22″N 3°57′37″E
- Country: France
- Region: Grand Est
- Department: Aube
- Arrondissement: Troyes
- Canton: Saint-Lyé
- Intercommunality: CA Troyes Champagne Métropole

Government
  - Mayor (2020–2026): Marie-Thérèse Leroy
- Area^{1}: 11.25 km^{2} (4.34 sq mi)
- Elevation: 269 m (883 ft)
- Population (2023): 386
  - Density: 34.3/km^{2} (88.9/sq mi)
- Time zone: UTC+01:00 (CET)
  - Summer (DST): UTC+02:00 (CEST)
- INSEE/Postal code: 10248 /10300
- ^{1} French Land Register data, which excludes lakes, ponds, glaciers > 1 km^{2} (0.386 sq mi or 247 acres) and river estuaries.

Montgueux (French pronunciation: [mɔ̃ɡø]) is a commune in the Aube department in north-central France.

== History ==
According to M. Girard, the modern Maurattes plains around the town were once known as the Campus Mauriacus, and it is considered the most likely location for the Battle of the Catalaunian Plains.

== Population ==
Historical population
Year	Pop.	±% p.a.
1968	231	—
1975	274	+2.47%
1982	346	+3.39%
1990	360	+0.50%
1999	372	+0.36%
2007	407	+1.13%
2012	404	−0.15%
2017	399	−0.25%
2023	386	−0.55%
Source: INSEE

== See also ==
- Communes of the Aube department
