= Ossey-les-Trois-Maisons =

Commune in Grand Est, France

- Commune
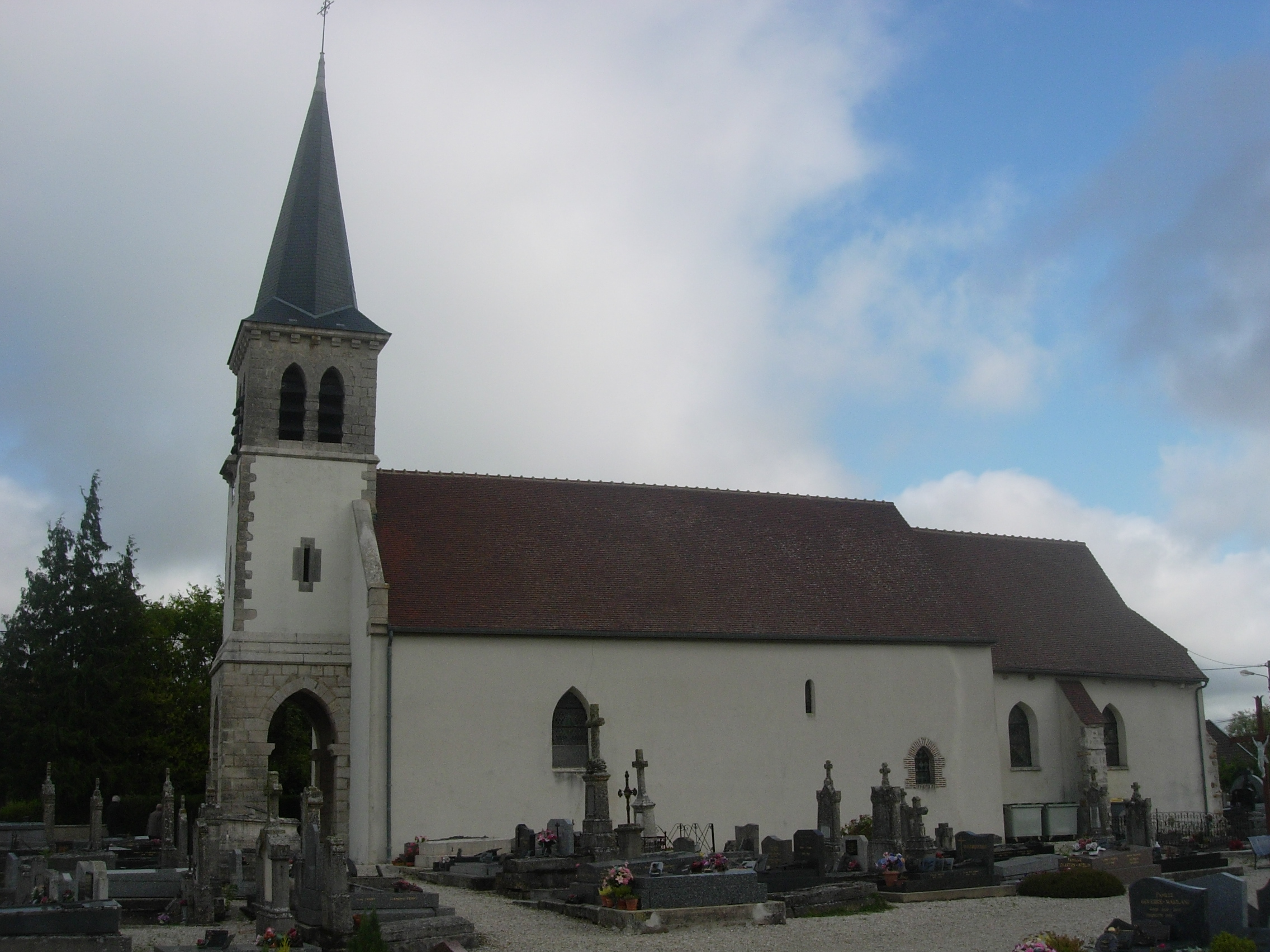
- The church in Ossey-les-Trois-Maisons
- Location of Ossey-les-Trois-Maisons
- Location within France Location within Grand Est
- Coordinates: 48°26′05″N 3°44′18″E
- Country: France
- Region: Grand Est
- Department: Aube
- Arrondissement: Nogent-sur-Seine
- Canton: Saint-Lyé
- Intercommunality: Orvin et Ardusson

Government
  - Mayor (2020–2026): Isabelle Tripier
- Area^{1}: 16.25 km^{2} (6.27 sq mi)
- Elevation: 105 m (344 ft)
- Population (2023): 581
  - Density: 35.8/km^{2} (92.6/sq mi)
- Time zone: UTC+01:00 (CET)
  - Summer (DST): UTC+02:00 (CEST)
- INSEE/Postal code: 10275 /10100
- ^{1} French Land Register data, which excludes lakes, ponds, glaciers > 1 km^{2} (0.386 sq mi or 247 acres) and river estuaries.

Ossey-les-Trois-Maisons (French pronunciation: [ɔsɛ le tʁwɑ mɛzɔ̃]; "Ossey the Three Houses") is a commune in the Aube department in north-central France.

== Population ==
Historical population
Year	Pop.	±% p.a.
1968	476	—
1975	440	−1.12%
1982	371	−2.41%
1990	460	+2.72%
1999	506	+1.06%
2007	566	+1.41%
2012	590	+0.83%
2017	592	+0.07%
2023	581	−0.31%
Source: INSEE

== See also ==
- Communes of the Aube department
