= La Fosse-Corduan =

Commune in Grand Est, France

- Commune
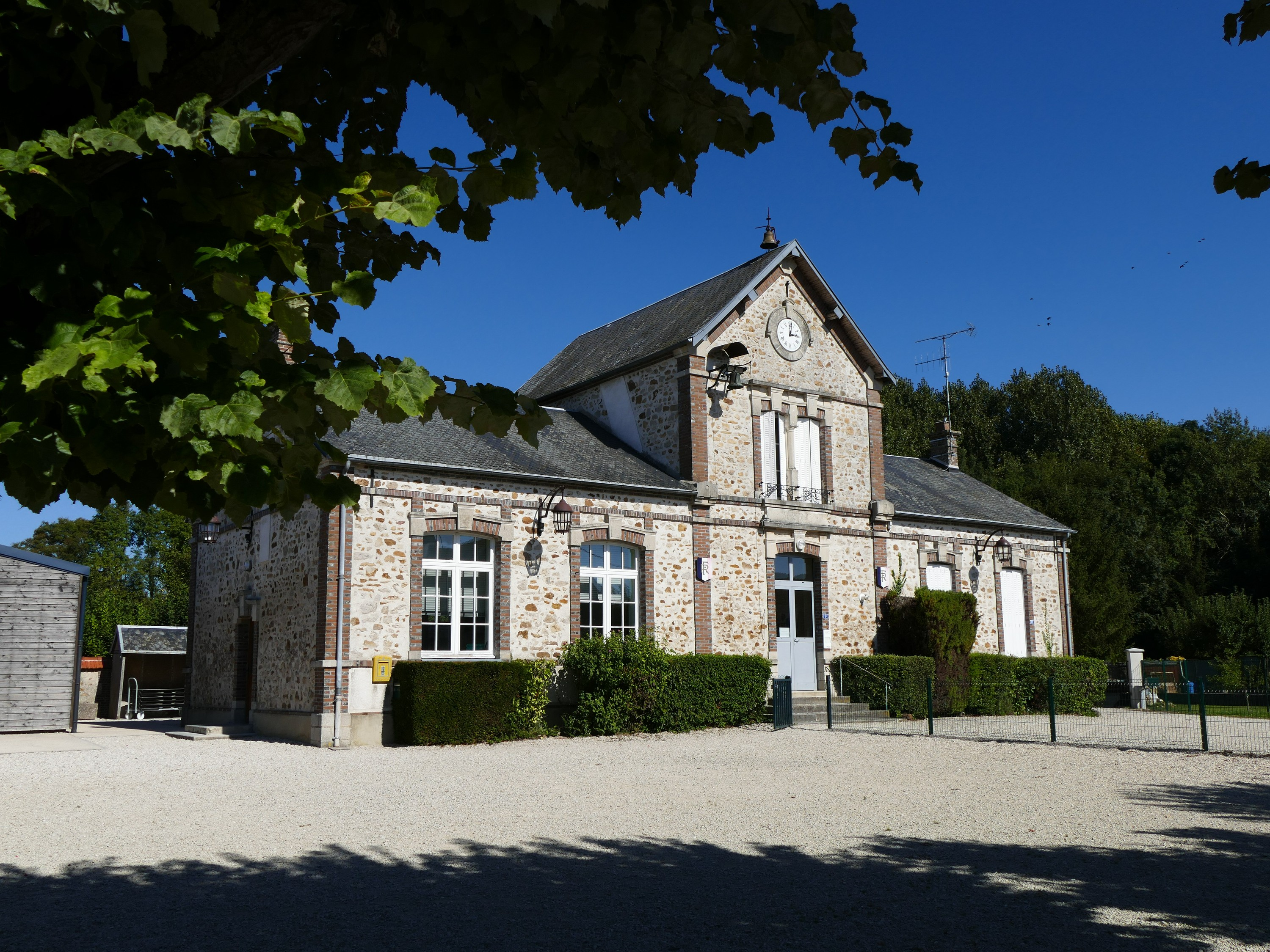
- The town hall in La Fosse-Corduan
- Location of La Fosse-Corduan
- Location within France Location within Grand Est
- Coordinates: 48°26′37″N 3°39′07″E
- Country: France
- Region: Grand Est
- Department: Aube
- Arrondissement: Nogent-sur-Seine
- Canton: Saint-Lyé
- Intercommunality: Orvin et Ardusson

Government
  - Mayor (2020–2026): Frédéric Zammit
- Area^{1}: 3.73 km^{2} (1.44 sq mi)
- Elevation: 95 m (312 ft)
- Population (2023): 213
  - Density: 57.1/km^{2} (148/sq mi)
- Time zone: UTC+01:00 (CET)
  - Summer (DST): UTC+02:00 (CEST)
- INSEE/Postal code: 10157 /10100
- ^{1} French Land Register data, which excludes lakes, ponds, glaciers > 1 km^{2} (0.386 sq mi or 247 acres) and river estuaries.

La Fosse-Corduan (French pronunciation: [la fos kɔʁdɥɑ̃]) is a commune in the Aube department in north-central France.

== Population ==
Historical population
| Year | Pop. | ±% p.a. |
|---|---|---|
| 1968 | 164 | — |
| 1975 | 149 | −1.36% |
| 1982 | 186 | +3.22% |
| 1990 | 170 | −1.12% |
| 1999 | 189 | +1.18% |
| 2007 | 215 | +1.62% |
| 2012 | 211 | −0.37% |
| 2017 | 218 | +0.65% |
| 2023 | 213 | −0.39% |
Source: INSEE

== See also ==
- Communes of the Aube department
