= Saint-Martin-de-Bossenay =

Commune in Grand Est, France

- Commune
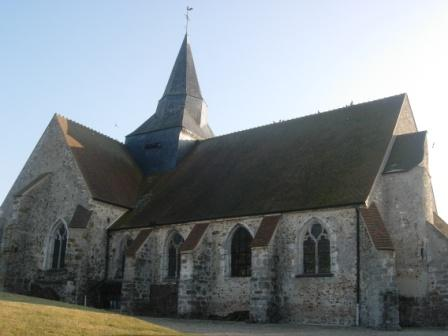
- The church in Saint-Martin-de-Bossenay
- Location of Saint-Martin-de-Bossenay
- Location within France Location within Grand Est
- Coordinates: 48°26′29″N 3°41′01″E
- Country: France
- Region: Grand Est
- Department: Aube
- Arrondissement: Nogent-sur-Seine
- Canton: Saint-Lyé
- Intercommunality: Orvin et Ardusson

Government
  - Mayor (2020–2026): Hervé Payen
- Area^{1}: 16.26 km^{2} (6.28 sq mi)
- Elevation: 100 m (330 ft)
- Population (2023): 342
  - Density: 21.0/km^{2} (54.5/sq mi)
- Time zone: UTC+01:00 (CET)
  - Summer (DST): UTC+02:00 (CEST)
- INSEE/Postal code: 10351 /10100
- ^{1} French Land Register data, which excludes lakes, ponds, glaciers > 1 km^{2} (0.386 sq mi or 247 acres) and river estuaries.

Saint-Martin-de-Bossenay is a commune in the Aube department in north-central France.

== Population ==
Historical population
Year	Pop.	±% p.a.
1968	309	—
1975	317	+0.37%
1982	324	+0.31%
1990	309	−0.59%
1999	316	+0.25%
2007	379	+2.30%
2012	365	−0.75%
2017	368	+0.16%
2023	342	−1.21%
Source: INSEE

== See also ==
- Communes of the Aube department
