= Origny-le-Sec =

Commune in Grand Est, France

- Commune
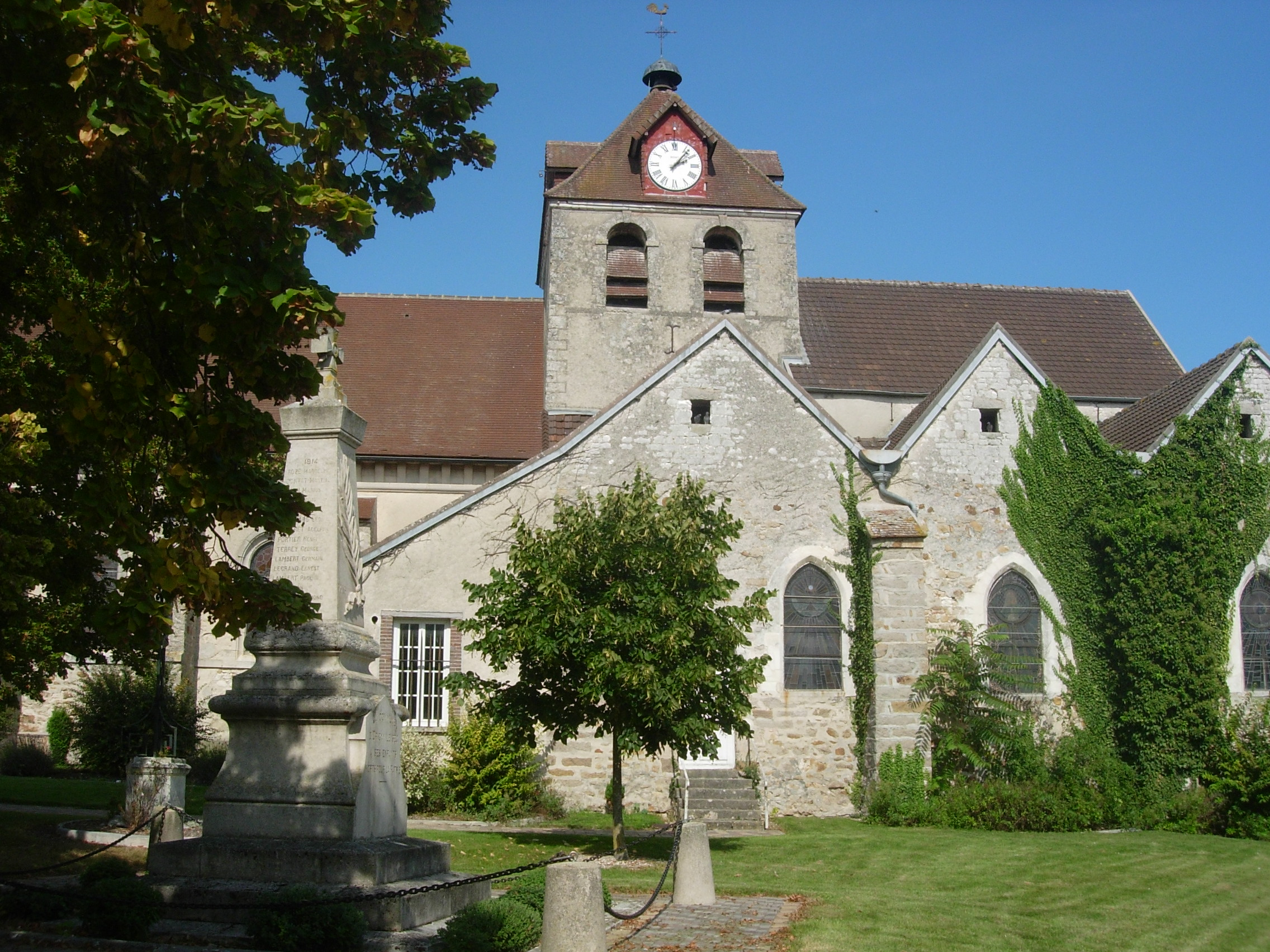
- The church in Origny-le-Sec
- Location of Origny-le-Sec
- Location within France Location within Grand Est
- Coordinates: 48°28′01″N 3°46′28″E
- Country: France
- Region: Grand Est
- Department: Aube
- Arrondissement: Nogent-sur-Seine
- Canton: Saint-Lyé
- Intercommunality: Orvin et Ardusson

Government
  - Mayor (2020–2026): Laurence Duteurtre
- Area^{1}: 16.31 km^{2} (6.30 sq mi)
- Elevation: 109 m (358 ft)
- Population (2023): 604
  - Density: 37.0/km^{2} (95.9/sq mi)
- Time zone: UTC+01:00 (CET)
  - Summer (DST): UTC+02:00 (CEST)
- INSEE/Postal code: 10271 /10510
- ^{1} French Land Register data, which excludes lakes, ponds, glaciers > 1 km^{2} (0.386 sq mi or 247 acres) and river estuaries.

Origny-le-Sec is a commune in the Aube department in north-central France.

== Population ==
Historical population
Year	Pop.	±% p.a.
1968	549	—
1975	475	−2.05%
1982	636	+4.26%
1990	627	−0.18%
1999	593	−0.62%
2007	606	+0.27%
2012	656	+1.60%
2017	606	−1.57%
2023	604	−0.06%
Source: INSEE

== See also ==
- Communes of the Aube department
