= Marigny-le-Châtel =

Commune in Grand Est, France

- Commune
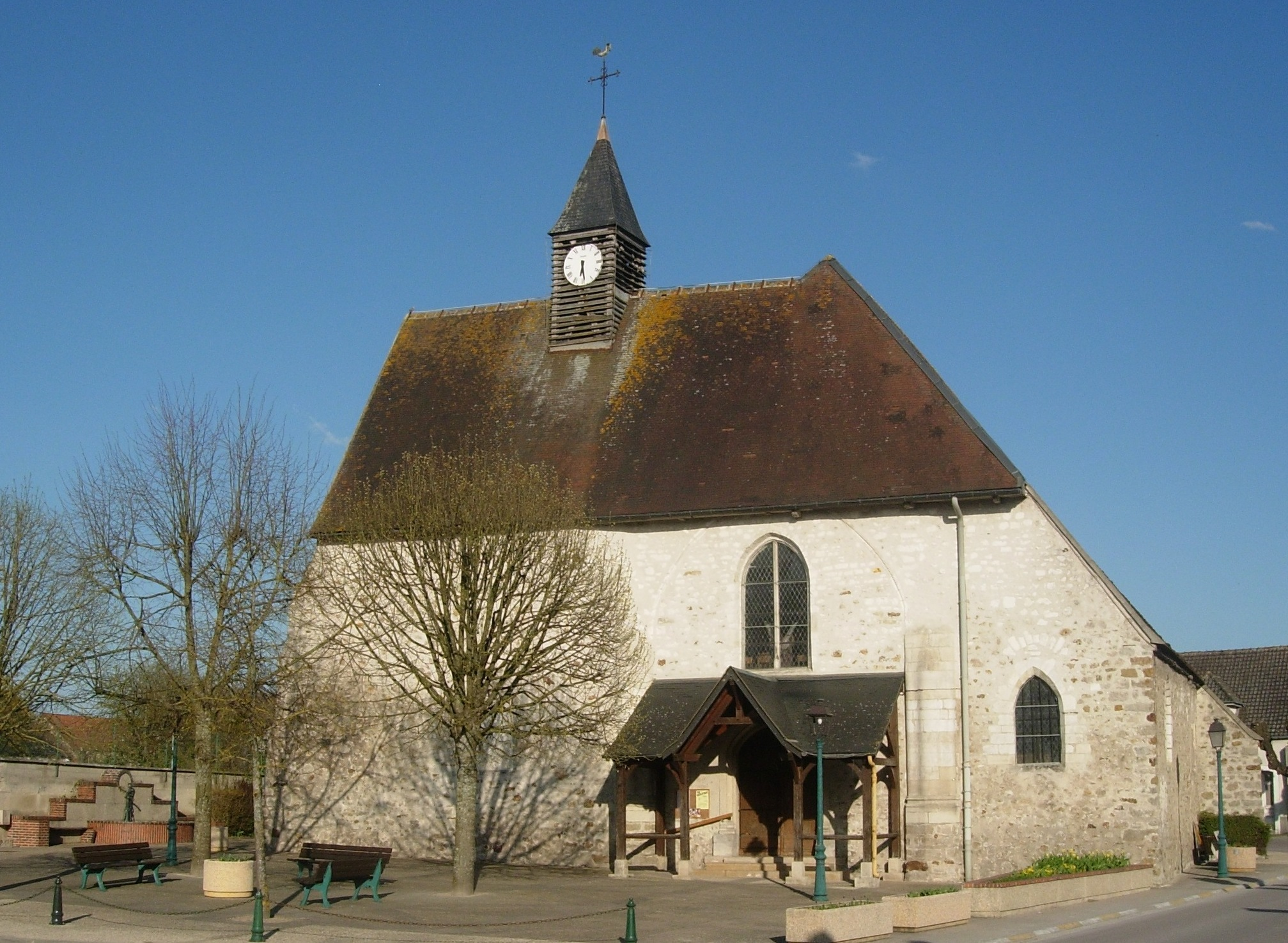
- The church in Marigny-le-Châtel
- Location of Marigny-le-Châtel
- Location within France Location within Grand Est
- Coordinates: 48°24′11″N 3°44′16″E
- Country: France
- Region: Grand Est
- Department: Aube
- Arrondissement: Nogent-sur-Seine
- Canton: Saint-Lyé
- Intercommunality: Orvin et Ardusson

Government
  - Mayor (2020–2026): Philippe Thiriot
- Area^{1}: 20.31 km^{2} (7.84 sq mi)
- Highest elevation: 180 m (590 ft)
- Lowest elevation: 104 m (341 ft)
- Population (2023): 1,749
  - Density: 86.12/km^{2} (223.0/sq mi)
- Time zone: UTC+01:00 (CET)
  - Summer (DST): UTC+02:00 (CEST)
- INSEE/Postal code: 10224 /10350
- ^{1} French Land Register data, which excludes lakes, ponds, glaciers > 1 km^{2} (0.386 sq mi or 247 acres) and river estuaries.

Marigny-le-Châtel (French pronunciation: [maʁiɲi lə ʃatɛl]) is a commune in the Aube department in north-central France.

== Population ==
Historical population
| Year | Pop. | ±% p.a. |
|---|---|---|
| 1968 | 1,029 | — |
| 1975 | 1,095 | +0.89% |
| 1982 | 1,311 | +2.61% |
| 1990 | 1,540 | +2.03% |
| 1999 | 1,518 | −0.16% |
| 2007 | 1,554 | +0.29% |
| 2012 | 1,695 | +1.75% |
| 2017 | 1,752 | +0.66% |
| 2023 | 1,749 | −0.03% |
Source: INSEE

== See also ==
- Communes of the Aube department
