= Rigny-la-Nonneuse =

Commune in Grand Est, France

- Commune
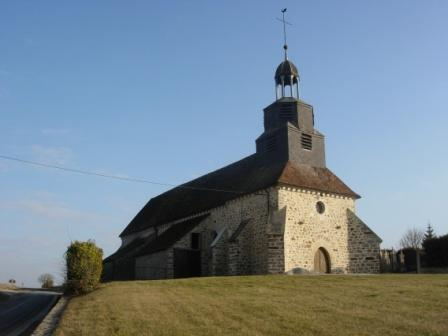
- The church in Rigny-la-Nonneuse
- Location of Rigny-la-Nonneuse
- Location within France Location within Grand Est
- Coordinates: 48°24′41″N 3°39′48″E
- Country: France
- Region: Grand Est
- Department: Aube
- Arrondissement: Nogent-sur-Seine
- Canton: Saint-Lyé
- Intercommunality: Orvin et Ardusson

Government
  - Mayor (2020–2026): Agnès Mignot
- Area^{1}: 18.19 km^{2} (7.02 sq mi)
- Elevation: 106 m (348 ft)
- Population (2023): 158
  - Density: 8.69/km^{2} (22.5/sq mi)
- Time zone: UTC+01:00 (CET)
  - Summer (DST): UTC+02:00 (CEST)
- INSEE/Postal code: 10318 /10290
- ^{1} French Land Register data, which excludes lakes, ponds, glaciers > 1 km^{2} (0.386 sq mi or 247 acres) and river estuaries.

Rigny-la-Nonneuse (French pronunciation: [ʁiɲi la nɔnøz]) is a commune in the Aube department in north-central France.

== Population ==
Historical population
Year	Pop.	±% p.a.
1968	87	—
1975	69	−3.26%
1982	90	+3.87%
1990	96	+0.81%
1999	145	+4.69%
2007	135	−0.89%
2012	143	+1.16%
2017	171	+3.64%
2023	158	−1.31%
Source: INSEE

== See also ==
- Communes of the Aube department
