= Saint-Loup-de-Buffigny =

Commune in Grand Est, France

- Commune
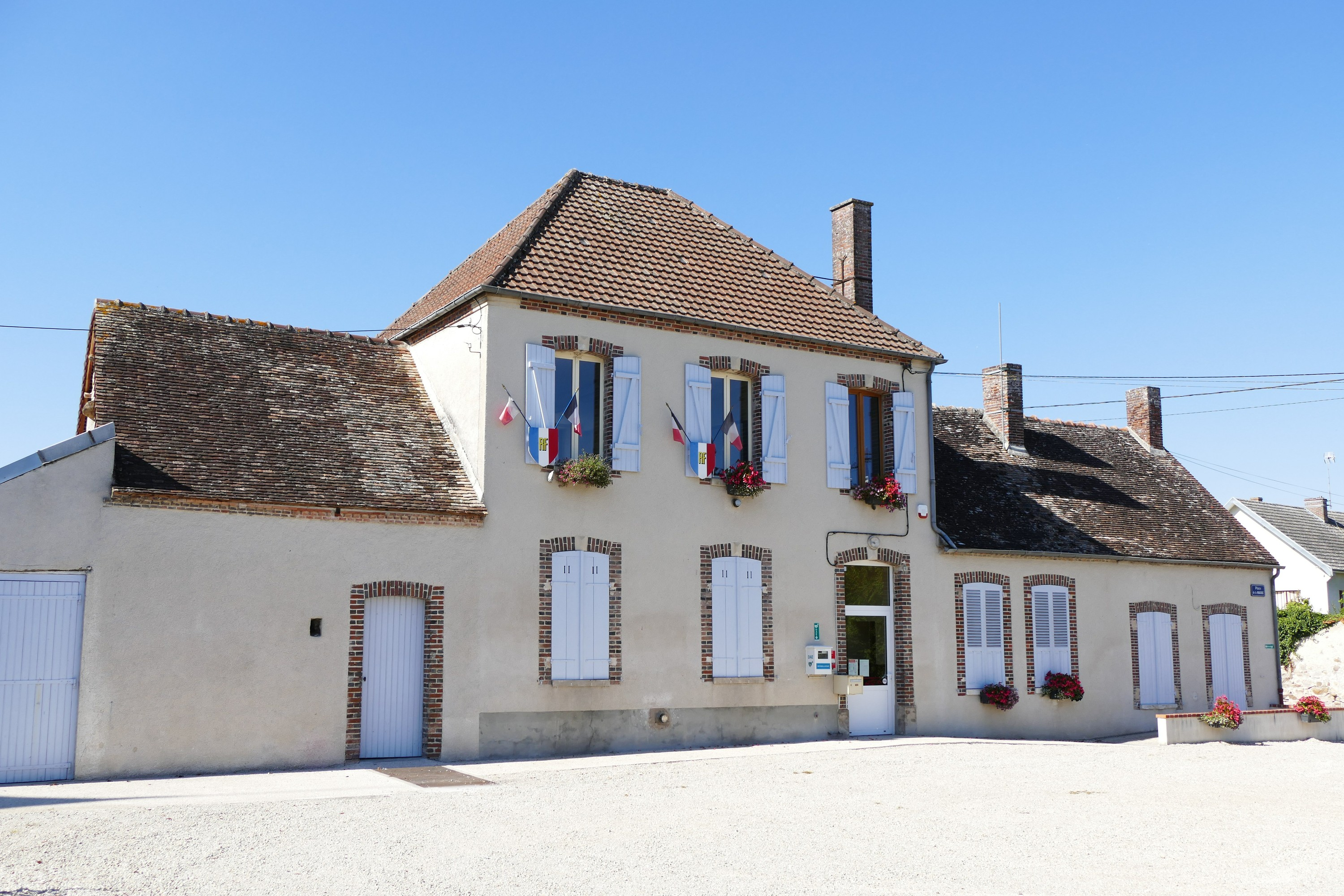
- The town hall in Saint-Loup-de-Buffigny
- Location of Saint-Loup-de-Buffigny
- Location within France Location within Grand Est
- Coordinates: 48°27′06″N 3°38′06″E
- Country: France
- Region: Grand Est
- Department: Aube
- Arrondissement: Nogent-sur-Seine
- Canton: Saint-Lyé
- Intercommunality: Orvin et Ardusson

Government
  - Mayor (2020–2026): Alain Schatteman
- Area^{1}: 10.16 km^{2} (3.92 sq mi)
- Elevation: 91 m (299 ft)
- Population (2023): 216
  - Density: 21.3/km^{2} (55.1/sq mi)
- Time zone: UTC+01:00 (CET)
  - Summer (DST): UTC+02:00 (CEST)
- INSEE/Postal code: 10347 /10100
- ^{1} French Land Register data, which excludes lakes, ponds, glaciers > 1 km^{2} (0.386 sq mi or 247 acres) and river estuaries.

Saint-Loup-de-Buffigny (French pronunciation: [sɛ̃ lu də byfiɲi]) is a commune in the Aube department in north-central France.

== Population ==
Historical population
Year	Pop.	±% p.a.
1968	137	—
1975	141	+0.41%
1982	154	+1.27%
1990	161	+0.56%
1999	164	+0.21%
2007	178	+1.03%
2012	213	+3.66%
2017	210	−0.28%
2023	216	+0.47%
Source: INSEE

== See also ==
- Communes of the Aube department
