= Marcilly-le-Hayer =

Commune in Grand Est, France

- Commune
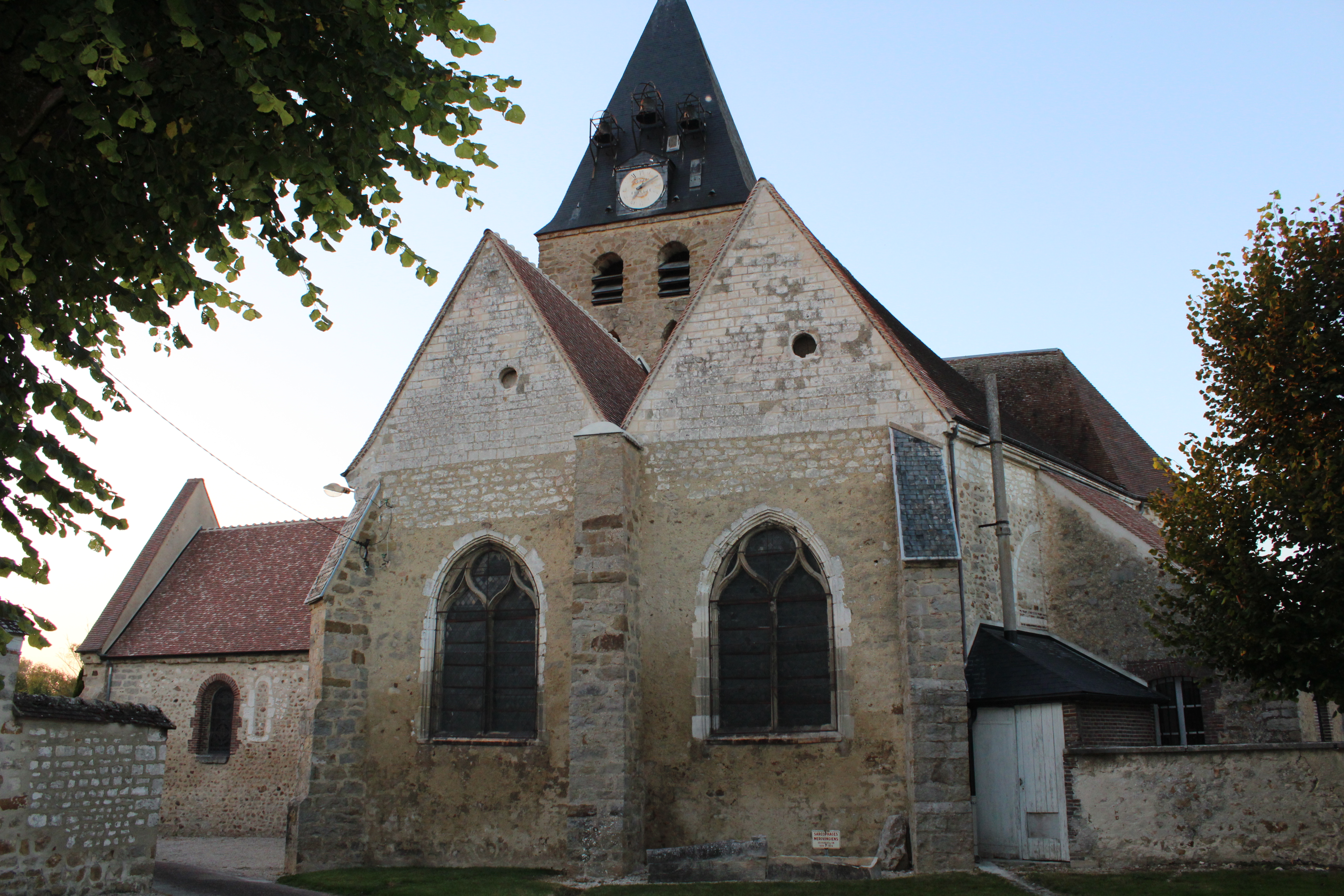
- The church in Marcilly-le-Hayer

- Coat of arms
- Location of Marcilly-le-Hayer
- Location within France Location within Grand Est
- Coordinates: 48°20′54″N 3°38′11″E
- Country: France
- Region: Grand Est
- Department: Aube
- Arrondissement: Nogent-sur-Seine
- Canton: Saint-Lyé
- Intercommunality: Orvin et Ardusson

Government
  - Mayor (2020–2026): Jean-Marie Camut
- Area^{1}: 34.34 km^{2} (13.26 sq mi)
- Elevation: 123 m (404 ft)
- Population (2023): 706
  - Density: 20.6/km^{2} (53.2/sq mi)
- Time zone: UTC+01:00 (CET)
  - Summer (DST): UTC+02:00 (CEST)
- INSEE/Postal code: 10223 /10290
- ^{1} French Land Register data, which excludes lakes, ponds, glaciers > 1 km^{2} (0.386 sq mi or 247 acres) and river estuaries.

Marcilly-le-Hayer (French pronunciation: [maʁsiji lə aje]) is a commune in the Aube department in north-central France.

== Population ==
Historical population
Year	Pop.	±% p.a.
1968	464	—
1975	471	+0.21%
1982	582	+3.07%
1990	630	+1.00%
1999	702	+1.21%
2007	673	−0.53%
2012	702	+0.85%
2017	725	+0.65%
2023	706	−0.44%
Source: INSEE

== See also ==
- Communes of the Aube department
