= Pothières =

- Commune
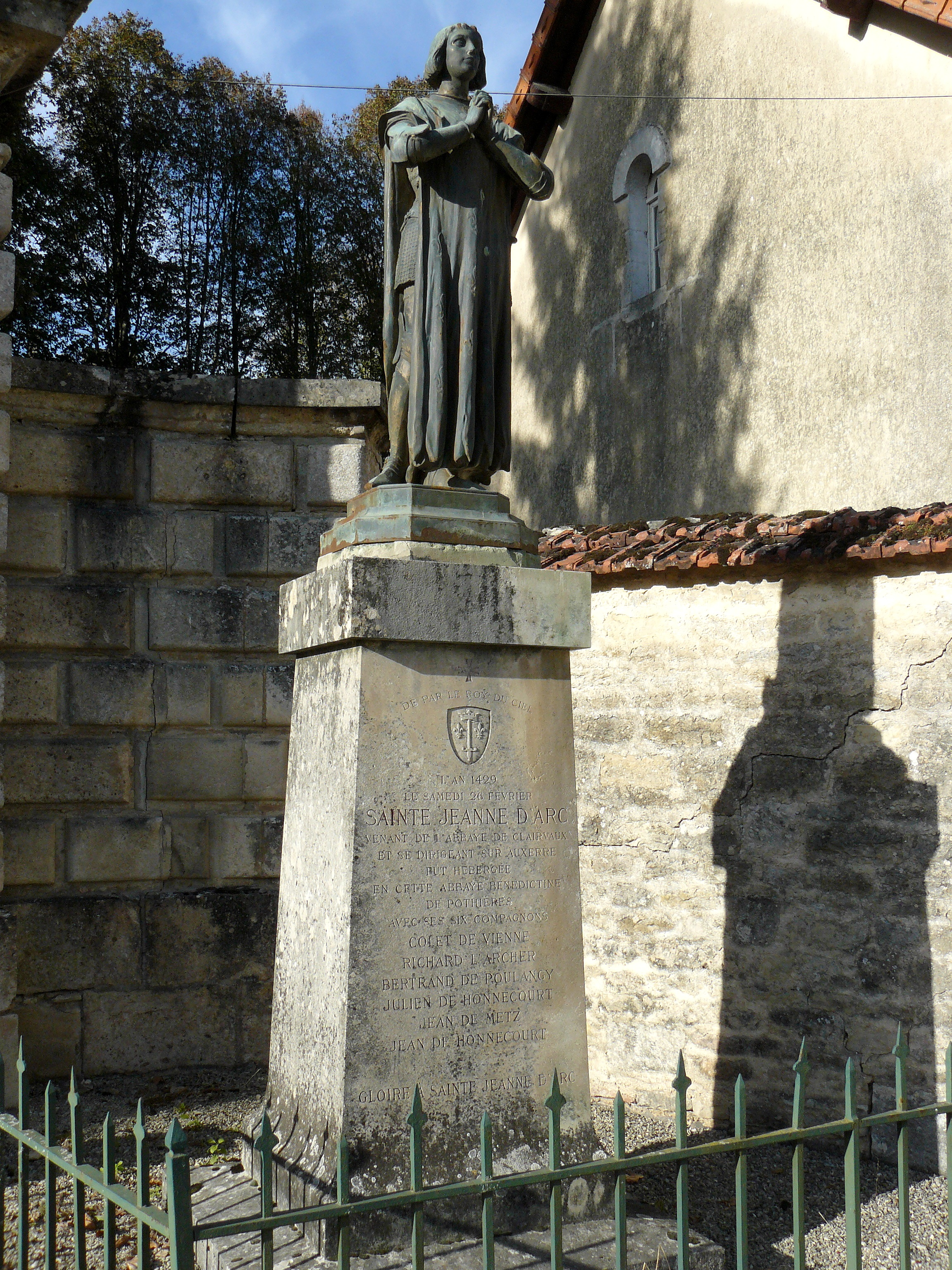
- Monument commemorating the passage of Joan of Arc

- Coat of arms
- Location of Pothières
- Location within France Location within Bourgogne-Franche-Comté
- Coordinates: 47°55′24″N 4°31′14″E
- Country: France
- Region: Bourgogne-Franche-Comté
- Department: Côte-d'Or
- Arrondissement: Montbard
- Canton: Châtillon-sur-Seine
- Intercommunality: Pays Châtillonnais

Government
  - Mayor (2020–2026): Jean-Pierre Schaeffer
- Area^{1}: 17.86 km^{2} (6.90 sq mi)
- Elevation: 202 m (663 ft)
- Highest elevation: 341 m (1,119 ft)
- Lowest elevation: 193 m (633 ft)
- Population (2023): 189
  - Density: 10.6/km^{2} (27.4/sq mi)
- Time zone: UTC+01:00 (CET)
  - Summer (DST): UTC+02:00 (CEST)
- INSEE/Postal code: 21499 /21400
- ^{1} French Land Register data, which excludes lakes, ponds, glaciers > 1 km^{2} (0.386 sq mi or 247 acres) and river estuaries.

Pothières (French pronunciation: [pɔtjɛʁ]) is a commune in the Côte-d'Or department in eastern France.

== Population ==
Historical population
Year	Pop.	±% p.a.
1968	233	—
1975	210	−1.47%
1982	212	+0.14%
1990	232	+1.13%
1999	204	−1.42%
2007	191	−0.82%
2012	214	+2.30%
2017	207	−0.66%
2023	189	−1.50%
Source: INSEE

== See also ==
- Communes of the Côte-d'Or department
