= Pouy-sur-Vannes =

Commune in Grand Est, France

- Commune
- Location of Pouy-sur-Vannes
- Location within France Location within Grand Est
- Coordinates: 48°18′28″N 3°35′24″E
- Country: France
- Region: Grand Est
- Department: Aube
- Arrondissement: Nogent-sur-Seine
- Canton: Saint-Lyé
- Intercommunality: Orvin et Ardusson

Government
  - Mayor (2020–2026): Jacky Richer
- Area^{1}: 15.82 km^{2} (6.11 sq mi)
- Elevation: 139 m (456 ft)
- Population (2023): 177
  - Density: 11.2/km^{2} (29.0/sq mi)
- Time zone: UTC+01:00 (CET)
  - Summer (DST): UTC+02:00 (CEST)
- INSEE/Postal code: 10301 /10290
- ^{1} French Land Register data, which excludes lakes, ponds, glaciers > 1 km^{2} (0.386 sq mi or 247 acres) and river estuaries.

Pouy-sur-Vannes (French pronunciation: [pwi syʁ van]) is a commune in the Aube department in north-central France.

== Population ==
Historical population
Year	Pop.	±% p.a.
1968	226	—
1975	198	−1.87%
1982	179	−1.43%
1990	170	−0.64%
1999	136	−2.45%
2007	143	+0.63%
2012	146	+0.42%
2017	156	+1.33%
2023	177	+2.13%
Source: INSEE

== See also ==
- Communes of the Aube department
