= Orvilliers-Saint-Julien =

Commune in Grand Est, France

- Commune
- Coat of arms
- Location of Orvilliers-Saint-Julien
- Location within France Location within Grand Est
- Coordinates: 48°26′41″N 3°49′42″E
- Country: France
- Region: Grand Est
- Department: Aube
- Arrondissement: Nogent-sur-Seine
- Canton: Saint-Lyé
- Intercommunality: Orvin et Ardusson

Government
  - Mayor (2020–2026): Pascal Groia
- Area^{1}: 23.92 km^{2} (9.24 sq mi)
- Elevation: 102 m (335 ft)
- Population (2023): 313
  - Density: 13.1/km^{2} (33.9/sq mi)
- Time zone: UTC+01:00 (CET)
  - Summer (DST): UTC+02:00 (CEST)
- INSEE/Postal code: 10274 /10170
- ^{1} French Land Register data, which excludes lakes, ponds, glaciers > 1 km^{2} (0.386 sq mi or 247 acres) and river estuaries.

Orvilliers-Saint-Julien (French pronunciation: [ɔʁvilje sɛ̃ ʒyljɛ̃]) is a commune in the Aube department in north-central France.

== Population ==
Historical population
| Year | Pop. | ±% p.a. |
|---|---|---|
| 1968 | 266 | — |
| 1975 | 240 | −1.46% |
| 1982 | 226 | −0.85% |
| 1990 | 226 | +0.00% |
| 1999 | 211 | −0.76% |
| 2007 | 281 | +3.65% |
| 2012 | 316 | +2.38% |
| 2017 | 311 | −0.32% |
| 2023 | 313 | +0.11% |
Source: INSEE

== See also ==
- Communes of the Aube department
