= Saint-Lyé =

Commune in Grand Est, France

- Commune
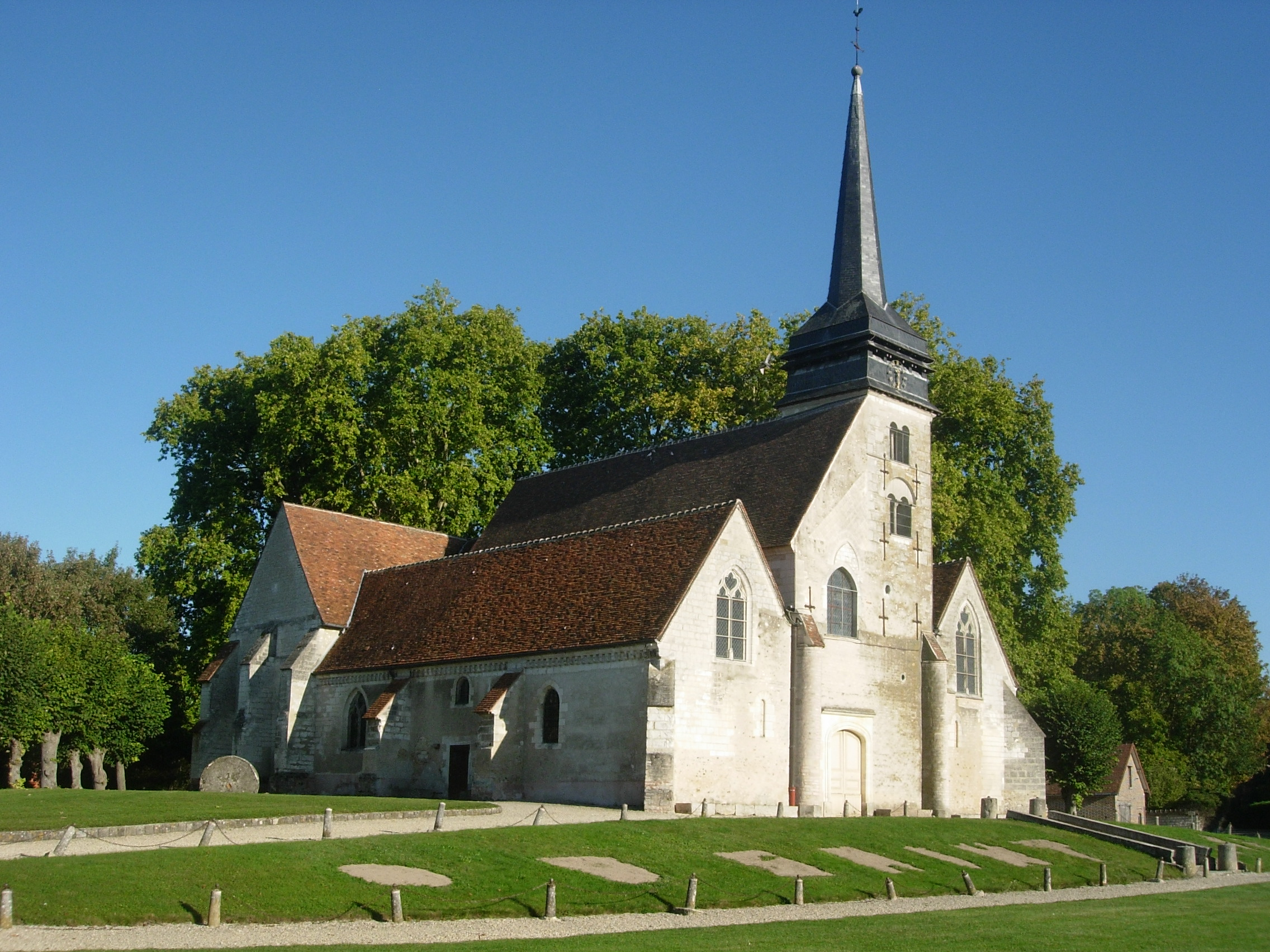
- The church in Saint-Lyé

- Coat of arms
- Location of Saint-Lyé
- Location within France Location within Grand Est
- Coordinates: 48°21′51″N 4°00′07″E
- Country: France
- Region: Grand Est
- Department: Aube
- Arrondissement: Troyes
- Canton: Saint-Lyé
- Intercommunality: CA Troyes Champagne Métropole

Government
  - Mayor (2020–2026): Nicolas Mennetrier
- Area^{1}: 32.7 km^{2} (12.6 sq mi)
- Elevation: 101 m (331 ft)
- Highest elevation: 212 m (696 ft)
- Lowest elevation: 92 m (302 ft)
- Population (2023): 2,956
  - Density: 90.4/km^{2} (234/sq mi)
- Time zone: UTC+01:00 (CET)
  - Summer (DST): UTC+02:00 (CEST)
- INSEE/Postal code: 10349 /10180
- ^{1} French Land Register data, which excludes lakes, ponds, glaciers > 1 km^{2} (0.386 sq mi or 247 acres) and river estuaries.

Saint-Lyé (French pronunciation: [sɛ̃ lje]) is a commune in the Aube department in north-central France.

== Population ==
Historical population
| Year | Pop. | ±% p.a. |
|---|---|---|
| 1968 | 1,258 | — |
| 1975 | 1,795 | +5.21% |
| 1982 | 2,189 | +2.88% |
| 1990 | 2,496 | +1.65% |
| 1999 | 2,633 | +0.60% |
| 2007 | 2,841 | +0.95% |
| 2012 | 2,889 | +0.34% |
| 2017 | 2,915 | +0.18% |
| 2023 | 2,956 | +0.23% |
Source: INSEE

== See also ==
- Communes of the Aube department
