= Saint-Lupien =

Commune in Grand Est, France

- Commune
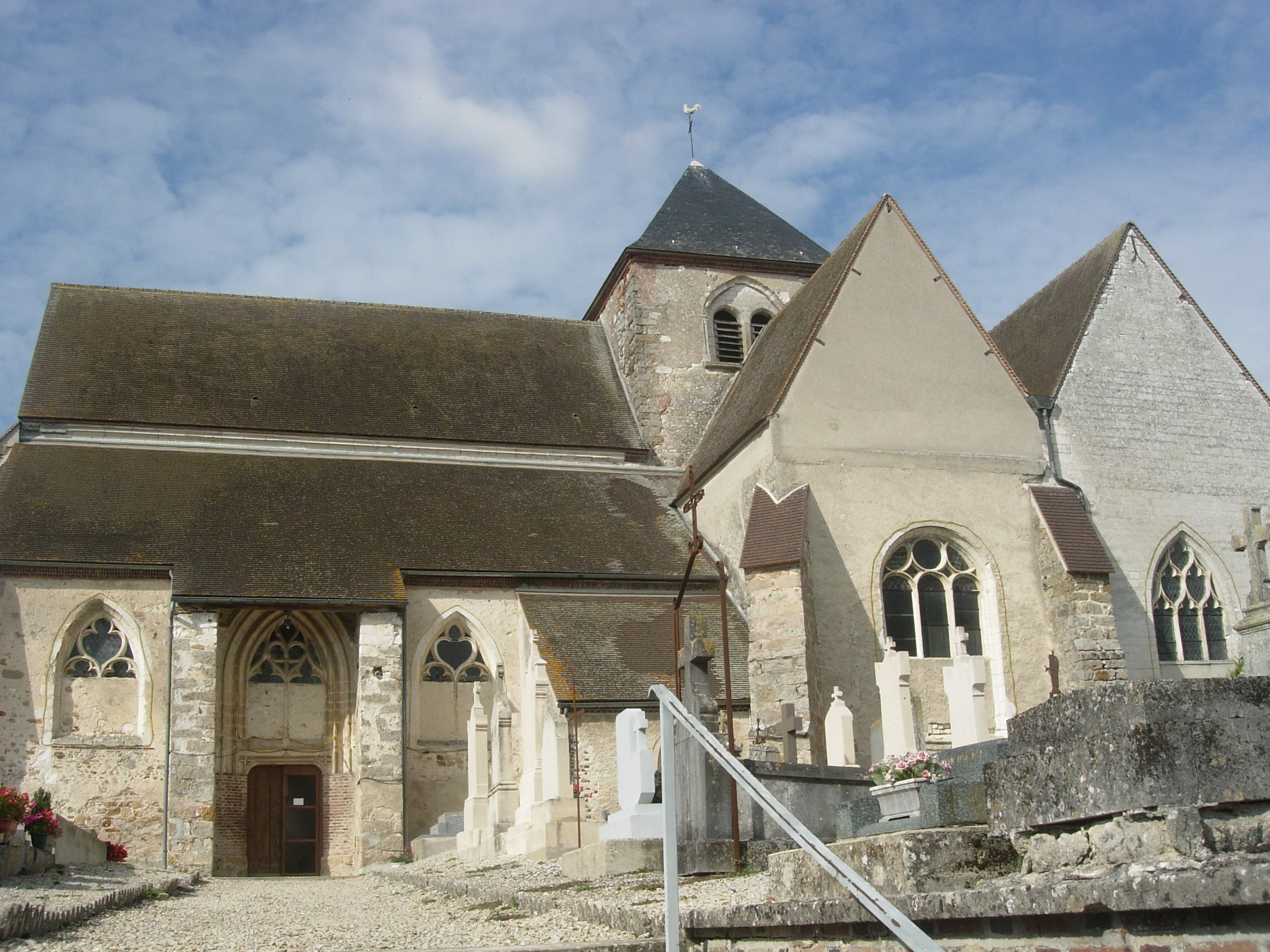
- The church in Saint-Lupien

- Coat of arms
- Location of Saint-Lupien
- Location within France Location within Grand Est
- Coordinates: 48°21′30″N 3°42′11″E
- Country: France
- Region: Grand Est
- Department: Aube
- Arrondissement: Nogent-sur-Seine
- Canton: Saint-Lyé
- Intercommunality: Orvin et Ardusson

Government
  - Mayor (2020–2026): Nicolas Juillet
- Area^{1}: 22.92 km^{2} (8.85 sq mi)
- Elevation: 132 m (433 ft)
- Population (2023): 231
  - Density: 10.1/km^{2} (26.1/sq mi)
- Time zone: UTC+01:00 (CET)
  - Summer (DST): UTC+02:00 (CEST)
- INSEE/Postal code: 10348 /10350
- ^{1} French Land Register data, which excludes lakes, ponds, glaciers > 1 km^{2} (0.386 sq mi or 247 acres) and river estuaries.

Saint-Lupien (French pronunciation: [sɛ̃ lypjɛ̃]) is a commune in the Aube department in north-central France.

== Population ==
Historical population
Year	Pop.	±% p.a.
1968	188	—
1975	181	−0.54%
1982	180	−0.08%
1990	218	+2.42%
1999	222	+0.20%
2007	231	+0.50%
2012	249	+1.51%
2017	236	−1.07%
2023	231	−0.36%
Source: INSEE

== See also ==
- Communes of the Aube department
