= Léon Schwab =

French cloth merchant, lawyer and politician

Mayor of Épinal
- In office December 9, 1938 – March 1, 1945
- Preceded by: Augustin Baudouin
- Succeeded by: August Thiétry
- In office September 25, 1944 – May 20, 1945
- Preceded by: Henry Najean
- Succeeded by: Alfred Thinesse

Personal details
- Born: November 28, 1862 Épinal (Vosges)
- Died: February 5, 1962 (aged 99) Épinal (Vosges)
- Spouse: Hélène Hirsch
- Education: University of Nancy
- Profession: Historian, politician, lawyer

Léon Schwab, born November 28, 1862, in Épinal and died February 5, 1962, in the same town, was a French politician.

A cloth merchant, then a lawyer, he also took an interest in the history of the French Revolution as part of a departmental committee. After enlisting as a volunteer in World War I and being awarded the Chevalier de la Légion d'Honneur for the victory at La Fontenelle, he served on the municipal council of his home town, Épinal, before becoming mayor from December 9, 1938, to March 1, 1941. Dismissed on racial grounds under the Vichy regime, he was reinstated by the people of Épinal on September 25, 1944, but was defeated in the municipal elections held on May 20 the following year.

Thereafter, he continued to take part in the major events in the life of his city, becoming its dean and an active patriarch, particularly in terms of town planning and culture.

== Biography ==
=== Family and youth ===
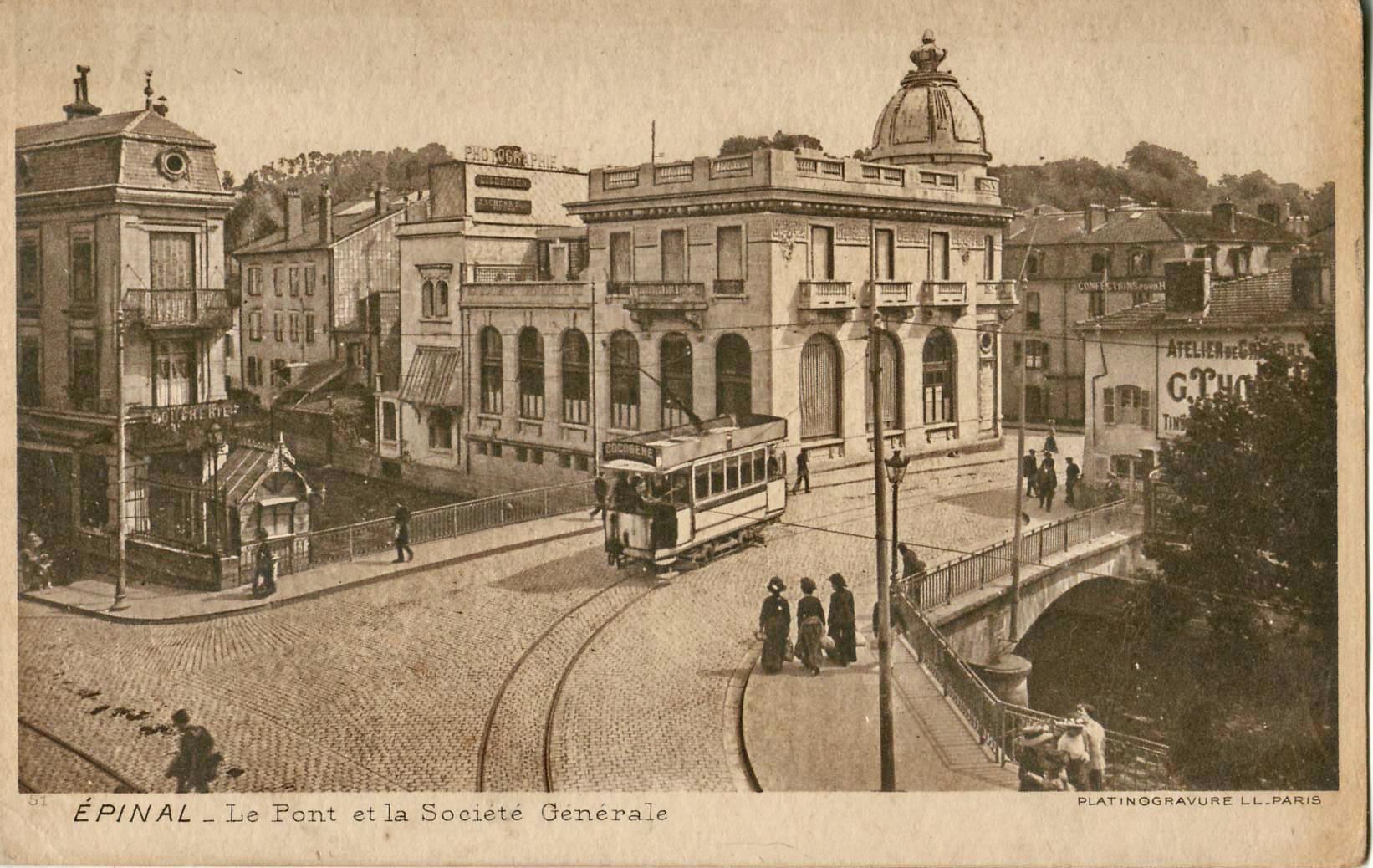
Épinal circa 1910.

Léon Schwab was born on November 28, 1862, at 30 rue Rualménil (Note: The house was destroyed by fire on June 19, 1940, and stood on the site of the current number 11 of the rebuilt street.) in Épinal, prefecture of the Vosges department, the son of Élie Schwab (1833–1897), a cloth merchant and commercial court judge of Jewish faith, himself born in Remiremont to a peddler. His mother, Mathilde Brié (1840–1920), was born in Blâmont (Meurthe-et-Moselle). At the age of five, Léon saw Emperor Napoléon III pass by in a horse-drawn carriage on his way down from Épinal station to Plombières, where he went for his last crenotherapy session before the fall of the Empire. The child had a younger sister, Alice, in 1865. At the time, the Schwab family lived in a busy, industrial and commercial district, in a town with a population of 10,359 according to the 1861 census.

At the outbreak of the 1870 war, seven-year-old Léon made sure, despite his mother's prohibition, to go with his friends to see the Prussians advance on the Côte de la Justice. For his part, his father had helped Adrien Sadoul, father of Lorraine historian Charles Sadoul (1872–1930) and grandfather of film historian Georges Sadoul (1904–1967), to get out of town quickly. This was followed by a period of Prussian occupation, as a result of the five-billion-franc indemnity to be paid by defeated France, during which the family home was requisitioned to house Germans until the end of July 1873.

While France was preparing for the Revenge, in particular by building the Séré de Rivières system, of which the stronghold of Épinal was an essential link, Léon Schwab continued at school. He entered the town's collège at the beginning of October 1870, a few days before the arrival of the Prussians. Elementary school only became free, secular and compulsory in 1881–1882, with the Jules Ferry laws. Léon crossed the Grand Pont every day to reach the entrance to the school, founded by the Jesuits in 1668 and rebuilt in the 1720s. It was demolished in 1894 to build a new, larger school, when he had just turned 31.

=== Education and family life ===
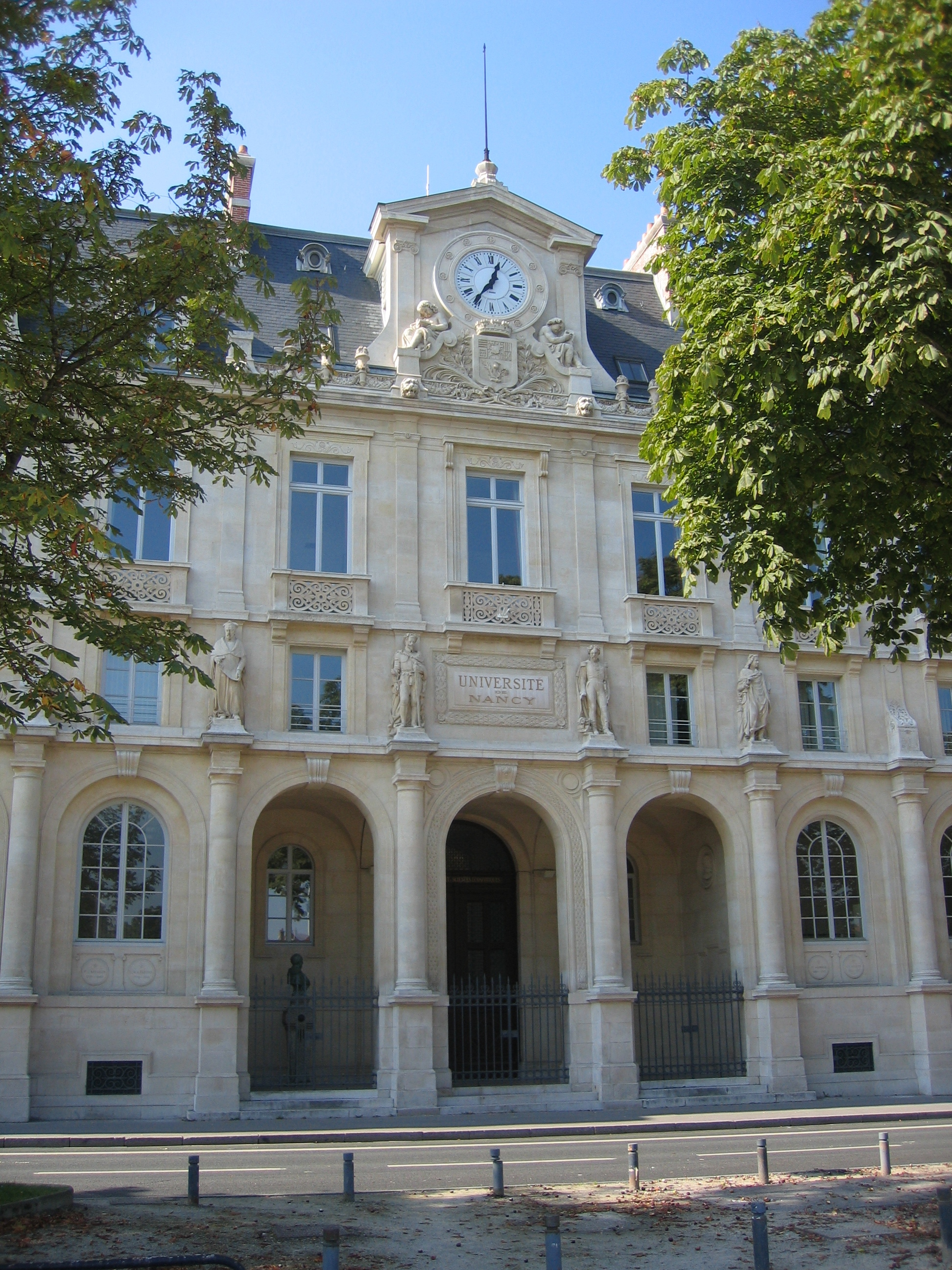
Nancy Law Faculty.

In the early 1880s, he studied law at the university of Nancy, built in 1858. (Note: In 1881, the Faculty of Letters had only 61 students.) In the 1886 Épinal census, Léon Schwab was listed as a lawyer, living with his parents. However, he was not admitted to the Épinal bar until 1920, and continued his legal studies with the defense of his doctoral thesis in 1902, on the subject of the general strike, whose origin, purpose, characteristics, means and obstacles he studied.

He worked as a cloth merchant in the family store until 1906. The 1886 census recorded the presence of three store clerks, a traveling salesman and a servant, all housed in the house at 30 rue Rualménil. Léon was also first violin in the Épinal Philharmonic Society, which he played throughout his life. On April 2, 1895, at the age of 32, he married Hélène Hirsch, born on February 5, 1876, daughter of Abraham Hirsch, chief architect for the city of Lyon and Officer of the Legion of Honor, at the town hall in Lyon's 6th arrondissement. They had two children, Pierre, born in 1896, and Marthe, born in 1898. Hélène died on February 19, 1900, at the age of 24. Léon remained a widower for sixty-two years. Pierre (1896–1986) was president of the Tribunal de Grande Instance de Péronne (Somme). Marthe married Jean Schwed, a notary in Troyes, who was shot by the Germans on February 28, 1942, and posthumously awarded the "Mort pour la France" medal.

=== Historian of the French Revolution and lawyer ===
After 47 years in rue Rualménil, Léon Schwab moved in 1909 to a newly built house at 19 bis rue Thiers, where he eventually stayed for 53 years, thus remaining a lifelong resident of the Cité des Images. The five years preceding the Great War were devoted to studying the economic history of the French Revolution in the Vosges. He was thus listed as a "publicist" in the 1911 census. He took an active part in military operations and spent little time in Épinal. From 1920 to 1937, he practiced law in an office on the first floor of his home. He was admitted to the Épinal bar at the age of almost 58, and served as President of the Vosges Bar for two years.

As early as 1907, Léon Schwab was a member of the Comité départemental created that same year for the economic study of the French Revolution in the département of his birth, which published a quarterly bulletin of recognized quality until 1939. It was called La Révolution dans les Vosges. It was an initiative of the Chamber of Deputies, under the impetus of Jean Jaurès. Chaired and founded by André Philippe, Departamental archivist, the Comité départemental had Schwab as one of its main collaborators (he is also cited as the founder of the bulletin). On March 5, 1910, he was named Officier d'Académie and later Officier de l'Instruction Publique, distinctions which since 1955 have corresponded to the grades of Chevalier and Officier in the Ordre des Palmes Académiques. He wrote some 73 articles, representing 600 printed pages. The two volumes he published in Épinal in 1911 and 1913 on the sale of national property in the Épinal and Remiremont districts were used by Jaurès in his Histoire de la Révolution française.

=== Patriot and republican in the face of world conflicts ===
Republican and patriot, Léon Schwab, aged 51, signed up for the entire duration of the 1914 conflict. He was appointed Captain of the 43rd Territorial Infantry Regiment on July 31, 1914, and Commander of the same regiment on March 31, 1915. He took part in the Vosges, La Fontenelle, Champagne and Reims campaigns. The capture of Fontenelle, located six kilometers north of Saint-Dié, on the heights between the Meurthe and Rabodeau rivers, is recorded as a major feat of arms in the upper right-hand corner of the Épinal war memorial. His victorious command at La Fontenelle earned him a mention in the Army Order and a Chevalier de la Légion d'Honneur.

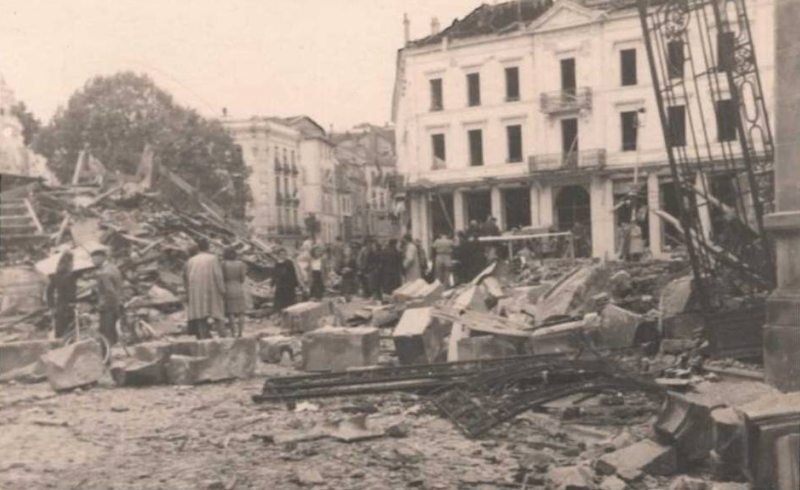
The Place des 4 Nations when the city was liberated by the Allies in 1944.

Léon Schwab returned to his home town after the war and was elected town councillor in 1919, then deputy mayor from 1924 to 1938. In the run-up to the war and three months after the fruitless Munich Agreement, Léon Schwab, an emulator of Léon Blum, (Note: p. 220.) was elected mayor of his home town in December 1938, at the age of 76, after 14 years as deputy to Augustin Baudoin, mayor from 1919 to 1938. On June 19, 1940, when a large part of the island in the center of Épinal was burnt down (including his birthplace) and the town bombed, he went to the Place des Vosges in his capacity as mayor, to meet the leaders of the victorious German army. He was accompanied by one of his deputies, Maître H. Najean and Messrs Jouy and Jacques. (Note: p. 221.)

Forced to resign on December 20, 1940, due to the racial laws, he was officially dismissed as mayor on March 1, 1941, by the Vichy government. The reason given was his Jewish faith. He was replaced by a man named Thiethry, after an interim appointment by H. Najean. He remained in the service of Spinaliens despite threats that led to his arrest by German authorities on October 22, 1943. He was molested several times. He was imprisoned for a few days in Épinal and for three weeks in the Charles III prison in Nancy as a common law prisoner. He was then transferred to Écrouves prison for deportation, but only stayed there a day before being hospitalized in Toul due to his state of health. It was there that he was liberated on September 2, 1944, before returning to Épinal on September 25, where the population, liberated the day before, triumphantly reinstalled him in the town hall.

Eight months later, at the head of one of the three lists for the municipal elections, he was defeated on May 20, 1945, by Dr. Alfred Thinesse, his former deputy. He had previously offered him a place on his list, but Thinesse had refused because of the latter's "socialist" program, (Note: p. 223.) preferring to run as an "independent". In real terms, Léon Schwab's term as mayor was therefore limited to 3 years and 2 months, even though the street sign honoring him indicated that he was the town's mayor in his own right.

=== Active patriarch ===
He took part in the presentation of the second Croix de Guerre to the town of Épinal on September 24, 1950, (Note: The town had its premiere in 1921 to commemorate the sufferings of the First World War.) and in the inauguration of the Pinau statue on June 27, 1953. (Note: The present column was inaugurated on October 28, 1989.) He was also a dedicated and attentive administrator for 25 years of the Saint-Maurice hospital, located on the present site of the tax office.

He also continued his cultural activities, presiding from 1948 to 1955 over the Société d'émulation du département des Vosges, founded in 1925. (Note: p. 226.) He was also a member of the Association des amis du musée, founded in 1951. He also chaired the Office d'HLM from 1953 to 1959, which built 750 housing units.

Léon Schwab was also president of the Épinal district council.

=== Death ===
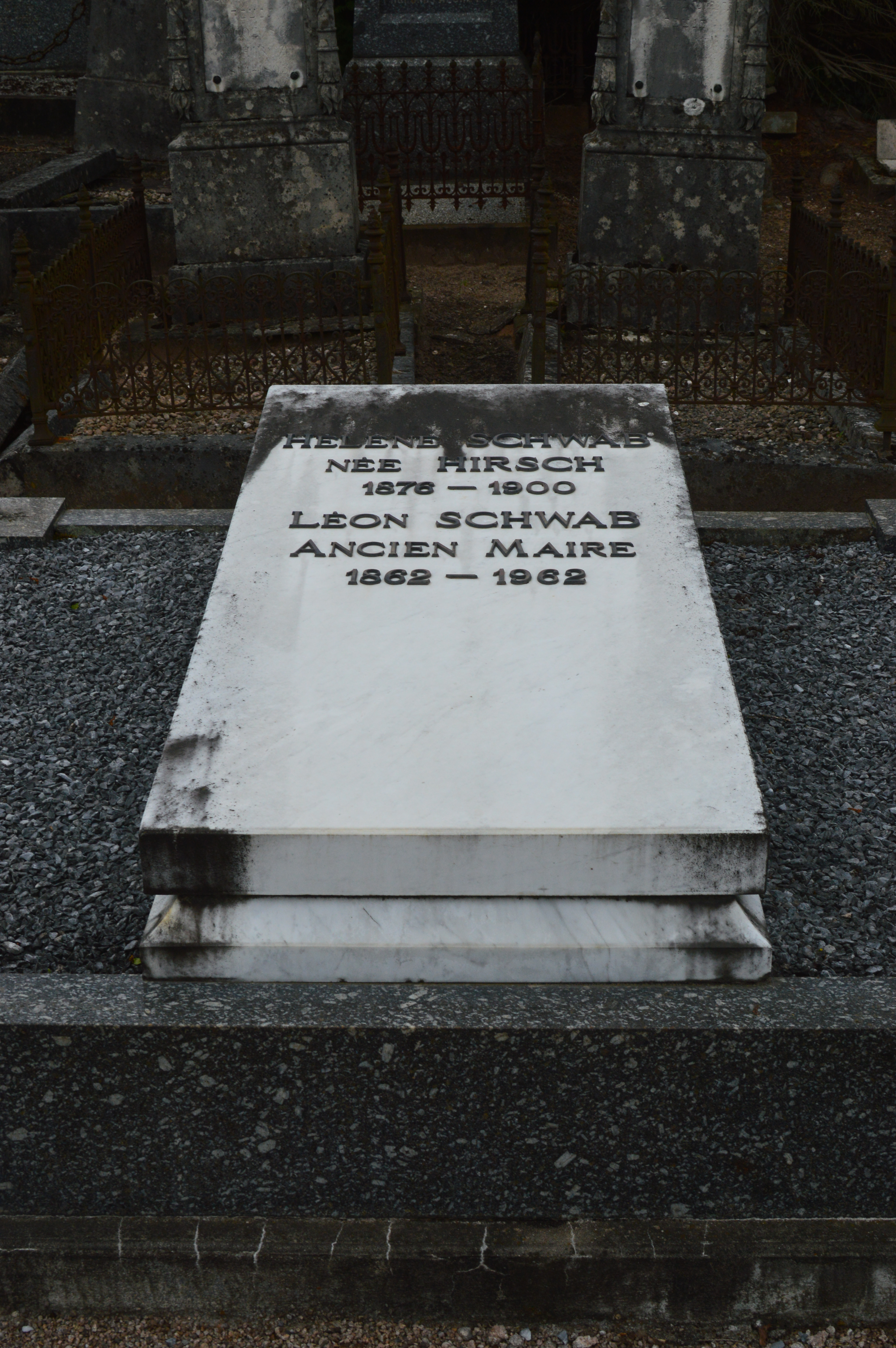
Léon Schwab's grave in Épinal's Saint-Michel cemetery.

He died in Épinal on Monday February 5, 1962, and was buried next to his wife Hélène in the Jewish cemetery the following day, in the presence of many prominent figures. The coffin was covered with the tricolor flag, on which was placed the four-gold braid kepi of the battalion commander of the 43rd Territorial Infantry Regiment. He had wanted a simple ceremony, so there were just two speeches, by Épinal mayor André Argant and Antoine Walter, president of the Vosges veterans' legion, followed by a minute's silence and a short prayer read by the officiating minister, Tinski. (Note: La Liberté de l'Est of February 9, 1962, published André Argant's farewell speech.)

== Tribute ==
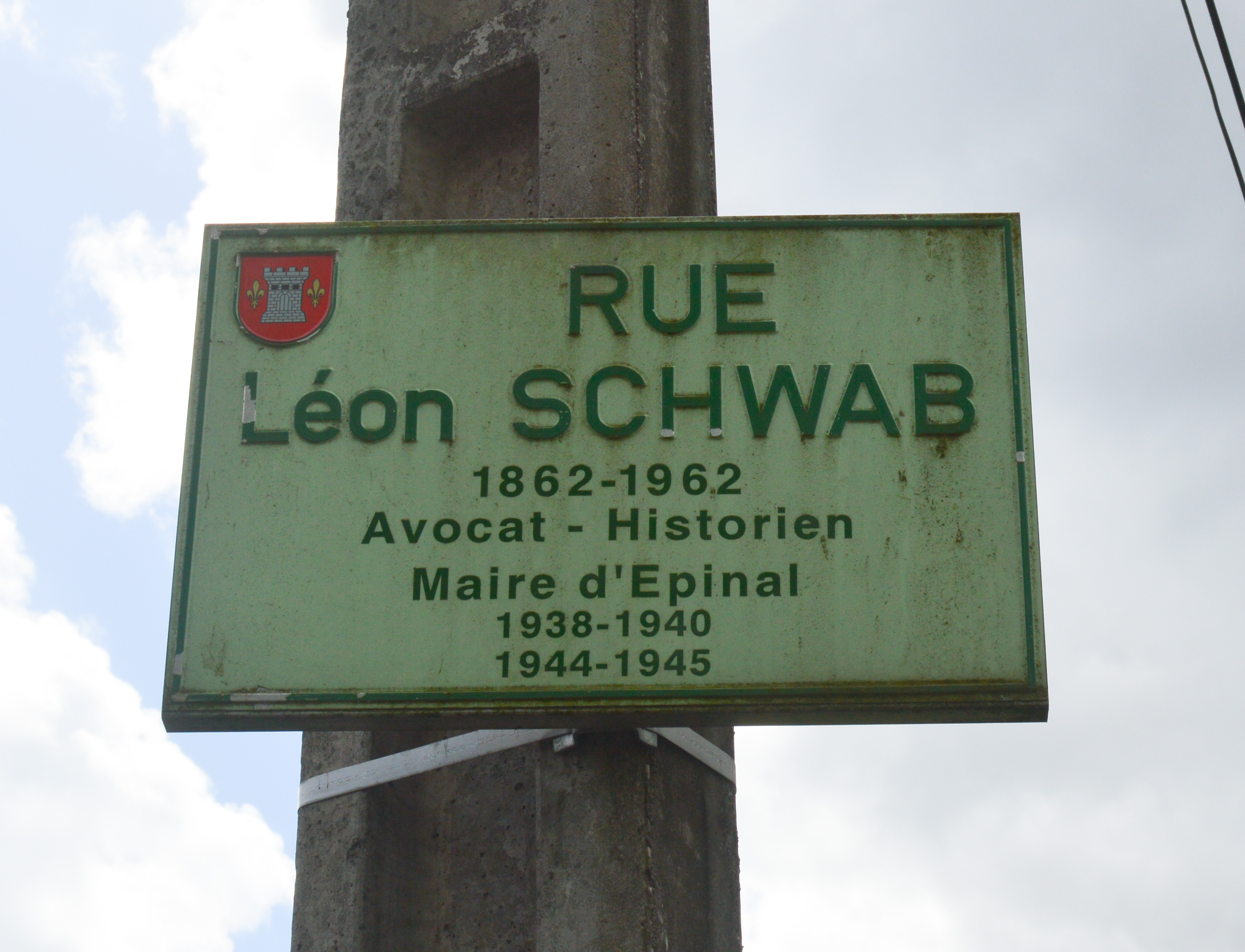
Léon Schwab street sign in Épinal (Vierge district).

A street in Épinal bears his name. He inaugurated it himself, a rare event, at the request of the town of Épinal, which was accepted by ministerial decision.

== Awards ==
- Commander's cross and tie of the Legion of Honor.
- Officer's Cross in the Order of Agricultural Merit.
- Insignia of Officer of Public Instruction.
- Médaille d'honneur départementale et communale d'argent.
- Commander's Cross and Tie of Social Merit.
- Croix de guerre 1914-1918 with palm. (Note: Léon Schwab was particularly fond of this award, created in April 1915 on the initiative of Maurice Barrès, and presented to him on the battlefield of La Fontenelle on July 24, 1915.)
- Veteran's Cross.
- Battle of the Marne Medal (Note: Léon Schwab took part in the Second Battle of the Marne in July–August.)

== See also ==
- Épinal

== Bibliography ==
- Ronsin, Albert (1990). " Léon Schwab ", in Les Vosgiens célèbres. Dictionnaire biographique illustré (in French). Vagney: Éditions Gérard Louis. ISBN 2-907016-09-1..
- Guéry, Gérald (2002). Épinal et Léon Schwab (1862-1962), Une ville, un homme, un siècle (in French). Épinal: Agi's. ISBN 2-9519154-0-3.
- Javelet, Robert (1972). Épinal, Images de mille ans d'Histoire (in French). Braun & Cie.
- d'Arbois de Jubainville, Paul (2003). Dictionnaire biographique lorrain (in French). La Serpenoise. p. 364..
