= Grand Ouest =

Area of western France

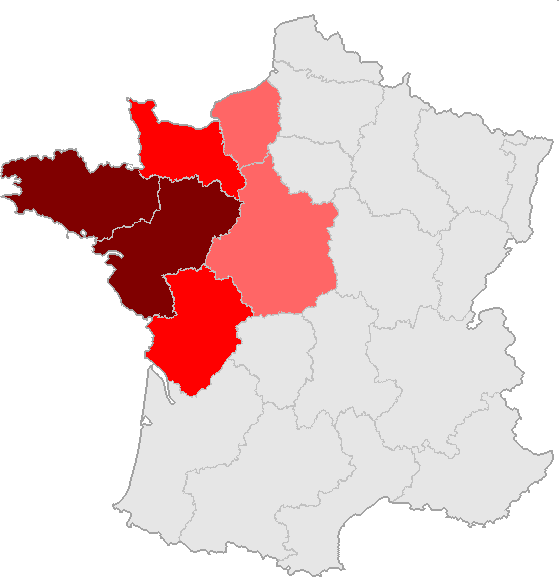
The Grand Ouest area according to various definitions

The Grand Ouest (Breton: Mervent Bras) is a geographical concept that can varyingly encompass a number of regions located in the western third or half of France, in the Atlantic Arc.

This territorial grouping is not formally defined and its many definitions are due in particular to the fact that it has never had its own political and administrative structure.

== Geographical limits ==
Not referring to any official subdivision or territorial authority, the Grand Ouest is an entity with variable definitions. It systematically includes Brittany and the Pays de la Loire, frequently the former Lower Normandy and Poitou-Charentes regions, and sometimes extends to the Centre-Val de Loire region and the former Upper Normandy region.

The territory is often the subject of projects and facilities shared by the different regions concerned (such as the Cancéropôle du Grand Ouest); sociological, political and economic areas of study; or technical and administrative areas (such as the tissue bank of the Établissement français du sang). However, in some cases, the term ‘Ouest’ is used to define this geographical area (for example, for the former European electoral constituency and INSEE's ZEAT Ouest). Its two largest cities, by any definition, are Nantes and Rennes.

== Various boundaries ==
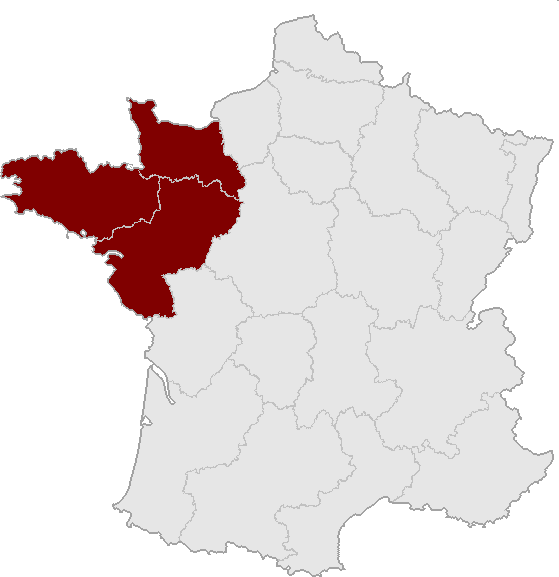
The Grand Ouest according to the circulation area of the daily newspaper Ouest-France and researchers from the University of Caen.

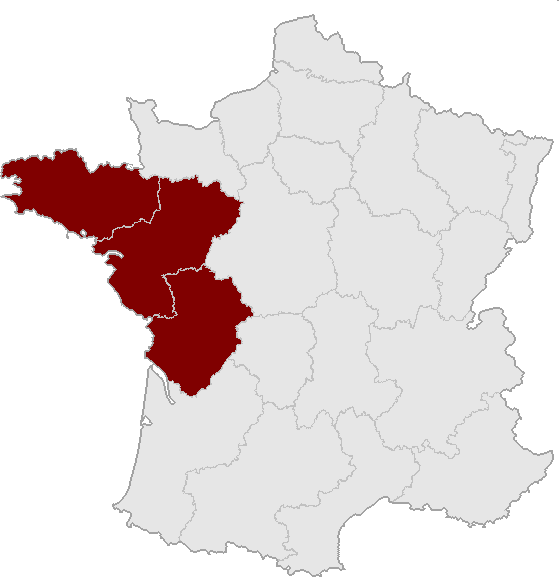
The former West France European electoral constituency and INSEE's ZEAT Ouest

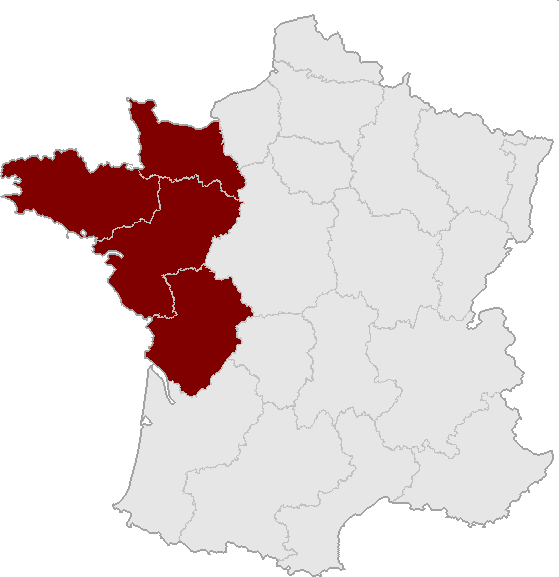
The Grand Ouest according to researcher Jean-Pierre Peyon.

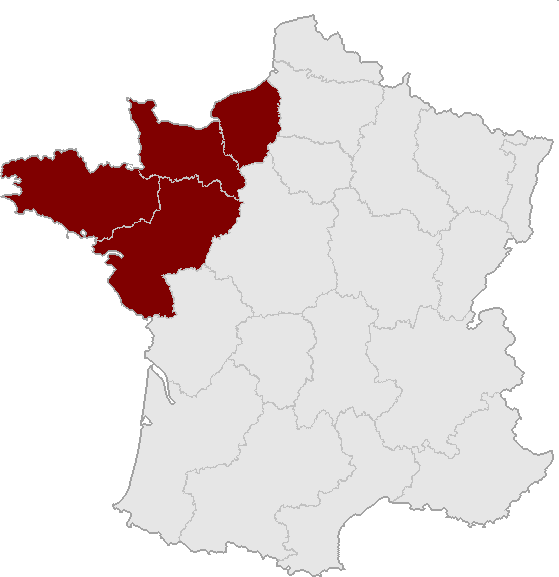
The Grand Ouest according to the inter-regional cooperation for local authority civil service competitions and the political scientist and geographer Michel Bussi.

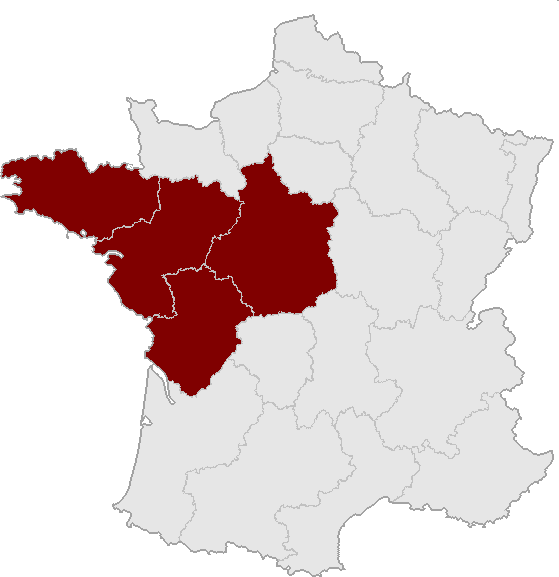
The Grand Ouest according to the Cancéropôle Grand Ouest and the Établissement français du sang (EFS).

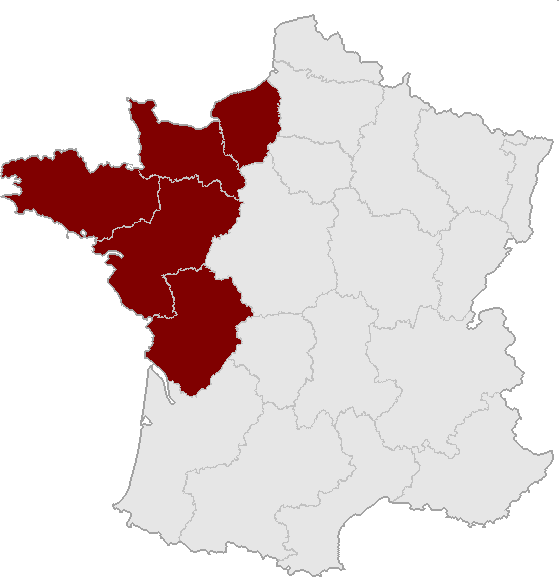
The Grand Ouest according to the Guides de voyage Ulysse.

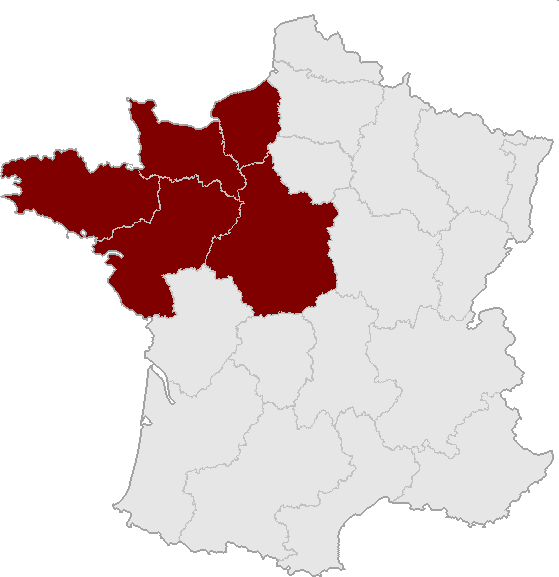
The Zone de Défense et Sécurité Ouest.

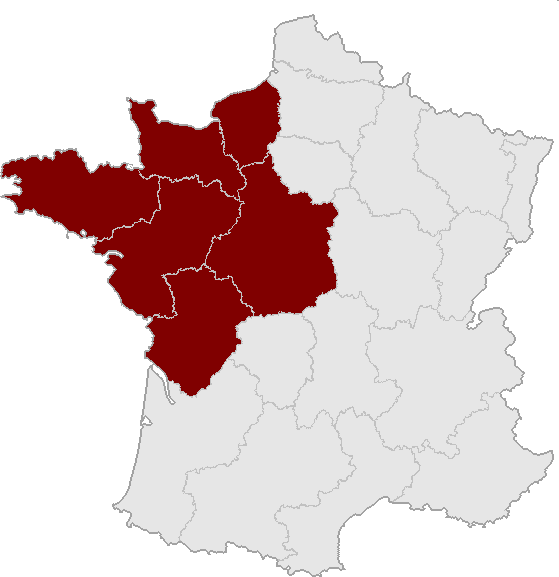
The Grand Ouest according to the Agence d'urbanisme de la région nantaise.
