= Isabelle Cogitore =

French historian

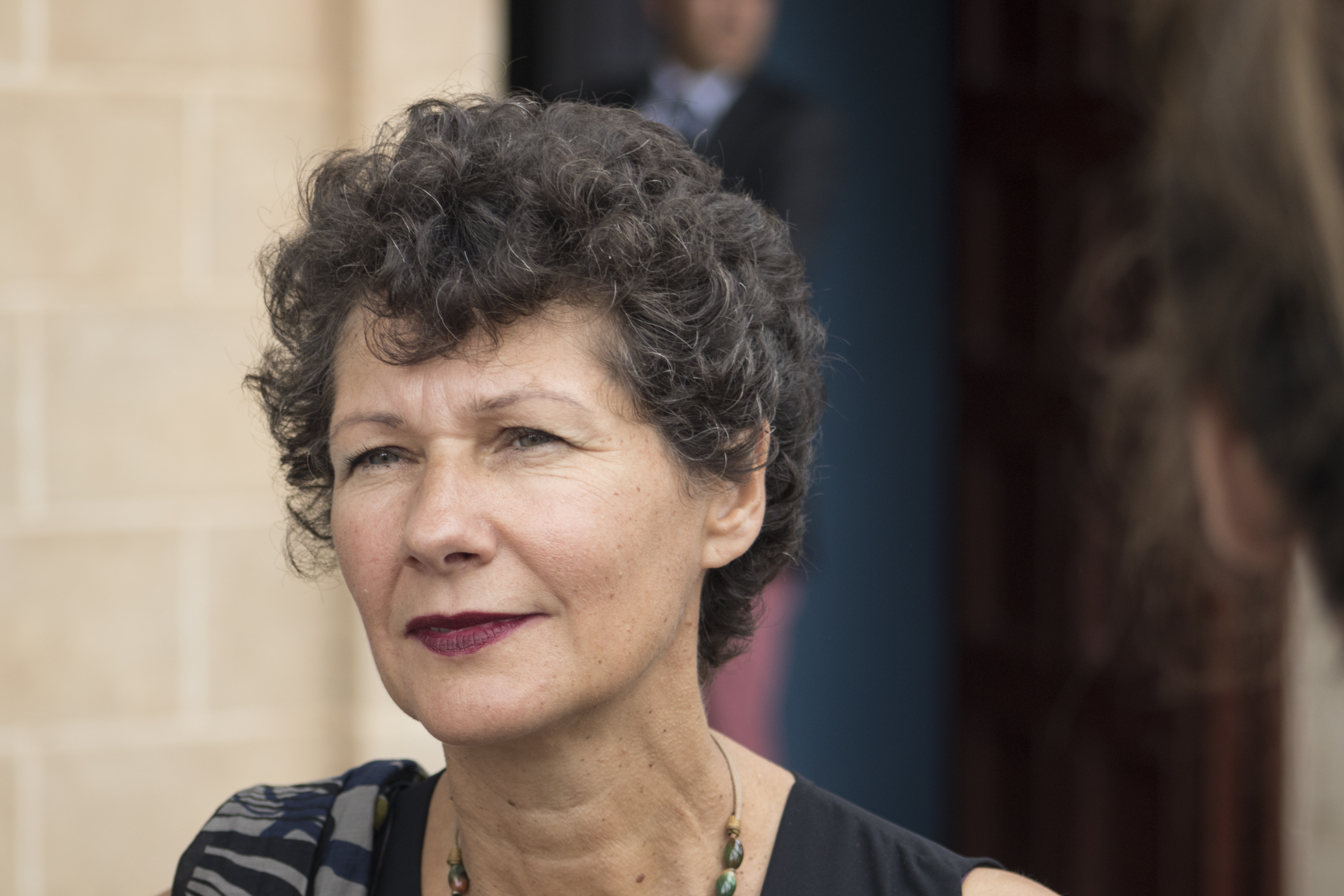
- Cogitore in 2018
- Born: July 29, 1964 (age 61); Épinal, Grand Est, France
- Occupations: Historian, professor

Isabelle Cogitore (born 29 July 1964) is a French historian, a specialist in ancient Rome, and professor of Latin language and literature at Stendhal University in Grenoble.

== Bibliography ==
Among her publications are:

- 2002: La légitimité dynastique d'Auguste à Néron à l'épreuve des conspirations, École française de Rome
- 2002: Translation of the biographie de l'empereur Claude, by Barbara Levick
- 2005: Translation by Paolo Fedeli, under the title Écologie antique; milieux et modes de vie dans le monde romain
- 2011: Le Doux Nom de liberté, éditions Ausonius
- 2001: under the direction of Isabelle Cogitore and Francis Goyet (2001). Devenir roi : essais sur la littérature adressée au prince. Grenoble: Ellug. p. 282. ISBN 2843100224.
- 2003: under the direction of Isabelle Cogitore and Francis Goyet (2003). L'éloge du prince : de l'Antiquité au temps des Lumières. Grenoble: Ellug. p. 392. ISBN 2843100445.
