= Municipal Organization Act of 1884 =

French law

The Loi du 5 avril 1884 sur l'organisation municipale (English: Law of 5 April 1884 on Municipal Organization) is a foundational law of the French Republic. It established the framework for the operation of French communes, marking a significant step toward decentralization in France.

== Background ==
France has historically been a centralized state, with centralization peaking during the First French Empire. Under the Third Republic, while still centralized, there was a push to clarify the organization of communes to complement an 1871 law that outlined the structure of departments. Republicans, notably Léon Gambetta, advocated for revitalizing municipal governance, a cause he championed in his 1869 Belleville speech.

In 1884, a bill was drafted to balance France's centralized system with greater autonomy for communes, aiming to make them the heart of local political life. The bill, proposed by Émile de Marcère, who was cautious about decentralization but supportive of local autonomy, was thoroughly debated in the Senate, where local government representation played a key role.

== Provisions ==
=== Municipal institutional structure ===
The 1884 law established a uniform legal framework for all French communes, modeled on the departmental structure. It defined the roles of local public actors, centering on a deliberative body (the municipal council), responsible for passing resolutions, and an executive body (the mayor), tasked with preparing and implementing these resolutions. The mayor was given a dual role as both a representative of the commune and an agent of the state.

=== Electoral system ===
The law introduced universal suffrage for electing municipal councils, with councilors serving four-year terms (extended to six years in 1929). The mayor is elected by the municipal council, acting as the commune’s representative.

Article 74 of the law stipulates that the roles of mayor, deputy mayor, and municipal councilor are unpaid, though expenses incurred during special mandates may be reimbursed. Municipal councils may allocate funds from ordinary communal resources for mayoral representation expenses.

=== Local self-governance ===
The 1884 law is notable for establishing the principle of local self-governance for territorial entities. Article 61, paragraph 1 states: "The municipal council regulates the affairs of the commune through its deliberations." This granted communes a general competence clause, significantly expanding their previous powers.

=== State-Commune relations ===
Despite the principle of self-governance, the law maintained state oversight through the prefect, who supervised the mayor and communal acts. However, in a republican spirit, it reduced state control over municipal councils, introducing safeguards against the executive’s ability to dismiss mayors (Article 86) and limiting the dissolution of municipal councils (Articles 43–45).

== Legacy ==
The 1884 municipal law, often referred to as the "great republican charter of communes," was a pivotal step toward decentralization. Codified in the Code des communes, it remained in effect until the Loi du 2 mars 1982, which marked France’s first comprehensive decentralization reform.

== See also ==
- Prefect (France)
- Municipal council (France)
- Administrative divisions of France
- Local government in France
