= Basilica of Saint Maurice (Épinal) =

Basilica in Épinal, France

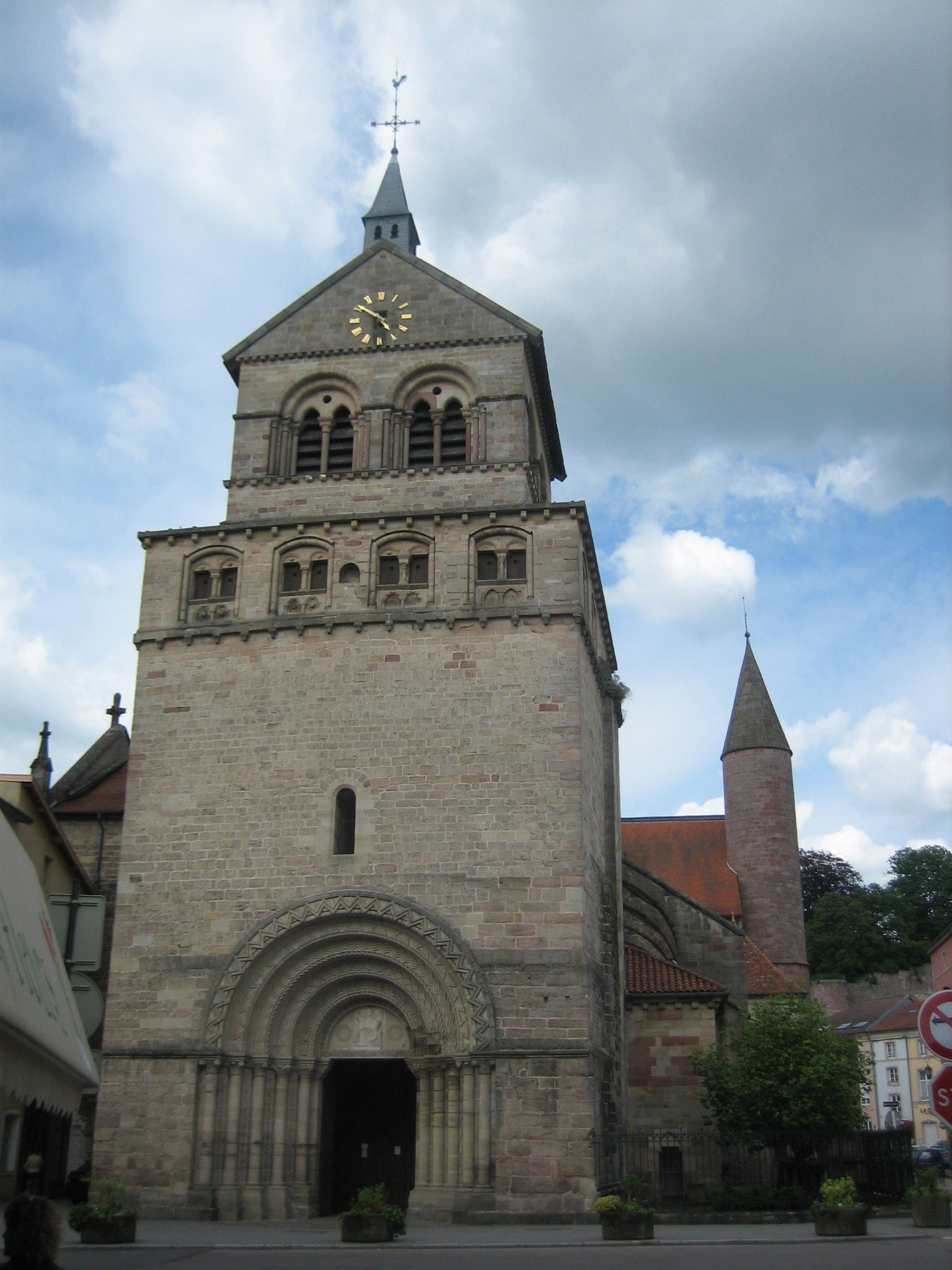

- Location within Grand Est Location within Lorraine Location within France

Religion
- Affiliation: Catholic
- Province: Lorraine
- Region: Vosges
- Patron: Saint Maurice

Location
- Country: France
- Interactive map of Basilica of Saint Maurice
- Administration: Grand Est
- Coordinates: 48.1742°N 6.4509°E

Architecture
- Style: Romanesque and Gothic architecture

The Basilica of Saint Maurice of Épinal is a Catholic basilica located in the French commune of Épinal.

It is a religious building constructed, in its current state, between the 11th and 13th centuries. It is part of the Diocese of Saint-Dié.

== History ==
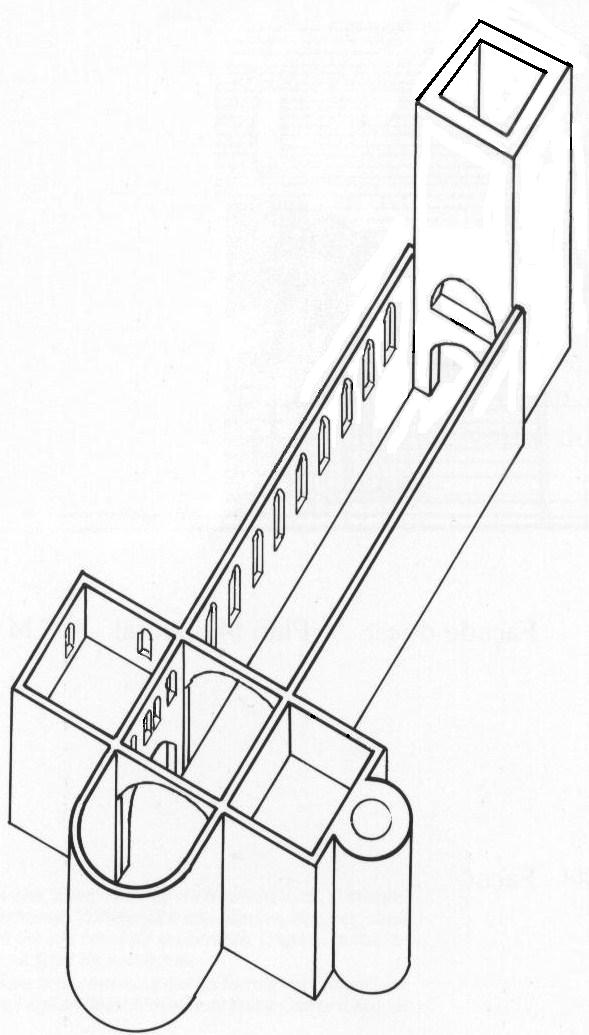
Plan of the basilica at its consecration in 1050 by Pope Leo IX (reconstruction).

In the Middle Ages, the lands were under the jurisdiction of the Lord of Metz; ecclesiastically, they were under the Diocese of Toul, part of the parish of Dogneville. The basilica is believed to stand on the site of the city's first church, built in the 10th century by Bishop Gerard of Toul at the request of Thierry de Hamelant, Bishop of Metz. The parish was formed from five manses taken from the parish of Dogneville: Spinal, Grennevo, Avrinsart, Villers, and Rualménil. Thierry de Hamelant, in founding the monastery, dedicated the church to Saint Maurice, serving both the city's population and the Benedictine monks. To complete the foundation, the two bishops relocated, with Thierry de Hamelant bringing the relics of Saint Goeric, an event purportedly accompanied by a miracle recorded by Widric. South of the nave was the cloister, while to the south of the choir, the first cemetery of Épinal was associated, located on the current Place de l'Âtre, as indicated by a crucifix affixed to the wall of the southern arm of the transept. The subsequent bishop, Adalbero II, finding the monastery deserted, decided to establish Benedictine nuns there under the patronage of Saint Goëry, one of his predecessors in the episcopal see of Metz.

== Protection ==
The Saint-Maurice Church is classified as a historical monument under the 1846 list.

== Bibliography ==
- Tronquart, Martine (1989). Saint-Maurice d'Épinal, une église dans la ville (in French). Vagney: édition Gérard Louis. ISBN 2-907016-08-3.
- Tronquart, Martine (1996). Épinal: basilique Saint-Maurice. Itinéraires du patrimoine (in French). Nancy: éditions Serpenoise. ISBN 2-87692-293-2.
