= Hôtel de Ville, Épinal =

Town hall in Épinal, France

Hôtel de Ville
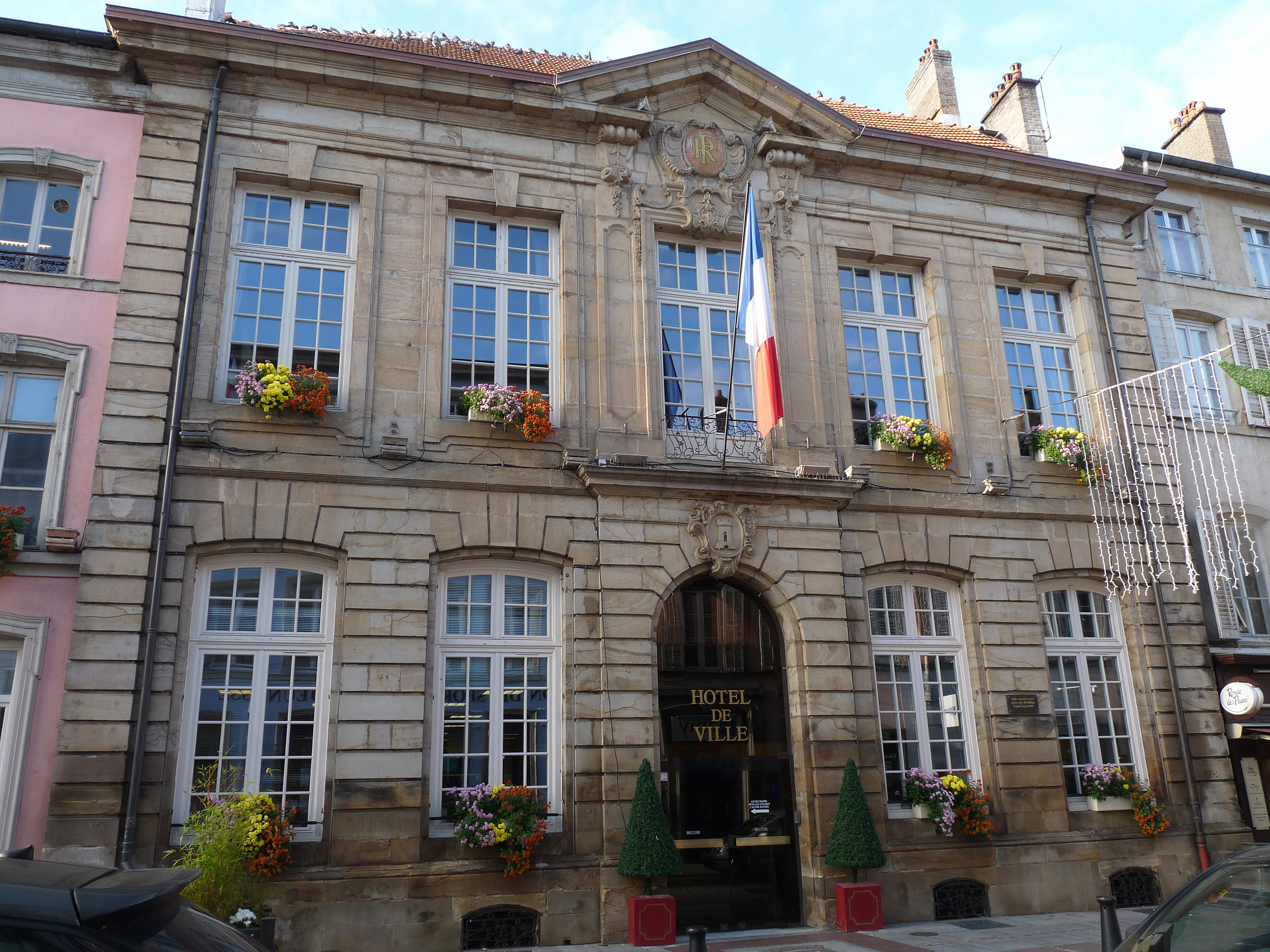
- The main frontage of the Hôtel de Ville in November 2011
- Interactive map of the Hôtel de Ville area

General information
- Type: City hall
- Architectural style: Neoclassical style
- Location: Épinal, France
- Coordinates: 48.1754°N 6.4504°E
- Completed: 1757

The Hôtel de Ville (French pronunciation: [otɛl də vil], City Hall) is a municipal building in Épinal, Vosges, in eastern France, standing on Rue du Général-Leclerc.

== History ==
The first town hall in Épinal, which was on what is now Rue Chopin with its entrance facing onto Place du Poiron (now Place des Vosges), was completed in the 16th century.

In the early 1730s, the bailiff and the Jesuits decided to exchange buildings so that the bailiff, who had been based in the old town hall, relocated to Maison Migeaine at No. 11 Grande Rue (now Rue du Général-Leclerc), while the Jesuits, who needed extra space, moved to the old town hall, which they then demolished to build their new premises. Maison Migeaine had been named after Monsieur de la Migeaine, who had served as commissioner for war in Phalsbourg. The exchange was approved by Francis, Duke of Lorraine in 1734.

In the mid-18th century, the bailiff decided to demolish Maison Migeaine and to erect a new building on the same site. The new building was designed in the neoclassical style, built ashlar stone and was completed in 1757. The design involved a symmetrical main frontage of five bays facing onto the street. The ground floor was rusticated. The central bay, which was slightly projected forward, featured a round headed doorway with voussoirs and a keystone bearing an oval panel depicting a castle. There was a French door with an iron railing on the first floor and an oval panel with the inscription "RF" (République Française) above the door. The French door was flanked by Ionic order pilasters surmounted by scrolls supporting a pediment. The other bays were fenestrated by segmental headed windows with keystones on the ground floor and by square headed windows with keystones on the first floor. Internally, the principal room was the Grand Salon, which also served as the council chamber. In 1896, the artist, Louis Guingot, was employed to decorate the entrance hall, the staircase and the Grand Salon.

Then, in 1916, the council decided to acquire the adjacent building, Maison Wolfensperger, at No. 9 Grande Rue (now Rue du Général-Leclerc), for use as administrative centre. Maison Wolfensperger had been named after Sieur Wolfensperger, who had been a fabric merchant. The two buildings were then brought together and refurbished to a design by Louis-Ernest Mougenot-Méline.

General Charles de Gaulle visited the town hall and delivered an important speech about the proposed constitution for the French Fourth Republic in the Grand Salon on 29 September 1946. Then, on 12 October 1981, the newly-elected president of France, François Mitterrand, gave a speech in the same room.
