= Léo Valentin =

French aviation pioneer (1919–1956)

Valentin on 28 May 1955

Léon Alfred Nicolas Valentin (22 March 1919, Épinal (Vosges), France – 21 May 1956, Liverpool, England) was a French paratrooper, inventor, and daredevil who attempted to achieve human flight using bird-like wings. Léo Valentin is widely considered to be the most famous "birdman" of all time. He was billed as "Valentin, the Most Daring Man in the World". His death was infamous, as he fell from a plane while performing a stunt at an air show and was killed on impact. The tragedy drew wide attention and became a defining part of his legacy.

== Biography ==
=== Early involvement in parachuting ===
Léo Valentin was born in 1919 in Épinal (Vosges), France. He always had a keen interest in airplanes, and read avidly about powered aircraft and gliders. His ultimate dream was to be able to fly like the birds. At the outbreak of World War II, he planned to become a fighter pilot, but opted to train as a paratrooper. At age 19, he joined a group of French paratroopers in Baraki, Algeria.

After the outbreak of World War II and the fall of France, he became an instructor with the rank of sergeant at a parachute school in Fez, Morocco. He then sailed to England for retraining, parachuted into Brittany as a saboteur and was wounded in the arm in a firefight at Loire.

After the war, Valentin again served as a parachute instructor and directed his attention toward his lifelong ambition. While still in the French Army, he developed the jumping technique known as the "Valentin position", allowing him better control of his movements in the air. In February 1948, he set a record for the longest free fall without a respirator (15,600 feet (4,800 m)). He subsequently made another free fall of 20,200 feet (6,200 m) and set a record for the longest night free fall (14,550 feet (4,430 m)). Shortly thereafter, he left the army after ten years of service to continue his experiments as a civilian.

=== Birdman: from concept to practice ===
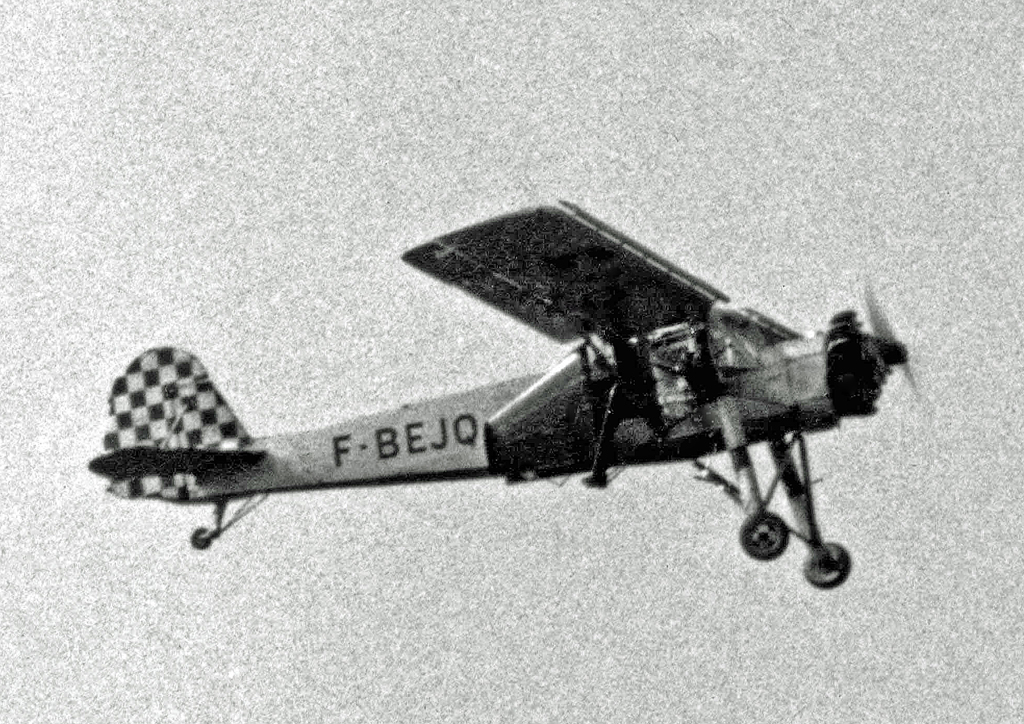
Leo Valentin taking off strapped to the outside of a Morane-Saulnier MS.502 Criquet in May 1955. He faces backward and his wooden wings are fitted to the side of the aircraft.

At Villacoublay airfield, near Paris, Valentin attempted his first "wing jump" using wings made of canvas, but he failed to achieve any forward speed. He then tried rigid wings to prevent the wings from collapsing. On 13 May 1954, with the help of a set of rigid wooden wings, he finally managed some kind of stability with the initial spiral. Valentin later claimed that he managed to fly for three miles using his wooden wings.

=== Death ===
On 21 May 1956, Valentin was at a Whit Monday air show in Liverpool, performing a stunt in front of 100,000 spectators (including Beatles Paul McCartney and George Harrison, as well as three-year-old Clive Barker, who would later reference Valentin in his work). He was using wings similar to the wooden ones that had brought him success in the past, but longer and more aerodynamic. However, the stunt immediately went wrong. When exiting the plane, one of Valentin's wings made contact and a piece broke away. He attempted to land safely using a parachute, but that also failed, and he died immediately upon hitting the ground.

Valentin's body arrived by plane at the airbase Luxeuil-St-Sauveur (BA 116), where he was received with military honors. Placed on a command car of the French Air Force and covered with flowers, his body arrived at the church of Saint-Sauveur, Haute-Saône, on 3 June 1956.

== See also ==
- Wingsuit flying

== Bibliography ==
- Perrin, Claude (2006). Léo Valentin (1919-1956) - Les hommes volants, un précurseur [Léo Valentin (1919-1956) - The flying men, a precursor]. Nouvelles Éditions Latines. ISBN 2-7233-2067-7.
