= Épinal =

- Prefecture and commune
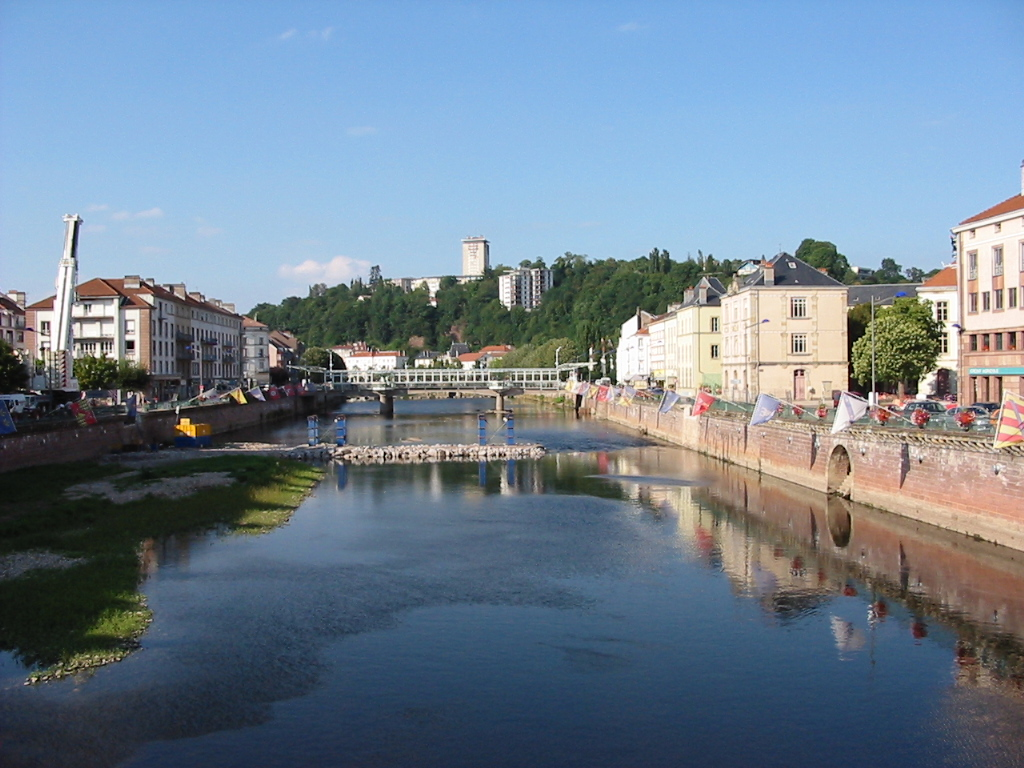
- The river Moselle

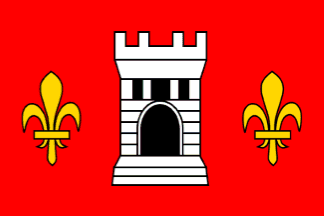
- Flag Coat of arms
- Location of Épinal
- Location within France Location within Grand Est
- Coordinates: 48°10′28″N 6°27′04″E
- Country: France
- Region: Grand Est
- Department: Vosges
- Arrondissement: Épinal
- Canton: Épinal-1 and 2
- Intercommunality: CA Épinal

Government
  - Mayor (2020–2026): Patrick Nardin
- Area^{1}: 59.24 km^{2} (22.87 sq mi)
  - Urban: 161.3 km^{2} (62.3 sq mi)
  - Metro: 1,288 km^{2} (497 sq mi)
- Elevation: 340 m (1,120 ft)
- Highest elevation: 492 m (1,614 ft)
- Lowest elevation: 315 m (1,033 ft)
- Population (2023): 32,251
  - Density: 544.4/km^{2} (1,410/sq mi)
  - Urban (2022): 61,743
  - Urban density: 382.8/km^{2} (991.4/sq mi)
  - Metro (2022): 118,915
  - Metro density: 92.33/km^{2} (239.1/sq mi)
- Time zone: UTC+01:00 (CET)
  - Summer (DST): UTC+02:00 (CEST)
- INSEE/Postal code: 88160 /88000
- Website: epinal.fr
- ^{1} French Land Register data, which excludes lakes, ponds, glaciers > 1 km^{2} (0.386 sq mi or 247 acres) and river estuaries.

Épinal (French pronunciation: [epinal]; German: Spinneln; Latin: Spinalium) is a commune in northeastern France and the prefecture of the Vosges department.

== Geography ==
The commune has a land area of 59.24 square kilometres (22.87 sq mi). It is situated on the river Moselle, 60 kilometres (37 miles) south of Nancy. Épinal station has rail connections to Paris, Remiremont, Strasbourg, Belfort and Nancy.

== History ==
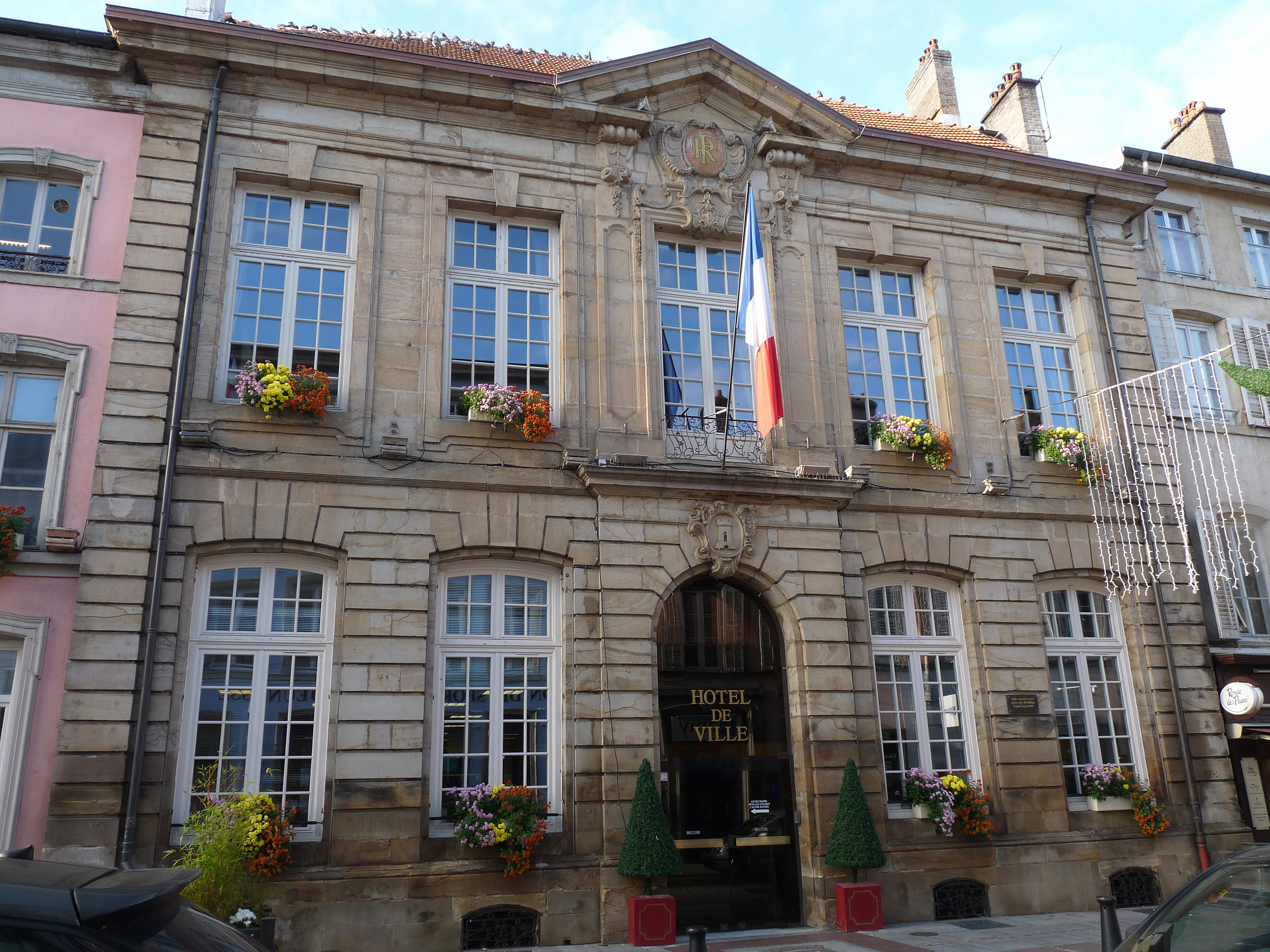
The Hôtel de Ville

The mythical founding date of Épinal is said to be 983 since celebrations took place for the "Millennium" in June 1983. This date was chosen for political reasons to mark a "starting point" following the election of Philippe Séguin as mayor in March 1983.

In 1444, the town of Épinal was still part of the domain of the bishops of Metz. In September, representatives of the town took advantage of King Charles VII's passage through Nancy to offer him the submission of the town and to ask for his protection in return. The act of submission of Épinal is dated September 7, 1444. The king promised never to alienate the city; however, Louis XI handed over the town to the Marshal of Burgundy in 1465. Eventually, Épinal came under the guardianship of the Duke of Lorraine.

The Hôtel de Ville was completed in 1757.

In 1790, the Constituent Assembly requested the departmental assembly of Vosges to choose between Mirecourt and Épinal as the capital of the department. The departmental assembly convened in Épinal on June 1 and, with three hundred and eleven votes against one hundred and twenty-seven, chose the city of Épinal. Mirecourt became a sub-prefecture.

During World War II, in January 1944, the Stalag 315 prisoner-of-war camp was relocated from the German-occupied Netherlands to Épinal, and it housed Indian POWs. At least 40 POWs were killed and 80 were wounded after the camp was hit during a bombing of the town on 11 May 1944.

Many of the prisoners took advantage of the chaos to escape. Once free, most of them began marching south towards the region of Porrentruy, the first town in Swiss territory, some 100 kilometers away. By the end of June 1944, the Swiss authorities had recorded the entry into Swiss territory of 500 former prisoners from the Epinal camp. This was the largest escape of prisoners of war during the Second World War. This episode is recounted in the book 'The Great Epinal Escape' by British historian Ghee Bowman.

== Population ==
In 2022, 32,296 people lived in the town proper, while its functional area had a population of 118,915.

Historical population

Year	Pop.	±% p.a.
1793	6,688	—
1800	7,321	+1.30%
1806	7,905	+1.29%
1821	7,941	+0.03%
1831	9,070	+1.34%
1836	9,526	+0.99%
1841	10,012	+1.00%
1846	11,485	+2.78%
1856	11,076	−0.36%
1861	11,957	+1.54%
1866	11,870	−0.15%
1872	11,847	−0.03%
1876	14,894	+5.89%
1881	16,445	+2.00%
1886	20,932	+4.94%
1891	23,223	+2.10%
1896	26,525	+2.69%
1901	28,080	+1.15%

Year	Pop.	±% p.a.
1906	29,058	+0.69%
1911	30,042	+0.67%
1921	28,352	−0.58%
1926	26,849	−1.08%
1931	27,350	+0.37%
1936	27,708	+0.26%
1946	23,395	−1.68%
1954	28,688	+2.58%
1962	30,313	+0.69%
1968	36,856	+3.31%
1975	39,604	+1.03%
1982	37,818	−0.66%
1990	36,732	−0.36%
1999	35,794	−0.29%
2007	33,528	−0.81%
2012	32,387	−0.69%
2017	31,740	−0.40%
2023	32,251	+0.27%

Source: EHESS and INSEE (1968–2023)

== Main sights ==
The old town centre features the Place des Vosges, the Chapitre district, Saint-Maurice's Basilica, medieval castle remains and the Roman House (11th and 13th centuries). It is also known for its parks and gardens, as well as a large communal forest with arboretum (the Arboretum de la Forêt d'Épinal).

There are major fortifications, extended and maintained until the early 20th century. There is a legend, among the populace of Épinal, that Napoleon's ghost strolls the wall ramparts on 9 September of each year at 05:00. It was on this day and at this time that, in 1811, Napoleon gave his first and last oration to the city of Épinal, wherein he addressed the challenges posed by northern expansion.

The Epinal American Cemetery and Memorial on the outskirts of the town where United States service members killed in World War II are buried.

== Notable residents ==
- Isabelle Cogitore (born 1964), historian
- Michel Béroff (born 1950), pianist and conductor
- Jean-Baptiste Jacopin (1755–1811), general of the armies of the 1st Republic and the First French Empire.
- Victor Magnien (1802–1885), violinist, guitarist and composer
- Émile Durkheim (1858–1917), founder of sociology
- Louis Lapicque (1866–1952), physiologist, specialist of the nervous system and known for his discovery of the chronaxie.
- Marcel Mauss (1872–1950), father of French modern ethnography and nephew of Émile Durkheim.
- Marc Boegner (1881–1970), writer, thinker and pastor, president of the Fédération protestante de France and the World Council of Churches, a member of the Académie française.
- Henry Daniel-Rops (1901–1965), writer and historian
- Jean-Marie Cavada (1940) journalist and politician.
- Léo Valentin (1919–1956), French soldier and adventurer, nicknamed "l'homme-oiseau".
- Léon Schwab (1862-1962), French cloth merchant, lawyer and politician.
- Marceline Loridan-Ivens (1928), film director
- Philippe Séguin (1943–2010), Mayor of Épinal, French politician, President of the Court of Auditors under the Fifth Republic.
- Ségolène Royal (1953), completed her high school in Charmes, before joining the Lycée Saint-Joseph of Épinal in 1968.
- Laetitia Masson (1966), screenwriter and film director
- Valérie Donzelli (1973), actress and film director
- Jeanne Cressanges, novelist, essayist
- Nicolas Matthieu (1978), writer, winner of the Prix Erckmann-Chatrian in 2014, winner of the Prix Goncourt in 2018
- Maria Pourchet (1980), writer, winner of the Prix Erckmann-Chatrian in 2013.
- Marie-Antoinette Gout, Righteous Among the Nations

=== Sportspeople ===
- Romain Febvre (1991), 2015 Motocross World Champion
- Grégory Gaultier (1982), 2015 Squash World Champion
- Pierre Thiriet (1989), racing driver
- Maxime Mermoz (1986), rugby player
- Julien Bontemps (1979), windsurfer
- Gauthier Klauss (1987), canoeist
- Matthieu Péché (1987), canoeist
- Aurore Mongel (1982), swimmer
- Damien Nazon (1974), rider
- Jean-Patrick Nazon (1977), rider
- Nacer Bouhanni (1990), rider
- Rayane Bouhanni (1996), brother of the former, also a rider
- Antoine Leclerc (1981), racing driver

== Economy ==
Épinal is best known for the "Images d'Épinal" – which is now a common expression in French language – the popular prints created by a local company, the Imagerie d'Épinal, formerly known as the Imagerie Pellerin. These stencil-colored woodcuts of military subjects, Napoleonic history, storybook characters and other folk themes were widely distributed throughout the 19th century. The company still exists today, and still uses its hand-operated presses to produce the antique images. Other local industries include textiles, metals, morocco leather, precision instruments, and bicycles. There is a school of textile weaving.

== Politics ==
Épinal is contained within Vosges' 1st constituency for elections to the National Assembly.

== Education ==
The engineering College École nationale supérieure des technologies et industries du bois dedicated to wood Industry is located in the city.

== Sport ==
The commune is home to SAS Épinal, which play in the Championnat National 1, the fourth-tier of football in France. There is also a hockey team, Wildcats d'Épinal, which currently plays in the FFHG Division 1, the second tier of ice hockey.

== International relations ==
Épinal is twinned with:

- Bitola, North Macedonia
- Chieri, Italy
- Gembloux, Belgium
- La Crosse, United States
- Loughborough, England, United Kingdom
- Nový Jičín, Czech Republic
- Schwäbisch Hall, Germany

== Climate ==
Climate data for Épinal, elevation 317 m (1,040 ft), (1991–2020 normals, extremes 1986–present)
Month	Jan	Feb	Mar	Apr	May	Jun	Jul	Aug	Sep	Oct	Nov	Dec	Year
Record high °C (°F)	17.4 (63.3)	20.6 (69.1)	24.5 (76.1)	27.6 (81.7)	31.0 (87.8)	36.8 (98.2)	39.3 (102.7)	38.0 (100.4)	32.8 (91.0)	27.9 (82.2)	23.1 (73.6)	17.8 (64.0)	39.3 (102.7)
Mean daily maximum °C (°F)	4.9 (40.8)	6.6 (43.9)	11.1 (52.0)	15.3 (59.5)	19.2 (66.6)	22.9 (73.2)	25.1 (77.2)	24.9 (76.8)	20.3 (68.5)	15.2 (59.4)	9.2 (48.6)	5.7 (42.3)	15.0 (59.0)
Daily mean °C (°F)	2.0 (35.6)	2.9 (37.2)	6.2 (43.2)	9.5 (49.1)	13.5 (56.3)	17.1 (62.8)	19.1 (66.4)	18.9 (66.0)	14.8 (58.6)	10.8 (51.4)	5.9 (42.6)	3.0 (37.4)	10.3 (50.5)
Mean daily minimum °C (°F)	−0.9 (30.4)	−0.8 (30.6)	1.2 (34.2)	3.7 (38.7)	7.8 (46.0)	11.3 (52.3)	13.2 (55.8)	12.9 (55.2)	9.3 (48.7)	6.5 (43.7)	2.7 (36.9)	0.2 (32.4)	5.6 (42.1)
Record low °C (°F)	−18.9 (−2.0)	−17.1 (1.2)	−17.8 (0.0)	−7.5 (18.5)	−1.6 (29.1)	0.9 (33.6)	4.4 (39.9)	2.6 (36.7)	−0.6 (30.9)	−6.7 (19.9)	−13.6 (7.5)	−18.8 (−1.8)	−18.9 (−2.0)
Average precipitation mm (inches)	76.7 (3.02)	65.0 (2.56)	67.1 (2.64)	61.8 (2.43)	82.1 (3.23)	73.1 (2.88)	71.5 (2.81)	72.6 (2.86)	77.1 (3.04)	88.8 (3.50)	83.1 (3.27)	88.1 (3.47)	907.0 (35.71)
Average precipitation days (≥ 1.0 mm)	12.3	10.8	10.7	9.8	11.8	10.6	10.7	10.1	9.4	11.7	12.2	13.4	133.5
Mean monthly sunshine hours	62.6	86.5	142.5	177.5	206.5	225.1	237.7	220.5	170.5	112.8	63.9	53.8	1,759.8
Source: Meteociel

== See also ==
- Communes of the Vosges department
