= Municipal council (France) =

Elected body of a commune

In France, a municipal council (French: conseil municipal, pronounced [kɔ̃sɛj mynisipal]) is an elected body of the commune responsible for "executing, in its deliberations, the business of the town" (translated).

The council must meet at least once a quarter, or at a request from at least one third of its members, but usually meets once a month. The council manages the smallest French territorial community with legal and financial autonomy, the commune.

Participation in the Municipal council vote as a candidate or as an elector is a privilege given only to European citizens. The British choice and decision to leave the European Union on 1 February 2020 had the consequence that 800 elected conseillers municipaux of British nationality were no longer eligible to be re-elected on 15 March 2020.

== Composition ==
The number of seats in the municipal council depends on the number of inhabitants. This number is set by law: 7 seats for municipalities with less than 100 inhabitants to 69 seats for those with more than 300,000 inhabitants.

The number of councilors depends on the size of the city. The decree of 27 January 1977 gives that number based on segments of the population of the municipality of 9 members for smaller municipalities up to 49 more cities 300,000 inhabitants.

The law of November 1982, which is part of a package of reforms being made by the Law of 31 December 1982 relating to the administrative organization of Paris, Marseille, Lyon and public establishments for cooperation (PLM Act) on the specific case of the three biggest cities of France, changed the composition of municipal councils, maintaining the same segments of the population, from 9 to 49 members.

Finally, the Act of 17 May 2013 has been lowered from 9 to 7 the number of councilors in smaller communities with less than 100 inhabitants:

Number of municipal councilors by demographic slice (effective for municipalities in 2014)
Number of inhabitants	< 100	< 500	< 1500	< 2500	< 3500	< 5000	< 10,000	< 20,000	< 30,000	< 40,000
Number of councilors	7	11	15	19	23	27	29	33	35	39
Number of inhabitants	< 50,000	< 60,000	< 80,000	< 100,000	< 150,000	< 200,000	< 250,000	< 300,000	≥ 300,000	
Number of councilors	43	45	49	53	55	59	61	65	69	

For Paris, Lyon and Marseille, the number of councilors which should not be confused with the borough or sector' councilors which are more numerous but have limited powers, is determined by the PLM Act :

Number of councilors in the three major cities' arrondissements
Ville	Lyon	Marseille	Paris
Number of municipal councilors	73 municipal councilors	101 municipal councilors	163 councilors of Paris

Councilors are elected by direct universal suffrage for a term of six years, and can be reelected. The vote takes place following the French election procedures.

== Election ==
The electoral system differs depending on the size of the municipality. (Note: The rules for the election of members of the Council can be found in the French electoral code) The term of elected officials is six years. There are no term limits for city councilors.

In 2013, the law distinguished between the municipalities of less than 3500 inhabitants and those larger, the first electing their municipal councilors using a two-round system, the second using proportional representation in two rounds. In municipalities with less than 3500 inhabitants, municipal councilors are elected by majority vote in two rounds, and in the municipalities of less than 2500 inhabitants, the candidate does not have to be registered to be elected.

Beginning with the elections of 2014, the threshold of 3500 inhabitants was reduced to 1000 inhabitants to facilitate the parity between men and women in elected office: Now, plurality-at-large voting is only used in communes with a population less than 1000 inhabitants. For communes with more than 1000 inhabitants, proportional representation is used. In addition, candidates who registered their candidacy with the prefecture or sub-prefecture can be elected, whatever the size of the municipality.

=== Communes under 1000 inhabitants ===
The election of municipal councilors uses a plurality-at-large voting in two rounds, with panachage:

- In the first round, candidates are elected if they receive an absolute majority of votes cast and the vote of at least a quarter of registered voters;
- In second round, a simple majority suffices. If two or more candidates receive the same number of votes, the election is won by the oldest candidates if the election can not be decided on the number of seats won.

A candidate must registry with the prefecture or sub-prefecture to be elected. Candidates not on a list and incomplete lists are allowed, but can not be elected if they have not previously applied for candidacy. The votes are recorded individually, and panachage is allowed: Voters have the right to change the ballot by selecting candidates from various lists.

=== Communes with 1000 or more inhabitants ===
The council members are elected using proportional representation with two rounds, with the winning list getting additional seats. The winning list (absolute majority in the first round, relative majority in the second) wins half the seats. The other half is distributed proportionally among all the lists with a minimum of 5% of the vote (the first or second round, as appropriate).

The lists are blocked. Voters may not select individual candidates from lists, but must vote for an entire list. Each list must contain as many names as there are seats to be filled.

A municipal council may be composed of representatives from one list:

- If only one list is presented in the first or second round
- If, despite the presence of several lists, only one list got more than the 5% of the vote required to participate in the distribution of seats,
- If, between the two rounds, all of the lists were merged into one.

=== Special Cases of Paris, Lyon and Marseille ===
The three largest cities in France – Paris, Marseille and Lyon – are divided into electoral areas, corresponding to an arrondissement in Paris and Lyon, or formed by combining two arrondissements in the same area for Marseille.

Each of these sectors elect, following the voting procedure of cities with more than 1,000 residents, municipal councilors Seats for arrondissements councilors are then distributed according to the same rules between list members not appointed to council. All the councilors elected in each electoral area form the council of the arrondissement. The town of Paris is, since 1964, a unique case, being at the same time both a commune and a department, it is represented by only one deliberative assembly, called the council of Paris, which has both the role of a municipal council and a general council. The Mayor of Paris also serves as Chairman of the General Council of the department of Paris.

== Powers ==
The municipal council is chaired by the Mayor, and collectively has the legislative authority on the territory of the commune.

The mayor, primarily responsible for preparing and implementing the decisions of the council, is elected by the council, using a two-round system. Since the 2008 municipal elections, the election of deputy mayors in municipalities with more than 3,500 inhabitants is carried out using "party list by absolute majority, without splitting or preferential voting." On each of the lists of candidates for these positions, "the gap between the number of candidates of each gender can not be more than one", to ensure balanced representation of both sexes.

The municipal council has authority to regulate the affairs of the community through its deliberations. The council is empowered to make all decisions regarding communal management, except where the law specifically supports the mayor or other administrative authority.

The council makes decisions on the use of property in the municipality.

The council votes on the municipal budget, prepared by the mayor and his deputies, and local tax rates, creates and removes the jobs of municipal officials, allows acquisitions and disposals of the commune, approves loans and grants for the town, fixed tariffs for communal services and parking on the street.

The council adopts the local development plans, establishes primary and nursery schools.

The town owns public domain property (schools, municipal roads, gardens, etc.) and, if applicable, a private area. The public domain is protected by rules of inalienability and the law provides for sanctions to protect this property.

== Operation ==
The council meets at least once per quarter. In practice, it generally meets once a month.

The city council adopts its rules of procedure within the rule of law. The mayor will call the council to order whenever he considers it necessary and also to build the democratic legitimacy of this assembly elected by direct universal suffrage.

City council members are convened by relatively restrictive rules, indeed, the general code of local government imposes a minimum time to call for a meeting well in advance, so the council can prepare for the meeting. In light of this city council members may, if they think that they information, request submission of additional documents. This practice is often cause for cancellation of the city council.

Quorum rules are respected: there must be a minimum number of representatives to be present in order for a decision to be valid. In case the quorum is not obtained, the mayor must postpone deliberation and convene a new council for which no quorum shall be required in order to not block the functioning of the institution.

Any citizen can challenge and argue with the council. In the event of serious malfunction, the council may request a dissolution decree from the Council of Ministers.

== The Mayor ==
The municipal council of each commune elects the Mayor of the town. The mayor presides over the council, which organizes the work and performs the deliberations.

The Mayor also has significant powers and their own responsibilities, such as the responsibility for the activities of the municipal police, or the responsibility for the management of municipal council staff.

== City council for children (CME), youth (CMJ) and seniors (CMS) ==
There are certain communes with child councils and/or youth councils with multiple names (municipal youth councils, local youth councils, youth forum etc.).

The first municipal youth councils in France were created between 1963 and 1967 (including Sedan and a score of other medium-sized cities). These experiments have not experienced the same durability or the same media that children's councils Schiltigheim (Bas-Rhin) in 1979, often presented as the first French political experience. Other councils have been created in 1980, but especially since 1990 and early 2000s.

These informal bodies are created by municipal councils. Their mode of operation varies by commune, the age (9 to 25) and the input mode (election town hall, schools, designation within representative associations, volunteering, etc. mixed system).

These spaces are advisory (its deliberations carry no regulatory power if they are not approved by resolution of the elected council or mayor), but also allows young people to act for their country and take action. Formally, they are often chaired or served by a municipal councilor.

Each community that wishes to have a children's or youth council freely determines the operating rules of and operates according to the fundamental principles of the Republic, such as principle of non-discrimination. Usually they meet in committee or group projects 1–2 times per month and plenary 2–3 times a year. The average tenure is about 2 years.

According to the National associate of children's and youth councils which includes municipalities that have created one of these groups, there are currently 2000 groups nationally.

Some municipalities have established senior councils, operating according to rules similar to youth councils: for example, Antony, Hauts-de-Seine.

== See also ==
- Local government in France
- Municipal Council of Paris
- Municipal Organization Act of 1884
