= Épinal print =

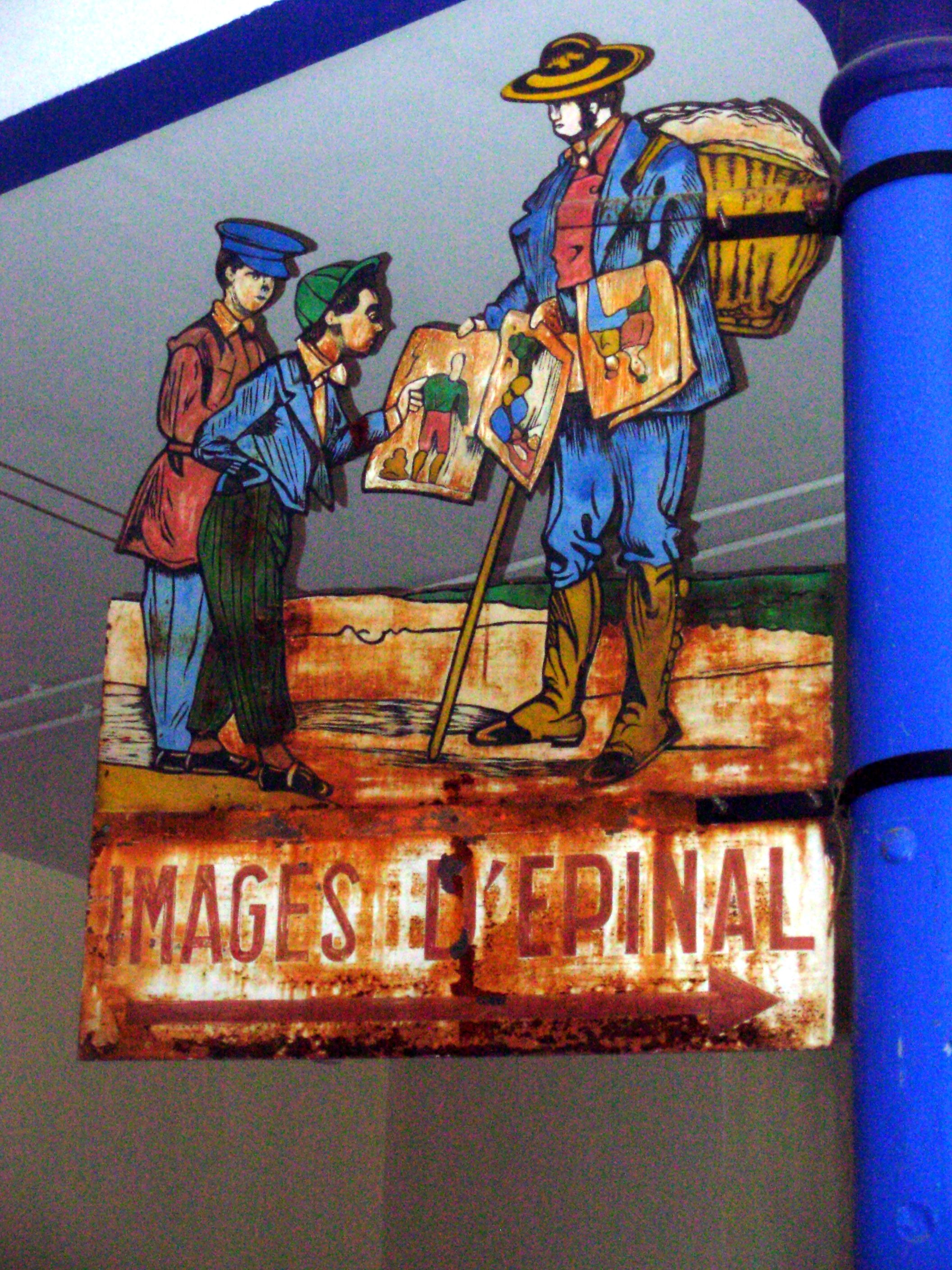
Old commercial signal pointing to the Imagerie d'Épinal location

An Épinal print (French: image d'Épinal) was a print on a popular subject rendered in bright, sharp colors, sold in France in the 19th century. Such prints owe their name to the fact that the first publisher of such images, Jean-Charles Pellerin, who was born in Épinal, named the printing house he founded in 1796 Imagerie d'Épinal.

The designation has entered common parlance in French to refer to a traditionalist and often naïve depiction of something, focusing only on its positive aspects.

These prints were frequently used as a point of comparison for criticizing the paintings of Gustave Courbet, notably his A Burial at Ornans and Peasants of Flagey Returning from the Fair, as well as the works of Édouard Manet. However, Émile Zola turned the comparison into praise when discussing some of Manet's works, such as The Fifer.

== Image gallery ==
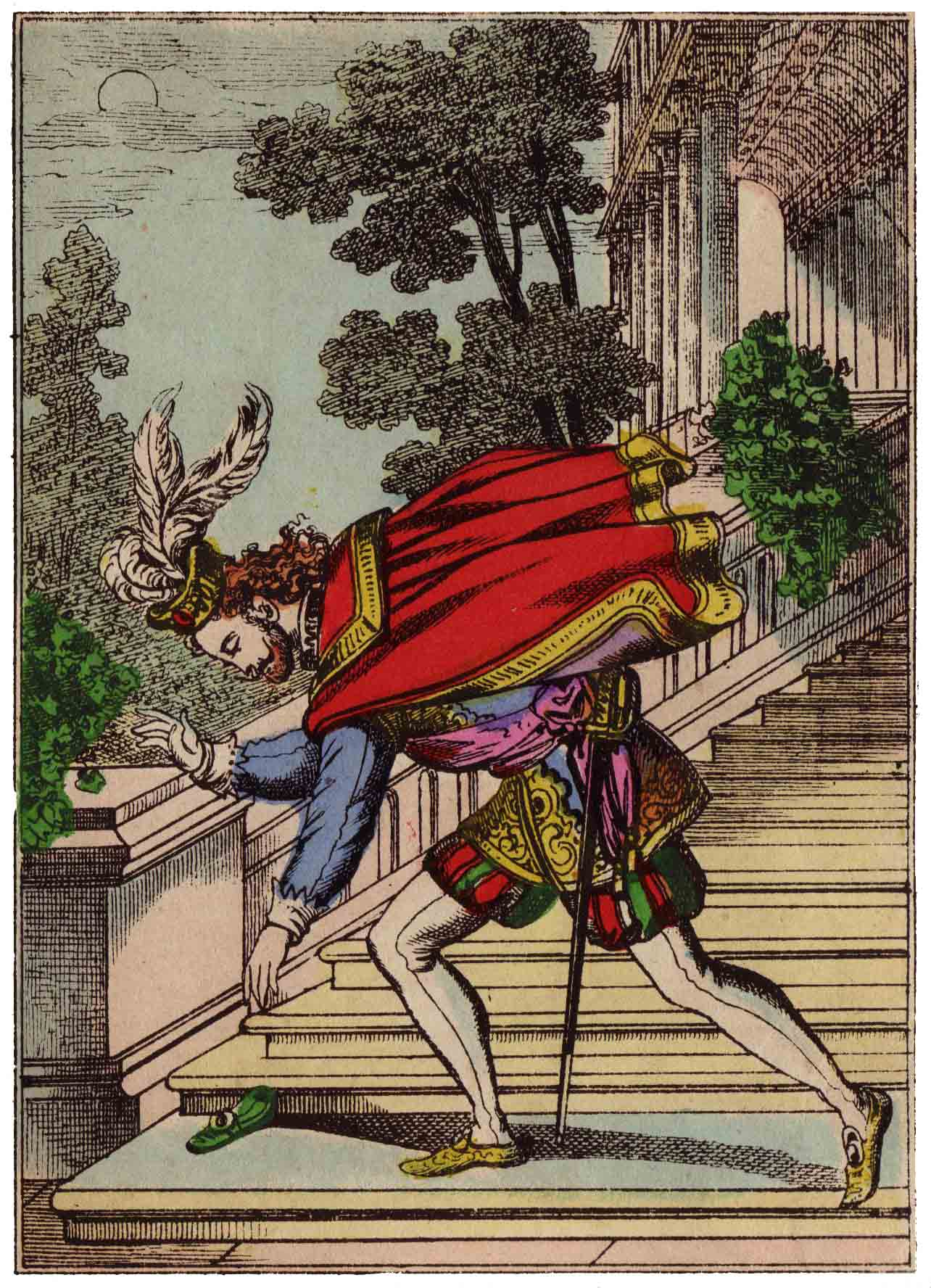
Cendrillon la pantoufle.

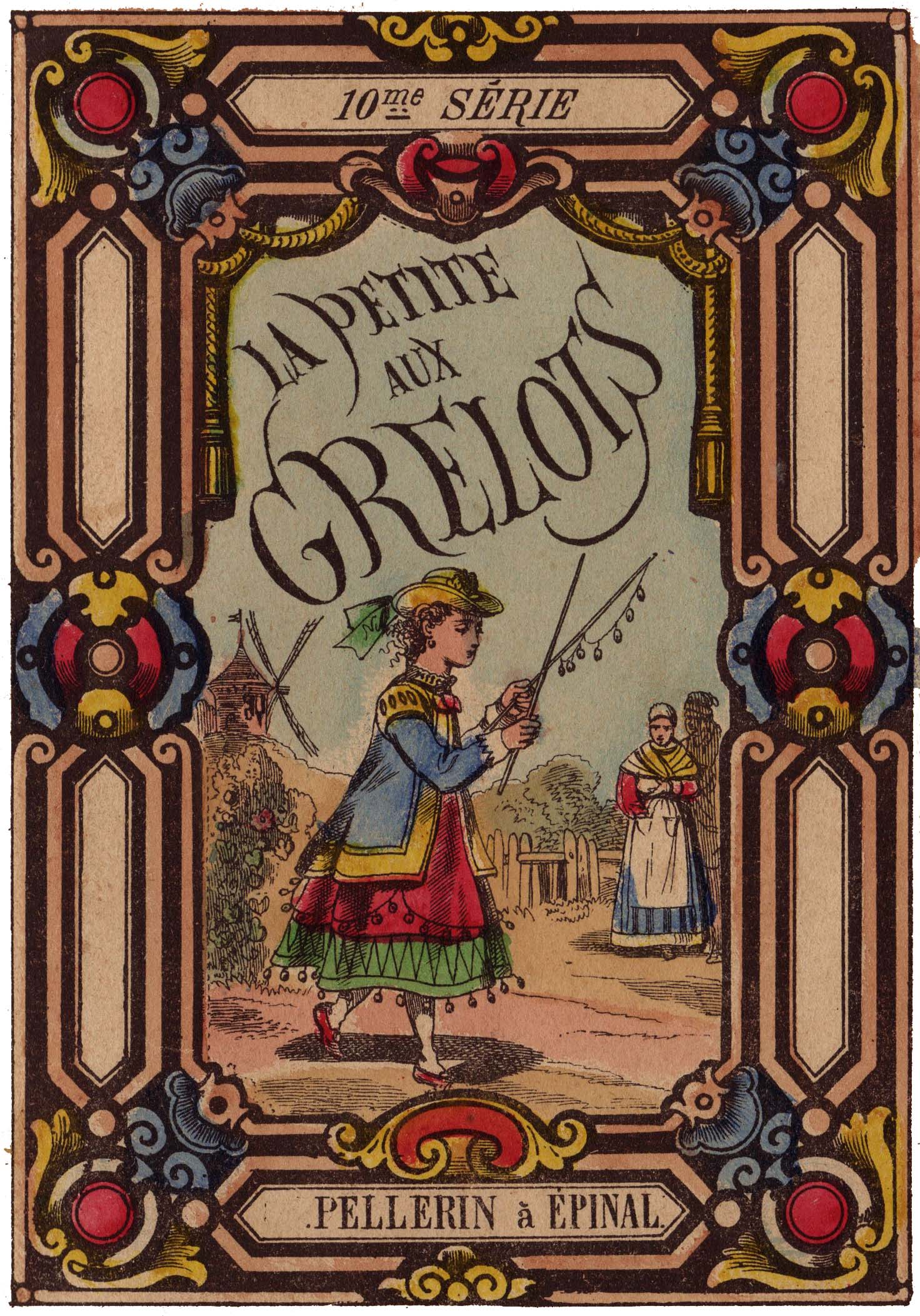
La Petite aux grelots.

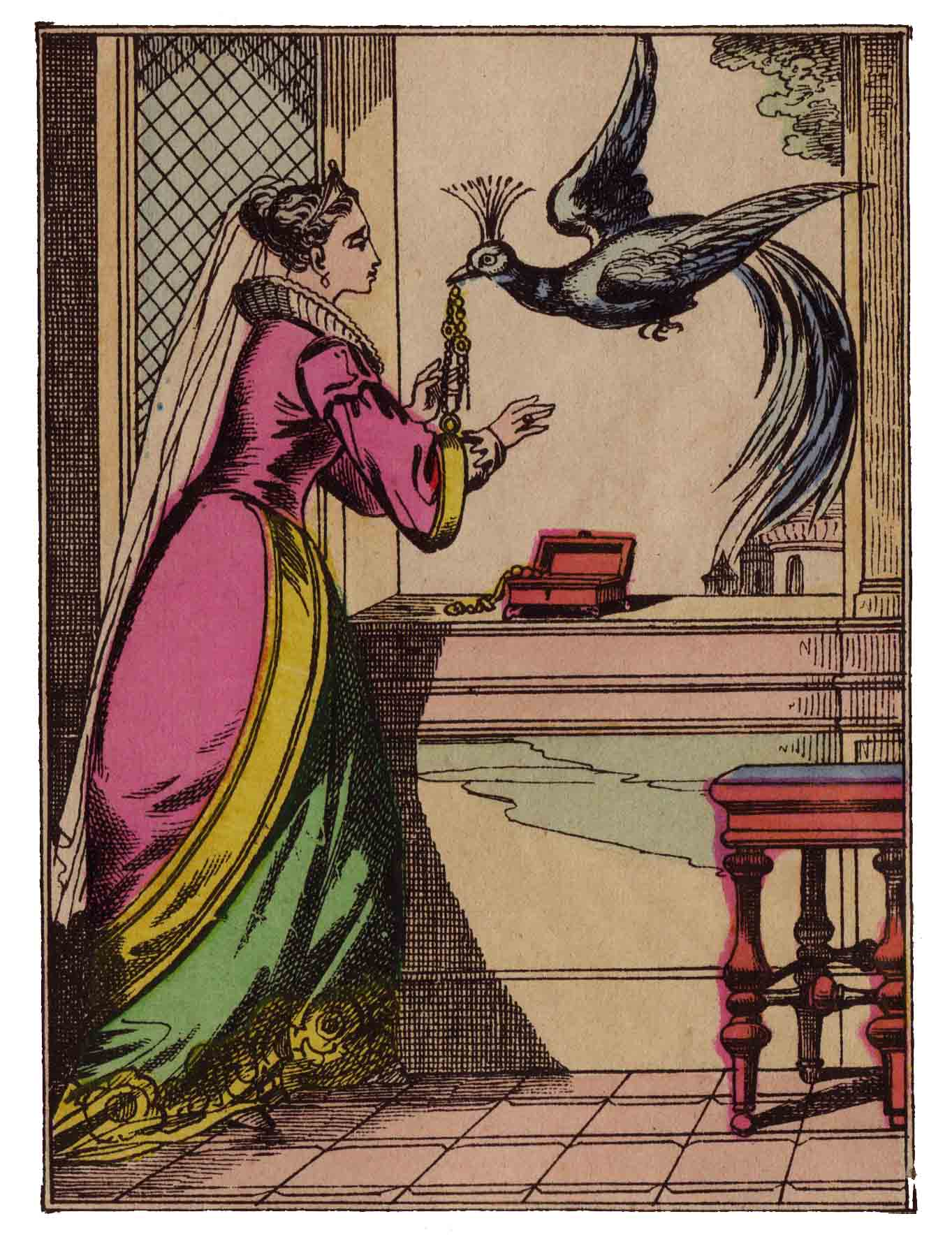
L’Oiseau bleu.

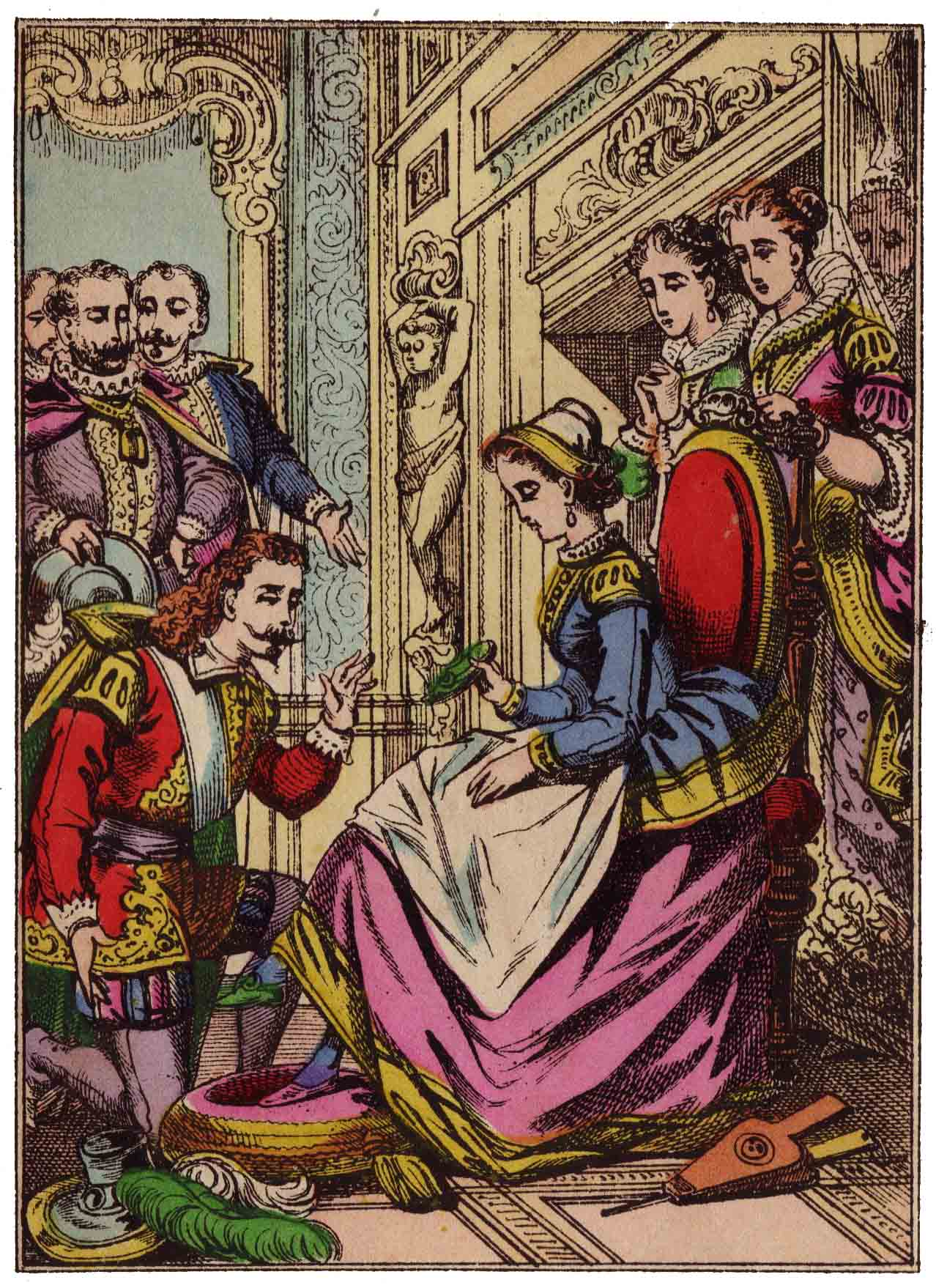
Trouver chaussure à son pied.

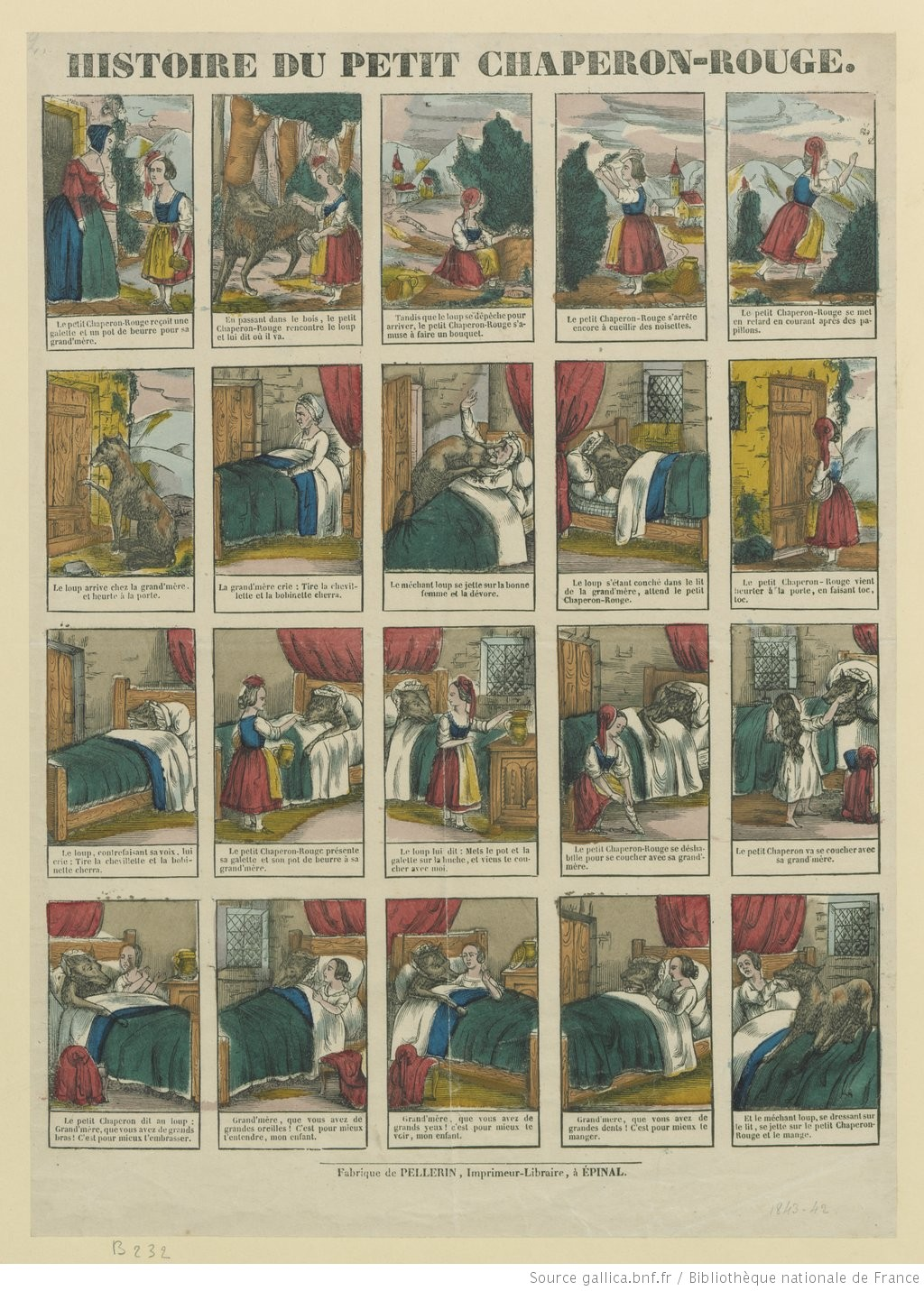
Histoire du Petit Chaperon-Rouge

== See also ==
Media related to Images d'Épinal at Wikimedia Commons
