= Albert Ronsin =

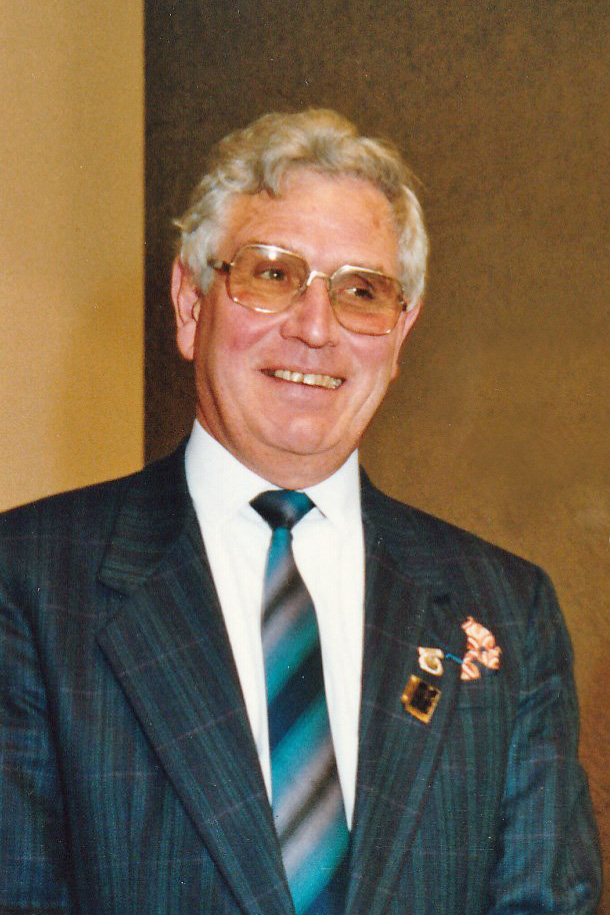
- Ronsin in 1996
- Born: 20 July 1928; Blois, France
- Died: 2 July 2007 (aged 78); Saint-Dié-des-Vosges, France
- Occupations: Historian; librarian; curator

Albert Ronsin (French pronunciation: [albɛʁ ʁɔ̃sɛ̃]; 20 July 1928 – 2 July 2007) was a 20th-century French scholar, historian, librarian, and curator in Saint-Dié-des-Vosges.

== Historian ==
He undertook historical research, especially about the Age of Discovery. He was particularly interested in the history of the name America given by Martin Waldseemüller to the continent that Amerigo Vespucci passed through and described. He studied globes and World maps of the early sixteenth, including Johannes Schöner globe created by Johann Schoener and Waldseemüller's maps.

He also studied the history of the Gymnase vosgien (Gymnasium Vosagense), a cultural and scientific association founded circa 1500 in Saint-Dié and from which came many humanists, including Matthias Ringmann and Vautrin Lud.

== Works ==
- 2006: Le nom de l'Amérique, l'invention des chanoines et savants de Saint-Dié, Éditions La Nuée bleue, Strasbourg
- 1992: Découverte et baptême de l'Amérique, Éditions Georges LePape, Montréal : 1979 (épuisé); réédition revue et augmentée, Éditions de l'Est
- 1991: La fortune d'un nom : America, baptême de l'Amérique à Saint-Dié-les-Vosges, Éditions Jérôme Millon, Grenoble
- 1990: Les Vosgiens célèbres: dictionnaire biographique illustré, Éditions Gérard Louis
- 1984: Répertoire bibliographique des livres imprimés en France au XVIIe siècle. Lorraine et Trois-évêchés, Éditions Koerner, Baden-Baden.
- 1979: Propositions pour une nouvelle structure des médiathèques publiques en France, Éditions Médiathèques publiques n°49, January–March.
- 1969: Saint-Dié-les-Vosges 669-1969, Éditions Publicité Moderne, Nancy.

He also published more than a hundred essays, notes and articles in various journals, annals, bulletins and historical, scientific and economic works.
