= Administrative divisions of France =

Metropolitan and overseas legal districts of France

Territories of France, excluding Antarctic territories. Citizens from all these territories, including the overseas administrative divisions, are French citizens, vote in national elections (presidential and legislative), and all of the inhabited territories are represented in the Senate.

The administrative divisions of France are concerned with the institutional and territorial organization of French territory. These territories are located in many parts of the world. There are many administrative divisions, which may have political (local government), electoral (districts), or administrative (decentralized services of the state) objectives. All the inhabited territories are represented in the National Assembly, Senate and Economic and Social Council and their citizens have French citizenship and elect the President of France.

== Division ==
=== Regions ===
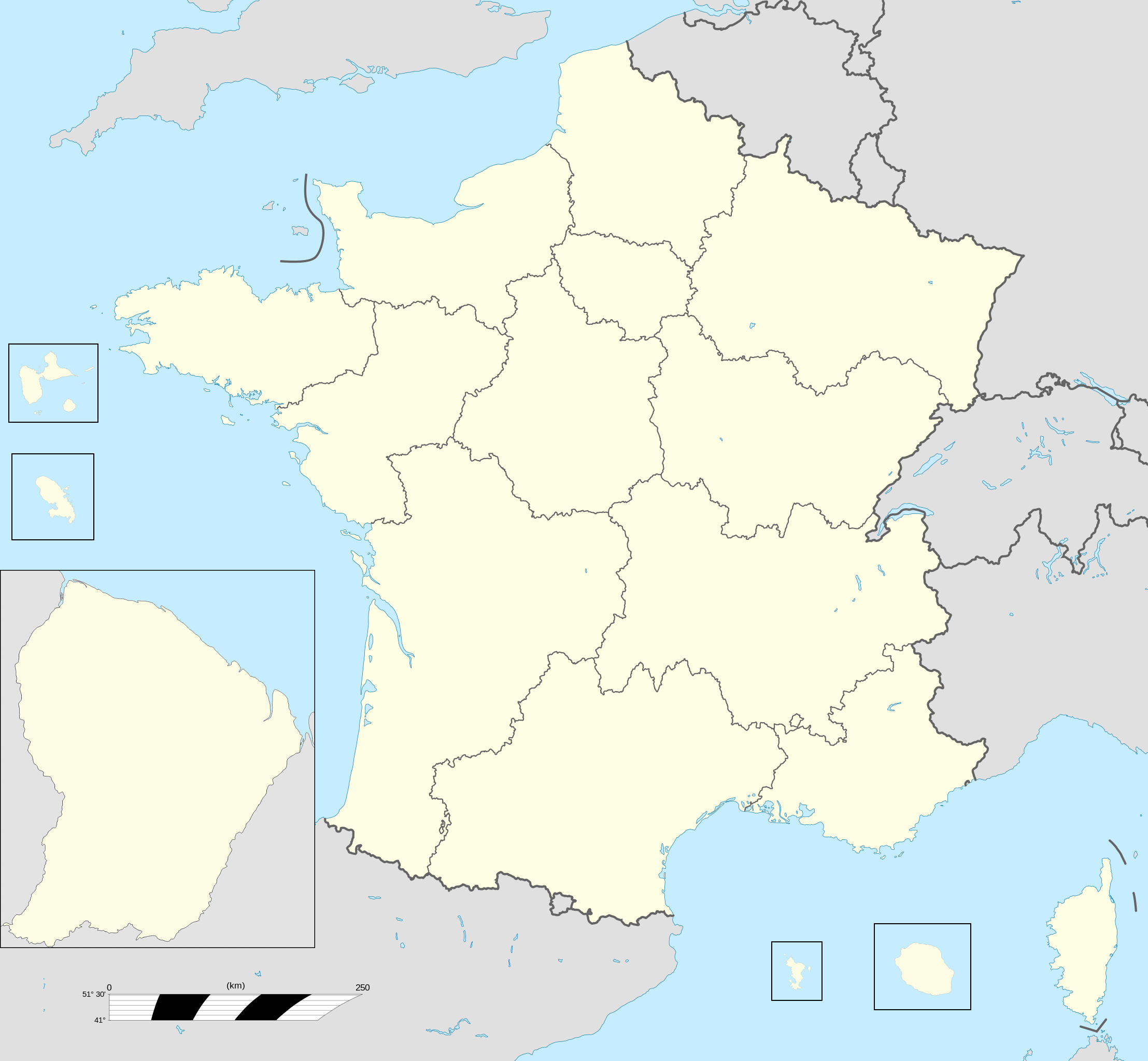

The French Republic is divided into 18 regions: 12 in mainland France and 6 elsewhere (1 in Europe: Corsica; 2 in the Caribbean (the Lesser Antilles): Guadeloupe and Martinique; 1 in South America: French Guiana; and 2 in the Indian Ocean near East Africa: Mayotte and Réunion). They are traditionally divided between the metropolitan regions, located on the European continent, and the overseas regions, located outside the European continent. Both have the same status and form the most integrated part of the French Republic.

==== Metropolitan regions ====
As of 1 January 2022, metropolitan France is divided into the following:

- 13 regions, including Corsica; although Corsica is formally a single territorial collectivity, it is considered equivalent to a region (local authority).
- The regions are subdivided into 96 departments (local authority).
  - The departments are subdivided into 320 arrondissements (not a public or legal entity).
    - The departments are subdivided into 1,995 cantons (not a public or legal entity).
- The departments are subdivided into 34,826 communes (local authority).
  - Three urban communes (Paris, Marseille, and Lyon) are further divided into municipal arrondissements. There are 20 arrondissements of Paris, 16 arrondissements of Marseille, and 9 arrondissements of Lyon.
  - The city of Marseille is also divided into 8 municipal sectors. Each sector is composed of two arrondissements.
  - There are also 710 associated communes (as of January 2009), formerly independent communes which were merged with larger communes but have retained some limited degree of autonomy (e.g., the commune of Lomme which was absorbed by Lille in 2000 and transformed into an "associated commune" inside the commune of Lille).

==== Overseas regions ====
Five overseas regions (régions d'outre-mer, or ROM), which have the same status as metropolitan regions. The overseas regions are as follows:

- French Guiana
- Guadeloupe
- Martinique
- Mayotte
- Réunion

Each overseas region is coextensive with an overseas department (département d'outre-mer, or DOM), again with the same status as departments in metropolitan France. The first four overseas departments were created in 1946 and preceded the four overseas regions, Mayotte became a DOM in 2011. The dual structure of overseas region and overseas department, with two separate assemblies administering the same territory, results from the extension of the regional system to the overseas departments in the 1970s. Each overseas region or department may transform into a single territorial collectivity, with the merger of the regional and departmental assemblies, which voters in Martinique and French Guiana approved in two referendums in 2010. In Réunion, the creation of a second department for the southern part of the island has been debated for some time.

- The overseas departments are subdivided into 12 arrondissements (Mayotte does not have arrondissements).
  - The 12 arrondissements are further subdivided into 153 cantons with Mayotte having another 19 cantons.
- The 172 cantons are composed of 129 communes. (In the five DOM, there are more cantons than communes, unlike in metropolitan France, because many communes are divided into several cantons, whereas in metropolitan France in general cantons are made up of several communes, except in large communes like Toulouse or Lille which are divided into several cantons.)

=== Overseas collectivities ===
The five overseas collectivities of France

The French Republic includes five overseas collectivities (collectivités d'outre-mer, or COM) with a semi-autonomous status:

- French Polynesia (designated as an "overseas country", French: pays d'outre-mer) is divided into 5 administrative subdivisions (subdivisions administratives). For elections, it is divided into six electoral districts (circonscriptions électorales), which differ slightly from the 5 administrative subdivisions. The 5 administrative subdivisions are divided into 48 communes. There also exist some associated communes as in metropolitan France.
- Saint Barthélemy (designated as a "collectivity", French: collectivité) is a new overseas collectivity created on 22 February 2007. It was previously a commune inside the Guadeloupe department. The commune structure was abolished, and Saint Barthélemy is now one of only three permanently inhabited territories of the French Republic with no commune structure. There are no cantons and arrondissements either.
- Saint Martin (designated as a "collectivity", French: collectivité) is also a new overseas collectivity created on 22 February 2007. It was also previously a commune inside the Guadeloupe department. The commune structure was abolished and Saint Martin is now one of only three permanently inhabited territories of the French Republic with no commune structure. There are also no cantons or arrondissements.
- Saint Pierre and Miquelon (designated as a "territorial collectivity", French: collectivité territoriale, the same designation as Corsica, a region and not an overseas collectivity) is divided into 2 communes with no arrondissements or cantons.
- Wallis and Futuna (designated as a "territory", French: territoire) is divided into 3 districts (circonscriptions territoriales), which exactly match the three traditional chiefdoms (royaumes coutumiers) with their traditional kings still at their head, the only kings currently recognized in the French Republic. These 3 districts are Uvea, Sigave, and Alo. Uvea is the most populous and is further divided into 3 wards (districts in French): Hahake, Mua, and Hihifo. Wallis and Futuna is one of only three permanently inhabited territories of the French Republic with no communes (the others being Saint Barthélemy and Saint Martin). It also has no arrondissements or cantons.

=== New Caledonia ===
The French Republic includes one autonomous collectivity, New Caledonia

New Caledonia's status is unique in the French Republic: it is the only French local government that is not a territorial collectivity (although its subdivisions are territorial collectivities). It is regarded as a sui generis collectivity, which means that local government and parliament have the power to pass and enforce specific laws without seeking the consent of the French Government; unless such laws are declared illegitimate by the Constitutional Council in a specific proceeding brought to the Constitutional Council. As agreed in the 1998 Nouméa Accord, a New Caledonian citizenship was established (in addition to the French citizenship which is kept in parallel, along with the consequent European citizenship) and a self-determination referendum was held in 2018. Two follow-up referendums were held in 2020 and 2021.

- It is divided into 3 provinces.
- The provinces are subdivided into 33 communes.

=== Territories without civilian population ===
These territories have no permanent civilian population. The residents consist of military personnel, scientific researchers, and support staff.

==== Overseas territory ====
1 overseas territory (territoire d'outre-mer, or TOM): the French Southern and Antarctic Lands, which have no permanent population and no communes.

- The French Southern and Antarctic Lands are divided into five districts (districts in French):
  - Adélie Land
  - Crozet Islands
  - Kerguelen Islands
  - Saint Paul Island and Amsterdam Island
  - The Scattered Islands (Îles Éparses), a collection of five non-permanently inhabited island groups in the Indian Ocean: Bassas da India, Europa Island, the Glorioso Islands (including Banc du Geyser), Juan de Nova Island, and Tromelin Island. These were previously administered separately but they have been combined into the French Southern and Antarctic Lands since February 2007. Scattered Islands in the Indian Ocean around Madagascar, mainly in the Mozambique Channel, the scattered islands, "confetti of the French colonial empire," are of strategic importance due to the extent of their economic area of interest. France asserts its presence there with small military detachments.

==== Directly controlled by the Minister of the Overseas ====
- Clipperton Island: an uninhabited island in the Pacific Ocean off the coast of Mexico that is directly under the authority of the Minister of the Overseas in Paris (until February 2007 it was administered by the high-commissioner of the French Republic in French Polynesia). Since the Scattered Islands were also combined with the French Southern and Antarctic Lands in February 2007, Clipperton Island is now the only island left in this category.

== Territorial collectivities ==
French subdivisions that have a (limited) freedom of administration are called territorial collectivities. Among them are regions, departments, communes, overseas collectivities, provinces (only present in New Caledonia), and the territorial collectivity of Corsica which belongs to no category (but is usually grouped with the regions). New Caledonia is unique as it is not a territorial collectivity.

== General rules ==
Citizens from all parts of France, including the overseas administrative divisions, vote in national elections (presidential, legislative), and all of the collectivities are represented in the Senate.

== Responsibilities ==
Some areas are the clear responsibility of one level of government (e.g. the state is responsible for international issues), but in other areas it is shared across some or all levels of government (e.g. transport, parks, tourism, culture, and sport get different types of support from different levels).

- The national government is responsible for the military, foreign policy, immigration, economic policy, environment, agriculture, food and drug safety, health insurance, the justice system, National Police, military police (National Gendarmerie), Paris region emergency services, higher education, research, and national support for culture and sport
- Regions cannot write their own laws, but can raise taxes and are responsible for high schools, public transit, universities and research, and assistance to business owners.
- Departments are responsible for junior high schools, social and welfare allowances, local roads, school and rural buses, and a subsidy for municipal infrastructure.
- Communes are responsible for local roads, municipal police, water management, and garbage collection, vital records, local prosecutions, local elections, and registration for civil service and elections.

== List of departments by region ==
=== Metropolitan France ===
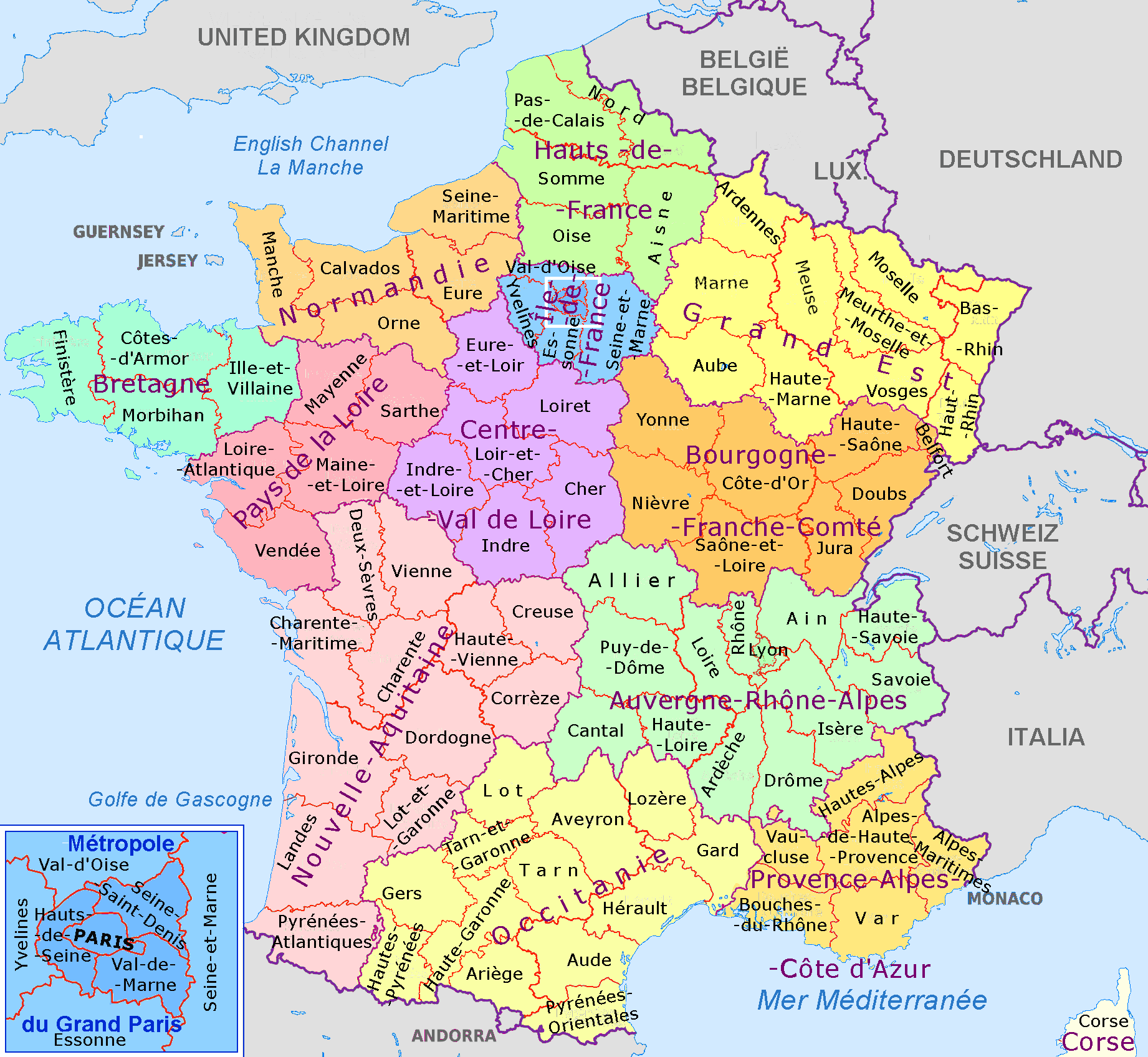
Regions and departments of Metropolitan France

- Auvergne-Rhône-Alpes
  - 01 Ain
  - 03 Allier
  - 07 Ardèche
  - 15 Cantal
  - 26 Drôme
  - 38 Isère
  - 42 Loire
  - 43 Haute-Loire
  - 63 Puy-de-Dôme
  - 69D Rhône
  - 69M Lyon Metropolis
  - 73 Savoie
  - 74 Haute-Savoie
- Bourgogne-Franche-Comté
  - 21 Côte-d'Or
  - 25 Doubs
  - 39 Jura
  - 58 Nièvre
  - 70 Haute-Saône
  - 71 Saône-et-Loire
  - 89 Yonne
  - 90 Territoire de Belfort
- Brittany (Bretagne)
  - 22 Côtes-d'Armor
  - 29 Finistère
  - 35 Ille-et-Vilaine
  - 56 Morbihan
- Centre-Val de Loire
  - 18 Cher
  - 28 Eure-et-Loir
  - 36 Indre
  - 37 Indre-et-Loire
  - 41 Loir-et-Cher
  - 45 Loiret
- Corsica (Corse/Corsica)
  - 2A Corse-du-Sud
  - 2B Haute-Corse
- Île-de-France
  - 75 Paris
  - 77 Seine-et-Marne
  - 78 Yvelines
  - 91 Essonne
  - 92 Hauts-de-Seine
  - 93 Seine-Saint-Denis
  - 94 Val-de-Marne
  - 95 Val-d'Oise
- Grand Est
  - 08 Ardennes
  - 10 Aube
  - 51 Marne
  - 52 Haute-Marne
  - 54 Meurthe-et-Moselle
  - 55 Meuse
  - 57 Moselle
  - 67 Bas-Rhin
  - 68 Haut-Rhin
  - 88 Vosges
- Hauts-de-France
  - 02 Aisne
  - 59 Nord
  - 60 Oise
  - 62 Pas-de-Calais
  - 80 Somme
- Normandy (Normandie)
  - 14 Calvados
  - 27 Eure
  - 50 Manche
  - 61 Orne
  - 76 Seine-Maritime
- Nouvelle-Aquitaine
  - 16 Charente
  - 17 Charente-Maritime
  - 19 Corrèze
  - 23 Creuse
  - 24 Dordogne
  - 33 Gironde
  - 40 Landes
  - 47 Lot-et-Garonne
  - 64 Pyrénées-Atlantiques
  - 79 Deux-Sèvres
  - 86 Vienne
  - 87 Haute-Vienne
- Occitanie
  - 09 Ariège
  - 11 Aude
  - 12 Aveyron
  - 30 Gard
  - 31 Haute-Garonne
  - 32 Gers
  - 34 Hérault
  - 46 Lot
  - 48 Lozère
  - 65 Hautes-Pyrénées
  - 66 Pyrénées-Orientales
  - 81 Tarn
  - 82 Tarn-et-Garonne
- Pays de la Loire
  - 44 Loire-Atlantique
  - 49 Maine-et-Loire
  - 53 Mayenne
  - 72 Sarthe
  - 85 Vendée
- Provence-Alpes-Côte d'Azur
  - 04 Alpes-de-Haute-Provence
  - 05 Hautes-Alpes
  - 06 Alpes-Maritimes
  - 13 Bouches-du-Rhône
  - 83 Var
  - 84 Vaucluse

=== Overseas departments and collectivities ===
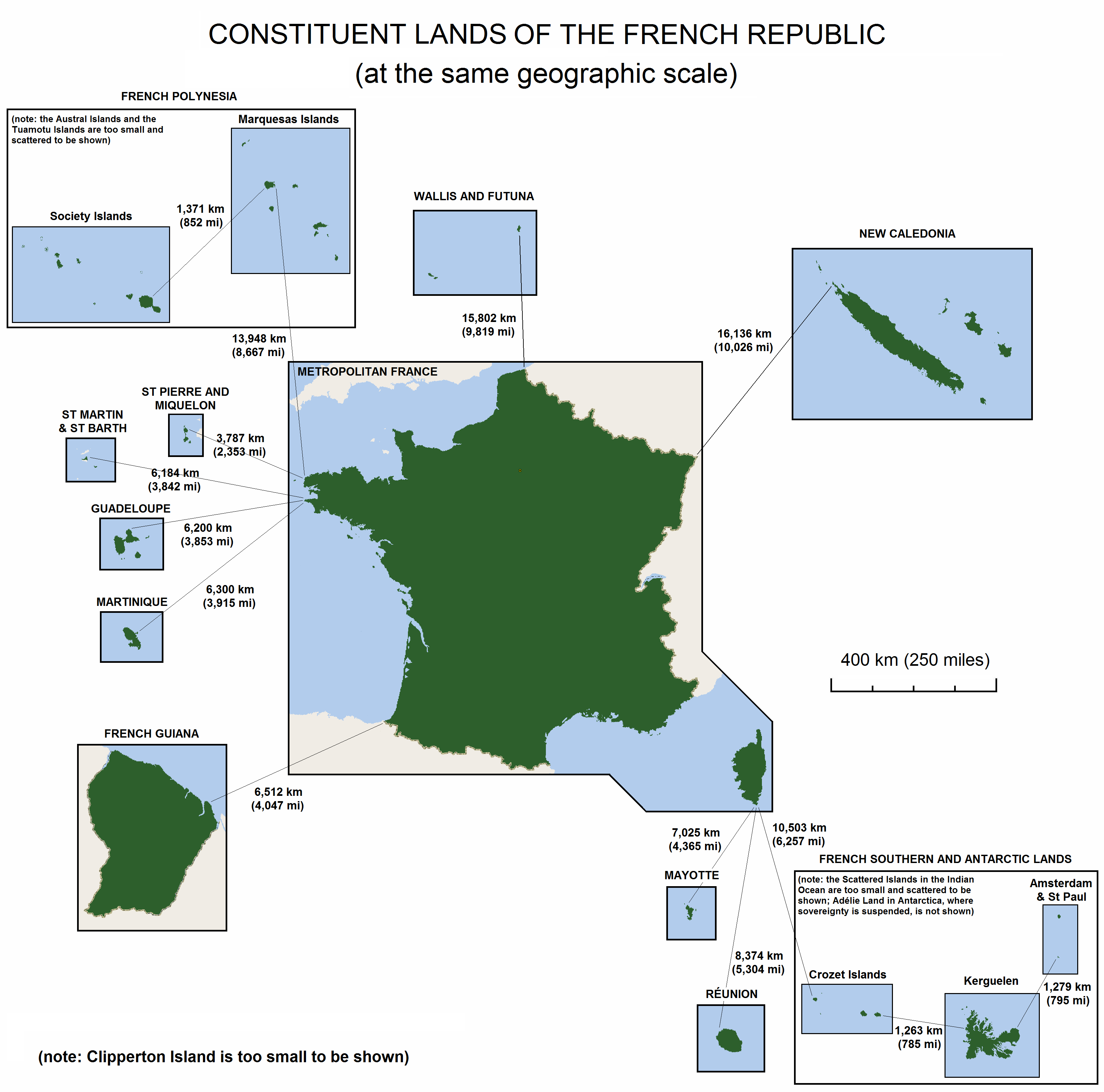
Metropolitan France, overseas departments and overseas collectivities

- Overseas departments (the following are both departments and regions)
  - 971 Guadeloupe
  - 972 Martinique
  - 973 French Guiana
  - 974 Réunion
  - 976 Mayotte
- Overseas collectivities
  - 975 Saint Pierre and Miquelon
  - 977 Saint Barthélemy
  - 978 Saint Martin
  - 986 Wallis and Futuna
  - 987 French Polynesia (was also given the designation of overseas country)
- Sui generis collectivity
  - 988 New Caledonia
- Overseas territory
  - 984 French Southern and Antarctic Lands (including France's Antarctic claim and the Scattered Islands in the Indian Ocean)
- Special status
  - 989 Clipperton Island

== Historical divisions ==
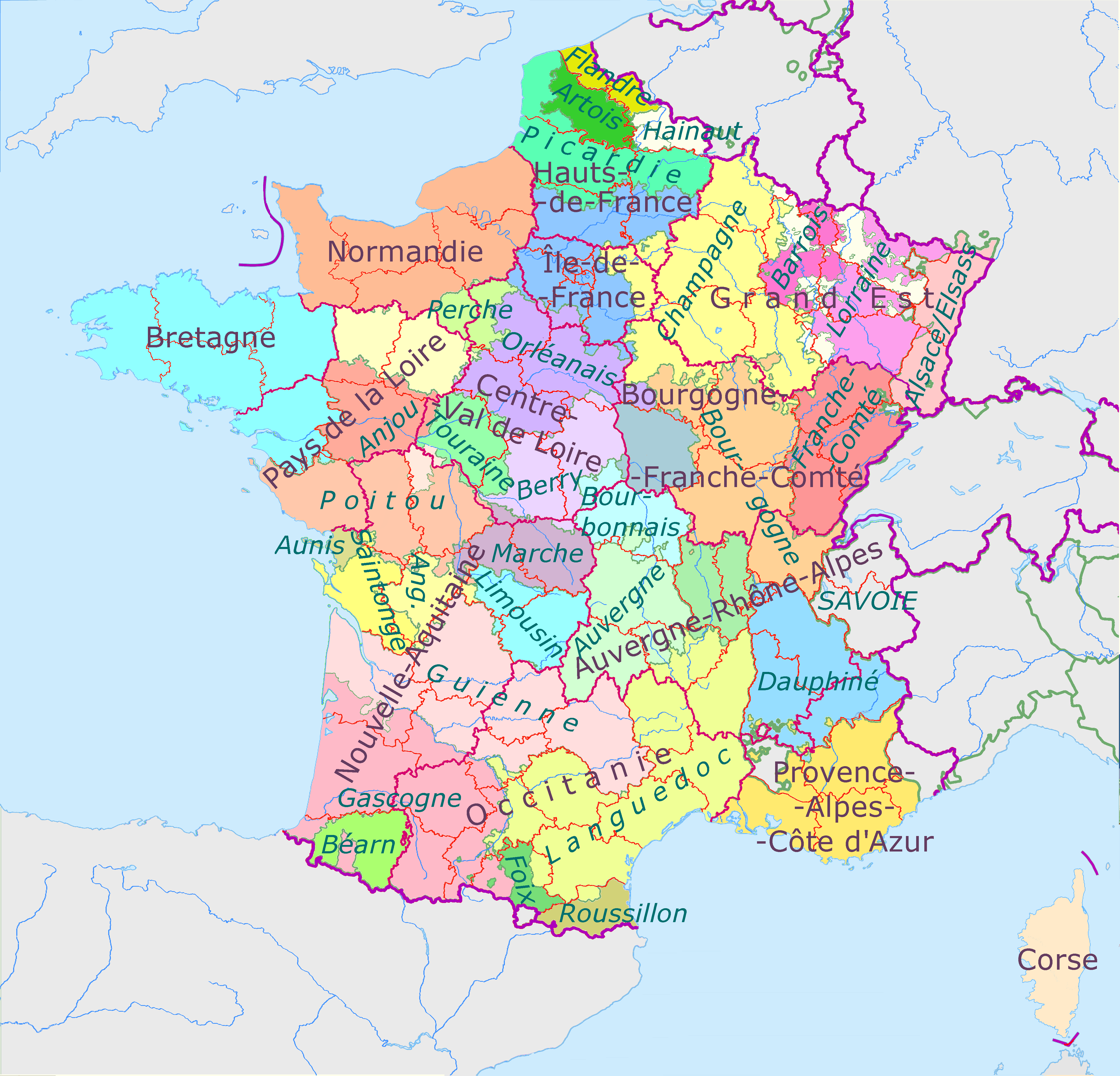
Provinces of royal France superimposed by modern administrative boundaries and the names of the actual regions

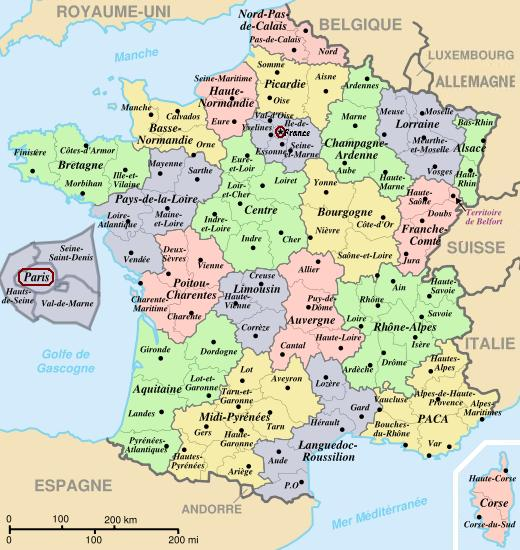
Regions and departments of France from 1982 to 2015

Historically, France was divided into a complex mosaic of more or less independent entities. Their gradual incorporation into France as provinces may be followed in the article Territorial formation of France.

== See also ==
- 2009 Mahoran status referendum
- Decentralisation in France
- List of 35 largest French metropolitan areas by population
- Outre-mer
- Overseas collectivity
- Overseas department and region
- Overseas France
- Overseas Territories of France (European Parliament constituency)
- Overseas territory
- Special member state territories and the European Union
- Zone d'études et d'aménagement du territoire (ZEAT), the eight statistical divisions of metropolitan (mainland) France
- Municipal Organization Act of 1884
