= Zone d'études et d'aménagement du territoire =

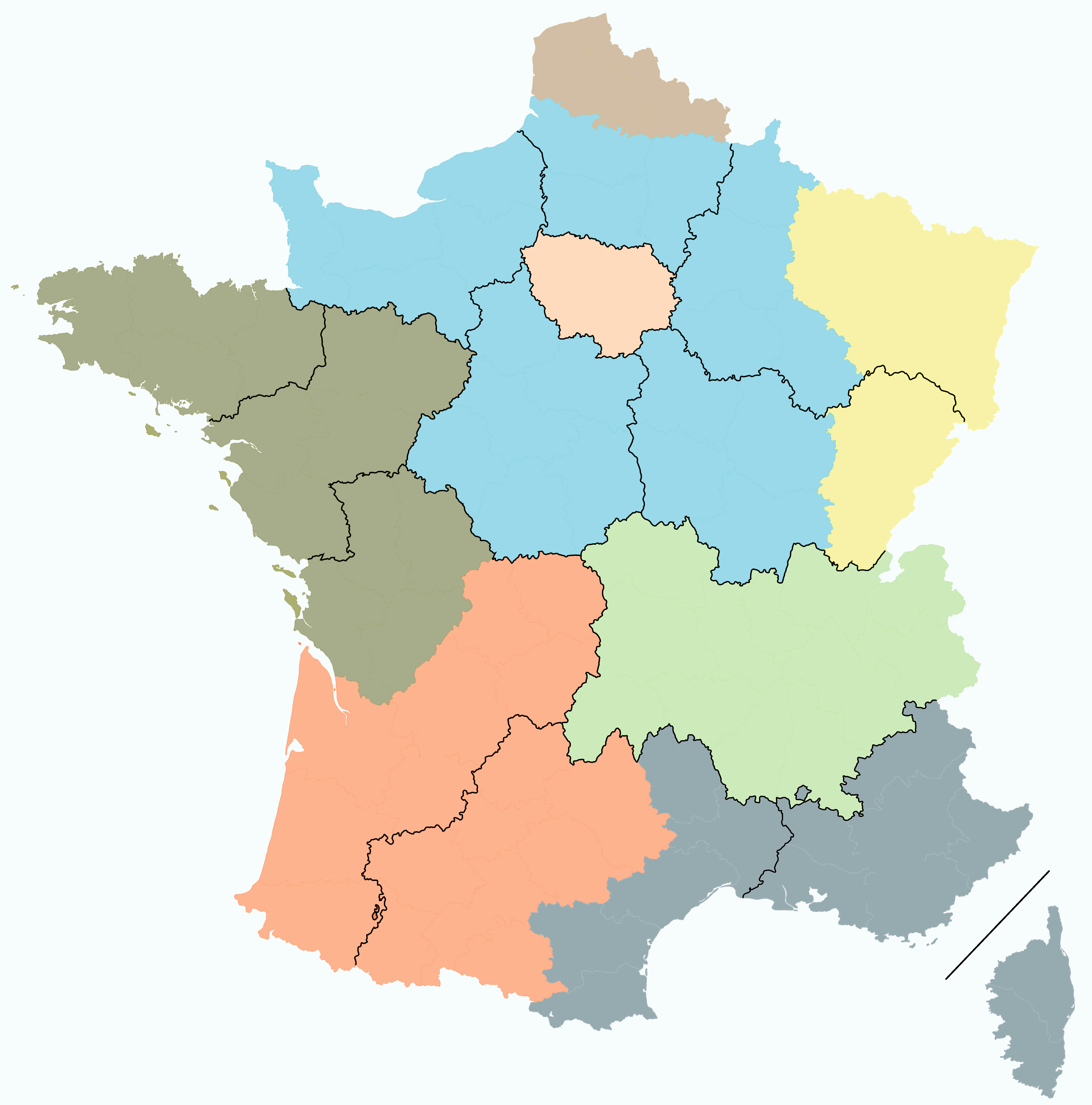
Eight ZEAT of metropolitan France, with each color denoting one ZEAT. Also visible are the borders (in black) of the 13 metropolitan regions

In 1967 the Institut national de la statistique et des études économiques (French National Institute for Statistics and Economic Studies, INSEE), together with the French Commissariat général and DATAR (Délégation à l'aménagement du territoire et à l'action régionale) declared the nominal division of France into eight large regions. These were named Zones d'études et d'aménagement du territoire (Research and National Development Zones) or ZEAT.

Until the end of 2017, the ZEAT corresponded to the first level in the European Union Nomenclature of Territorial Units for Statistics (NUTS 1).
