= Feuille d'or de la ville de Nancy =

The Feuille d'or de la ville de Nancy is a literary award, awarded on the occasion of the livre sur la place at Nancy. It rewards a Lorraine author or whose work concerns Lorraine.

== List of laureates ==
- 2020: Laurent Petitmangin, Ce qu'il faut de nuit
- 2019: Joffrine Donnadieu, Une Histoire de France
- 2018: Nicolas Mathieu, Leurs enfants après eux
- 2017: Mathieu Jung, Le Triomphe de Thomas
- 2016: Hélène Gestern, L'Odeur de la forêt, Arléa
- 2015: Carole Martinez, La terre qui penche, Gallimard
- 2014: Benoît Duteurtre, L'ordinateur du Paradis, Gallimard
- 2012: David Haziot, Le roman des Rouart, Fayard
- 2011: Éric Reinhardt, Le Système Victoria
- 2009: Jean Vautrin for all his work
- 2008: Les enfants de l'école Gustave-Eiffel de Pompey and Michel Caffier - Qui a volé la Tour Eiffel ?
- 2007: Michel Picard, Matantemma
- 2006: Élise Fontenaille, Brûlements
- 2005: Anne-Sophie Brasme, Le Carnaval des monstres
- 2004: Louisa Maurin, Fille de personne
- 2003: Pierre Pelot, C'est ainsi que les hommes vivent
- 2002: Jeanne Cressanges, Les Ailes d'Isis
- 2001: Élise Fischer, L'Inaccomplie
- 2000: François Bon et les écrivains SDF, La Douceur dans l'abîme
- 1999: Philippe Claudel, Meuse, l'oubli
- 1998: Michel Caffier, Le Hameau des mirabelliers
- 1997: François Baudin, Histoire économique et sociale de la Lorraine
- 1996: Jean-Noël Jeanneney, Une histoire des médias
- 1995: Yves Courrière, Pierre Lazareff ou Le Vagabond de l'actualité
- 1994: Françoise Giroud, Journal d'une Parisienne
- 1993: Jacques Derogy and Jean-Marie Pontaut, Investigation - Passion
- 1992: Jean Ferniot, Je recommencerais bien
- 1991: Alain Ménargues, Les Larmes de la colère
- 1990: Michel Castex, Un mensonge gros comme le siècle
- 1989: René-Victor Pilhes, La Médiatrice
- 1988: Michel Wieviorka, Dominique Wolton, Terrorisme à la Une
- 1987: Michèle Cotta, Les Miroirs de Jupiter
- 1986: Claude Kévers-Pascalis, Crésus
