= Alain Louyot =

French reporter and war correspondent

Alain Louyot (French: [alɛ̃ lujo]; born 1948 in Nancy), is a French senior reporter and war correspondent.

Alain Louyot has been an economic and foreign policy journalist for 40 years at RMC, RFI, RTL, La Vie française, war correspondent, chief reporter at Le Point from 1972 to the enf of 1985 (Albert Londres Prize in 1985), deputy editor and then editor at L'Express (1986–2005) and editorial director of L'Expansion (until the end of 2009, prize of the best economic magazine of the year). He joined the Elan agency in 2010 as Vice President.

Alain Louyot is also the author of several books and participates in various juries: Institut d'études politiques de Paris, Institut pratique du journalisme, life member of the jury of the Albert London Prize and vice-president of the Albert Londres Association (2010).

== Bibliography ==
- 1985: Enquête Sur Trois Secrets D'état, Jacques Derogy, Jean-Marie Pontaut, in collaboration with Alain Louyot, ISBN 2221052064

- (Prix Albert-Londres)

- 1989: Gosses de guerre, Éditions Robert Laffont, Paris, 1989. 245 p. ISBN 2-221-05864-X, Grand Prix de l'UNICEF and Prix Vérité 1989 of the city of Le Cannet
- 1995: La Palestine : les enjeux de la situation actuelle, Hachette (series "Qui, quand, quoi ?"), Paris, 79 p. BnF 35781211c, ISBN 9782012914520
- 1996: Israël : un pays pour idéal, Hachette (series "Qui, quand, quoi?"), Paris, 79 p. ISBN 2-01-291611-2
- 2010: Carnets de la passagère, narrative, Éditions Grasset & Fasquelle, ISBN 978-2-246-74361-3
- 2012: Histoire de l'Adoption (Editions François Bourin), ISBN 978-2849413395
