= Jeanne Cressanges =

French writer (1929–2024)

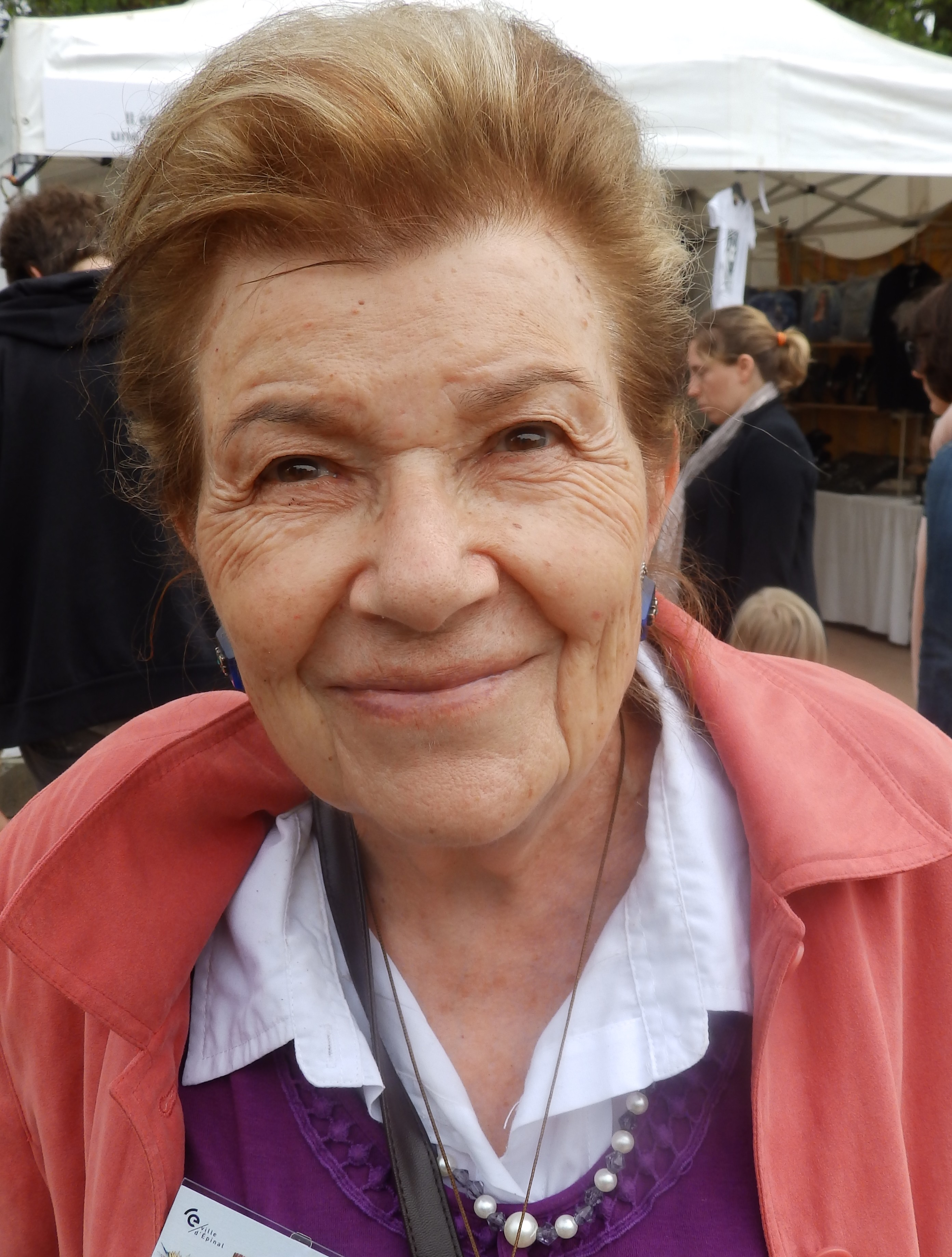
- Cressanges in 2016
- Born: Jeanne Mouchonnier; 6 May 1929; Noyant-d'Allier, France
- Died: 27 July 2024 (aged 95)
- Occupations: Novelist; Essayist; Screenwriter

Jeanne Cressanges, real name Jeanne Mouchonnier (6 May 1929 – 27 July 2024) was a French screenwriter, dialoguist, essayist, and novelist.

== Biography ==
Jeanne Cressanges was born in a modest family of the Bourbonnais. Her paternal family was a family of plasterers-painters from Dompierre-sur-Besbre, Her maternal family was a peasant family of Noyant-d'Allier. Her father, Jules Mouchonnier, worked for the railways. She grew up in Saint-Sornin, in the Bourbonnaise countryside.

Between 1960 and 1970, she was a reader at Éditions Julliard and a columnist at Les Nouvelles littéraires. In 1968, she moved to Épinal, to follow her husband. The Vosges department was the setting for several of his novels, like Les Eaux rouges and Le Luthier de Mirecourt.

Cressanges died on 27 July 2024, at the age of 95.

== Works ==
Novels

- 1959: La Femme et le manuscrit, Éditions Grasset
- 1962: La Feuille de bétel, Casterman.
- 1963: Le Cœur en tête, Casterman – Prix de la ville de Vichy 1964
- 1967: La Part du soleil, Julliard
- 1969: La Chambre interdite, Julliard
- 1973: Mourir à Djerba, Éditions Denoël
- 1984: La Mariée de Saint-Médard, Flammarion – Jeanne Cressanges was host of Bernard Pivot in Apostrophes for this novel
- 1988: Les Eaux rouges, F. Bourin – Jeanne Cressanges was host of Bernard Pivot in Apostrophes for this novel
- 1995: Les Trois Naissances de Virgine, Julliard – Prix Allen
- 1997: Un Amour de 48 heures, Flammarion
- 1999: Le Luthier de Mirecourt, Denoël
- 2002: Les Ailes d'Isis, Le Cherche midi – Feuille d'or de la ville de Nancy
- 2005: Le Soleil des pierres, Le Cherche midi – Prix Erckmann-Chatrian
- 2019: Un père en héritage, S. Domini éd.

Essays

- 1976: Les chagrins d'amour, Grasset
- 1979: La vraie vie des femmes commence à quarante ans, Grasset
- 1982: Ce que les femmes n'ont jamais dit, Grasset – Jeanne Cressanges was host of Bernard Pivot in Apostrophes for this essay
- 1986: Parlez-moi d’amour, Flammarion
- 1992: Seules François Bourin

Tale

- 1995: La Petite Fille aux doigts tachés d'encre, Flammarion

Short stories

- 2012: Soledades, Ed. du Murmure
- 2014: Rencontres, Ed. du Murmure
- 2016: Entre deux sourires, S. Domini éd.

Trivia

- 2009: Je vous écris d'Épinal, S. Domini éd.
- 2011: Je vous écris du Bourbonnais. S. Domini éd. – Prix Allen
- 2014: Mes Vosges. Itinéraires amoureux, S. Domini éd.

Cinematographic adaptations, scenarios and dialogues

- 1968: L'Étrangère, film by Sergio Gobbi, in collaboration with the director
- 1969: Maldonne, film by Sergio Gobbi, in collaboration with the director
- 1969: Une fille nommée Amour, film by Sergio Gobbi, in collaboration with the director
- 1970: Delphine, film by Éric Le Hung, in collaboration with the director
- 1971: La Fin d'une liaison, telefilm by Edmond Tyborowski, adapted from the novel by Graham Greene
- 1973: La Feuille de bétel, serial in four episodes by Odette Collet, adapted from her novel La Feuille de bétel

== Bibliography ==
- Michel Caffier (2003). "Jeanne Cressanges". Dictionnaire des littératures de Lorraine (in French). Vol. 1. Metz: Serpenoise. pp. 267–270. ISBN 2-87692-569-9.
