= Piennes =

- Commune
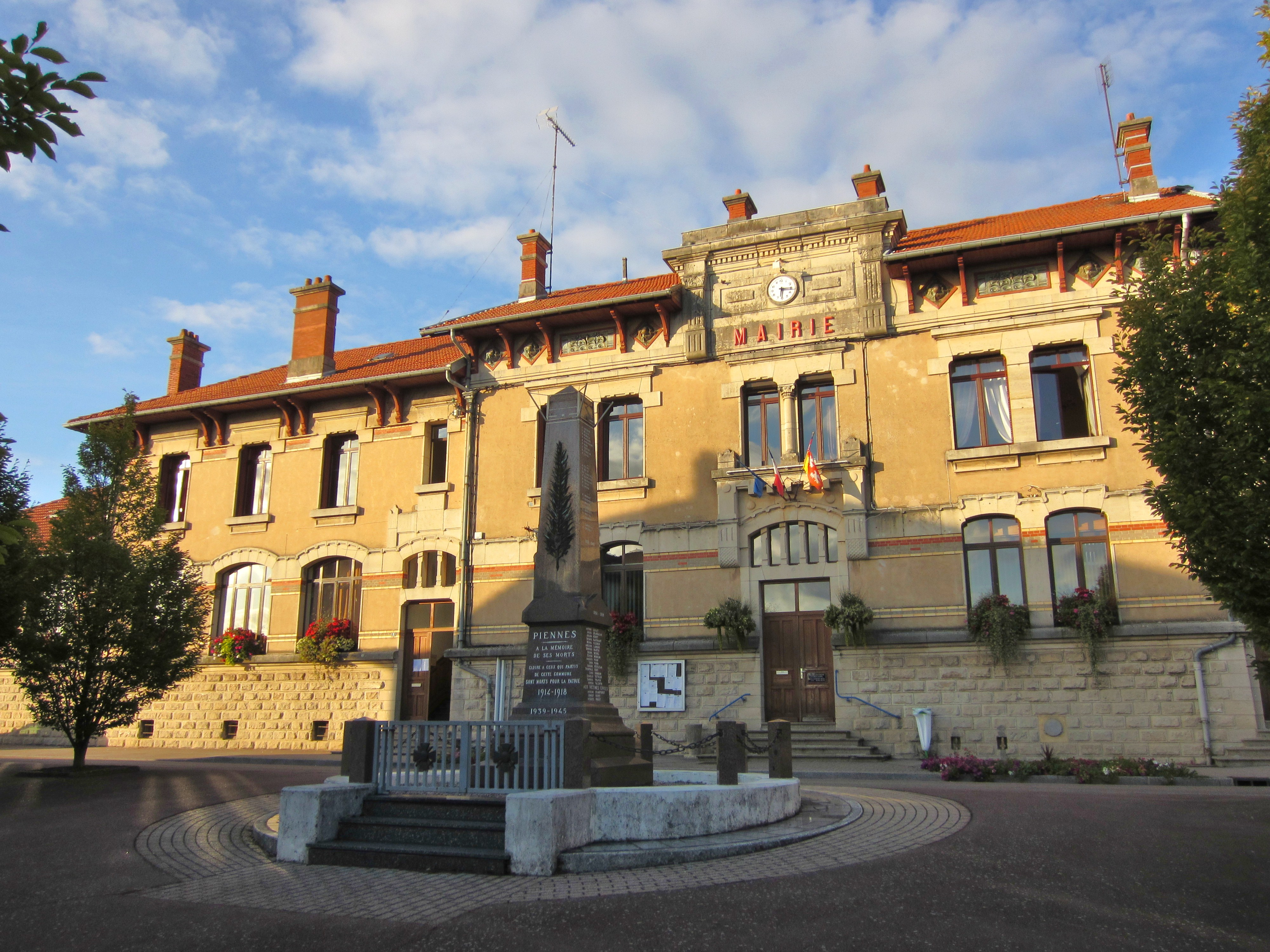
- The town hall in Piennes

- Coat of arms
- Location of Piennes
- Location within France Location within Grand Est
- Coordinates: 49°18′26″N 5°47′14″E
- Country: France
- Region: Grand Est
- Department: Meurthe-et-Moselle
- Arrondissement: Val-de-Briey
- Canton: Pays de Briey
- Intercommunality: CC Cœur du Pays-Haut

Government
  - Mayor (2020–2026): Matthieu Calvo
- Area^{1}: 4.67 km^{2} (1.80 sq mi)
- Elevation: 308 m (1,010 ft)
- Highest elevation: 326 m (1,070 ft)
- Lowest elevation: 277 m (909 ft)
- Population (2023): 2,441
  - Density: 523/km^{2} (1,350/sq mi)
- Time zone: UTC+01:00 (CET)
  - Summer (DST): UTC+02:00 (CEST)
- INSEE/Postal code: 54425 /54490
- ^{1} French Land Register data, which excludes lakes, ponds, glaciers > 1 km^{2} (0.386 sq mi or 247 acres) and river estuaries.

Piennes (French pronunciation: [pjɛn]) is a commune in the Meurthe-et-Moselle department in north-eastern France. The writer Anne-Marie Blanc winner of the 1978 Prix Erckmann-Chatrian was born in Piennes on 16 December 1931. Christiane Martel, Miss Universe 1953 was born in Piennes in 1938.

== Population ==
Historical population
Year	Pop.	±% p.a.
1968	3,559	—
1975	3,032	−2.26%
1982	2,751	−1.38%
1990	2,388	−1.75%
1999	2,416	+0.13%
2007	2,442	+0.13%
2012	2,478	+0.29%
2017	2,498	+0.16%
2023	2,441	−0.38%
Source: INSEE

== See also ==
- Communes of the Meurthe-et-Moselle department
