= Saint-Hilaire-sous-Romilly =

Commune in Grand Est, France

- Commune
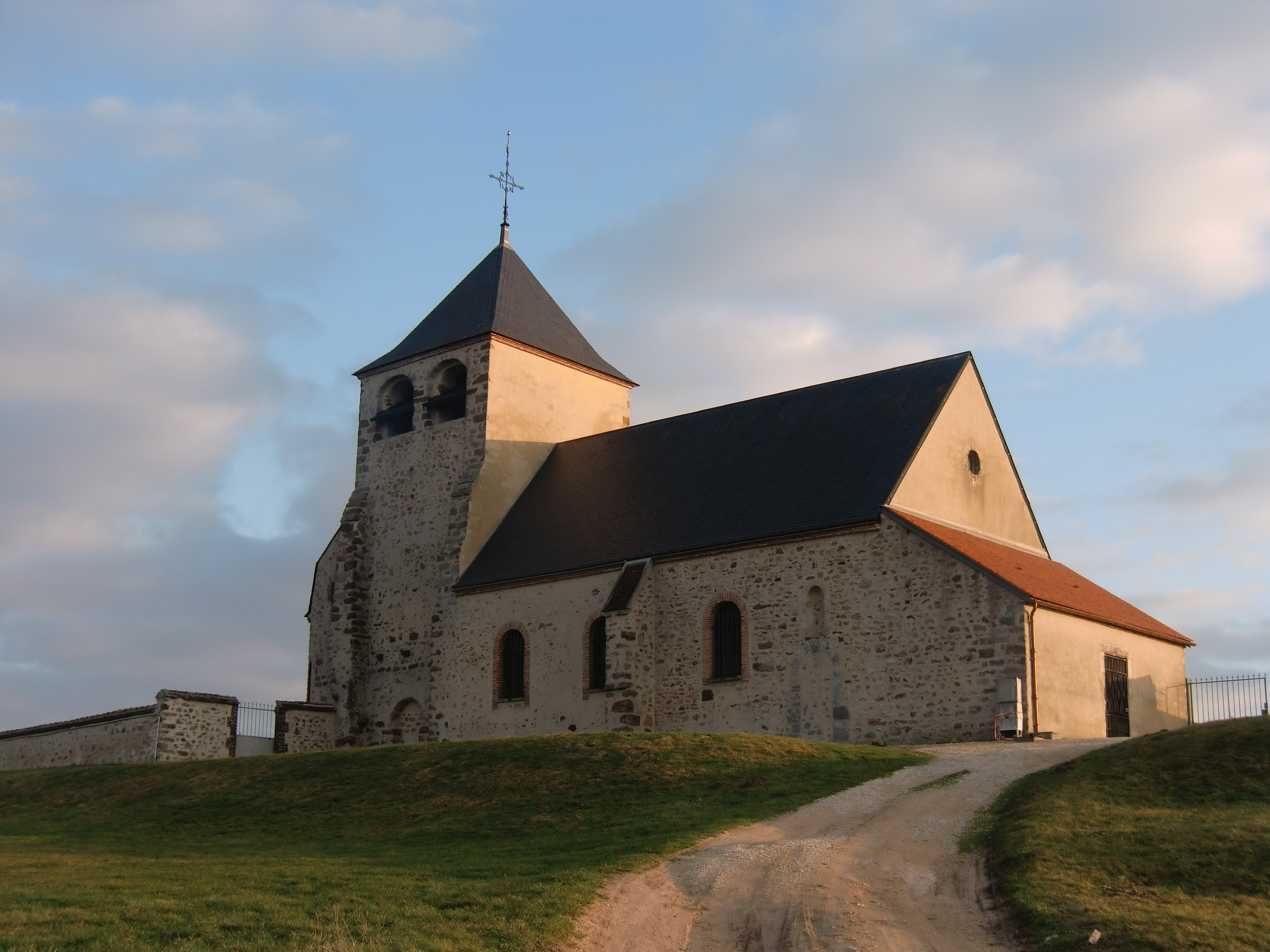
- The church in Saint-Hilaire-sous-Romilly
- Location of Saint-Hilaire-sous-Romilly
- Location within France Location within Grand Est
- Coordinates: 48°31′02″N 3°39′18″E
- Country: France
- Region: Grand Est
- Department: Aube
- Arrondissement: Nogent-sur-Seine
- Canton: Romilly-sur-Seine
- Intercommunality: Portes de Romilly-sur-Seine

Government
  - Mayor (2020–2026): Francesco Lo Briglio
- Area^{1}: 20.2 km^{2} (7.8 sq mi)
- Elevation: 105 m (344 ft)
- Population (2023): 331
  - Density: 16.4/km^{2} (42.4/sq mi)
- Time zone: UTC+01:00 (CET)
  - Summer (DST): UTC+02:00 (CEST)
- INSEE/Postal code: 10341 /10100
- ^{1} French Land Register data, which excludes lakes, ponds, glaciers > 1 km^{2} (0.386 sq mi or 247 acres) and river estuaries.

Saint-Hilaire-sous-Romilly (French pronunciation: [sɛ̃.t‿ilɛʁ su ʁɔmiji], literally Saint-Hilaire under Romilly) is a commune in the Aube department in north-central France.

== Population ==
Historical population
Year	Pop.	±% p.a.
1968	259	—
1975	289	+1.58%
1982	318	+1.38%
1990	347	+1.10%
1999	333	−0.46%
2007	378	+1.60%
2012	331	−2.62%
2017	351	+1.18%
2023	331	−0.97%
Source: INSEE

== See also ==
- Communes of the Aube department
