= Prix Vérité =

French Literary Award

The prix Vérité is a French literary award bestowed by the commune of Le Cannet in the Alpes-Maritimes department of southeastern France..

Established in 1986 by Michèle Tabarot, the prize rewards each year a book about a contemporary event based on one or more personally experienced facts. The prize is awarded by a jury composed of journalists, senior reporters, writers and former laureates

It places special emphasis on exceptional men and women, witnesses of the great events of our time, with an unconditional conviction or determination to fulfill their commitments.

== Liste of winners ==
=== 2009 ===
- Prix Vérité: Jean-Louis Bruguière: Ce que je n’ai pas pu dire, Robert Laffont, ISBN 9782221114247
- Prix spécial du Jury Prix Vérité: Hélène Mercier-Arnault Au fil des notes. Plon, ISBN 2259205372

=== 2007 ===
- Prix Vérité: May Chidiac and Amal Moghaizel: Le ciel m'attendra. - Éditions Florent Massot
- Prix spécial du Jury Prix Vérité: Íngrid Betancourt and Lionel Duroy: La Rage au cœur -

Bernard Fixot and Marcel Rufo: La Vie en désordre - Éditions Anne Carrière

=== 2006 ===
- Prix Vérité: Bernard Borrel: Un juge assassiné - Flammarion
- Prix spécial du Jury Prix Vérité: Dahina Le Guennan : Inavouable Vérité - Albin Michel

=== 2005 ===
- Prix Vérité : Somaly Mam : Le Silence de l’innocence - Éditions Anne Carrière
- Prix spécial du Jury Prix Vérité : Sediqa Massoud, Marie-Françoise Colombani and Chékéba Hachemi: Pour l’amour de Massoud - Ed XO, ISBN 2845632436
- Prix Vérité for life achievement: Patrick Poivre d’Arvor

=== 2004 ===
- Prix Vérité: Dominique Bromberger: Un aller-Retour - Robert Laffont
- Prix Ville du Cannet: Esther Mujawayo et Souâd Belhaddad: SurVivantes - Editions de l’Aube

=== 2003 ===
- Prix Vérité: Mariane Pearl: Un cœur invaincu - Plon
- Prix Ville du Cannet: Jean-Marc Sylvestre: Une petite douleur à l’épaule gauche Ramsay

=== 2002 ===
- Prix Vérité: Bruno Dellinger: World Trade Center 47e étage - Robert Laffont
- Prix Ville du Cannet: Françoise Laborde : Pourquoi ma mère me rend folle - Ramsay

=== 2001 ===
- Prix Vérité: Marina Picasso : Grand-Père - Éditions Denoël
- Prix Ville du Cannet: Bruno de Stabenrath: Cavalcade - Robert Laffont

=== 2000 ===
- Prix Vérité: Laurence de la Ferrière: Seule dans le vent des glaces - Robert Laffont
- Prix Ville du Cannet: Jean-Jacques Le Garrec: Évasions - XO

=== 1999 ===
- Prix Vérité : Jacques Chancel: L’Or et le Rien - Plon
- Prix Vérité pour l’ensemble de son œuvre : Marcel Jullian

=== 1998 ===
- Prix Vérité: Maurice Herzog: L’Autre Annapurna - Robert Laffont
- Prix Ville du Cannet: Jean Bertolino : La Frontière des Fous - Flammarion

=== 1997 ===
- Prix Vérité: Thierry Jean-Pierre - Crédit lyonnais : l’enquête - Bernard Fixot
- Prix spécial du Jury: Florence Schaal : Recherche enfant passionnément - JC Lattès

=== 1994 ===
- Prix Vérité: Emmanuelle Laborit : Le Cri de la mouette - Robert Laffont
- Prix spécial du Jury: Claire Sterling : Pax mafiosa - Robert Laffont

=== 1993 ===
- Prix Vérité: David Bisson in collaboration with Evangéline de Schonen : L’Enfant derrière la porte - Éditions Grasset
- Prix spécial du Jury: Sœur Jacques Marie : Henri Matisse la Chapelle de Vence - Ed. Grégoire Gardette

=== 1992 ===
- Prix Vérité: Tracy Chamoun : Au nom du père - JC Lattès
- Prix spécial du Jury - Jean-François Deniau : Ce que je crois - Grasset

=== 1991 ===
- Prix Vérité: Béatrice Saubin : L’Épreuve - Robert Laffont
- Prix spécial du Jury: Alain Woodrow : Information manipulation - Ed. du Félin

=== 1990 ===
- Prix Vérité: Christiane Collange : Moi ta fille - Fayard
- Prix spécial du Jury: Michel Castex : Un mensonge gros comme le siècle - Albin Michel

=== 1989 ===
- Prix Vérité: Alain Louyot : Gosses de guerre - Robert Laffont
- Prix spécial du Jury: Pierre Richard : Un petit blond dans un grand parc - Olivier Orban

=== 1988 ===
- Prix Vérité: Roger Auque and Patrick Forestier : Un otage à Beyrouth - Filipacchi
- Prix spécial du Jury: José Luis de Vilallonga: Ma vie est une fête - Olivier Orban

=== 1987 ===
- Prix Vérité: Yves Salgues : L’Héroïne - JC Lattès

=== 1986 ===
- Prix Vérité: Dominique Lapierre : La Cité de la Joie - Robert Laffont
