= Pars-lès-Romilly =

Commune in Grand Est, France

- Commune
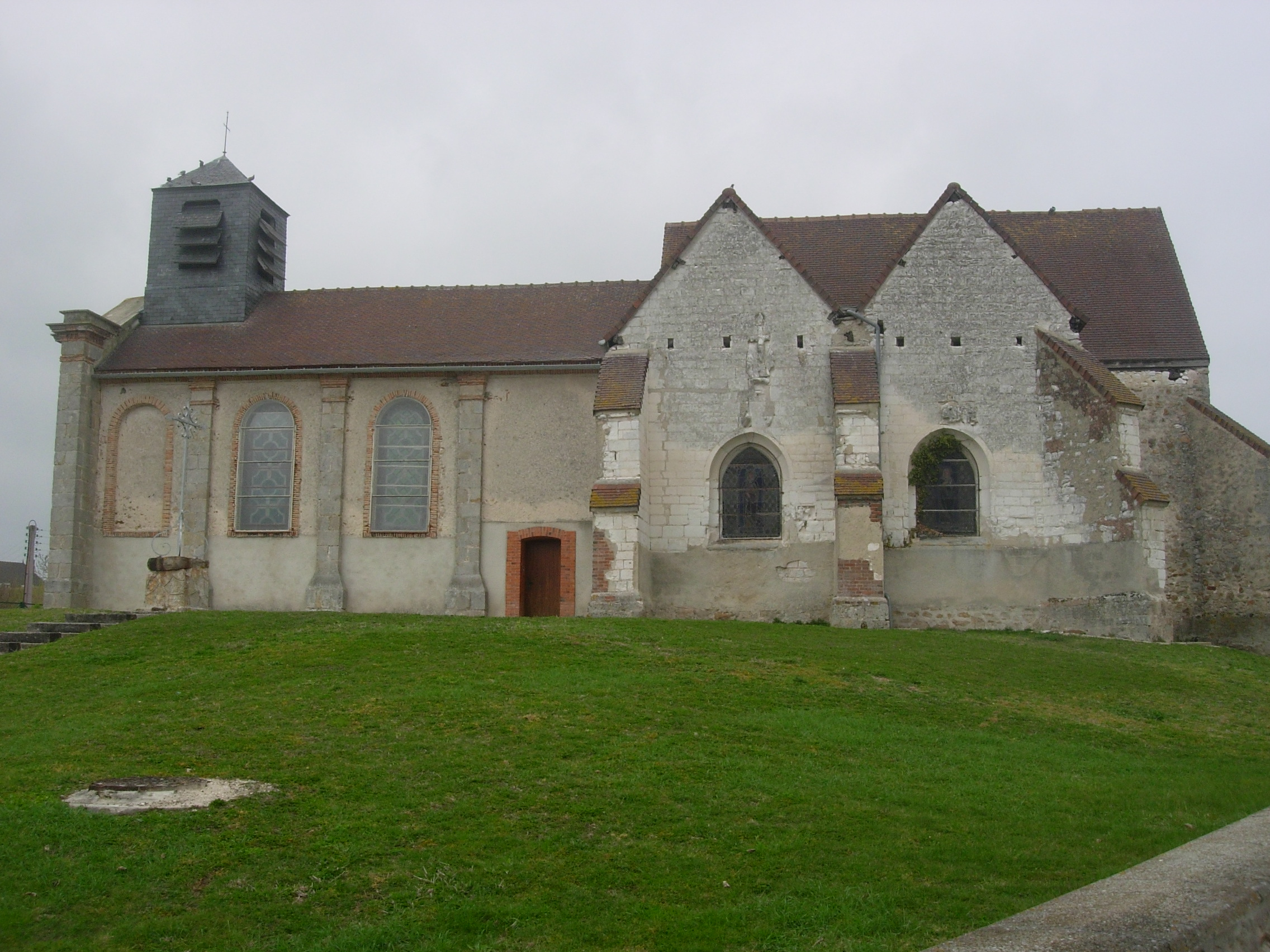
- The church in Pars-lès-Romilly

- Coat of arms
- Location of Pars-lès-Romilly
- Location within France Location within Grand Est
- Coordinates: 48°29′13″N 3°43′57″E
- Country: France
- Region: Grand Est
- Department: Aube
- Arrondissement: Nogent-sur-Seine
- Canton: Romilly-sur-Seine
- Intercommunality: Portes de Romilly-sur-Seine

Government
  - Mayor (2020–2026): Marianne Joly
- Area^{1}: 17.88 km^{2} (6.90 sq mi)
- Elevation: 75 m (246 ft)
- Population (2023): 845
  - Density: 47.3/km^{2} (122/sq mi)
- Time zone: UTC+01:00 (CET)
  - Summer (DST): UTC+02:00 (CEST)
- INSEE/Postal code: 10280 /10100
- ^{1} French Land Register data, which excludes lakes, ponds, glaciers > 1 km^{2} (0.386 sq mi or 247 acres) and river estuaries.

Pars-lès-Romilly (French pronunciation: [paʁ lɛ ʁɔmiji], literally Pars near Romilly) is a commune in the Aube department in north-central France.

== Population ==
Historical population
Year	Pop.	±% p.a.
1968	406	—
1975	678	+7.60%
1982	714	+0.74%
1990	713	−0.02%
1999	684	−0.46%
2007	756	+1.26%
2012	801	+1.16%
2017	824	+0.57%
2023	845	+0.42%
Source: INSEE

== See also ==
- Communes of the Aube department
