= Caffier =

Caffier (pronounced [kafje]) is a French surname which, as a result of the asylum granted by Lutheran states in Germany to Huguenot refugees in the 17th and 18th century, is also to be found as a rare family name in Germany. Notable people with this name include:

- Lorenz Caffier (born 1954), German politician
- Michel Caffier (1930–2021), French journalist, writer and literary critic
