= Gélannes =

Commune in Grand Est, France

- Commune
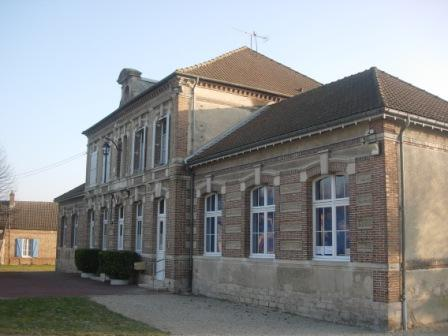
- The town hall in Gélannes

- Coat of arms
- Location of Gélannes
- Location within France Location within Grand Est
- Coordinates: 48°29′03″N 3°40′22″E
- Country: France
- Region: Grand Est
- Department: Aube
- Arrondissement: Nogent-sur-Seine
- Canton: Romilly-sur-Seine
- Intercommunality: Portes de Romilly-sur-Seine

Government
  - Mayor (2020–2026): Richard Begon
- Area^{1}: 12.13 km^{2} (4.68 sq mi)
- Elevation: 75 m (246 ft)
- Population (2023): 694
  - Density: 57.2/km^{2} (148/sq mi)
- Time zone: UTC+01:00 (CET)
  - Summer (DST): UTC+02:00 (CEST)
- INSEE/Postal code: 10164 /10100
- ^{1} French Land Register data, which excludes lakes, ponds, glaciers > 1 km^{2} (0.386 sq mi or 247 acres) and river estuaries.

Gélannes (French pronunciation: [ʒelan]) is a commune in the Aube department in the Grand Est region in north-central France.

== Population ==
Historical population
Year	Pop.	±% p.a.
1968	480	—
1975	510	+0.87%
1982	625	+2.95%
1990	662	+0.72%
1999	706	+0.72%
2007	726	+0.35%
2012	730	+0.11%
2017	736	+0.16%
2023	694	−0.97%
Source: INSEE

== See also ==
- Communes of the Aube department
