= Anne-Marie Blanc (writer) =

French writer (1931–2022)

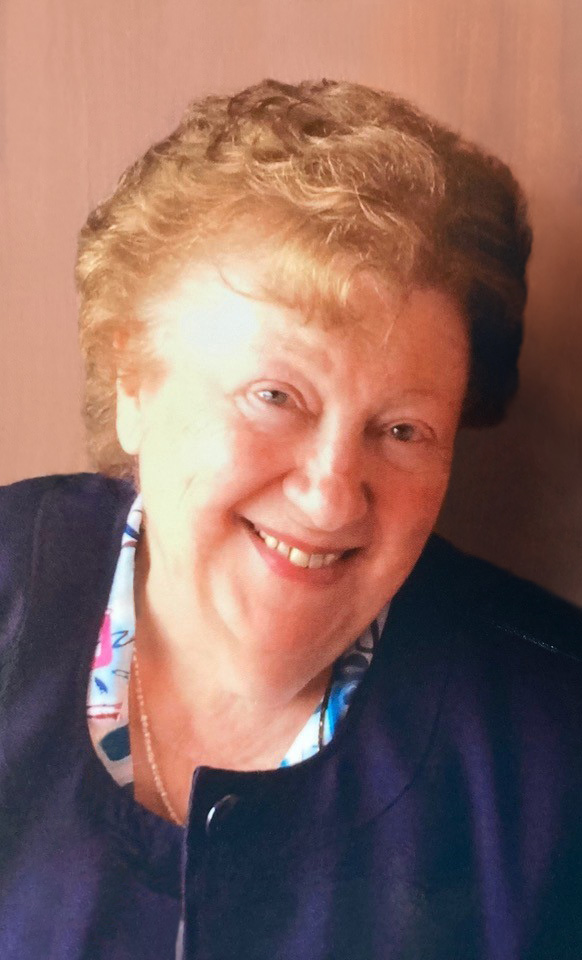
Anne-Marie Blanc

Anna Maria Snider (16 December 1931 – 15 December 2022), better known as Anne-Marie Blanc, was a French writer. Her first novel, Marie-Romaine, won the Prix Erckmann-Chatrian in 1978. Blanc was born in Piennes on 16 December 1931, and died in Castres on 15 December 2022, one day before her 91st birthday.

== Works ==
- 1978: Marie-Romaine, novel, 1990 ISBN 2-901647-98-7.
- 1991: Le Bassin de Landres : Baroncourt, Bouligny, Joudreville, Landres, Piennes, collective work under the direction of Anne-Marie Blanc, ISBN 2-9505790-0-0.
- 1991: Pays-Haut, ISBN 2-87692-015-8.
- 2002: Pays-Haut, dits et récits 1939-1989, volume 2, La Parenthèse, ISBN 978-2876925564.
