= Hélène Gestern =

French writer (born 1971)

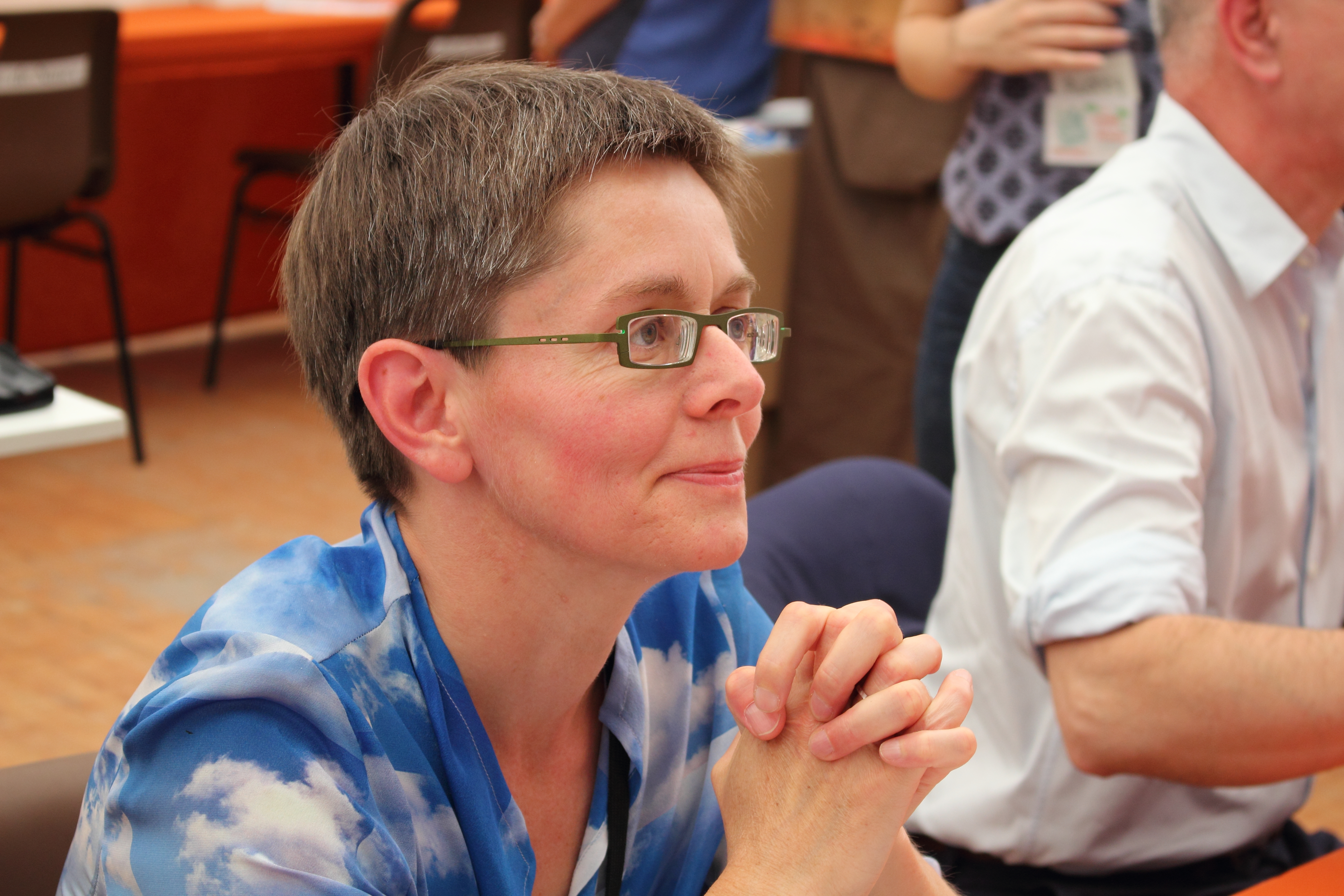
Image of Hélène Gestern

Hélène Gestern (born 1971) is a French writer. One of her favorite themes is photography, and the power it exercises over memory.

== Works ==
- 2011: Eux sur la photo (English title, The People in the Photo), Arléa, Coup de cœur des lycéens de Monaco 2012, Prix René Fallet 2012 and Cezam Prix Littéraire Inter CE
- 2013: Le Chat (short story, Émoticourt)
- 2013: La Part du feu, Arléa, prix littéraire des Lycéens d'île-de-France
- 2014: Portrait d'après blessure, Arléa, Prix Erckmann-Chatrian and prix Culture et Bibliothèques pour Tous
- 2016: L'Odeur de la forêt, Arléa, Feuille d'or de la ville de Nancy
- 2017: Un vertige, Arléa
- 2018: L'Eau qui dort, Arléa
- 2020: Armen, Arléa
- 2022: 555, Arléa
- 2024: Cézembre, Grasset
