= Maria Pourchet =

French novelist

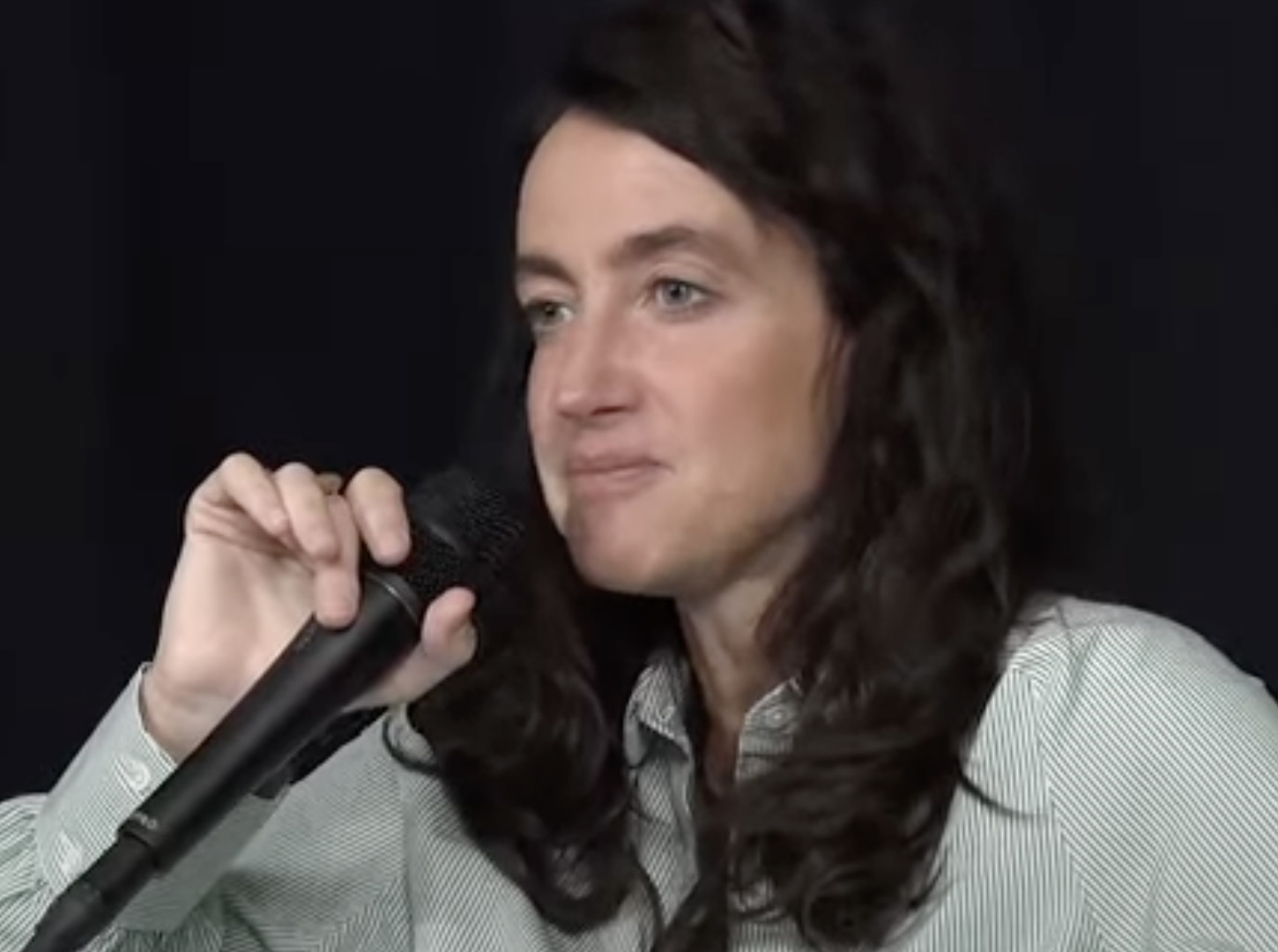
Maria Pourchet

Maria Pourchet (born 5 March 1980) is a French novelist. Her novels have been published by Éditions Gallimard in the Collection Blanche. Pourchet was born in Épinal.

== Publications ==
=== Novels ===
- Avancer, novel, Gallimard, Collection Blanche, 2012 ISBN 9782070137121
- Rome en un jour, novel, Gallimard, Collection Blanche, 2013 ISBN 9782070142163 ; "Folio" n° 6057, 2015 ISBN 9782070468140 Prix Erckmann-Chatrian 2013.
- Champion, novel, Gallimard, Collection Blanche, 2015 ISBN 9782070148646
- Toutes les femmes sauf une, Éditions Pauvert, September 2018 ISBN 9782213699134
- Les Impatients, novel, Gallimard, Collection Blanche
- Western novel, Stock, 2023

=== Short stories ===
- La 206, in La Nouvelle Revue française (n° 618), Gallimard, May 2016 ISBN 9782070183739

=== Other publications (collective works) ===
- Les Conditions de la création littéraire under the direction of Maria Pourchet and Audrey Alvès, L’Harmattan, 2011 ISBN 9782296139114
- With Sylvie Ducas, Comment le livre vient au lecteur : la prescription littéraire à l’heure de l’hyperchoix et du numérique, in Communication et Langages, Armand Colin, Paris, 2014
