= Noyant-d'Allier =

- Commune
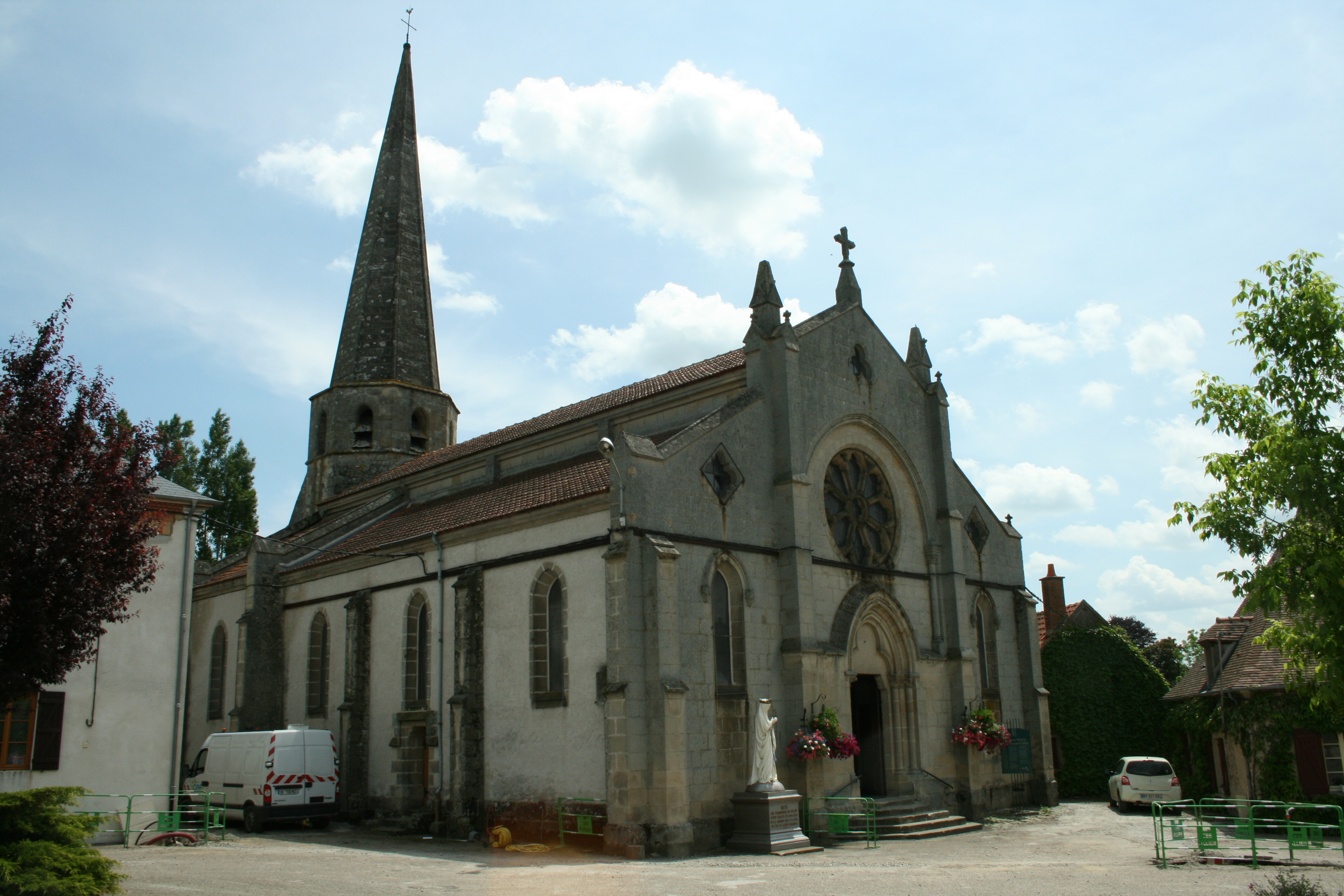
- The church in Noyant
- Location of Noyant-d'Allier
- Location within France Location within Auvergne-Rhône-Alpes
- Coordinates: 46°28′49″N 3°07′27″E
- Country: France
- Region: Auvergne-Rhône-Alpes
- Department: Allier
- Arrondissement: Moulins
- Canton: Souvigny
- Intercommunality: Bocage Bourbonnais

Government
  - Mayor (2026–32): Frédéric Fusil
- Area^{1}: 21.05 km^{2} (8.13 sq mi)
- Elevation: 400 m (1,300 ft)
- Highest elevation: 485 m (1,591 ft)
- Lowest elevation: 247 m (810 ft)
- Population (2023): 602
  - Density: 28.6/km^{2} (74.1/sq mi)
- Time zone: UTC+01:00 (CET)
  - Summer (DST): UTC+02:00 (CEST)
- INSEE/Postal code: 03202 /03210
- ^{1} French Land Register data, which excludes lakes, ponds, glaciers > 1 km^{2} (0.386 sq mi or 247 acres) and river estuaries.

Noyant-d'Allier (French pronunciation: [nwajɑ̃ dalje]) is a commune in the Allier department in Auvergne in central France. The writer Jeanne Cressanges (born in 1929) is a native from Noyant-d'Allier. This is the first neighbourhood in France where many Vietnamese people officially settle down. Most of Vietnamese people there were born in France of full or partially Vietnamese descent.

== Population ==
Historical population
Year	Pop.	±% p.a.
1968	1,733	—
1975	1,337	−3.64%
1982	1,091	−2.86%
1990	921	−2.10%
1999	820	−1.28%
2007	707	−1.84%
2012	681	−0.75%
2017	627	−1.64%
2023	602	−0.68%
Source: INSEE

== See also ==
- Communes of the Allier department
