= Gaston-Paul Effa =

Cameroonian-French writer and philosopher

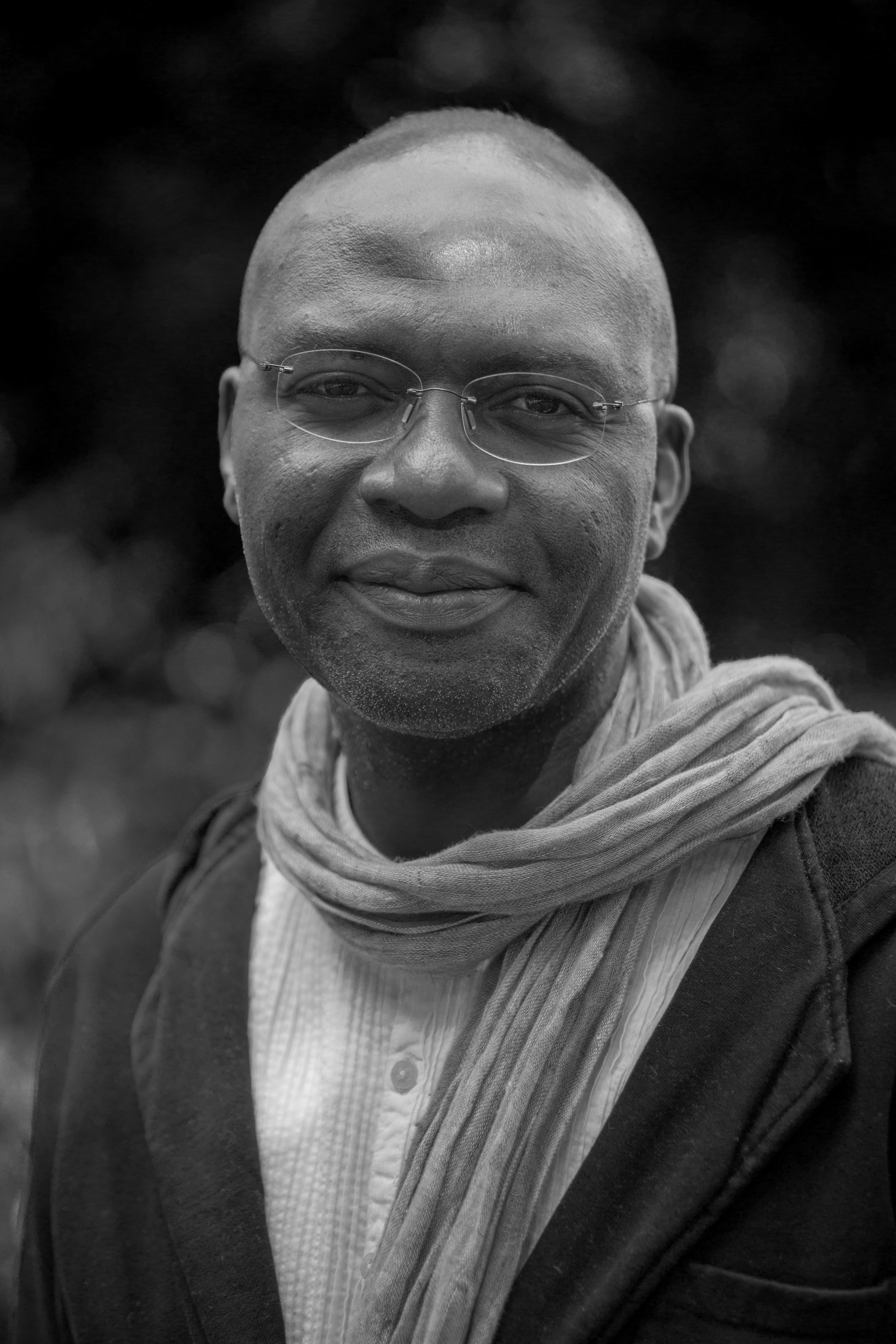
Gaston-Paul Effa in 2015

Gaston-Paul Effa (born 1965, Yaoundé) is a writer from Lorraine of Cameroonian origin, also a professor of philosophy.

He came to France to attend secondary school at the Collège épiscopal Saint-Étienne in Strasbourg, then studied theology and philosophy at the university. He is professor of philosophy at Lycée Mangin of Sarrebourg.

== Works ==
- 1996: Tout ce bleu, Éditions Grasset
- 1998: Mâ, Grasset
- 2000: Le cri que tu pousses ne réveillera personne, Éditions Gallimard
- 2000: Icône, sanctuaire de la présence
- 2001: Cheval-roi, Éditions du Rocher
- 2003: Le Juif et l'Africain : double offrande (in collaboration with Gabriel Attias), éditions du Rocher
- 2003: Le livre de l'alliance (in collaboration with André Chouraqui), Sofédis
- 2303: Yaoundé instantanés, Éditions du Laquet
- 2004: La salle des professeurs, Éd. du Rocher
- 2004: Cette langue est bien ce feu, Éd. du Laquet
- 2005: Voici le dernier jour du monde, Éd. du Rocher
- 2006: À la vitesse d'un baiser sur la peau, A. Carrière
- 2008: Nous, enfants de la tradition, A. Carrière
- 2012: Je la voulais lointaine, Actes Sud
- 2015: Rendez-vous avec l'heure qui blesse, Gallimard
- 2015: Le dieu perdu dans l'herbe, Presses du Châtelet
- 2015: Sous l'apaisante clarté, poems. in collaboration with Jean-Philippe Goetz; photographs by Nelly Playa, Tertium éditions

== Distinctions ==
- Prix Erckmann-Chatrian (le « Goncourt lorrain »), 1998
- Grand prix littéraire d'Afrique noire, 1998.
- Prix de Littérature de l'Académie rhénane, 2012 in Strasbourg

== See also ==
- Culture of Cameroon

== Bibliography ==
- Adele King, « Bilingualism, diasporas, and Afro-Parisians », Journal of Postcolonial Writing, vol. 40, n° 2, 2004, p. 126-130
- Patricia-Pia Célerier, "Gaston-Paul Effa : essentialisation d’une écriture camerounaise", Fès, 1999
- "Des influences occidentale et africaine dans les romans de Gaston-Paul Effa", in Pádraig Ó Gormaile, La rencontre des cultures dans la littérature européenne contemporaine, Association européenne François Mauriac, 2002, p. 157 et suiv. ISBN 295174790X
- Odile Marie Cazenave, Afrique sur Seine : une nouvelle génération de romanciers africains à Paris, L'Harmattan, 2003, 311 p. ISBN 2747544559
- Bruno Essard-Budail, Jean-Ferdinand Tchoutouo and Fernando d'Almeida (dir.), "Gaston-Paul Effa", in Anthologie de la littérature camerounaise : des origines à nos jours, Afrédit, Yaoundé, 2007, p. 223 ISBN 9956-428-14-0
