= Claude Kévers-Pascalis =

Belgian writer, historian and engineer

Claude Kévers-Pascalis (1920 – 3 February 2016) was a Belgian writer, historian and engineer.

== Career as engineer ==
A graduate from the École centrale Paris and the Institut français de contrôle de gestion, he worked as a consulting engineer in Paris before he joined Nancy where he spent the rest of his career. He was responsible for security checks, in particular of nuclear power plant boilers.

== Distinctions ==
Claude Kévers-Pascalis was an officier of the National Order of Merit; Crésus received the Feuille d'or de la ville de Nancy of the Livre sur la place; Saint Nicolas citoyen romain, the Prix Erckmann-Chatrian in 1995 and Saint Nicolas the literary prize of the Departmental councils of Lorraine.

== Works ==
- 1986: Crésus. Buchet/Chastel. 1989. ISBN 978-2864803911.
- 1989: L'œil du Roi. Le Cerf. 1989. ISBN 978-2204031882.
- 1992: Le songe de Pharaon. Belfond. ISBN 978-2714429544.
- 1995: Saint Nicolas citoyen romain. Editions Serpenoise. ISBN 978-2876921948.
- 2002: Saint Nicolas : Légende ou histoire ?. Editions Serpenoise. ISBN 978-2876925649.
- Nordon 1904-2004 cent ans au service de l'industrie. Groupe Fives Lille. ASIN B004VLYHQW.
- 2005 De Liège à Nancy, sur les pas du Téméraire. Gérard Louis. ISBN 978-2914554534.
- 2010: Un traître à la Cour, Paroles de Lorrains, ISBN 978-2918073093

=== Participation to collective works ===
- 2006: Simone Collin, Hubert Collin and Claude Kevers-Pascalis. Saint Nicolas des Lorrains à Rome;Chronique d'une renaissance. Serge Domini. ISBN 978-2354750114.
