= Canton of Romilly-sur-Seine =

Coordinates: 48.52°N 3.73°E

- Canton
- Situation of the canton of Romilly-sur-Seine in the department of Aube
- Country: France
- Region: Grand Est
- Department: Aube
- No. of communes: {{{nbcomm}}}
- Population (2023): 19,048
- INSEE code: 1009

The canton of Romilly-sur-Seine is an administrative division of the Aube department, northeastern France. It was created at the French canton reorganisation which came into effect in March 2015. Its seat is in Romilly-sur-Seine.

It consists of the following communes:

1. Crancey
2. Gélannes
3. Maizières-la-Grande-Paroisse
4. Pars-lès-Romilly
5. Romilly-sur-Seine
6. Saint-Hilaire-sous-Romilly
