= Michel Picard (writer) =

French professor, writer and literary critic

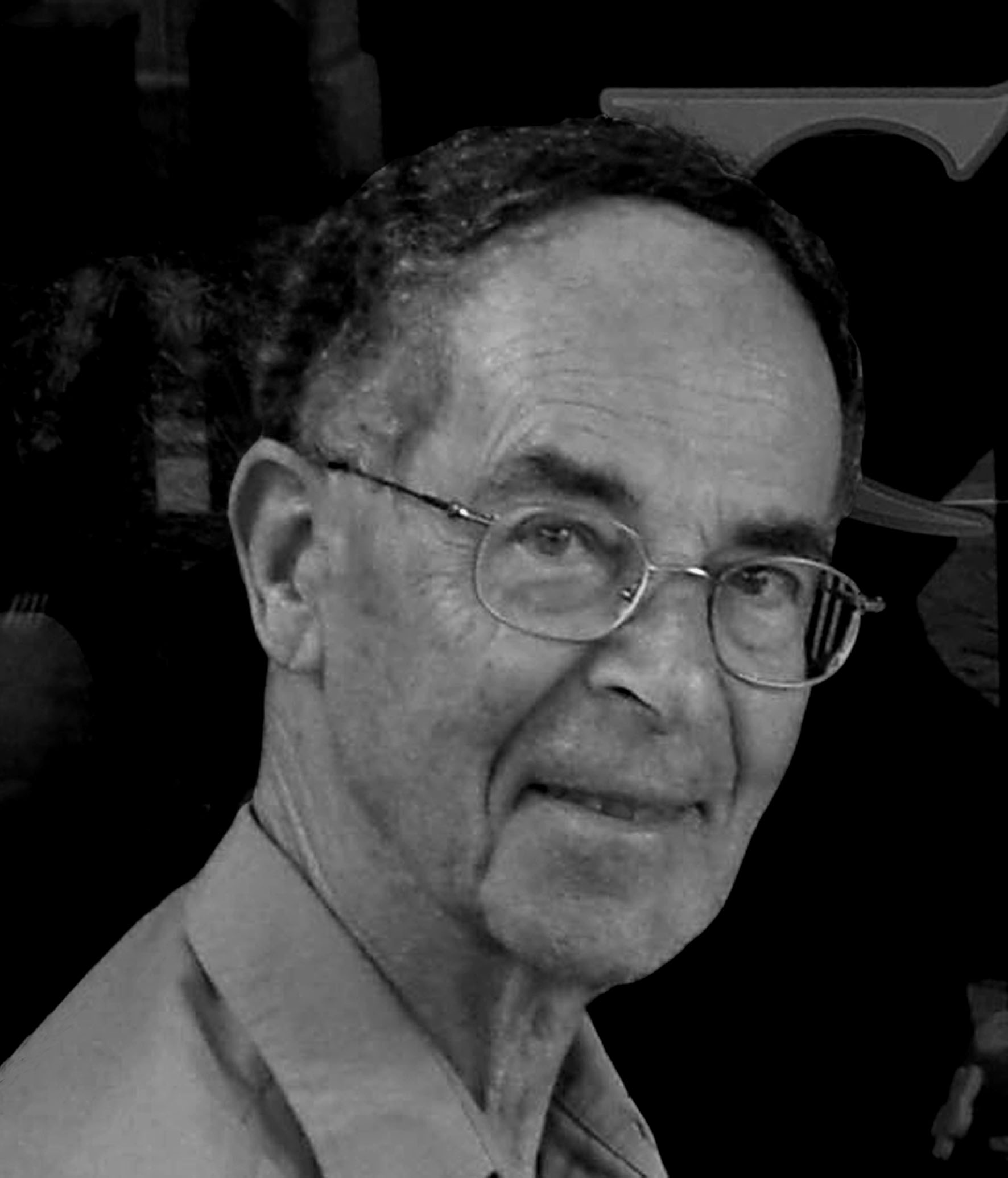
Michel Picard, juillet 2018

Michel Picard (born 15 August 1931 in Nancy) is a French professor, writer and literary critic.

== Biography ==
A novelist, essayist, academic, Michel Picard published at a very young age (under pseudonym) two novels at Gallimard and collaborated regularly with the Nouvelle Revue française. He was born in Nancy, where he studied and taught, first at the École Normale d'Institutrices, then at the Faculty of Letters. Agrégé de Lettres, he supported in January 1971 at the Sorbonne a Doctorate thesis which aroused interest and controversy, both for the chosen work, that of Roger Vailland, and for the method adopted.

Hence a defense account in Le Monde, the rapid publication of the thesis, one or two violent attacks and several complimentary articles (including two pages by Étiemble in Le Nouvel Observateur). Elected a professor the same year at the University of Reims, he spent thirteen years as director of the Department of French. In 1986, he published La lecture comme jeu ("Reading as a Game") and then, in 1989, Lire le temps ("Reading Time"), an essay in which he analyzed literature not as an object (library, volume or "text"), but as an "Activity"- this being not writing but reading, some sort of reading, fully definable as a game. In 2002, La Tentation will extend the thesis to art in general, starting from the famous engraving of Jacques Callot. However, joining practice to theory, he pursued his work as novelist and published four novels in recent years, one of which, notably, "Matantemma", attracted the attention of the critics and obtained the Feuille d'or de la ville de Nancy prize.

== Bibliography: main publications ==
=== Novels ===
- 1997: Freud à Nancy, Autrement (series "Littératures"), ISBN 2862606898
- 2005: À Pierre fendre, Autrement (series "Littératures"), ISBN 2746705966
- 2007: Matantemma, Buchet/Chastel, ISBN 2283022908, Feuille d'or de la ville de Nancy
- 2009: La cata, Buchet/Chastel, ISBN 2283023769

=== Essays ===
- 1972: Libertinage et tragique – L'œuvre de Roger Vailland, Hachette-Littérature.
- 1986: La lecture comme jeu – essai sur la littérature, Éditions de Minuit (series "Critique").
- 1989: Lire le temps, Éditions de Minuit (series 'Critique")
- 1992: Loup, y es-tu ? (Nodier, "La fée aux miettes"), P.U.F. (series "Le texte rêve")
- 1995: La littérature et la mort, P.U.F. (series "Écriture")
- 2002: La Tentation – essai sur l'art comme jeu, Jacqueline Chambon (series "series")

=== With collaborators ===
- 1987: La lecture littéraire, Clancier-Guénaud
- 1990: Lecture de Roger Vailland, Klincksieck
- 1994: Comment la littérature agit-elle ? Klincksieck
