= Béatrice Saubin =

French author formerly imprisoned in Malaysia

- Born: 7 September 1959; Troyes, France
- Died: 2 November 2007 (aged 48); Paris, France
- Known for: First foreign national to be sentenced to death in Malaysia for drug smuggling
- Notable work: L'Épreuve (My Ordeal), 1991

Béatrice Saubin (7 September 1959 – 2 November 2007) was a French woman convicted of drug smuggling in Malaysia who later wrote a best-selling book about her prison experiences. Raised by her grandmother in Romilly-sur-Seine, she dropped out of high school and travelled to Thailand, then Malaysia, having affairs with men in each country. Her Malaysian lover in Penang offered to marry her if she met him in Zürich. At age 20, in January 1980, she was detained at Penang International Airport when an airport x-ray scanner detected 534 grams (1.177 lb) of pure grade heroin hidden in her suitcase.

While she claimed that her Malaysian lover had set her up, the Malaysian High Court rejected her story and sentenced her to death by hanging in June 1982. She was the first foreign national to be sentenced to death under Malaysia's strict drug trafficking law passed in 1976. Following a public outcry in France, the High Court reduced her sentence to life imprisonment in August 1982. During her years of incarceration, she learned Malay and Cantonese and worked on behalf of inmates in the prison hospital. She was released in 1990 for good conduct. She authored L'Épreuve (My Ordeal) (1991) about her prison experiences, and Quand la Porte S'Ouvre (When the Door Opens) (1995) about her return to freedom.

== Early life ==
Béatrice Saubin was born on 7 September 1959, in Troyes, France. She was the product of a liaison between her mother, Josette, a prostitute, and Sylvestre Saubin, a soldier. Her mother gave her over to the care of her mother, Marguerite, who raised Saubin in the commune of Romilly-sur-Seine. Saubin chafed at her grandmother's strictness and began hitchhiking at the age of 16 to reach places as far away as Beirut. Dropping out of high school, she travelled to Pakistan and Thailand, became engaged to a Thai man, ran out of money, and returned home to France, where she started working as a secretary. Returning to Thailand and not finding her fiancé, she travelled to Malaysia where she met a Malaysian named Eddie Tan Kim Soo. She and Tan conducted their trysts at the Eastern & Oriental Hotel. Tan promised to marry her if she would meet him in Zürich. On 27 January 1980, Saubin went to Penang International Airport to catch a flight to Switzerland.

== Drug smuggling conviction ==
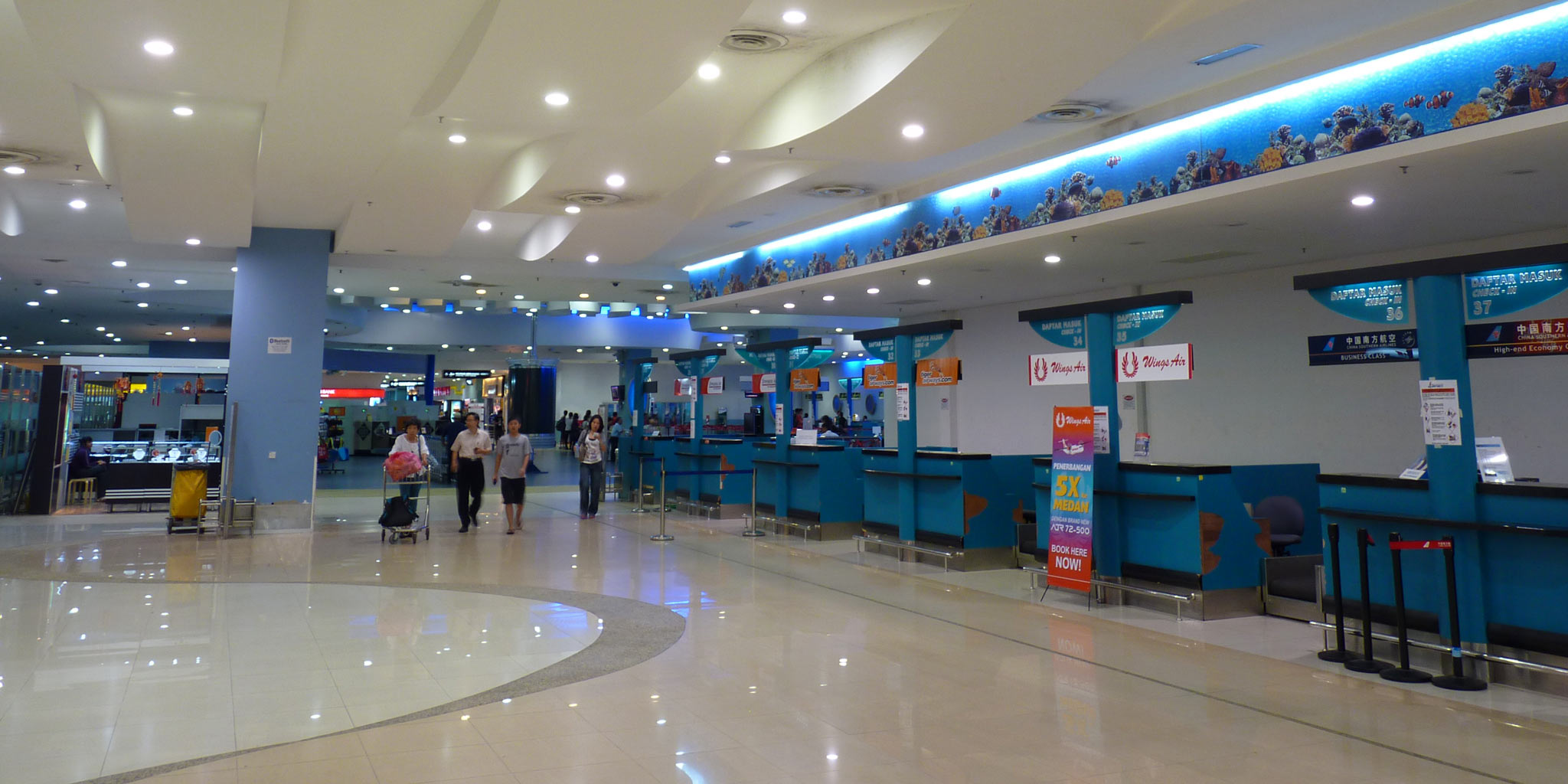
Check-in counters at Penang International Airport

When Saubin's green Samsonite suitcase was put through the airport x-ray scanner upon check-in, officials discovered 22 packets containing 534 grams (1.177 lb) of pure grade heroin with a street value of over RM300,000 hidden in the lining. Saubin was arraigned before a Malaysian judge on charges of drug smuggling, as the government claimed she was planning to sell the heroin in France. Saubin denied the charges and any knowledge of the drugs. She said the suitcase had been given to her by Tan, and that he must have put the heroin inside it. The judge did not accept her story and doubted the existence of Tan. He ordered Saubin placed in solitary confinement until an appeal would be heard.

In the appeal hearing on 17 June 1982, Justice Datuk Bigley Lee Tian Huat of the Penang High Court sentenced Saubin to death by hanging. She was the first foreign national to be sentenced to death under Malaysia's strict drug trafficking law, which had been adopted in 1976. According to the law, anyone in possession of more than 100 grams (0.22 lb) of heroin or morphine was subject to the death sentence or life imprisonment. Saubin's Malaysian attorney, K. Kumaraendran, who had defended other accused drug traffickers, filed an appeal. He did not allow her to plead guilty in exchange for the prosecution's offer of a life sentence with parole, since she had stated she was innocent.

Saubin continued to maintain her innocence and garnered favourable public opinion both in France and Malaysia, where many locals believed her sentence to be too harsh. Saubin's grandmother flew to Malaysia to support her. Saubin's case was publicised by French television and Le Journal du Dimanche launched a petition calling for her release which was signed by prominent French doctors, professors, writers, and entertainers.

Responding to the public pressure, on 25 August 1982, the Malaysian High Court reduced Saubin's sentence to life imprisonment. The court stated that the evidence had not changed, but "extenuating circumstances" justified a reduction of the sentence. The court noted that its decision should not be cited as precedent. In fact, the following year in another drug trafficking case, the High Court upgraded a life imprisonment sentence to a death sentence, stating that since the previous judiciary panel had not specified what the extenuating circumstances were, its life imprisonment ruling applied to Saubin's case alone. Kumaraendran, Saubin's attorney, opined that with time already spent in prison and time off for good conduct, Saubin could serve as few as eleven years.

== Prison life ==
Following the reduction of her sentence, Saubin continued to receive public support and enjoyed special privileges as a "celebrity prisoner". She was given her own 10-by-10-foot (3.0 m × 3.0 m) jail cell with a mattress, a supply of cigarettes and reading material, a cassette tape recorder, and music tapes. She also received visitors, including a French Catholic priest, a French nun, and French writer Didier Decoin, whose 1984 book Béatrice en enfer (Béatrice in Hell) blamed Saubin's conviction on judicial error.

Saubin spent her years in prison building herself intellectually and emotionally. She learned Malay and Cantonese, and developed close relationships with other women prisoners. During her last three years in prison, she worked in the prison hospital assisting other inmates.

In 1990, she was released from prison for good conduct. She emerged wearing a chador to avoid attracting attention.

== Books ==
In 1991 her book L'Épreuve (My Ordeal) was published by Éditions Robert Laffont. Filled with brutal descriptions of life in a Malaysian women's prison, it sold 170,000 copies. The book won the Prix Vérité literary award in 1991. It was translated into English as My Ordeal: Ten Years in a Malaysian Prison (1994).

In an article published in Le Point, Karen Berreby, a member of Saubin's legal team who visited her in prison on eleven occasions and interviewed her on tape for a total of 25 hours, questioned the factual accuracy of some scenes in the book. While Berreby did not dispute Saubin's suffering, she suggested that the prisoner used her intelligence and physical beauty to secure for herself better conditions than she described. Berreby said:

"Her relationship with her conditions of detention and her release is far from anything I've witnessed. The portrait, for example, of Hamidah, the director of the Penang Women's Prison, is on the verge of slander. Some witnesses from this period even paint a portrait of a pampered prisoner, who 'only had to ask the cook for lemon chicken for him to make it'. Not to mention the little Chinese girls who washed her clothes".

In 1995 Saubin published her second book, Quand la Porte S'Ouvre (When the Door Opens). This time her publisher, Éditions Robert Laffont, ordered an initial printing of only 25,000 copies, believing that an account of gaining one's freedom would sell less than Saubin's first, vivid account of prison life.

== Later life and death ==
After her release, Saubin resided in a large apartment in the 10th arrondissement of Paris. Though she had been healthy in prison, she began drinking and developed anorexia in later years. She lived on a disability pension but was eventually forced to sell her apartment. Saubin was found dead from heart failure in her home in Paris on 2 November 2007, aged 48. She was buried near her mother in Villemoyenne.

== Sources ==
- Donoghue, Tim (2014). Karpal Singh, Tiger of Jelutong: The Full Biography. Marshall Cavendish International Asia Pte Ltd. ISBN 978-9814634885.
- Mathews, Philip, ed. (2014). Chronicle of Malaysia: Fifty Years of Headline News, 1963–2013 (Revised ed.). Editions Didier Millet. ISBN 978-9671061749.
- Novack, Andrew (2016). The Global Decline of the Mandatory Death Penalty: Constitutional Jurisprudence and Legislative Reform in Africa, Asia, and the Caribbean. Routledge. ISBN 978-1317030287.
- Saubin, Béatrice (1994). The Ordeal: My Ten Years in a Malaysian Prison. Arcade Publishing. ISBN 1559702303.
- Scheffler, Judith A., ed. (2002). "Beatrice Saubin (1959– )". Wall Tappings: An International Anthology of Women's Prison Writings, 200 to the Present. Feminist Press at CUNY. ISBN 1558612734.
