= Maizières-la-Grande-Paroisse =

Commune in Grand Est, France

- Commune
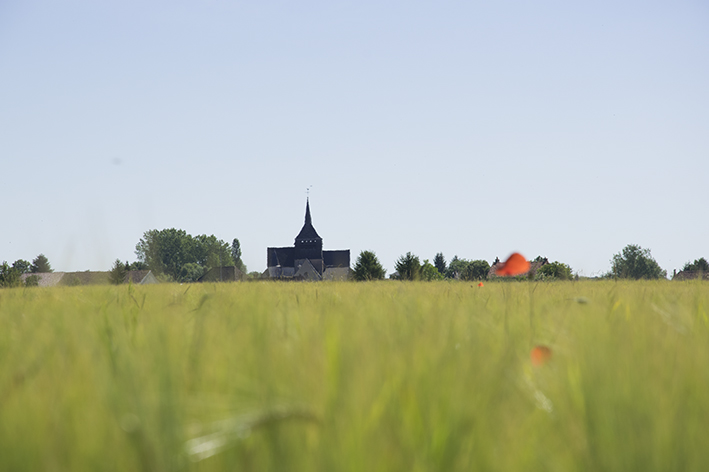
- A general view of Maizières-la-Grande-Paroisse

- Coat of arms
- Location of Maizières-la-Grande-Paroisse
- Location within France Location within Grand Est
- Coordinates: 48°30′45″N 3°47′28″E
- Country: France
- Region: Grand Est
- Department: Aube
- Arrondissement: Nogent-sur-Seine
- Canton: Romilly-sur-Seine
- Intercommunality: Portes de Romilly-sur-Seine

Government
  - Mayor (2020–2026): Michel Lamy
- Area^{1}: 20.46 km^{2} (7.90 sq mi)
- Elevation: 78 m (256 ft)
- Population (2023): 1,528
  - Density: 74.68/km^{2} (193.4/sq mi)
- Time zone: UTC+01:00 (CET)
  - Summer (DST): UTC+02:00 (CEST)
- INSEE/Postal code: 10220 /10510
- ^{1} French Land Register data, which excludes lakes, ponds, glaciers > 1 km^{2} (0.386 sq mi or 247 acres) and river estuaries.

Maizières-la-Grande-Paroisse (French pronunciation: [mɛzjɛʁ la ɡʁɑ̃d paʁwas]) is a commune in the Aube department in north-central France.

== Population ==
Inhabitants of Maizières-la-Grande-Paroisse are called Maiziérons.

Historical population
Year	Pop.	±% p.a.
1968	1,446	—
1975	1,367	−0.80%
1982	1,481	+1.15%
1990	1,521	+0.33%
1999	1,491	−0.22%
2007	1,404	−0.75%
2012	1,520	+1.60%
2017	1,492	−0.37%
2023	1,528	+0.40%
Source: INSEE

== See also ==
- Communes of the Aube department
