= Pierre Hanot =

French novelist, visual artist and musician

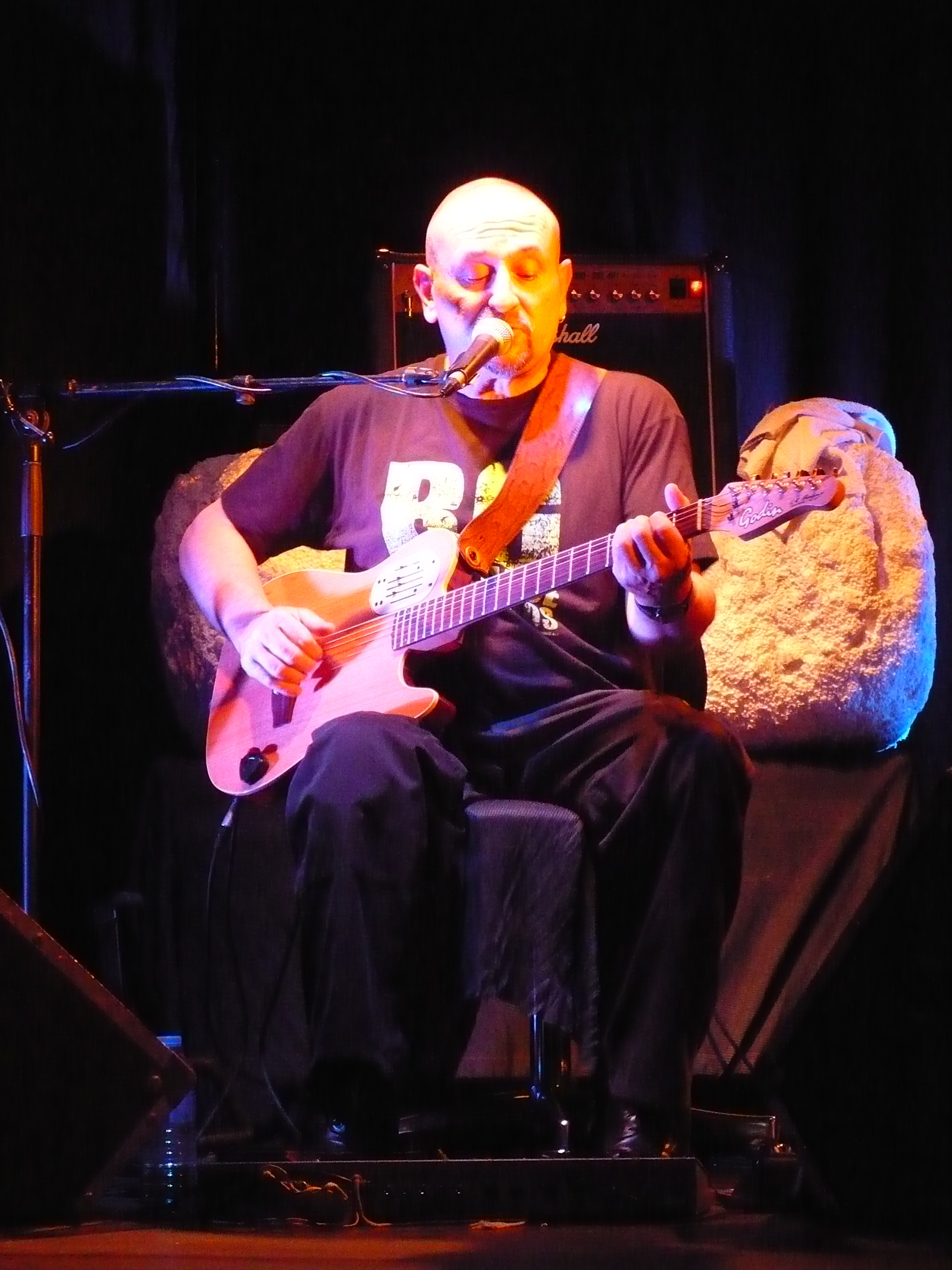
Pierre Hanot

Pierre Hanot (born 25 March 1952, Metz) is a French novelist, visual artist and musician.

== Biography ==
Hanot has performed over 1000 concerts, including more than 200 in most French prisons. He reported this experience in his first work, Rock'n taules published in 2005. Five of his novels have already been published including the thriller Les Clous du fakir, which was awarded the 2009 prix Erckmann-Chatrian.

== Books ==
- 2005: Rock'n Taules (narrative, éd. Le bord de l'eau) ISBN 2-915651-15-9: Testimony and reflection on the experience of his concerts in prisons.
- 2006: Les Hommes sont des icebergs (novel, éd. Le bord de l'eau) ISBN 2-915651-51-5: And if alcohol was banned in France?
- 2007: Serial Loser (Polar, éd. Mare Nostrum -collection Polar Rock) ISBN 978-2-908476-59-0
- 2009: Les clous du fakir (novel, Fayard Noir) ISBN 9782213646503
- 2012: Aux armes défuntes (novel, éd. Baleine): Novel of the inversion of values, burlesque tale oscillating between military equipment, ubuesque farce and parody of SF.
- 2012: Le couteau des mots (short story, Buchet/Chastel): short story in "Aux portes du noir", collective work devoted to The Doors.
- 2012: Tout du tatou: (Polar, Éditions La Branche, series "vendredi 13")

== Discography ==
- 1985: Rock dérive
- 1995: En un instant damnés
- 1996: Mosquée bleue
- 1997: On n’est pas des chiens
- 2000: Vu à la télé
