= Chékéba Hachemi =

Afghan diplomat and writer

Chékéba Hachemi شکیبا هاشمی
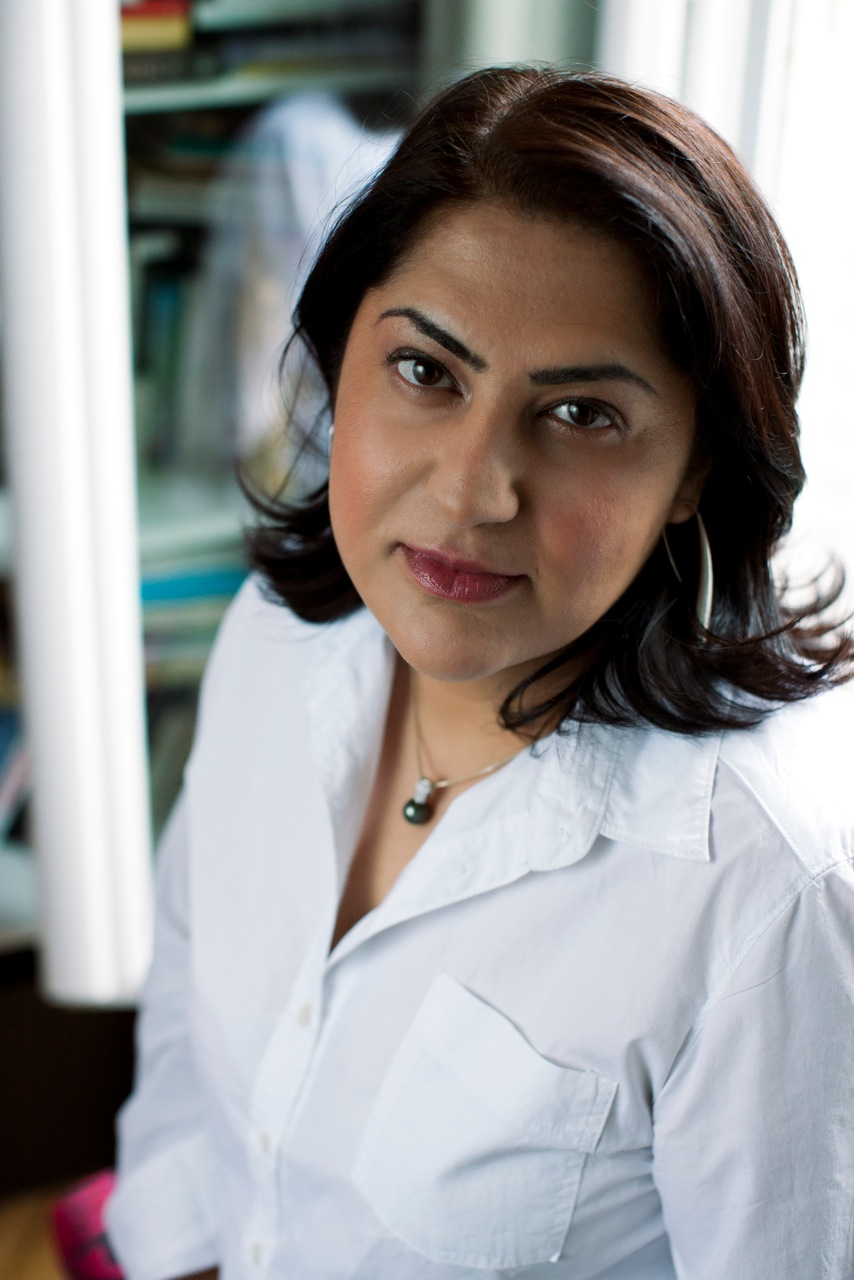
- Born: May 20, 1974 (age 52); Kabul, Afghanistan

Chékéba Hachemi (Dari: شکیبا هاشمی; born May 20, 1974) is an Afghan feminist and writer. She was the first Afghan woman to be named diplomat, in 2001. Hachemi is the President and founder of the NGO Afghanistan Libre.

== Early life and education ==
Chékéba Hachemi was born in Kabul in 1974. She fled her home country during the Soviet invasion in 1986 and arrived in France at the age of 11. She completed her studies at an École supérieure de commerce business school in Paris.

== Career and activism ==
Hachemi founded the organization Afghanistan Libre in 1996 in response to the deterioration of Afghan girls' and women's rights under the Taliban regime. For more than 20 years, the objective of Afghanistan Libre has been to facilitate the access to education, health and vocational trainings for girls and women in rural areas of Afghanistan to enable them to gain independence and to inform the world about the living conditions of Afghan women. During 10 years, the organization also published the magazine Roz, the only women's publication in the country.

In Europe and the United States, Hachemi has been running numerous actions for Afghanistan: press campaigns, lobbying with companies, political figures and institutions (work group with Kofi Annan, UN Secretary General at the time; guest of honour at the ILO, at the Woman's Day in Geneva and at the UNHCR).

First female diplomat of the Afghan transitional government, Hachemi was appointed First Secretary of the Afghan embassy to the European Union in January 2002. In July 2005, she was appointed by the government in Kabul as Special Advisor of the Vice-President, in charge of national priority projects. In March 2007, she was appointed by President Hamid Karzaï Minister-Advisor, based in Paris. In 2009, Hachemi resigned from her position, denouncing the corruption going on inside the government.

In 2009, Hachemi founded the consulting company Epoke Conseil with Marie-Françoise Colombani to promote equality between men and women in France and CH Consulting which is specialized in the study and design of social projects concerning the place of women in companies. As the Strategy Advisor of the Grand Duchess of Luxembourg, she was involved in the organisation of an international conference "Stand, Speak, Rise Up" to end sexual violence in fragile environments in Luxembourg in March 2019 in partnership with We are not weapons of war and the Denis Mukwege Foundation.

== Works ==
Hachemi is the author of L'Insolente de Kaboul, a memoir, published in 2012. She is co-author of Pour l'Amour de Massoud (Translation: For the Love of Massoud) with Sediqa Massoud, published in 2005, which received a Prix Vérité, and of Visage volé, avoir 20 ans à Kaboul (Translation: Stolen Face, being 20 years old in Kabul) with Latifa.

== Awards and recognitions ==
During her career, Hachemi has received numerous awards for her work for women and human rights:

- 2001: "Femme en or" prize
- 2008: "Women for Education Prize" Women's Economic Forum
- 2012: Trofémina, humanitary Prize
- 2012: Human Rights Prize of the French Republic
- 2013: Knight of the French Order of National Merit
- 2014: Golden medal at the Human Rights Forum "Crans Montana"
- 2016: RAJA Women's Award for education and social action
- 2017: The Positive Empowerment Award of Positive Planet Foundation
- 2019: International Prize "Women, digital, entrepreneurship", La France s'engage Foundation
