= Michel Castex =

French journalist and essayist

Michel Castex (born 1943) is a French journalist and essayist. He is editor-in-chief at Agence France-Presse (AFP).

== Career ==
As former president of AFP's editorial society, Michel Castex covered many international positions throughout his career. He directed the general information service and the AFP Audio service.

After covering the events of Poland (1981), the riots in Algeria and the funerals of Khomeiny, he led the Agence France Presse team to cover the Romanian Revolution from Bucharest in 1989, which earned him the Prix Vérité (1990 Special Prize of the jury) and the 1990 Prix Radio France de la communication for his book Un mensonge gros comme le siècle which earned him the Feuille d'or de la ville de Nancy prize. The book evokes the case of the false mass graves of Timișoara and raises the question of the manipulation of information. He has also directed numerous radio chronicles.

He was appointed director of the Beirut office in Lebanon, where he remained for nearly five years, covering the end of the war, the beginnings of reconstruction and the advancement of the peace process.

Back in France, Michel Castex was director of the western region for Agence France Presse (based in Rennes) and editor-in-chief at the AFP headquarters in Paris.

== Works ==
- 1990: Un mensonge gros comme le siècle, Albin Michel, ISBN 2226048073, Feuille d'or de la ville de Nancy
- 1990: Prix Vérité (Prix spécial du jury)
- 1990: Prix Radio France communication
- Texts of intermissions in La Bande à Bonnot by Boris Vian set in music by Louis Bessières.
