= Henriette Bernier =

French novelist (1937–2022)

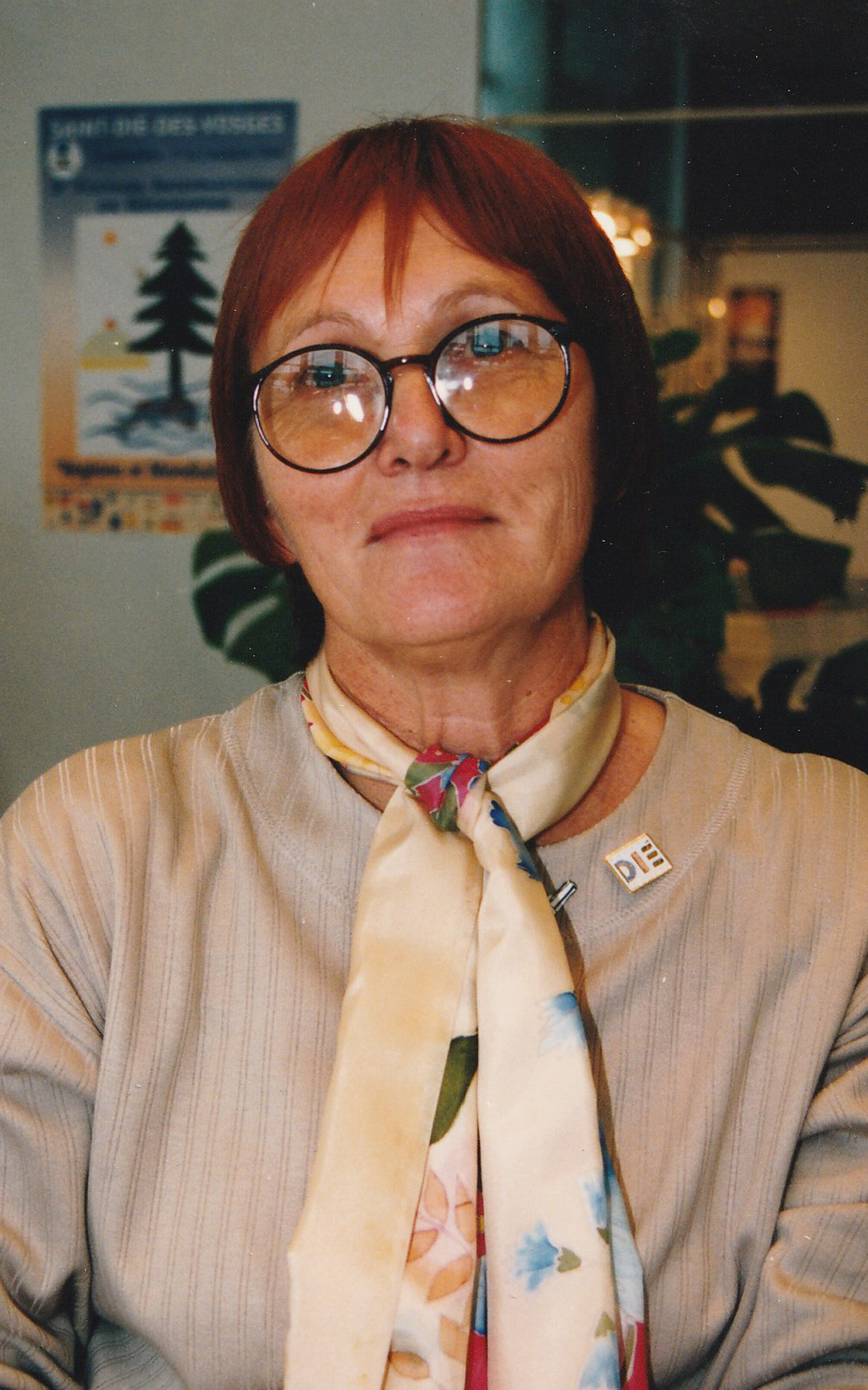
- Bernier in 1994
- Born: 1 October 1937; Meuse Department, France
- Died: 19 December 2022 (aged 85)
- Occupation: Novelist

Henriette Bernier (1 October 1937 – 19 December 2022) was a French novelist.

== Biography ==
Bernier was born into a peasant family in the department of Meuse on 1 October 1937. She graduated from normal school in Bar-le-Duc and became a teacher in Meuse, Algeria, Ivory Coast, and Marne. She retired in 1989 to devote herself to writing and moved to Bantheville in 1996. She was the author of nearly twenty novels.

Henriette Bernier died on 19 December 2022, at the age of 85.

== Novels ==
- Le Roi Basil (1991)
- La Folle aux chats (1992)
- Une femme empêchée (1994)
- L’Oreille de nacre (1996)
- Amours d’automne (1997)
- La Faute de Claire (1999)
- Léocadia (2000)
- Stella (2001)
- L’Enfant de l’autre (2004)
- L’Or blanc des pâturages (2005)
- L’Enfant de la dernière chance (2006)
- Le Choix de Pauline (2007)
- La Petite Louison (2008)
- Petite Mère (2008)
- Le Rêveur de l’écluse (2010)
- Le Baron des champs (2011)
- Bals, petits bals (2012)
- Le Bon Numéro (2013)
- Les Ombres de l'enfance (2015)

== Distinctions ==
- Prix Erckmann-Chatrian (1995)
