= Crancey =

Commune in Grand Est, France

- Commune
- Coat of arms
- Location of Crancey
- Location within France Location within Grand Est
- Coordinates: 48°31′02″N 3°38′22″E
- Country: France
- Region: Grand Est
- Department: Aube
- Arrondissement: Nogent-sur-Seine
- Canton: Romilly-sur-Seine
- Intercommunality: Portes de Romilly-sur-Seine

Government
  - Mayor (2020–2026): Bernard Berton
- Area^{1}: 8.81 km^{2} (3.40 sq mi)
- Elevation: 69 m (226 ft)
- Population (2023): 691
  - Density: 78.4/km^{2} (203/sq mi)
- Time zone: UTC+01:00 (CET)
  - Summer (DST): UTC+02:00 (CEST)
- INSEE/Postal code: 10114 /10100
- ^{1} French Land Register data, which excludes lakes, ponds, glaciers > 1 km^{2} (0.386 sq mi or 247 acres) and river estuaries.

Crancey (French pronunciation: [kʁɑ̃sɛ]) is a commune in the Aube department in north-central France.

== Population ==
Historical population
Year	Pop.	±% p.a.
1968	563	—
1975	849	+6.04%
1982	928	+1.28%
1990	833	−1.34%
1999	840	+0.09%
2007	814	−0.39%
2012	778	−0.90%
2017	719	−1.56%
2023	691	−0.66%
Source: INSEE

== See also ==
- Communes of the Aube department
