= Marcel Grosdidier de Matons =

French historian

Marcel Victor Felix Grosdidier de Matons (9 October 1885 – 2 December 1945) was a French historian.

== Life ==
Born in Paris, de Matons has written numerous books on the history of Lorraine, and was rewarded with the Montyon Prize by the Académie française.

He is the father of Jean Grosdidier de Matons and grandfather of François Grosdidier.

Matons died in Paramé (Ille-et-Vilaine) at age 60.

== Publications ==
- Le Comté de Bar des origines au Traité de Bruges vers 950-1301.
- Le mystère de Jeanne d'Arc. (Montyon Prize, 1937)
- Les villes d'art célèbres: Metz, illustrated book with 80 rotogravures, Librairie Renouard, H. Laurens, publisher, 1957
- Nouveau Guide de Metz
- En Lorraine
- En Lorraine: au cœur de la Lorraine. (Prix Erckmann-Chatrian, 1937)
- En Lorraine: de l'Argonne aux Vosges.
