= Alain Ménargues =

French journalist

Alain Ménargues (January 23, 1947 - September 5, 2021) was a French journalist, and former director of Radio France Internationale (RFI).

== Biography ==
He was a correspondent for Radio France from 1982 to 1995, based in Cairo and Beirut. He is currently a freelance journalist and writer based in Saudi Arabia since 2010. His books include Les Secrets de la guerre du Liban (Secrets of the Lebanon War) (2004, Albin Michel) and Le Mur de Sharon (Sharon's Wall) (2004, fr:Presses de la Renaissance).

In July 2004 Menargues was appointed as the head of news at RFI.

Awards won by him include the Prix Pierre Mille in 1985 for coverage of Lebanon, SCOOP award in 1988 for coverage of the Arab world and Le prix Palestine-Mahmoud Hamchari, a prize awarded by the Franco-Arab Solidarity Association, for his book Sharon's Wall.

== Controversy over statements about Israel and Jews ==
On September 30, 2004, while promoting his newly released book Le Mur de Sharon, speaking on LCI, Menargues said, "You say Israel is a democratic state? Let me also say Israel is a racist state". The RFI journalist union immediately condemned the statements: "Alain Menargues, the author, has every right to state that Israel is a racist state. However, Menargues is head of news at RFI and was presented as such on LCI. He thus expressed his opinion on behalf of our station. This is unacceptable." In an interview with AFP he stated that "Israel is a country like any other and like the others it must be criticized. There is no exception in my vision of the world, no country is above international laws."

In early October 2004, speaking on "right-wing radio channel" Radio Courtoisie, he said about the Israeli separation barrier, that "I was very shocked by the wall... Read Leviticus in the Torah. What is it about? Separation between pure and impure. To pray, a Jew must be pure and whatever comes in the way of this purity must be separated... Where was the first ghetto? In Venice. And who built it? It was the Jews themselves, in order to be separated from the rest. After that, Europe put them in ghettos".

Following the broadcast, the journalists' union of RFI, issued a statement reading: "We protest with indignation and we reject Alain Menargues's remarks on Jews and the State of Israel. It is now up to the president of RFI, Antoine Schwarz, to draw conclusions and take the appropriate measures."

The French Foreign Ministry called his remarks "unacceptable". Menargues resigned his post at RFI in October 2004.

In 2009, a Court of Appeals in Paris determined that his dismissal was unsound and ordered RFI to pay compensation for his 32 years service in public broadcasting. This was upheld by the Court of Cassation in 2011.
