= Jean-Marie Pontaut =

French investigative journalist

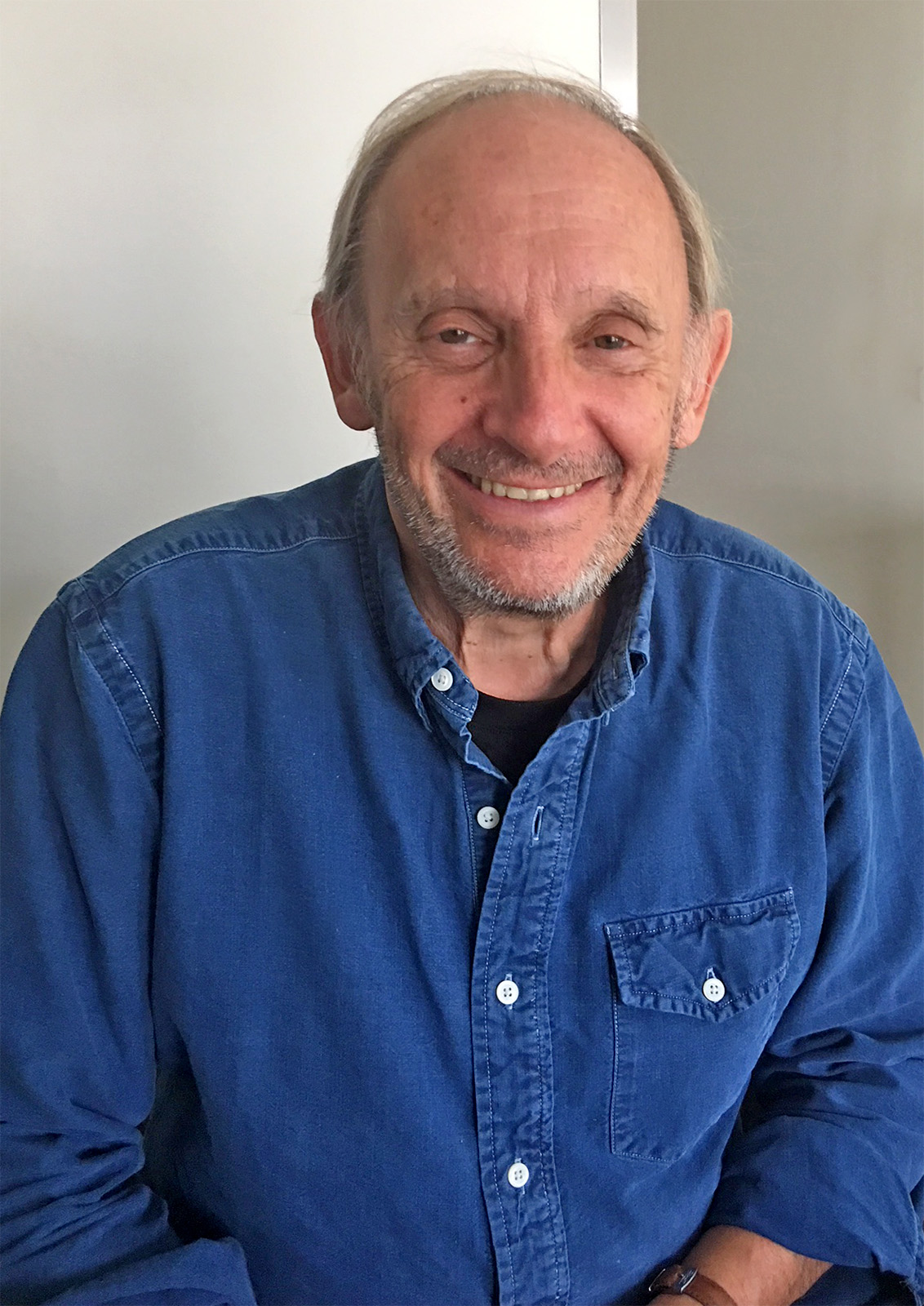
Jean-Marie Pontaut

Jean-Marie Pontaut (born 26 February 1947 in Neuilly-sur-Seine) is a French investigative journalist, working for the daily L'Express, after a start and a return trip to Le Point.

== Biography ==
Pontaut often worked in collaboration with Jacques Derogy.

Pontaut is the author of several books in collaboration, including a book on the affaire des écoutes de l'Élysée (Les Oreilles du Président) and another on the affaire Clearstream Affair cowritten with Gilles Gaetner (Règlement de comptes à l’Élysée). The former Prime Minister Dominique de Villepin lodged a complaint against him for defamation. The trial set for 21 and 22 June 2007, was postponed, Jean-Marie Pontaut having called as witnesses Jean-Louis Gergorin, Imad Lahoud and Denis Robert, charged in the criminal part of the Clearstream affair, as well as General Philippe Rondot. It is now time for the criminal investigation to be completed and the case finally decided, which can take years.

== Career ==
From 1970 to 1972, he was a reporter for the weekly Paris Match. From 1972 to July 1984, he was a reporter and head of inquiry at the weekly newspaper Le Point, in charge of judicial and police files. In September 1981, he became a member of the study commission of the Ministry of the Interior on the police. From July 1984 to November 1984, he was head of the society department of the weekly Le Point. From November 1984 to September 1986, he became a senior reporter for the weekly L'Express, and from September 1986 to August 1987, became head of the newspaper company's service department, where he became deputy editor-in-chief and head of the investigations section, from August 1987 to December 1988. From December 1988 to July 1995, he remained deputy editor-in-charge of the weekly newspaper Le Point, in charge of investigations at the service "Nation" and editor in chief of investigations. From September 1995 to February 1996, he was Deputy Editor-in-Chief of Europe 1, where he also presented the weekly investigations magazine Témoin n°1. Since April 1996, he has been editor (investigations) of the weekly L'Express.

== Prizes and distinctions ==
- 1987: Prix de la foundation Mumm.
- 1993: Prix Radio-France Nancy-Lorraine de la communication pour Investigation, passion.
- 1993: Feuille d'or de la ville de Nancy.

== Publications ==
- 1972: La Grande Cible, 1961-1964 : les secrets de l'OAS, in collaboration with François Caviglioli, Mercure de France
- 1981: Enquête sur les affaires d'un septennat, in collaboration with Jacques Derogy, éditions Robert Laffont, ISBN 2221008146
- 1984: Enquête sur les mystères de Marseille, in collaboration with Jacques Derogy, Robert Laffont, ISBN 2724222261
- 1986: Enquête sur trois secrets d¹État, in collaboration with Jacques Derogy, Robert Laffont
- 1987: Enquête sur un Carrefour dangereux, in collaboration with Jacques Derogy, Fayard, ISBN 2213019991
- 1989: L'État hors la loi, in collaboration with Francis Szpiner, Fayard, ISBN 2213023034
- 1992; L'Attentat - Le juge Bruguière accuse Khadafi, Fayard
- 1993: Investigation, Passion - Enquête sur 30 ans d'affaires, in collaboration with Jacques Derogy, Fayard, ISBN 2213030316
- 1994: Enquête sur les ripoux de la Côte - De l'affaire Médecin au meurtre de Yann Piat, in collaboration with Jacques Derogy, Fayard, ISBN 2213592845
- 1995: Agent secrète, in collaboration with Dominique Prieur, Fayard
- 1996: Les Oreilles du Président, suivi de la liste des 2000 personnes "écoutées" par François Mitterrand, in collaboration with Jérôme Dupuis, Fayard, ISBN 978-2213595368
- 1997: Enquête sur l'agent Hernu, cowritten with Jérôme Dupuis, Fayard
- 2000: L'Homme qui en sait trop - Alfred Sirven et les milliards d'Elf, in collaboration with Gilles Gaetner, Éditions Grasset
- 2001: Enquête sur la mort de Diana, in collaboration with Jérôme Dupuis, Stock, ISBN 2234050278
- 2002: Ils ont assassiné Massoud, in collaboration with Marc Epstein, Robert Laffont
- 2005: Demi-lune, (novel), Fayard, ISBN 978-2221097106
- 2006: Règlement de comptes pour l'Élysée - La manipulation Clearstream, in collaboration with Gilles Gaetner, OH ! Éditions, ISBN 978-2915056464
- 2006: Seul face à la justice américaine - Jean Peyrelevade accuse, in collaboration with Jean Peyrelevade, Plon, ISBN 978-2259204323
- 2008: Chronique d'une France occupée - Les rapports confidentiels de la gendarmerie, Éditions Michel Lafon, ISBN 978-2749907819
- 2014: Qui a tué le Juge Michel ?, in collaboration with Éric Pelletier, Michel Lafon, ISBN 978-2749922195
- 2015: Les grandes affaires de la Ve république, in collaboration with Philippe Broussard, Presses de la Cité, ISBN 978-2258116344
