= Prix Erckmann-Chatrian =

The prix Erckmann-Chatrian is a literary award from Lorraine, awarded every year since 1925 in memory of the literary duo Erckmann-Chatrian. It rewards a written prose work by someone form Lorraine or about Lorraine. It is often nicknamed the "Goncourt lorrain". The jury consists of literary figures of the four Lorraine departments.

In 1989, a scholarship was added to the prize, a scholarship for historical narrative and monograph. In 1993, this scholarship was divided into "scholarship for history" and "scholarship for monograph".

== List of laureates ==
- 1925: Eugène Mathis, Les Héros : gens de Fraize, L. Fleurent éd.
- 1926: Léopold Bouchot, Manuel d'histoire de Lorraine
- 1927: Henry Thierry, Anthologie lorraine
- 1928: Robert Parisot, Histoire de Lorraine
- 1929: Gabriel Gobron, Contes du Rupt-de-Mad
- 1930: Fernand Rousselot, À l'ombre du mirabellier (short stories)
- 1931: Jean-Pierre Jean, Mémorial du Souvenir Français en Moselle
- 1932: Henri Frémont, Mademoiselle Françoise, journaliste
- 1933: Henri Gaudel, Histoires de chez nous (short stories)
- 1934: Maurice Garot, Nancy la Ducale
- 1935: Marcel Grosdidier de Matons, Au cœur de la Lorraine
- 1936: Pol Ramber, Contes vosgiens (short stories)
- 1937: Paul-Émile Colin, En Lorraine, par sentiers et venelles (livre d'art, gravures).
- 1938: Chanoine Humbert, André Theuriet à Bar-le-Duc
- 1939: Martin de Briey, Le Jardin de Vaudémont (novel)
- 1940 to 1944 : Not attributed.
- 1945: Fernand Fizaine, La Patrie perdue (novel)
- 1946: Recteur Jules Blache, Le Grand refus (essay)
- 1947: Jacques Dieterlen, Honeck (novel)
- 1948: André Monnier-Zwingelstein, Clair-Moutier (novel)
- 1949: Gabriel Bichet, Évadés, souvenirs de guerre (narrative)
- 1950: René Bour, Histoire illustrée de Metz (monography)
- 1951: Chanoine Camille-Paul Joignon, Au cœur du Barrois (monography)
- 1952: Léon Fresse, Contes de la vallée des lacs (short stories)
- 1953: Pierre Marot, Pour la revue Le Pays Lorrain
- 1954: Georges Coanet, Metz pour nous deux (essay)
- 1955: André Dorny, Légendes lorraines (short stories)
- 1956: Étienne Delcambre, Élisabeth de Ranfaing (essay)
- 1957: Jean L'Hôte, La Communale
- 1958: Paul Testard, Épinal à travers les siècles (essay)
- 1959: René Vigneron, Aubes (novel)
- 1960: Yvette Muller, Les Taupins (novel)
- 1961: Robert Javelet, Camarade Curé (narrative)
- 1962: Jeanne-Berthe Tisserand, Souvenirs d'une réfugiée lorraine (narrative)
- 1963: Sylvette Brisson, Emmanuelle s'en va-t-en guerre (novel)
- 1964: Louis Baron-Jungmann, Jeux impurs (novel)
- 1965: Pierre de la Condamine, Une principauté de contes de fées : Salm en Vosges (essay)
- 1966: Georges Bassinot, La Page où l'on meurt (novel)
- 1967: Jacques-Joseph Bammert, La Walkyrie (novel)
- 1968: Claire Graf, Le Repaire en deuil (novel)
- 1969: Gabriel Bastien-Thiry, Les Haies folles (novel)
- 1970: Michel Huriet, Une fille de Manchester (novel)
- 1971: Henry Najean, Le Diable et les sorcières dans les Vosges (essay)
- 1972: Georges Sédir, Les Diplomates (novel)
- 1973: Jean Vartier, La Vie quotidienne en Lorraine au XIXe siècle (essay)
- 1974: André Jeammaire, Le Vieux Metz (essay)
- 1975: Henriette Méline, Catherine (novel)
- 1976: Jacqueline Verly, Les Loupiots du Haut- Ravin (novel)
- 1977: Roger Bichelberger, Les Noctambules (novel)
- 1978: Anne-Marie Blanc, Marie Romaine
- 1979: Francis Gruyer, Les Ruines du soleil (novel)
- 1980: Caroline Babert, Les Méandres de la Moselle (novel)
- 1981: Daniel Kircher, Le Maître des steppes (novel)
- 1982: Jules Dauendorffer, J'étais un Malgré-Nous
- 1983: Robert Muller, Sima, mon amour (novel)
- 1984: Gilles Laporte, Le Moulin du Roué
- 1985: Michel Caffier, L'Arbre aux pendus (novel)
- 1986: Claude Collignon, L'Enfant pensif (novel)
- 1987: François Martaine, Les Pommes noires (novel)
- 1988: Madeleine Steil, Le Mas des Micocouliers (novel)
- 1989: Anne Perry-Bouquet, Les landaus de la Mère Aza
- 1990: Thierry Lentz, Roederer
- 1994: Henriette Bernier, Une femme empêchée
- 1995: Claude Kévers-Pascalis, Saint Nicolas citoyen romain
- 1998: Gaston-Paul Effa, Mâ (Éditions Grasset)
- 1999: Philippe Claudel, Meuse l'oubli (Éditions Balland)
- 2000: Joël Egloff, Les Ensoleillés (Éditions du Rocher)
- 2001: Jocelyne François, Portrait d'un homme au crépuscule (Mercure de France)
- 2002: Hubert Mingarelli, La Beauté des loutres (Éditions du Seuil)
- 2003: Pierre Pelot, C'est ainsi que les hommes vivent (Éditions Denoël)
- 2004: Gérard Oberlé Retour à Zornhoff (Éditions Grasset)
- 2005: Jeanne Cressanges, Le Soleil des pierres (Le Cherche-Midi)
- 2006: Georges-Paul Cuny, Anna (Éditions L'Âge d'Homme)
- 2007: Michel Bernard, La Tranchée de Calonne (Éditions de la Table ronde)
- 2008: Gérald Tenenbaum, L'Ordre des jours (Héloïse d'Ormesson)
- 2009: Pierre Hanot, Les Clous du fakir (Fayard Noir)
- 2010: Élise Fontenaille, Les Disparues de Vancouver (Grasset)
- 2011: Yves Simon, La Compagnie des femmes (Stock)
- 2012: Tierno Monénembo, Le Terroriste noir (Le Seuil)
- 2013: Maria Pourchet, Rome en un jour (Éditions Gallimard)
- 2014: Nicolas Mathieu, Aux Animaux la Guerre (Actes Sud)
- 2015: Hélène Gestern, Portrait d'après blessure (Arléa)
- 2016: Michel Louyot, Un chouan lorrain (Paraiges)
- 2017: Edith Masson, Des carpes et des muets (Editions du Sonneur)
- 2018: Fabienne Jacob, Un homme aborde une femme (Buchet/Chastel)
