= Jean-Marc Sylvestre =

French journalist (1946–2026)

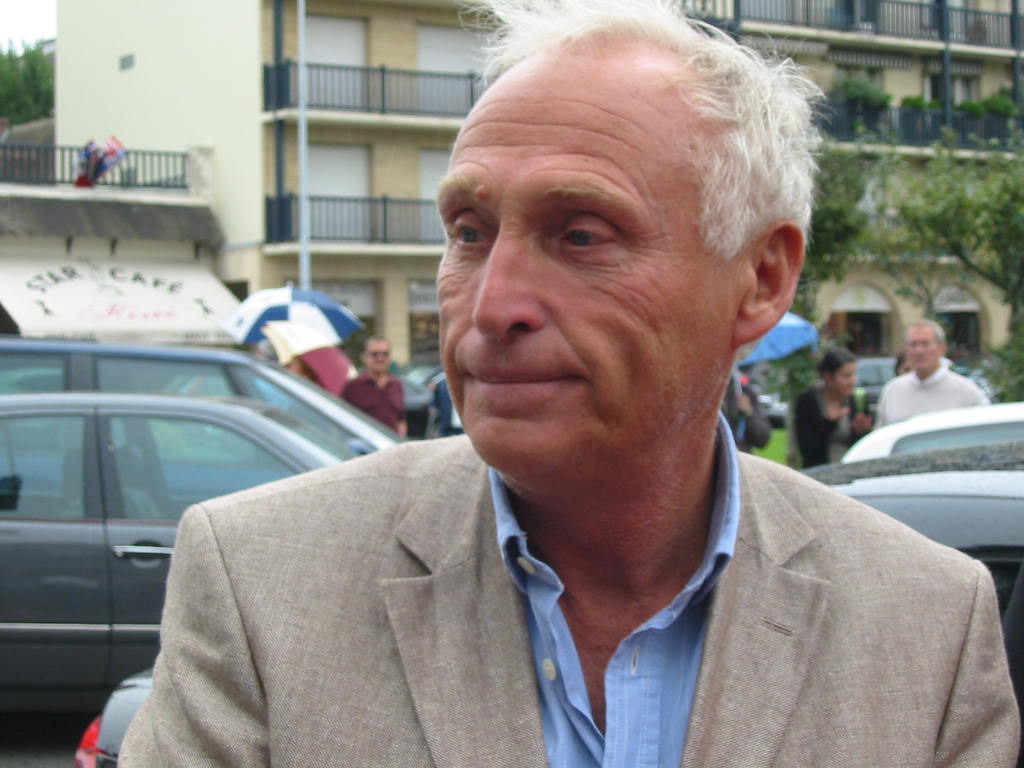
- Sylvestre in 2006
- Born: 29 October 1946; Alençon, France
- Died: 21 July 2026 (aged 79)
- Education: Paris Dauphine University; University of Caen Normandy
- Occupation: Journalist

Jean-Marc Sylvestre (French: [ʒˈɑ̃-mˈaʁk silvˈɛstʁ]; 29 October 1946 – 21 July 2026) was a French journalist.

== Life and career ==
Born in Alençon on 29 October 1946, Sylvestre earned a doctorate from Paris Dauphine University and served as an assistant professor at the University of Caen Normandy before joining TF1 in 1997. From 1997 to 2001, he co-hosted the show Les Rendez-vous de l'entreprise alongside Nicolas Beytout. After Beytout's departure, he was the sole host of Les Coulisses de l'économie, which aired from 2001 to 2008. He was also an economic commentator for France Inter, which he took to the Labour Court for a dispute over his contract. The two parties reached an undisclosed settlement out of court.

In 2010, Sylvestre left TF1 and joined i>Télé. He became the host of the Sunday show Les Clés de l'éco, an economics program produced in partnership with Les Echos. In December 2017, he joined RT France after having been described as "ultra-liberal" by Le Canard enchaîné. The liberal label was criticized by far-right politician Jean-Gilles Malliarakis, though he refuted his stances in his book Une petite douleur à l’épaule gauche, where he commended the French healthcare system. He was also close to the political party Union for a Popular Movement.

Sylvestre died on 21 July 2026, at the age of 79.

== Decorations ==
- Officer of the Legion of Honour (2004)
- Knight of the Ordre national du Mérite

== Publications ==
- La Stratégie financière de l'entreprise (1973)
- La France bancale (1978)
- L'État patron, c'est moi (1984)
- Le Guide SVP de l'Europe (1994)
- Tout compte fait (1995)
- Une petite douleur à l'épaule gauche (2003)
- Petites Leçons d'économie à la portée de tous (2007)
- La France piégée : comprendre la crise (2008)
- Le Roman vrai de la crise financière (2009)
- Nouvelles Petites Leçons d'économie pour ceux qui doutent des promesses qu'on leur fait (2011)
- On nous ment ! Vérités et légendes sur la crise (2011)
- Tout va bien (ou presque) : la preuve en 18 leçons (2013)
- Tout n'est pas foutu ! : le cancer a sauvé ma libido (2021)
