= David Haziot =

French writer (born 1947)

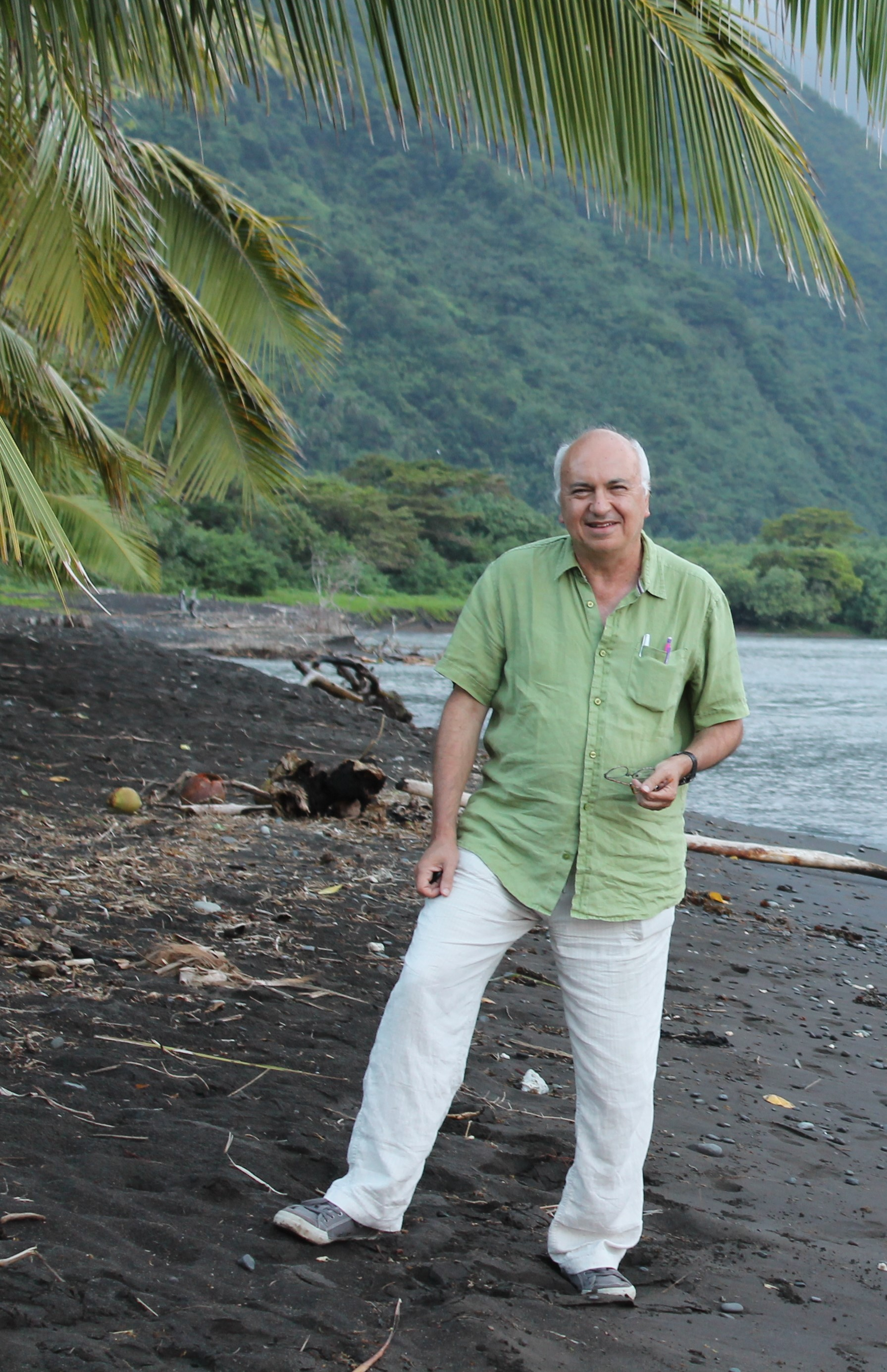
David Haziot Tahiti 2012

David Haziot (born 1947 in Casablanca) is a French writer. Holder of a Master of Philosophy at the Sorbonne on the cinema of Sergei Eisenstein, he then turned to fiction, biography, and essay. He obtained a prize of the Académie Française for his biography of Vincent van Gogh and the Prix Goncourt de la Biographie for his latest work about the Rouart family.

== Publications ==
- 1989: L'Or du Temps, novel in comics loosely based on the myth of Orpheus and located in Pharaonic Egypt, in collaboration with François Baranger (drawings), 3 Tomes, Dargaud :
  - Tome 1 : Fille de l'ombre, April 1989.
  - Tome 2 : L'autre rive, July 1989.
  - Tome 3 : La chair des dieux, October 1989
- 2000: Le Vin de la Liberté, Roman, Robert Laffont, ISBN 978-2-221-09228-6, Prix littéraire de l'Académie du Vin de Bordeaux en 2000, Prix du roman historique en 2001 aux Rendez-vous de l'Histoire à Blois.
- 2004: Elles, novel, Autrement, ISBN 978-2-7467-0509-8.
- 2007: Château Pichon-Longueville comtesse de Lalande, La passion du vin, historical monography, Photographs by Anne Garde, La Martinière, ISBN 2-7324-3489-2.
- 2007: Van Gogh, Biography, Gallimard-Folio, ISBN 978-2-07-030757-9, Prix de l'Académie française, Médaille de vermeil, 2008.
- 2010: Théâtre d'ombres, novel, Denoël, ISBN 978-2-207-25788-3
- 2012: Le Roman des Rouart (1850-2000), Biographie, Fayard, ISBN 978-2-213-66858-1, Prix Goncourt de la biographie 2012
- 2013: Cercles 1991 - 2011, trilingual text (French, English, German) for the catalog of the Gary Fabian Miller exhibition, ISBN 978-2-9533072-4-5, Galerie Gimpel et Müller, Paris October 2013.
- 2013: Voyage à Auschwitz, Le démon de la certitude. e-book, August 2013. English translation by Anna Harrison Voyage to Auschwitz, The demon of certainty. e-book, February 2014.
- 2014: Preface for the book Van Gogh, Pour planer au-dessus de la vie by Karin Müller, Éditions Michel de Maule, ISBN 978-2-87623-554-0, May 2014.
- 2014: Repères biographiques (Henri Rouart, Ernest Rouart, Augustin Rouart), in Les Rouart, de l’impressionnisme au réalisme magique, work under the direction of Dominique Bona, with texts by Jean-Marie Rouart, Frédéric Vitoux, David Haziot, Charles Villeneuve de Janti, Paul Valéry and Léon-Paul Fargue, Éditions Gallimard, Paris, ISBN 978-2-07-014386-3, October 2014.
- 2016: L’insoumise, Tome 1 : Les Eaux de Lune, comic novel set in Italy in the sixteenth, with collaboration by François Baranger (drawings), ISBN 978-2-9554167-0-9, La Mare aux Loups, February 2016.

== See also ==
- Château Cos d'Estournel
- Château Pichon Longueville Comtesse de Lalande
