= Jacques Derogy =

French journalist (1925–1997)

- Born: Jacques Weitzmann; July 24, 1925; Neuilly-sur-Seine, Hauts-de-Seine, France
- Died: October 30, 1997 (aged 72); Neuilly-sur-Seine, France
- Occupation: Journalist
- Children: 1 son, 2 daughters

Jacques Derogy (1925–1997) was a French investigative journalist.

== Early life ==
Jacques Derogy was born on July 24, 1925, in Neuilly-sur-Seine, Hauts-de-Seine département, near Paris. His father, Henri Weitzmann, was a journalist. During World War II, they hid in the Ardèche with members of the French resistance.

== Career ==
Derogy started his career as a journalist by writing for Franc-Tireur and L'Intransigeant. He wrote for L'Express from 1959 to 1987, and subsequently for L'Evenement du Jeudi. During one of his investigations, he uncovered the criminal past of Paul Touvier during World War II. He also wrote about Israel.

Derogy was the author of many books.

== Death ==
Derogy died of cancer on October 30, 1997, in Neuilly-sur-Seine, France.

== Works ==
- Derogy, Jacques; Saab, Edouard (1968). Les Deux exodes. Paris: Denoël. OCLC 7542191.
- Derogy, Jacques (1970). La loi du retour : la secrète et véritable histoire de l'Exodus. Paris: Fayard. OCLC 3772588.
- Derogy, Jacques (1973). 100,000 Juifs à la mer. Paris: Stock. OCLC 829110.
- Derogy, Jacques; Gurgand, Jean Noël (1975). Israël, la mort en face. Paris: Robert Lafont. OCLC 1277796.
- Derogy, Jacques (1977). Enquête sur un juge assassiné : vie et mort du magistrat lyonnais François Renaud. Paris: Robert Lafont. OCLC 418503494.
- Derogy, Jacques; Karmel, Hazi (1978). Histoire secrète d'Israël : 1917-1977. Paris: O. Orban. ISBN 9782855650807. OCLC 5195826.
- Derogy, Jacques (1980). Israel connection : la première enquête sur la mafia d'Israël. Paris: Plon. ISBN 9782259005920. OCLC 7250218.
- Derogy, Jacques (1980). La traque. Paris: O. Orban. ISBN 9782855651392. OCLC 9395161.
- Derogy, Jacques; Kupferman, Fred; Misrachi, Arianne (1980). Le cas Wallenberg. Paris: Ramsay. OCLC 7203067.
- Derogy, Jacques; Pontaut, Jean-Marie (1981). Enquête sur les "affaires" d'un septennat. Paris: Robert Lafont. ISBN 9782221008140. OCLC 9237654.
- Derogy, Jacques; Pontaut, Jean-Marie (1984). Enquête sur les mystères de Marseille. Paris: Robert Lafont. ISBN 9782221011522. OCLC 11260985.
- Derogy, Jacques; Pontaut, Jean-Marie (1986). Enquête sur trois secrets d'Etat. Paris: Robert Lafont. ISBN 9782221052068. OCLC 15033201.
- Derogy, Jacques (1986). Opération Némésis. Paris: Fayard. ISBN 9782213018294. OCLC 15504159.
- Derogy, Jacques; Pontaut, Jean-Marie (1987). Enquête sur un carrefour dangereux. Paris: Fayard. ISBN 9782213019994. OCLC 21490078.
- Derogy, Jacques; Karmel, Hazi (1989). Israël ultra-secret. Paris: Robert Lafont. ISBN 9782221055281. OCLC 20862249.
- Derogy, Jacques; Karmel, Hazi (1992). Bonaparte en Terre sainte. Paris: Fayard. ISBN 9782213025544. OCLC 35919143.
- Derogy, Jacques; Pontaut, Jean-Marie (1993). Investigation, passion. Paris: Fayard. ISBN 9782213030319. OCLC 410926051.
- Derogy, Jacques; Karmel, Hazi (1994). Le siècle d'Israël : les secrets d'une épopée : 1895-1995. Paris: Fayard. ISBN 9782213029351. OCLC 417162583.
- Derogy, Jacques; Pontaut, Jean-Marie (1994). Enquête sur les ripoux de la Côte : de l'affaire Médecin au meurtre de Yann Piat. Paris: Fayard. ISBN 9782213592848. OCLC 31437021.
- Derogy, Jacques; Karmel, Hazi (1996). Ils ont tué Rabin : enquête sur une mort annoncée. Paris: Robert Lafont. OCLC 409513117.
- Derogy, Jacques (1998). Une ligne de chance : autobiographie interrompue. Paris: Fayard. ISBN 9782213600710. OCLC 39136943.
- Derogy, Jacques; Derogy-Weitzmann, Renée; Ploquin, Frédéric (1999). Ils ont tué Ben Barka. Paris: Fayard. ISBN 9782213603827. OCLC 41529804.
