= Romilly-sur-Seine =

Commune in Grand Est, France

- Commune
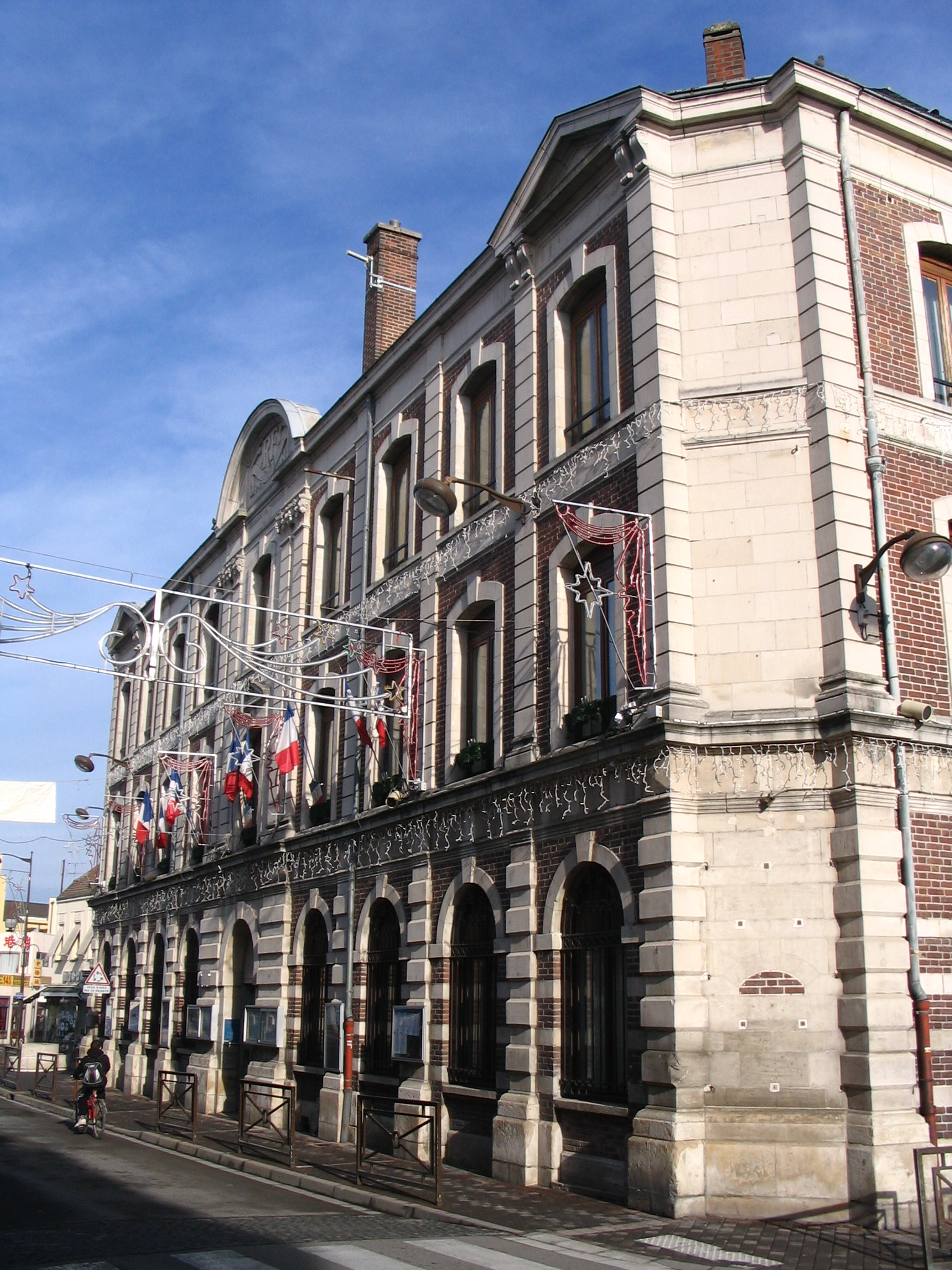
- The town hall in Romilly-sur-Seine

- Coat of arms
- Location of Romilly-sur-Seine
- Location within France Location within Grand Est
- Coordinates: 48°31′00″N 3°43′39″E
- Country: France
- Region: Grand Est
- Department: Aube
- Arrondissement: Nogent-sur-Seine
- Canton: Romilly-sur-Seine
- Intercommunality: Portes de Romilly-sur-Seine

Government
  - Mayor (2020–2026): Eric Vuillemin
- Area^{1}: 25.32 km^{2} (9.78 sq mi)
- Elevation: 75 m (246 ft)
- Highest elevation: 126 m (413 ft)
- Lowest elevation: 100 m (330 ft)
- Population (2023): 14,959
  - Density: 590.8/km^{2} (1,530/sq mi)
- Time zone: UTC+01:00 (CET)
  - Summer (DST): UTC+02:00 (CEST)
- INSEE/Postal code: 10323 /10100
- ^{1} French Land Register data, which excludes lakes, ponds, glaciers > 1 km^{2} (0.386 sq mi or 247 acres) and river estuaries.

Romilly-sur-Seine (French pronunciation: [ʁɔmiji syʁ sɛn], literally Romilly on Seine) is a commune in the Aube department in north-central France.

== Population ==
Historical population

Year	Pop.	±% p.a.
1793	1,989	—
1800	2,166	+1.23%
1806	2,294	+0.96%
1821	2,478	+0.52%
1831	3,117	+2.32%
1836	3,341	+1.40%
1841	3,737	+2.27%
1846	3,831	+0.50%
1851	3,738	−0.49%
1856	3,945	+1.08%
1861	4,290	+1.69%
1866	4,534	+1.11%
1872	5,030	+1.75%
1876	5,190	+0.79%
1881	5,283	+0.36%
1886	6,938	+5.60%
1891	7,244	+0.87%
1896	7,978	+1.95%
1901	9,001	+2.44%

Year	Pop.	±% p.a.
1906	9,929	+1.98%
1911	11,371	+2.75%
1921	12,943	+1.30%
1926	13,399	+0.69%
1931	14,073	+0.99%
1936	13,977	−0.14%
1946	13,314	−0.48%
1954	13,731	+0.39%
1962	15,753	+1.73%
1968	17,038	+1.32%
1975	17,397	+0.30%
1982	15,937	−1.24%
1990	15,557	−0.30%
1999	14,616	−0.69%
2007	14,167	−0.39%
2012	13,968	−0.28%
2017	14,451	+0.68%
2023	14,959	+0.58%

Source: EHESS and INSEE (1968-2023)

== International relations ==
Romilly-sur-Seine is twinned with:

- (Wales) Milford Haven, United Kingdom
- Gotha, Germany
- Lüdenscheid, Germany
- Medicina, Italy
- Uman, Ukraine

== Climate ==
Climate data for Romilly-sur-Seine, elevation: 77 m (253 ft) (1991-2020 normals, extremes 1921-present)
Month	Jan	Feb	Mar	Apr	May	Jun	Jul	Aug	Sep	Oct	Nov	Dec	Year
Record high °C (°F)	16.2 (61.2)	21.7 (71.1)	27.0 (80.6)	29.8 (85.6)	35.6 (96.1)	38.0 (100.4)	42.3 (108.1)	39.9 (103.8)	35.4 (95.7)	31.8 (89.2)	22.9 (73.2)	19.4 (66.9)	42.3 (108.1)
Mean daily maximum °C (°F)	6.7 (44.1)	8.1 (46.6)	12.4 (54.3)	16.1 (61.0)	19.8 (67.6)	23.3 (73.9)	26.2 (79.2)	25.9 (78.6)	21.5 (70.7)	16.4 (61.5)	10.5 (50.9)	7.2 (45.0)	16.2 (61.2)
Daily mean °C (°F)	3.7 (38.7)	4.4 (39.9)	7.4 (45.3)	10.2 (50.4)	13.9 (57.0)	17.2 (63.0)	19.6 (67.3)	19.3 (66.7)	15.5 (59.9)	11.7 (53.1)	7.1 (44.8)	4.4 (39.9)	11.2 (52.2)
Mean daily minimum °C (°F)	0.8 (33.4)	0.6 (33.1)	2.4 (36.3)	4.3 (39.7)	8.0 (46.4)	11.1 (52.0)	12.9 (55.2)	12.6 (54.7)	9.4 (48.9)	7.1 (44.8)	3.7 (38.7)	1.5 (34.7)	6.2 (43.2)
Record low °C (°F)	−25.2 (−13.4)	−25.0 (−13.0)	−14.4 (6.1)	−6.1 (21.0)	−3.5 (25.7)	−1.0 (30.2)	1.6 (34.9)	1.1 (34.0)	−3.0 (26.6)	−6.8 (19.8)	−11.5 (11.3)	−23.0 (−9.4)	−25.2 (−13.4)
Average precipitation mm (inches)	47.8 (1.88)	46.5 (1.83)	43.8 (1.72)	44.4 (1.75)	60.4 (2.38)	50.3 (1.98)	49.7 (1.96)	53.9 (2.12)	48.3 (1.90)	59.9 (2.36)	52.7 (2.07)	61.8 (2.43)	619.5 (24.39)
Average precipitation days (≥ 1.0 mm)	10.4	9.7	9.3	9.0	9.9	8.4	8.1	8.0	7.9	9.5	10.4	11.7	112.3
Mean monthly sunshine hours	47.7	93.1	138.5	179.5	204.9	233.3	253.1	230.5	184.6	139.6	62.9	53.9	1,821.6
Source 1: Meteociel
Source 2: Infoclimat (sunshine hours)

== Notable people ==
- Béatrice Saubin (1959–2007), first foreign national to be sentenced to death for drug smuggling in Malaysia

== See also ==
- Communes of the Aube department
