= Michel Caffier =

French journalist, writer, and literary critic (1930–2021)

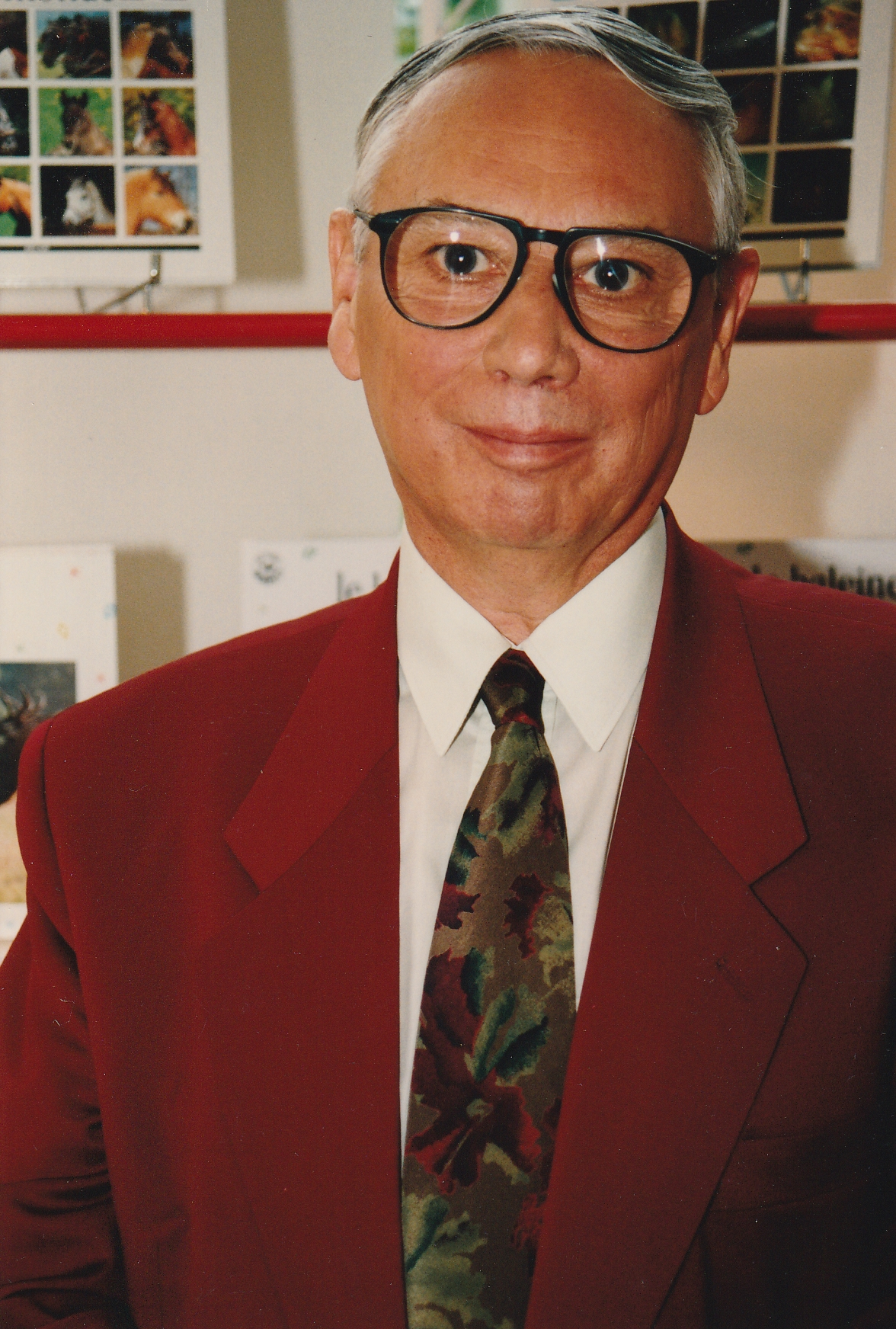
Michel Caffier (French journalist)

Michel Caffier (born 17 June 1930 in Boulogne-sur-Mer – 10 January 2021) was a French journalist, writer, and literary critic. He is the author of an abundant work centered on Lorraine: historical novels, essays and reference works, including the Dictionnaire des littératures de Lorraine.

== Biography ==
Caffier was a senior reporter and literary critic for L'Est Républicain, of which he was deputy chief editor. From 1986 to 2002, Caffier was the president of the jury who awards the yearly Prix Erckmann-Chatrian to a work written by a Lorrain or concerning Lorraine.

On January 10, 2021, Caffier died at age 90.

== Distinctions ==
- Prix littéraire des Conseils généraux de la Région Lorraine: winner in 1989, 1993 and 2001.

== Works (selection) ==
- 1985: L'Arbre aux pendus. Vie et misères de Jacques Callot, Presses universitaires de Nancy
- 1990: L'Affaire de Nancy : pièce en sept tableaux, Nancy, Théâtre de la Manufacture, 6 mars, Presses universitaires de Nancy
- 1994: L'Académie Goncourt, Presses universitaires de France, Paris, 1994, series "Que sais-je?"
- 1994: Les frères Goncourt : un déshabillé de l'âme, Presses universitaires de Nancy
- 1998: Encyclopédie illustrée de la Lorraine. Art et littérature. Le théâtre en Lorraine, preface by Jack Lang, Éd. Serpenoise, Metz
- 2001: La deuxième vie de Léopold Poiré photographe, Metz 1879 - Nancy 1917, Éd. Pierron, Sarreguemines
- 2001: Les enfants du flot, Ed. Presses de la Cité
- 2003: Dictionnaire des littératures de Lorraine, Éd. Serpenoise, Metz, 2 vol., 1042 p.
- 2006: La Berline du roi Stanislas, Pocket, Paris
- 2007: Le TGV de 8 h 47 : quinze voyages littéraires en Lorraine, La Nuée bleue, Strasbourg
- 2007: L'Excelsior : un siècle d'art de vivre à Nancy, Éditions Place Stanislas, Nancy
- 2008: Au Panthéon des Dames de Lorraine. Sept destins de femmes de caractère, La Nuée bleue, Strasbourg
- 2012: Le Hameau des mirabelliers, Presses de la Cité, Paris
- 2012: Petites histoires de la grande Lorraine : 50 avant J.-C.-2013, Éd. Serpenoise, Metz
