= Connemara (disambiguation) =

Connemara (Irish: Conamara) is a district in the west of Ireland.

Connemara or Conamara may also refer to:

== Places ==
- Connemara, Alberta, a locality in Canada
- Conamara Chaos, a region of chaotic terrain on Jupiter's moon Europa
- Connemara Station, a cattle station in Queensland

== Arts, entertainment, and media ==
- Les Lacs du Connemara, a 1981 song by French singer Michel Sardou
- Connemara (novel), a novel by Nicolas Mathieu, the title of which relates to the Sardou song.
- The Hills of Connemara, an Irish drinking song by Sean McCarthy about Irish moonshine (or Poitín)

== Other uses ==
- Connemara, a brand of Irish whiskey produced by the Cooley Distillery
- Carl Sandburg Home National Historic Site, the former home of poet Carl Sandburg in Flat Rock, North Carolina, which he named after the Connemara region
- Connemara pony, a breed of horse
- Connemara Public Library, a public library in Chennai, Tamil Nadu India
