= Sam Taylor (author) =

British author (born 1970)

Sam Taylor (born 1970) is a British author, translator and former pop culture correspondent for The Observer, a job he left in 2001. His first book, The Republic of Trees, was published in 2005 and received critical acclaim. His second novel, The Amnesiac, tells the story of James Purdew, a man obsessed with uncovering the events of three years of his life about which he remembers nothing.

Taylor lives in Texas with his family.

Along with Laurent Binet, Taylor won the Sidewise Award for Alternate History in 2022 for his translation of Binet's novel Civilizations.

== The Amnesiac ==
His 2007 book The Amnesiac includes the fictional main character James Purdew and a character named Tomas Ryal a Czech philosopher, playwright and poet, who is described as living from 1900 to 1973 and is famous for his controversial repudiation of the existence of memory, and also for the mysterious manner of his death. It is assumed that he was pupil of a famous Czech pedagogist, philosopher and inventor Jára da Cimrman. Ryal was given an entry at the Encyclopedia Labyrinthus.

== Bibliography ==
- The Republic of Trees (Faber, 2005)
- The Amnesiac (Faber, 2007)
- The Island at the End of the World (Faber, 2009)
- The Ground is Burning - published as Samuel Black (Faber, 2011)
- The Two Loves of Sophie Strom (Faber, 2024)

== Translations ==
Taylor also works as a translator, from French to English. These are some of the works he has translated:

- HHhH (by Laurent Binet) (Farrar, Straus and Giroux, 2012)
- A Meal in Winter (Un repas en hiver by Hubert Mingarelli) (2012)
- The Victoria System (Hamish Hamilton, 2013)
- The truth about the Harry Quebert affair, (MacLehose Press, 2014)
- The Age of Reinvention, (L'invention de nos vies by Karine Tuil) (2015)
- Four Soldiers (Quatre Soldats by Hubert Mingarelli) (2018)
- Lullaby (Chanson Douce by Leïla Slimani) (2018)
- Adèle (Dans le jardin de l'ogre by Leïla Slimani) (2019)
- Civilizations (by Laurent Binet) (2021)
- Of Fangs and Talons (Aux animaux la guerre by Nicolas Mathieu) (2021)
- Connemara by Nicolas Mathieu (2022)
- Rose Royal: A Love Story (Rose Royal by Nicolas Mathieu) (2022)
- Perspective(s) (by Laurent Binet) (2025)
- The Man Who Read Books (L'homme qui lisait des livres by Rachid Benzine) (2026)
