= And Their Children After Them (novel) =

2018 novel by Nicolas Mathieu

- Cover of first edition
- Author: Nicolas Mathieu
- Original title: Leurs enfants après eux
- Translator: William Rodarmor
- Language: French
- Publisher: Actes Sud
- Publication date: 2018
- Publication place: France
- OCLC: 1052883063
- Dewey Decimal: 843/.92
- LC Class: PQ2713.A8767 L48 2018

And Their Children After Them (French: Leurs enfants après eux, literal translation Their Children After Them) is a 2018 novel by French writer Nicolas Mathieu. Actes Sud published the novel, Mathieu's second. An English translation by William Rodarmor was published by Hodder & Stoughton and Other Press in April 2020.

== Summary ==
The novel portrays the lives of teenagers and adolescents in peri-urban areas of eastern France in the 1990s, and deals with the consequences of deindustrialization. It follows the group of young people over the course of six years.

The novel is divided into four parts:

=== I. Smells Like Teen Spirit - 1992 ===
Anthony was incredibly bored in the summer of 1992 in a fictional town called Heillange in the also-fictional Vallée de la Henne (Note: In his novel, Nicolas Mathieu renames the town of Hayange and the Fensch valley. Furthermore, the choice of the name Heillange alludes simultaneously to Hell and Angel (cited from: Mauretta Capuano, ANSA, 2019)) in the Moselle region of France. At fourteen, he ogled the girls at the lake, got into all sorts of mischief with his cousin, and now his family has been hit by hard times, like so many others in the region, due to the crisis in the Lorraine steel industry. Short and broad-shouldered, with drooping eyes, he felt ill at ease, obsessed like all boys with older girls without being able to truly interact with them, especially Steph. To go to a party at the "bourgeois" house in the next town over, he borrowed his father's Yamaha YZ motorcycle with his cousin, who was supposed to supply the guests with weed. Unfortunately, that evening the motorcycle was stolen by Hacine, a petty slacker from the neighboring housing project, and Anthony, with his mother's help, had to hide it from his father, who would otherwise fly into a rage. Mother and son decided to go to Hacine's house to try and get the motorcycle back, but to no avail. However, the humiliation was too much for Hacine's father, who beat him. Hacine retaliated the next day by burning the motorcycle in front of Anthony's house. Enraged, Anthony went to confront Hacine in his own neighborhood.

=== II. You Could Be Mine - 1994 ===
Two years have passed, and now in the summer of 1994, Anthony, whose parents divorced following the motorcycle incident, is working at the local yacht club. At a party, he runs into Steph again. She still has the same effect on him, but now she no longer seems so indifferent or disdainful. After an altercation with a colleague, he manages to slip Steph a note to arrange a date, then leaves that night to join Vanessa in her tent, with whom he has developed a casual-sexual relationship. The next day, Steph meets up with her boyfriend Simon, with whom she plans to spend her vacation, before he backs out and leaves her and her best friend Clem, announcing that he's going to the United States. Furious, she decides to break up with Simon again, who spends his time lying and chasing after several girls at the same time.

Hacine went to Tetouan at his father's insistence to set him on the right path. Instead of following his father's plan, he built a thriving cannabis trafficking operation between Morocco and Europe in just two years. Then, he gets swindled and loses everything. So he is back in the housing project and intends to rule the local black market after eliminating the neighborhood kingpin. While picking up his father after the funeral of a former colleague from the closed steel factory, he runs into Anthony and his parents at the L'Usine bar, who have also attended the ceremony for their former neighbor. At the height of this chance encounter, fueled by resentment and humiliation, Hacine attacks Anthony in the restrooms of the bar. Anthony is only just defended by his father, Patrick, who then beats Hacine senseless when he learns the whole story about the motorcycle that led to the final breakup of his already dysfunctional family.

Despite all the events of the day, Anthony goes to his date with Steph, who has finally decided, as much to get revenge on Simon as out of attraction to the teenager who has changed a lot, to take advantage of this opportunity.

=== III. La Fièvre - 14 July 1996 ===
Sunday, 14 July 1996 is Anthony's last day in civilian clothes before his long-term voluntary enlistment in the army, which is the only way he could find to get away from Heillange and his family. He longs to get away from both from his depressed and overprotective mother and from his father, who has once again relapsed into alcoholism.

This also the first time in almost two years that Steph has returned home, after leaving to study in Paris at a private preparatory school. We learn that, despite a difficult start, Steph is succeeding in her academics.

Hacine, now out of the drug trade and in a relationship with Coralie, wants to rest after his week working on the social housing renovation sites in the town. All of Heillange gathers for the fireworks (and the dance that follows) by the lake where, inevitably, these three clash again. There is also a calm confrontation between Anthony and Hacine, and another, more intense one between Steph and Anthony, who will finally be able to get what he has been waiting for for years.

=== IV. I Will Survive - 1998 ===
On 8 July 1998, all of France was behind its football team for the World Cup semi-final match against Croatia. There was also a buzz in Heillange, where residents flocked to the shopping center on the outskirts of town to buy televisions, flags, and beer. Anthony, now discharged from the army after a knee injury sustained playing football, wasn't immune either: he needed his big flat-screen TV, even if it meant taking out another loan he could hardly repay on his temporary worker's salary. The same was true for Hacine, who had just bought a Suzuki TS 125 motorcycle, despite his minimum-wage salesman income, which barely supported his family, now with the addition of a baby girl. The purchase provoked Coralie's anger, who gave him an ultimatum to get a grip.

The two young men meet again at the L'Usine bar, where they've come to watch the second half of the match. After a moment of surprise and hesitation, they finally strike up a conversation on this festive evening celebrating the diverse ethnicities of the region, and at Anthony's insistence, they go for a motorcycle ride in a parking lot. He ends up stealing it from Hacine and rides to Steph's window, where she rudely rejects him; she's about to leave to join her partner in Canada to start a new life. Morose and depressed, Anthony invites his mother the next day for a picnic by the lake (where his father drowned, perhaps intentionally) before leaving the motorcycle in front of the store where Hacine works.

== Writing and development ==
Mathieu explored deindustrialization in the northeast of France in his first book, the hardboiled novel Aux animaux la guerre, published by Actes Sud through their "Actes Noirs" imprint. Mathieu chose to engage further with this topic for his second novel, although this time he portrayed children born near the end of the 1970s, as he had been, who were teenagers in the 1990s. Beyond his experience writing about the topic of deindustrialization in his first novel and his desire to explore it further, Mathieu was prodded to write the book by the 2013 movie Mud (Dir. Jeff Nichols, 2012). In particular, the author cites the opening scene, which features two adolescents, as inspirational.

Mathieu sought to anchor his writing in real "society and politics". This desire reflects the goals of 19th-century French writers, such as Honoré de Balzac and Émile Zola, as well as contemporary authors, including Annie Ernaux.

He also drew from his experience as a clerk at works council meetings of bankrupt companies undergoing restructuring plans to observe the decay of the French industrial fabric and the struggle between workers and management. (Note: This theme of management struggle recurs in Mathieu's novel Connemara.)

He took Hayange and the Fensch Valley as his model, "fascinated by the rusting blast furnaces that still dominate the town." Moreover, he had his own experience to draw from, growing up in the Jeanne-d'Arc suburban housing estate in Golbey, near Épinal in the Vosges. He described his own "feeling of downward mobility" and "humiliation" during his private schooling, with the desire to escape his background—and later as a young adult who went to study in Nancy and Metz.

Mathieu started writing the novel, while still working part-time for a non-profit environmental regulation agency, with the intention of making it into a crime noir like his first book, but as we engaged with the prose and characters, he realized that he wanted to go in a different direction. Thus, the novel became "a coming-of-age chronicle" of a handful of young lives, "an epic in a valley."

The title of the work is derived from a quotation in the Book of Sirach, one of the books of the Old Testament, which serves as an epigraph to the novel:

“There are some of whom there is no more memory,

They perished as though they had never existed;

They became as though they had never been born,

And so did their children after them.”

— Sirach 44:9

By choosing this title, the author deliberately places himself in the tradition of Let Us Now Praise Famous Men (1941), the famous book by James Agee, whose title is also taken from the same book, albeit a different verse (Sirach 44:1) – “Let us now praise illustrious men, and the fathers of our race” - and it is from that verse that interpretation derives the “they” in the title of Mathieu’s novel. Agee's book focused on the oppressed sharecroppers of the American South, the poorest social group in the rural world, during the Great Depression. Mathieu thus draws inspiration, "like a compass," from this "documentary and poetic" work for his own novel about the last representatives of the working class, also seeking to situate it within a "genealogy stretching back to the Bible and Antiquity." If these "small lives" (like the Lives of the Little People in the Bible, but also those in Pierre Michon's book, Small Lives) do not go down in History, they are nonetheless etched in memory, in addition to the importance of having been lived.

Mathieu explains that his literary project also focuses heavily on the description of sensations and desire, perceptions and bodies in order to make readers experience them. This includes the discovery of love, sexuality, and boundaries among teenagers, the boredom of rural France, and the characters' relationship to their environment during the 1990s, that is, before the advent of social media and addictive mobile technologies. He states that the most autobiographical part of his book is the "theme of unrequited love, which was the common thread, the central motif of [his] teenage years," with all the violence that entails.

The final aspect concerns the use of songs—whether in the chapter divisions, which they title, or through their presence throughout the narrative.

== Reception ==
Kirkus Reviews: "Mathieu captures the vulnerability and awkwardness of adolescence with painful acuity as the teenagers struggle to find their ways in the world. But his interest extends further, to their families and the place itself; characters and setting are inextricable, as the book's best writing reveals ... A gritty, expansive coming-of-age novel filled with sex and violence that manages to be tender, even wryly hopeful."

Edward Ousselin, in The French Review, said that the characters and circumstances, though set in eastern France in the 1990s, could easily reflect those of the American rust belt in many ways. Ousselin called Mathieu's writing "gritty" and socially realistic, with his salient characteristic being a idiosyncratic use of slang interwoven with standard French.

Boyd Tonkin wrote in The Financial Times (UK) that Mathieu's second novel put him in alignment with writers like Édouard Louis and Didier Eribon. Boyd also wrote that Mathieu's "rapt attention to the humdrum" recalls something of the "forensic gaze of Michel Houellebecq," although Mathieu's style is perhaps "more lovable." Tonkin also found in Mathieu's writing something of the naturalism of Émile Zola and "the halflyrical, half-prophetic tone" of D.H. Lawrence. "Then again," Boyd wrote, "you might think of a Ken Loach movie with a soundtrack by Bruce Springsteen; especially as William Rodarmor's salty and supple translation lends to Anthony and his pals the smartass, vulnerable voices of American, not British, rustbelt teens."

=== Awards ===
Mathieu received his first award, the 2018 Feuille d'Or prize, presented by Lorraine media outlets at the "Livre sur la Place" book fair in Nancy on 7 September 2018.

During the fall 2018 literary season, the novel was shortlisted for two of the major literary prizes in France: the Prix Goncourt, and the Prix Médicis, as well as the Prix Goncourt des Lycéens, the Prix France Culture-Télérama, and the Prix de Flore.

The novel received the Prix Goncourt on 7 November 2018. In November 2021, the English translation won the Albertine Prize, a readers' choice prize administered by the French embassy in the USA.

The Académie Française, meeting at the Drouant restaurant on 7 November 2018, awarded him the Prix Goncourt on the fourth ballot by six votes to four for Paul Greveillac's Maîtres et Esclaves.

By general consensus, Leurs enfants après eux was not the favorite – especially after Éric Vuillard won the prize for L'Ordre du jour, published the previous year by Actes Sud, marking the third Goncourt Prize in four years (and the fourth in seven) for this publishing house. (Albeit, there were Académie Française members, such as Philippe Claudel and Virginie Despentes, who had been strongly inclined to choose Mathieu's novel. Yet, the story of a Senegalese rifleman in David Diop's Frère d'âme, shortlisted for all the major French literary prizes, was the most widely cited contender for the Goncourt during the period of centennial commemoration of the end of the First World War. After three rounds of voting failed to produce a majority, it was Bernard Pivot who broke the deadlock by voting for the novel, even though it was not his first choice.

== Adaptations ==
=== Film ===
The novel was adapted into the 2024 film of the same name directed by Ludovic and Zoran Boukherma, starring Paul Kircher in the lead role.

=== Theatre ===
At the Théâtre du Peuple de Bussang, in the summer of 2021, thirteen young actors from the graduating class of École nationale supérieure des arts et techniques du théâtre in Lyon. The production was directed by Simon Delétang.

The novel was adapted again for the theatre in January 2022. Hugo Roux directed the production for the company Demain dès l'aube, with set design by Juliette Desproges, at the Théâtre Maurice-Novarina in Thonon-les-Bains. This production went on tour, with a performance at the Festival d'Avignon "Off" Festival at Théâtre 11 in July 2022.

== External links / further reading ==
- When White Working-Class Fury Came of Age by Thomas Chatterton Williams, The New York Times, 7 April 2020.
- Communities that previously lamented their isolation have found that it has helped spare them from the worst of the outbreak by James McAuley, The Washington Post, 11 May 2020. Quote: “People are supporting each other,” said novelist Nicolas Mathieu, who wrote about the forgotten corners of France in his 2018 novel, “And Their Children After Them.” He has spent the lockdown in a house in Nancy, a midsize city in eastern France. “Between neighbors, asking if they need anything, etc. I’m sure that exists in Paris, as well. But the other day, while doing errands, I found something on the ground in front of the cashier’s station. It was a little note, and it read, ‘Thank you for doing this for the building,’ and clearly someone had indeed done all the shopping for an entire building. That says it all.”
