= Albertine Prize =

French literary award

- Awarded for: A popular work of French writing translated into English.
- Description: A literary award for French writing in translation in the United States.
- Sponsored by: Van Cleef & Arpels
- Presented by: Cultural Services of the French Embassy in the United States
- Rewards: $10,000 (split 80/20 between author and translator)
- Established: 2017
- Website: albertine.com/prize/
- Related: Albertine Prize Jeunesse

The Albertine Prize is a French literary award granted to French writing in translation that has been publicly recognised in the United States of America. It is awarded by the Cultural Services of the French Embassy in the United States of America, with financial support from Van Cleef & Arpels.

== History ==
The Albertine Prize was constituted as a readers' choice award, to recognize popular works written in French and translated to English, with an American audience. The purpose of the prize was to establish recognition for contemporary French literature, in translation in the United States. The Prize is awarded from the Albertine Bookstore, which was established by Antonin Baudry, then Cultural Counselor for the French Embassy, in New York.

A selection committee nominates a shortlist of novels each year, and readers vote for the winner on the website of the Albertine Bookstore. The winner is awarded a prize of $10,000 prize, which is divided 80-20 between the author and translator.

In addition to the Albertine Prize, the Albertine Prize Jeunesse is awarded to books for young readers, and the winner is chosen by children between the ages of 3 and 14, grouped into four categories by age.

== List of nominees and winners ==
=== 2021 ===
2021 nominees:

| | Author | Title | Translator | Publication Information |
|---|---|---|---|---|
| Winner | Nicolas Mathieu | And Their Children After Them | William Rodarmor | Other Press |
| Shortlisted | Louis-Philippe Dalembert | The Mediterranean Wall | Marjolijn de Jager | Schaffner Press |
| Shortlisted | Pauline Delabroy-Allard | They Say Sarah | Adriana Hunter | Other Press |
| Shortlisted | Emmanuelle Bayamack-Tam | Arcadia | Ruth Diver | Seven Stories Press |
| Shortlisted | Emmanuel Dongala | The Bridgetower Sonata: Sonata Mulattica | Marjolijn de Jager | Schaffner Press |

=== 2020 ===
The Selection Committee for the 2020 Prize included staff of the Albertine Bookstore, the Book Department in the French Embassy, French literary critic François Busnel and American writer Rachel Kushner. The shortlist was announced on 14 October 2020 and voting remained open until 24 November 2020.

| | Author | Title | Translator | Publication Information |
|---|---|---|---|---|
| | Jean-Baptiste Del Amo | Animalia | Frank Wynne | Grove, 2019 |
| | Yannick Haenel | Hold Fast Your Crown | Teresa Fagan | Other Press, 2019 |
| | Lyonel Trouillot | Kannjawou | Gretchen Schmid | Schaffner Press, 2019 |
| | Virginie Despentes | Vernon Subutex 1 | Frank Wynne | Farrar, Straus and Giroux, 2019 |
| Winner | Zahia Rahmani | “Muslim” : A Novel | Matt Reeck | Deep Vellum, 2019 |

=== 2019 ===
The panel that shortlisted books for the 2019 prize included staff of the Albertine Bookstore, the Book Department in the French Embassy, French literary critic François Bushnel and American writer Lydia Davis.

| | Author | Title | Translator | Publication Information |
|---|---|---|---|---|
| Winner | Negar Djavadi | Disoriental | Tina Kover | Europa Editions, 2018 |
| Shortlisted | Gaël Faye | Small Country | Sarah Ardizzone | Hogarth Press, 2016 |
| Shortlisted | Éric Vuillard | The Order of the Day | Mark Polizzotti | Other Press, 2018 |
| Shortlisted | Leïla Slimani | The Perfect Nanny | Sam Taylor | Penguin Books 2018 |
| Shortlisted | Nathacha Appanah | Waiting for Tomorrow | Geoffrey Strachan | Graywolf Press, 2018 |

=== 2018 ===
The panel that shortlisted books for the 2018 prize included staff of the Albertine Bookstore, the Book Department in the French Embassy, French literary critic François Bushnel and American writer Lydia Davis.

| | Author | Title | Translator | Publication Information |
|---|---|---|---|---|
| Winner | Anne Garreta | Not One Day | Emma Ramadan | Deep Vellum Press, 2017 |
| Shortlisted | Alain Mabanckou | Black Moses | Helen Stevenson | The New Press, 2017 |
| Shortlisted | Mathias Énard | Compass | Charlotte Mandell | New Directions Publishing, 2017 |
| Shortlisted | Édouard Louis | The End of Eddy | Michael Lucey | Farrar, Straus and Giroux, 2017 |
| Shortlisted | Christine Angot | Incest | Tess Lewis | Archipelago Books, 2017 |

=== 2017 ===
The panel that shortlisted books for the 2018 prize included staff of the Albertine Bookstore, the Book Department in the French Embassy, French literary critic François Bushnel and American writer Lydia Davis.

| | Author | Title | Translator | Publication Information |
|---|---|---|---|---|
| Winner | Antoine Volodine | Bardo Or Not Bardo | J.T. Mahany | Open Letter Books, 2017 |
| Shortlisted | Ananda Devi | Eve Out of Her Ruins | Jeffrey Zuckerman | Deep Vellum, 2016 |
| Shortlisted | Maylis De Kerangal | The Heart | Sam Taylor | Farrar, Straus and Giroux, 2016 |
