= And Their Children After Them (film) =

2024 film by Ludovic and Zoran Boukherma

- Theatrical release poster
- French: Leurs enfants après eux
- Directed by: Ludovic Boukherma; Zoran Boukherma
- Screenplay by: Ludovic Boukherma; Zoran Boukherma
- Based on: And Their Children After Them by Nicolas Mathieu
- Produced by: Hugo Sélignac; Alain Attal
- Starring: Paul Kircher; Angelina Woreth; Sayyid El Alami; Gilles Lellouche; Ludivine Sagnier
- Cinematography: Augustin Barbaroux
- Edited by: Géraldine Mangenot
- Music by: Amaury Chabauty
- Production companies: Chi-Fou-Mi Productions; Trésor Films; France 3 Cinéma
- Distributed by: Warner Bros. Pictures
- Release dates: 31 August 2024 (Venice); 4 December 2024 (France)
- Running time: 144 minutes
- Country: France
- Language: French
- Budget: €12 million
- Box office: $2.3 million

And Their Children After Them (French: Leurs enfants après eux) is a 2024 French coming-of-age drama film written and directed by Ludovic Boukherma and Zoran Boukherma. It is an adaptation of the 2018 novel of the same name by Nicolas Mathieu. It stars Paul Kircher, Angelina Woreth, Sayyid El Alami, Gilles Lellouche and Ludivine Sagnier.

The film premiered on 31 August 2024 at the 81st Venice International Film Festival, where Kircher won the Marcello Mastroianni Award. It won the top prize (Giraldillo de Oro) in 2024 at Spain's Seville European Film Festival.

== Plot ==
A coming-of-age story following three teenagers across four summers in a small deindustrialized town in the northeast of France between 1992 and 1999.

== Cast ==
- Paul Kircher as Anthony Casati
- Angelina Woreth as Stéphanie Chaussoy
- Sayyid El Alami as Hacine Bouali
- Gilles Lellouche as Patrick Casati
- Ludivine Sagnier as Hélène Casati
- Louis Memmi as Anthony's cousin
- Christine Gautier as Vanessa
- Anouk Villemin as Clémence Durupt
- Lounès Tazaïrt as Malek Bouali
- Victor Kervern as Romain Rotier
- Thibault Bonenfant as Simon Rotier
- Bilel Chegrani as Kader
- Barbara Butch as Irène
- Raphaël Quenard as Manu
- Brice Fournier as Pierre Chaussoy
- Anna Biolay as Anthony's cousin
- Anaïs Tellenne as Cyrille
- Amaury Chabauty as Christophe
- Louise Lehry as Nath

== Production ==
And Their Children After Them is an adaptation of Nicolas Mathieu's 2018 novel of the same name, which received the prestigious Prix Goncourt.

The film is produced by Hugo Sélignac for Chi-Fou-Mi Productions and by Alain Attal for Trésor Films, in co-production with France 3 Cinéma. According to the producers, Nicolas Mathieu had been approached by many others filmmakers who were interested in producing "naturalistic adaptations". They won him over with their promise of an ambitious project in the style of Paul Thomas Anderson and Martin Scorsese, with Romanesque qualities.

Principal photography began on 25 July and took place in France's Grand Est region, including in the Fensch valley (Moselle) and in the Vosges. The 55-day shoot with Augustin Barbaroux as director of photography was wrapped on 10 October 2023, on the pier of the Lac de Pierre-Percée (Meurthe-et-Moselle).

== Release ==
And Their Children After Them had its world premiere on 31 August 2024 as part of the official competition at the 81st Venice International Film Festival. The film was originally set to be released theatrically in France by Warner Bros. Pictures on 18 September 2024, but the release date was pushed back to 4 December 2024. French and international sales are handled by Paris-based company Charades.

== Reception ==
=== Critical response ===
Metacritic, which uses a weighted average, assigned the film a score of 57 out of 100, based on 6 critics, indicating "mixed or average" reviews.

=== Awards and nominations ===
Award	Date of ceremony	Category	Recipient(s)	Result	Ref.
Lumière Awards	20 January 2025	Best Actor	Paul Kircher	Nominated	
Lumière Awards	20 January 2025	Best Male Revelation	Sayyid El Alami	Nominated	
Lumière Awards	20 January 2025	Best Music	Amaury Chabauty	Nominated	
Seville European Film Festival	16 November 2024	Golden Giraldillo	Ludovic Boukherma and Zoran Boukherma	Won	
Seville European Film Festival	16 November 2024	Best Actor	Paul Kircher	Won	
Venice Film Festival	7 September 2024	Golden Lion	Ludovic Boukherma and Zoran Boukherma	Nominated	
Venice Film Festival	7 September 2024	Marcello Mastroianni Award	Paul Kircher	Won	
