= Connemara (novel) =

2022 novel by Nicolas Mathieu

- Author: Nicolas Mathieu
- Translator: Sam Taylor
- Language: French
- Subject: Corporate culture, social tension, midlife crisis, nostalgia, melancholy, marriage & divorce, family life
- Genre: Literary fiction, Psychological fiction
- Set in: Vosges
- Publisher: Actes Sud, Other Press
- Publication date: February 2022
- English publication date: March 2024
- Pages: 464
- ISBN: 978-1-6354-2356-3
- OCLC: 1385295051

Connemara is a novel by Nicolas Mathieu published in February 2022. The fourth novel by the author, and the third to be translated into English for publication in the United States, the book focuses on establishing a portrait of adults in their forties in Nancy. It follows Mathieu's pattern of social criticism about the peri-urban areas of northeastern France devastated by deindustrialization. The two main characters, Hélène and Christophe, who knew each other as teenagers, are reunited in the present (2010–2015) in a romantic but melancholic story with nostalgic themes reflective of Mathieu's adolescence in the 1990s. The two protagonists represent contrasting socioeconomic trajectories. It is translated into English by Sam Taylor.

== Background and research ==
The title refers to the song by Michel Sardou, "Les Lacs du Connemara," from the album of the same name (1981). Its meaning symbolizes the use of the song culturally in France across social classes.

The novel also examines the corporate culture of management consulting, the field in which the leading female character, Hélène, works. Mathieu met with numerous consultants during the preparatory phase of writing the novel. The novel interestingly ancipated, albeit inadvertently, the McKinsey Affair. (Note: L'Affaire McKinsey, or McKinsey Affair, also known as McKinseygate, was a scandal in French politics involving the political campaign of Emmanuel Macron from 2017 to 2022. The French article in Wikipedia (Affaire_McKinsey) gives more detail. For an overview in English, see: McKinsey Company/French presidential corruption scandal)

== Summary ==
In the 1990s, two school-aged teenagers crossed paths somewhere near Épinal, remote acquaintances with mutual ties. She, Hélène, was a serious, ambitious, if reticient student on the lycée track; he, Christophe, was a handsome, attractive, athletic hockey player for the Épinal Hockey Club.

Twenty years later, roughly 2010-2015, their paths cross again. They begin seeing each other, more or less secretly. A hockey player past his prime, he is now an effective salesman of dog food, still living in his hometown, with his dad and small son, Gabriel, when it's his turn in the custody arrangement. Hélène had left everything behind to try her luck in Paris, but now lives near Nancy, in an architect-designed villa, with her husband, Philippe, and their two daughters, Clara and Mouche. She works for a thriving human resources consulting firm, serving businesses, organizations, government agencies, and local authorities, and is poised for significant growth with the upcoming merger with a larger firm. Both her work and her personal life are disappointing, as Philippe is career-obsessed and doesn't share her disillusionment with societal structures.

The back-and-forth between these two periods allows the reader to follow the evolution of both the characters and the society and culture of the region.

== Critical reception ==
Critics noted the novel's atmosphere of melancholy and its portrayal of middle-aged disillusionment. Raphaëlle Leyris of Le Monde described the novel as dominated by melancholy while balancing social critique with reflections on memory and time. She said Mathieu's writing style accomplished the "impossible task of acting as a dam, of halting the flow of days by fixing its movement, of countering the debacle by also celebrating life's beauties."

It was moreover said in Ouest France that while the novel's title evokes "the scent of peat and damp grass," the story doesn't take place in Ireland. The title rather refers to the famous song by Michel Sardou, a cultural touchstone in France.

Laurence Houot of France Info put it more simply: "a woman and a man from the same small town in the Vosges mountains of Lorraine. One did everything she could to get away from it, the other stayed."

Fabienne Lemahieu of La Croix called it a beautiful novel about midlife, when much has been built but everything is still possible. Or almost."

Alain Léauthier of Marianne magazine wrote: "In a way, the entire narrative is constantly on the verge of erupting into a massive, enormous rage, for reasons that abound." He added that "things weren't necessarily better before, but tomorrow looks rather bleak" and that the male protagonist "tells himself he missed out on the best...(and that) those times will never come again."

Gabrielle Napoli (of En attendant Nadeau) emphasized the emotional life of the characters. "It's also difficult to pinpoint exactly what truly binds Hélène and Christophe. It's far from passion, and yet there was passion in Hélène when she discovered literature, an intense and forbidden passion that quickly vanished, for reasons unknown. There was sex, a lot of it, but without real passion (Hélène unfortunately hasn't experienced pure passion), and feelings, a little, more related to her adolescent past than to the relationship itself, which was, all things considered, quite empty."

France Today called the prose "poetic" and noted that it looks at "modern life, middle age, and how we measure success."

In the United States, literary reception focused on the macro. Fernanda Eberstadt of The New York Times Book Review suggested that the two main characters, in representing different strata of socioeconomic society, were a kind of microcosm for the broader cultural divides that were seen in the 2017 French presidential election.

== Adaptation ==
- Connemara (2025, dir. Alex Lutz)

This adaptation of the novel was a film selected for screening at the 2025 Cannes Film Festival. The film stars Mélanie Thierry and Bastien Bouillon in the leading roles.

Mathieu collaborated with Alex Lutz, the director, on the adaptation of the screenplay. The film was produced by the brothers Zoran and Ludovic Boukherma.

The film was released for the general public in December 2025.

== Related ==
- Aux Animaux la Guerre (another novel by Nicolas Mathieu)
- And Their Children After Them (the Prix Goncourt-winning novel (2018) by Mathieu)
- And Their Children After Them (film) (adaptation based on Mathieu's best-known work)
- Transclass
- Edouard Louis
- Annie Ernaux
