= Vuillard (surname) =

Vuillard is a surname. Notable people with this surname include:

- Édouard Vuillard (1868-1940), French painter and printmaker
- Éric Vuillard (born 1968), French writer and film director
- Joseph Vuillard, French rower
