= Deauville American Film Festival =

Film festival

Coordinates: 49°22′N 0°05′E

- Location: Deauville, France
- Founded: 1975
- Language: English, French
- Website: festival-deauville.com

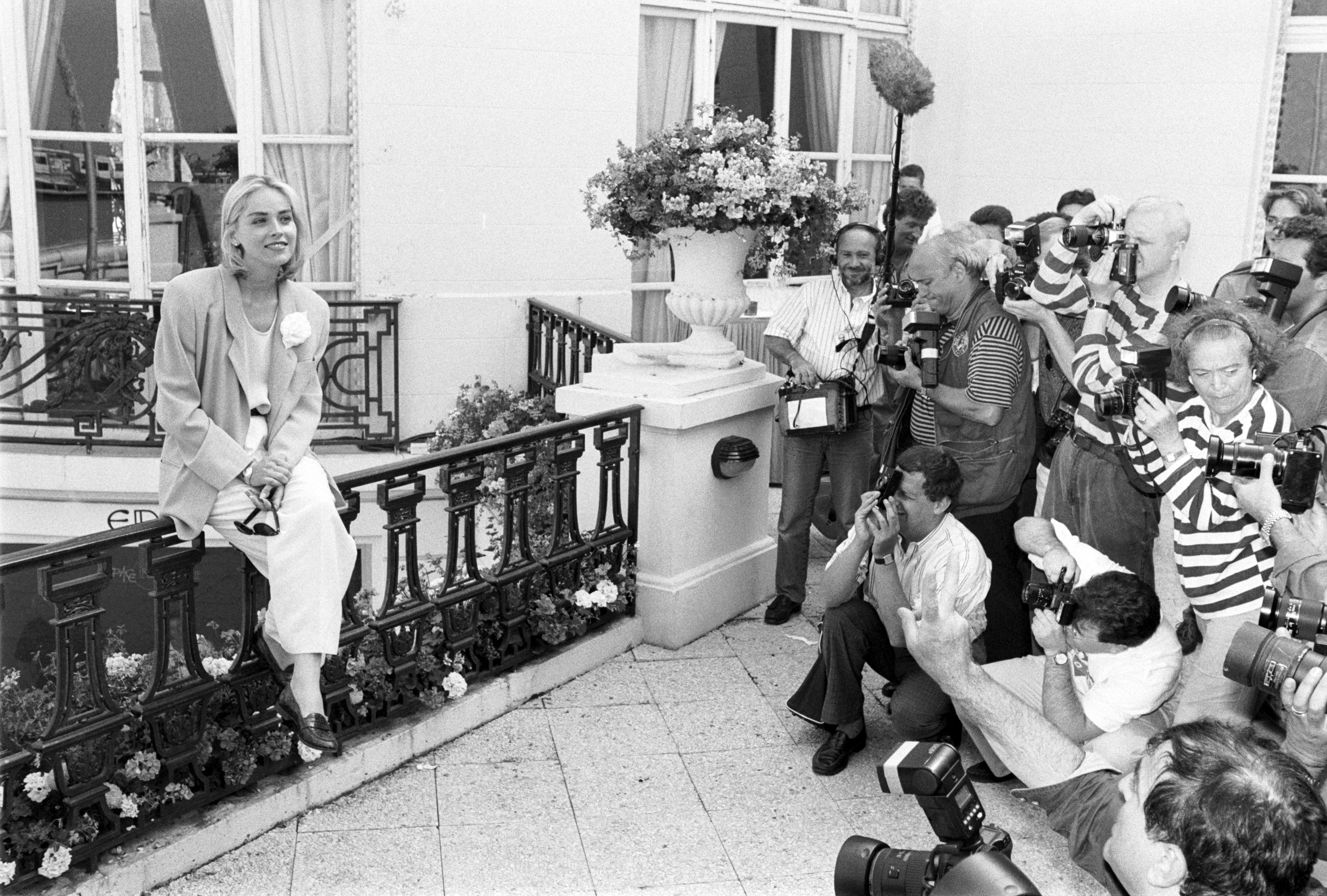
Sharon Stone at the 1991 Deauville American Film Festival

The Deauville American Film Festival (French: Festival du cinéma américain de Deauville) is a yearly film festival devoted to American cinema, which has taken place since 1975 in Deauville, France.

It was established by Lionel Chouchan, André Halimi, and then Mayor of Deauville Michel d'Ornano, with support from the Groupe Lucien Barrière in providing a luxurious setting for the Festival. Although not competitive at its origin, the festival began to award prizes for feature films in 1995 and short films in 1998.

In 1992, the city built a convention center to host the annual festival.

== Awards ==
=== Grand Prix ===
This award was named Grand Prix spécial Deauville from 1995 to 2007 and Grand Prix du cinéma indépendant américain in 1998 and 1999.

Year	Film	Director
1995	Living in Oblivion	Tom DiCillo
1996	The Daytrippers	Greg Mottola
1997	Sunday	Jonathan Nossiter
1998	Next Stop Wonderland	Brad Anderson
1999	Being John Malkovich	Spike Jonze
2000	Girlfight	Karyn Kusama
2001	Hedwig and the Angry Inch	John Cameron Mitchell
2002	Raising Victor Vargas	Peter Sollett
2003	What Alice Found	A. Dean Bell
2004	Maria Full of Grace	Joshua Marston
2005	Crash	Paul Haggis
2006	Little Miss Sunshine	Jonathan Dayton and Valerie Faris
2007	The Dead Girl	Karen Moncrieff
2008	The Visitor	Tom McCarthy
2009	The Messenger	Oren Moverman
2010	Mother and Child	Rodrigo García
2011	Take Shelter	Jeff Nichols
2012	Beasts of the Southern Wild	Benh Zeitlin
2013	Night Moves	Kelly Reichardt
2014	Whiplash	Damien Chazelle
2015	99 Homes	Ramin Bahrani
2016	Little Men	Ira Sachs
2017	The Rider	Chloé Zhao
2018	Thunder Road	Jim Cummings
2019	Bull	Annie Silverstein
2020	The Nest	Sean Durkin
2021	Down With the King	Diego Ongaro
2022	Aftersun	Charlotte Wells
2023	LaRoy, Texas	Shane Atkinson
2024	In the Summers	Alessandra Lacorazza Samudio
2025	The Plague	Charlie Polinger

=== Prix du Jury ===
The award was called Prix du jury spécial Deauville ('Special Deauville Jury Award') from 1995 through 1997 and Prix spécial du jury du cinéma indépendant américain ('Special Jury Award of American Independent Film') in 1998 and 1999.

Year	Film	Director
1995	Denise Calls Up	Hal Salwen
1995	The Brothers McMullen	Edward Burns
1996	Bound	The Wachowskis
1996	Welcome to the Dollhouse	Todd Solondz
1997	In the Company of Men	Neil LaBute
1997	Ulee's Gold	Victor Nuñez
1998	High Art	Lisa Cholodenko
1999	Twin Falls Idaho	Michael Polish
1999	Guinevere	Audrey Wells
2000	Memento	Christopher Nolan
2000	Boiler Room	Ben Younger
2001	Ghost World	Terry Zwigoff
2002	One Hour Photo	Mark Romanek
2002	L.I.E.	Michael Cuesta
2003	Thirteen	Catherine Hardwicke
2004	The Woodsman	Nicole Kassell
2005	On the Outs	Lori Silverbush and Michael Skolnik
2005	Keane	Lodge Kerrigan
2006	Half Nelson	Ryan Fleck
2007	Never Forever	Gina Kim
2008	Ballast	Lance Hammer
2009	Precious	Lee Daniels
2010	Winter's Bone	Debra Granik
2010	The Myth of the American Sleepover	David Robert Mitchell
2011	The Dynamiter	Matthew Gordon
2012	Una Noche	Lucy Mulloy
2013	All Is Lost	J. C. Chandor
2013	Stand Clear of the Closing Doors	Sam Fleischner
2014	The Good Lie	Philippe Falardeau
2015	Tangerine	Sean S. Baker
2016	Captain Fantastic	Matt Ross
2016	Wiener-Dog	Todd Solondz
2017	A Ghost Story	David Lowery
2017	Menashe	Joshua Z Weinstein
2020	First Cow	Kelly Reichardt
2020	Lorelei	Sabrina Doyle
2021	Red Rocket	Sean Baker
2021	Pleasure	Ninja Thyberg
2022	War Pony	Gina Gammell and Riley Keough
2022	Palm Trees and Power Lines	Jamie Dack
2025	Omaha	Cole Webley
2025	Olmo	Fernando Eimbcke

=== Prix du Public ===
The winner of the Deauville Audience Award is chosen by the festival attendees.

- 1989: Torch Song Trilogy by Paul Bogart
- 1990 (tied):
  - Pump Up the Volume by Allan Moyle
  - Tune in Tomorrow by Jon Amiel
- 1991 (tied):
  - Trust by Hal Hartley
  - Hangin' with the Homeboys by Joseph B. Vasquez
- 1992: In the Soup by Alexandre Rockwell
- 1993 (tied):
  - El Mariachi by Robert Rodriguez
  - Naked in New York by Daniel Algrant
  - Hold Me, Thrill Me, Kiss Me by Joel Hershman
- 1994 (tied):
  - Go Fish by Rose Troche
  - Clerks by Kevin Smith
- 1995: Living in Oblivion by Tom DiCillo
- 1997: The Myth of Fingerprints by Bart Freundlich
- 1998: Next Stop Wonderland by Brad Anderson
- 2000: Songcatcher by Maggie Greenwald
- 2001: Jump Tomorrow by Joel Hopkins
- 2002: One Hour Photo by Mark Romanek
- 2003: Dot the i by Matthew Parkhill
- 2004: Maria Full of Grace by Joshua Marston
- 2013: Fruitvale Station by Ryan Coogler
- 2014: Whiplash by Damien Chazelle
- 2015: Dope by Rick Famuyiwa
- 2016: Captain Fantastic by Matt Ross
- 2017: Gifted by Marc Webb
- 2019: The Peanut Butter Falcon by Tyler Nilson & Michael Schwartz
- 2020: Uncle Franck by Alan Ball
- 2022: Emily the Criminal by John Patton Ford
- 2023: LaRoy, Texas directed by Shane Atkinson

=== Prix de la Critique Internationale ===
The International Critics' prize is an award presented at the festival.

- 1987: Hollywood Shuffle by Robert Townsend
- 1988: Patti Rocks by David Burton Morris
- 1989: Signs of Life by John David Coles
- 1990 (tied):
  - Metropolitan by Whit Stillman
  - Tune in Tomorrow by Jon Amiel
- 1991: My Own Private Idaho by Gus Van Sant
- 1992: Gas Food Lodging by Allison Anders
- 1993 (tied):
  - Public Access by Bryan Singer
  - The Wedding Banquet by Ang Lee,
- 1994 (tied):
  - Federal Hill by Michael Corrente
  - Little Odessa by James Gray
- 1995: Swimming with Sharks by George Huang
- 1996: Bound by The Wachowskis
- 1997: Sunday by Jonathan Nossiter
- 1998: Gods and Monsters by Bill Condon
- 1999: Being John Malkovich by Spike Jonze
- 2000: Memento by Christopher Nolan
- 2001: Hedwig and the Angry Inch by John Cameron Mitchell
- 2002: The Safety of Objects by Rose Troche
- 2003: American Splendor by Shari Springer Berman and Robert Pulcini
- 2004: Maria Full of Grace by Joshua Marston
- 2005: Keane by Lodge Kerrigan
- 2006: Sherrybaby by Laurie Collyer
- 2007: Grace Is Gone by James C. Strouse
- 2008: Gardens of the Night by Damian Harris
- 2009: The Messenger by Oren Moverman
- 2010: Buried by Rodrigo Cortés
- 2011: Detachment by Tony Kaye
- 2012: The We and the I by Michel Gondry
- 2013: The Retrieval by Chris Eska
- 2014: It Follows by David Robert Mitchell
- 2015: Krisha by Trey Edward Schultz
- 2016: The Fits by Anna Rose Holmer
- 2017: A Ghost Story by David Lowery
- 2020 : The Nest by Sean Durkin
- 2021: Red Rocket directed by Sean Baker
- 2022: Aftersun directed by Charlotte Wells
- 2023: LaRoy, Texas directed by Shane Atkinson
- 2024: Color Book directed by David Fortune
- 2025: The Plague directed by Charlie Polinger

=== Prix d'Ornano-Valenti ===
The Prix d'Ornano-Valenti (previously Prix Michel d'Ornano) is awarded annually to a debut French film. It carries a grant of 3,000 euros for the awarded director-writer, 3,000 euros for the film's producer, and 10,000 euros for the French distributor to help promote the film. The award, which is named in honour of the former Mayor of Deauville and co-founder of the festival, Michel d'Ornano, is supported by the Franco-American Cultural Fund.

- 1992: Claire Aziza for Les Aiguilleurs
- 1993: Hélène Woillot for Quand j'ai vu la chimère
- 1994: Marie-Hélène Saller for Les Leçons du Mardi
- 1995: Gilles Malençon for Le Bout du fleuve
- 1996 (tied):
  - Christophe Mordellet for Silhouette
  - Éric Vernhes for Le Grand Projet
- 1997: Gilles Malençon for L'Élue
- 1998: Siegfried for Louise (Take 2)
- 1999: Stéphane Brizé and Florence Vignon for Le Bleu des villes
- 2000: Virginie Wagon and Érick Zonca for Le Secret
- 2001: Gilles Paquet-Brenner for Pretty Things
- 2002: Claude Duty for Filles perdues, cheveux gras
- 2003: Julie Bertuccelli for Since Otar Left
- 2004: Éléonore Faucher and Gaëlle Macé for A Common Thread
- 2005: Karin Albou for Little Jerusalem
- 2006: Julie Gavras for Blame It on Fidel
- 2007: Marc Fitoussi for La Vie d'artiste
- 2008: Jean-Stéphane Sauvaire for Johnny Mad Dog
- 2009: Léa Fehner for Silent Voice
- 2010: Alix Delaporte for Angel & Tony
- 2011: Delphine and Muriel Coulin for 17 Girls
- 2012: Rachid Djaïdani for Hold Back
- 2013: Guillaume Gallienne for Me, Myself and Mum
- 2014: Jeanne Herry for Elle l'adore
- 2015: Thomas Bidegain for The Cowboys
- 2016: Ludovic Boukherma, Zoran Boukherma, Marielle Gautier and Hugo P. Thomas for Willy 1er
- 2017: Léonor Serraille for Jeune Femme
- 2020: Charlène Favier for Slalom
- 2021: Vincent Maël Cardona for Les Magnetiques
- 2022: Charlotte Le Bon for Falcon Lake

=== Prix de la Révélation ===
The Revelation Prize recognises an original work by a promising new filmmaker and is awarded by a Revelation jury composed of up-and-coming actors and filmmakers.

- 2006: Half Nelson by Ryan Fleck
- 2007: Rocket Science by Jeffrey Blitz
- 2008: Ballast by Lance Hammer
- 2009: The Messenger by Oren Moverman
- 2010: Holy Rollers by Kevin Asch
- 2011: Detachment by Tony Kaye
- 2012: Beasts of the Southern Wild by Benh Zeitlin
- 2013: Fruitvale Station by Ryan Coogler
- 2014: A Girl Walks Home Alone at Night by Ana Lily Amirpour
- 2015: James White by Josh Mond
- 2016: Wiener-Dog by Todd Solondz
- 2017: A Ghost Story by David Lowery
- 2020: The Nest by Sean Durkin
- 2021: John and the Hole by Pascual Sisto
- 2022: War Pony by Gina Gammell and Riley Keough
- 2025: The Chronology of Water by Kristen Stewart

=== Prix du Scénario ===
The Screenplay Prize was awarded in 2004, 2005 and 2006, and then discontinued.

- 2004: The Final Cut by Omar Naim
- 2005: Transamerica by Duncan Tucker
- 2006: Sherrybaby by Laurie Collyer

== The Jury ==
- 1995 : Andrei Konchalovsky (president), Anouk Aimée, Michael Lonsdale, Claudie Ossard, René Bonnell, Valérie Kaprisky, Steven Zaillian, Mathilda May, Élie Chouraqui and Yvan Attal.
- 1996 : Charlotte Rampling (president), Sabine Azéma, René Cleitman, Dominique Farrugia, Charlotte Gainsbourg, Chiara Mastroianni, Laura Morante, Ornella Muti, Melvil Poupaud and Alain Rocca.
- 1997 : Sophie Marceau (president), Élodie Bouchez, Philippe Carcassonne, Étienne Chatiliez, Alain Finkielkraut, John Hurt, Michèle Laroque, Inés Sastre, Nathalie Quintane and Lambert Wilson.
- 1998 : Jean-Paul Rappeneau (president), Michèle Halberstadt, Sandrine Kiberlain, Virginie Ledoyen, Russell Banks, Maurice Bernart, Alessandro Gassmann, Ewan McGregor, Liam Neeson, Éric Serra and Christian Vincent (director).
- 1999 : Régis Wargnier (president), Jean-Hugues Anglade, Humbert Balsan, Richard Berry, Gabriel Byrne, Jean-Pierre Dionnet, Marie Gillain, Michel Houellebecq, Marie-France Pisier and Elsa Zylberstein.
- 2000 : Neil Jordan (president), Guillaume Canet, Clotilde Courau, Tchéky Karyo, Philippe Labro, Samuel Le Bihan, François Ozon, Vincent Perez, Danièle Thompson and Marie Trintignant.
- 2001 : Jean-Jacques Annaud (president), Sandrine Bonnaire, Marion Cotillard, Arielle Dombasle, Gérard Darmon, Jean-Pierre Jeunet, Darius Khondji, Benoît Poelvoorde and Gabriel Yared.
- 2002 : Pierre Lescure (president), Chantal Akerman, Richard Anconina, Jean-Marc Barr, Charles Berling, Amira Casar, Julie Gayet, Irène Jacob, Cédric Kahn and Bruno Wolkowitch.
- 2003 : Roman Polanski (president), Claudia Cardinale, Paweł Edelman, Jacques Fieschi, Ben Kingsley, Anne Parillaud, Zbigniew Preisner, Ludivine Sagnier, Fernando Trueba and Tom Tykwer.
- 2004 : Claude Lelouch (president), Anouk Aimée, Marie-Josée Croze, Danièle Heymann, Diane Kurys, Jeanne Labrune, Lio, Claudie Ossard, Bettina Rheims and Mathilde Seigner.
- 2005 : Alain Corneau (president), Enki Bilal, Dominique Blanc, Romane Bohringer, Rachida Brakni, Christophe, Dominik Moll, Melvil Poupaud and Brigitte Roüan.
- 2006 : Nicole Garcia (president), Maurice Barthélémy, Guillaume Canet, Amira Casar, Emmanuelle Castro, Antoine de Caunes, Julien Clerc, Philippe Djian and Marthe Keller.
- 2007 : André Téchiné (president), Odile Barski, Xavier Beauvois, Nicolas Cazalé, Charlélie Couture, Émilie Deleuze, Anouk Grinberg and Marie-France Pisier.
- 2008 : Carole Bouquet (president), Édouard Baer, Ronit Elkabetz, Diane Fleri, Pierre Jolivet, Cédric Kahn, Cristian Mungiu, Leonor Silveira and Dean Tavoularis.
- 2009 : Jean-Pierre Jeunet (president), Hiam Abbass, Dany Boon, Jean-Loup Dabadie, Émilie Dequenne, Déborah François, Sandrine Kiberlain, Patrice Leconte, Géraldine Pailhas and Bruno Podalydès.
- 2010 : Emmanuelle Béart (president), Lucas Belvaux, Jeanne Balibar, Faouzi Bensaïdi, Christine Citti, Fabrice Du Welz, Tony Gatlif, Denis Lavant and Abderrahmane Sissako.
- 2011 : Olivier Assayas (president), Nathalie Baye, Claire Denis, Nicolas Godin, Chiara Mastroianni, Angelin Preljocaj, Jean Rolin et Bruno Todeschini.
- 2012 : Sandrine Bonnaire (president), Clotilde Courau, Sami Bouajila, Christophe Honoré, Anaïs Demoustier, Alice Taglioni, Philippe Decouflé, Joann Sfar and Florent Emilio Siri.
- 2013 : Vincent Lindon (president), Lou Doillon, Jean Echenoz, Hélène Fillières, Xavier Giannoli, Famke Janssen, Pierre Lescure, Bruno Nuytten and Rebecca Zlotowski.
- 2014 : Costa-Gavras (president), Jean-Pierre Jeunet, Claude Lelouch, Pierre Lescure, Vincent Lindon, André Téchiné, Marie-Claude Pietragalla
- 2015 : Benoît Jacquot (president), Pascal Bonitzer, Louise Bourgoin, Louis-Do de Lencquesaing, Marc Dugain, Marie Gillain, Julien Hirsch, Sophie Fillières and Marthe Keller
- 2016 : Frédéric Mitterrand (president), Françoise Arnoul, Éric Elmosnino, Sara Forestier, Ana Girardot, Douglas Kennedy, Radu Mihăileanu, Emmanuel Mouret and Marjane Satrapi
- 2017: Michel Hazanavicius (president), Benjamin Biolay, Emmanuelle Devos, Clotilde Hesme, Eric Lartigau, Charlotte Le Bon, Michel Leclerc, Yasmina Reza, Axelle Ropert and Alice Winocour
- 2018 : Sandrine Kiberlain (president), Sabine Azéma, Alex Beaupain, Leïla Bekhti, Stéphane Brizé, Sara Giraudeau, Xavier Legrand, Pierre Salvadori, Leïla Slimani
- 2019 : Catherine Deneuve (president), Antonin Baudry, Claire Burger, Jean-Pierre Duret, Valeria Golino, Vicky Krieps, Gaël Morel, Orelsan, Nicolas Saada, Gaspard Ulliel
- 2020 : Vanessa Paradis (president), Yann Gonzalez, Zita Hanrot, Delphine Horvilleur, Vincent Lacoste, Mounia Meddour, Sylvie Pialat, Brunot Podalydès, Oxmo Puccino
- 2021 : Charlotte Gainsbourg (president), Bertrand Bonello, Delphine de Vigan, Denis Podalydès, Fatou N'Diaye, Garance Marillier, Mikhaël Hers, SebastiAn
- 2025: Golshifteh Farahani (president), Thomas Cailley, Eye Haïdara, Katell Quillévéré, Philippine Leroy-Beaulieu, Vincent Macaigne, Benjamin Millepied and Emilie Tronche.

=== The Revelation Jury ===
- 2006: Christophe Honoré (president), Lou Doillon, Audrey Marnay, Olivier Py, Émilie Simon and Gilles Taurand
- 2007: Gaël Morel (president), Clotilde Hesme, Olivia Magnani, Mélanie Thierry and Florian Zeller
- 2008: Zoe Cassavetes (president), Diastème, Léa Drucker, Jalil Lespert and Ara Starck
- 2009: Maïwenn (president), Romane Bohringer, Nicolas Fargues, Aïssa Maïga, Louise Monot and Raphaël
- 2010: Manuel Pradal (president), Jonathan Lambert, Emma Luchini, Roxane Mesquida and Sébastien Thiéry
- 2011: Samuel Benchetrit (president), Leila Hatami, Sabrina Ouazani, Elisa Sednaoui and Benjamin Siksou
- 2012: Frédéric Beigbeder (president), Àstrid Bergès-Frisbey, Mélanie Bernier, Ana Girardot and Félix Moati
- 2013: Valérie Donzelli (president), Laurence Arné, Vincent Lacoste, Géraldine Maillet and Woodkid
- 2014: Audrey Dana (president), Anne Berest, Lola Bessis, Christine and the Queens, Freddie Highmore and Clémence Poésy
- 2015: Zabou Breitman (president), Alice Isaaz, Géraldine Nakache, Stanley Weber and Rachelle Lefevre
- 2016: Audrey Pulvar (president), Cédric Anger, Jérôme Bonnell, Kheiron, Diane Rouxel and Christa Théret
- 2017: Emmanuelle Bercot (president), Abd al Malik, Anaïs Demoustier, Pio Marmaï, Pierre Rochefort and Leonor Varela

== See also ==
- Deauville Asian Film Festival
