= Matteo Falcone =

- Directed by: Tofiq Tağızadə
- Screenplay by: N. German, Tofig Taghizade
- Starring: Nodar Şaşıqoğlu; Tamilla Aghamirova; Jeyhun Mirzayev
- Cinematography: Rasim Ojagov
- Music by: Gara Garayev
- Release date: 1960
- Running time: 19 minutes
- Country: Soviet Union
- Languages: Azerbaijani, Russian

Matteo Falcone (Azerbaijani: Matteo Falkone) is a Soviet-Azerbaijani short drama film based on Prosper Mérimée's like-named story from 1829.

== Plot ==
Matteo Falcone is a successful Corsican, who lives with his wife Giuseppa and 10-year-old son Fortunato. One day he leaves home with Giuseppa, leaving Fortunato alone. Suddenly, a wounded bandit chased by soldiers arrives and introduces himself as Gianetto Sanpiero. He expects asylum in Matteo Falcone's house. Fortunato at first declines to hide Gianetto, but when the bandit offers a piece of silver, the boy conceals him beneath the hay.

Soldiers led by sergeant Gamba, arrive and want to know whether Fortunato has seen a man on the trail. Fortunato evades Gamba's questions, and the sergeant suspects that the boy is in complicity with Gianetto. He threatens to beat Fortunato, but the boy only replies that he is Matteo Falcone's son, and the sergeant understands that he dares not harm Fortunato for fear of angering the father. The soldiers search the property but find nothing.

Finally, Gamba attempts to bribe Fortunato with a shiny new watch. As Gamba speaks he brings the watch closer and closer until it is almost touching Fortunato's pale cheek. The child's face clearly shows the struggle between cupidity and the claims of hospitality that is raging within him. The temptation is too great. Fortunato accepts the bribe and silently nods in the direction of the haystack. The soldiers discover Gianetto, who curses the boy. Fortunato throws the silver back at Gianetto. On their way back Matteo and Giuseppa encounter Gamba, who tells him everything. Realizing what has happened, Matteo hears the captured Gianetto Sanpiero's words "Betrayer's father".

At home, Matteo sees Fortunato play with the new watch and says there has never been a betrayer in his family. After these words he takes his boy into the high country. As Matteo and Fortunato climb into the mountains, Giuseppa prays inside the house to an icon of the Virgin Mary. In a ravine, Matteo commands Fortunato to kneel and say his prayers. When he finishes praying, Fortunato begs for mercy, but Matteo gives none. He raises his rifle and shoots.

== Cast ==
- Nodar Şaşıqoğlu as Matteo Falcone
- Tamilla Ağamirova as Giuseppa
- Jeyhun Mirzayev as Fortunato
- Anatoli Falkoviç as Gamba
- Tofiq Tağızadə as Gianetto Sanpiero
