= Pereira prétend =

2016 comic book by Pierre-Henry Gomont

- Date: 7 September 2016
- Page count: 160 pages
- Publisher: Éditions Sarbacane

Creative team
- Writer: Pierre-Henry Gomont, after Antonio Tabucchi
- Artists: Pierre-Henry Gomont

Original publication
- Language: French
- ISBN: 9782848659145

Pereira prétend (lit. 'Pereira maintains') is a 2016 French comic book by Pierre-Henry Gomont. Set in Lisbon in 1938, it is about the meeting between a conservative cultural journalist and a freelance journalist who favours left-wing authors. The book is based on the 1994 novel Pereira Maintains by Antonio Tabucchi.

The comic book was published by Éditions Sarbacane on 7 September 2016. RTL selected it as the comic book of the month in September 2016 and went on to give it its Grand Prix for comic book of the year. It received the 2017 Prix Château de Cheverny for historical comics.
