= Civilizations (novel) =

2019 French novel by Laurent Binet

- Author: Laurent Binet
- Translator: Sam Taylor
- Language: French
- Genre: Alternate history, Historical fiction
- Publisher: Grasset & Fasquelle
- Publication date: 2019
- Publication place: France
- Media type: Print
- Pages: 320
- ISBN: 978-2-246-81309-5

Civilizations is a 2019 novel by French writer Laurent Binet. It presents an alternate history in which the Americas are never colonised by Europeans, and the Inca emperor Atahualpa invades Europe.

The novel won the 2019 Grand Prix du roman de l'Académie française, and the English translation by Sam Taylor received the Sidewise Award for Alternate History in 2021.

== Plot summary ==
The narrative is divided into four parts, combining first-person accounts, letters, in-universe historical writing, and poetry.

=== Part One: The Saga of Freydis Eiriksdottir ===
Around the year 1000, Freydís Eiríksdóttir sails from Greenland to Vinland, the settlement previously established by her brother, Leif Erikson. Her crew explores the Americas and encounters local populations, whom they refer to as "skrælings". The Greenlanders share their knowledge of iron extraction from peat and introduce horses to the region. Although they form alliances, many Indigenous Americans die from diseases brought by the Europeans, to which they have no immunity. Over time, however, the population develops resistance.

=== Part Two: The Journal of Christopher Columbus (fragments) ===
In 1492, Christopher Columbus and his expedition arrive in Cuba. The Taíno people, possessing resistance to European diseases and access to iron weaponry, successfully repel colonisation attempts. Most of the Spanish crew perish in battle or from illness, leaving only Columbus alive. The Niña and Pinta are wrecked on the shore.

Captured by the Taíno on Hispaniola, Columbus spends his final days conversing in Spanish with Princess Higuénamota, who learns the language quickly. He dies on the island, having failed in his mission.

=== Part Three: The Chronicles of Atahualpa ===
In 1530, within the Inca Empire, Emperor Huascar declares war on his half-brother Atahualpa, who flees with his court to Cuba. There, he meets the now-adult Higuénamota, from whom he learns about the European invaders. Inspired by her stories, Atahualpa decides to travel east to establish what becomes the Fifth Quarter of the Inca Empire.

Using repaired Spanish ships, the Incas and Higuénamota reach Lisbon on the day of the 1531 Lisbon earthquake, and then continue to Spain. They arrive in Toledo during the Inquisition, where the Incas, learning about Christianity, recognise conversos, Moors, and Protestants as potential allies against the Catholic hierarchy.

Atahualpa ambushes, imprisons, and kills Charles V, and arranges the assassination of Philip, after which he is crowned king of Spain, Naples, and Sicily. His rule ushers in an era of prosperity and religious tolerance. He forms alliances with various European and North African kingdoms, repeals the Alhambra Decree, and issues the Seville Edict, which grants all citizens freedom of religion provided they observe the feasts of Viracocha. Atahualpa also begins importing corn, tomatoes, and tobacco from Peru via Cuba.

Atahualpa eventually acquires the titles of prince of the Belgians, sovereign of the Netherlands, lord of the Berbers, and Emperor of the Fifth Quarter. The Incas prevent Charles's brother, Ferdinand, from being elected Holy Roman Emperor by exploiting his unpopularity among Protestants and encouraging him to wage war against Selim II. Atahualpa himself becomes Holy Roman Emperor.

When Inca ships cease arriving, Atahualpa learns that the Mexica have launched a campaign in Cuba. The Mexican army, led by Cuauhtémoc, invades France and places it under Mexican protection. After converting to Christianity, Cuauhtémoc forms alliances with England and Portugal, leading Atahualpa to sign a peace treaty between the Inca and Mexican empires.

Amid unrest in Italy, where Christian city-states resist the spread of the Inca religion, Atahualpa is assassinated in Florence by Lorenzo, a former ally. He is buried in the Alhambra beside Charles V.

=== Part Four: The Adventures of Cervantes ===
Years later, Atahualpa's son Charles Chapac succeeds him as Holy Roman Emperor. In Spain, Miguel de Cervantes is recruited by El Greco to serve in the army of Archduke Maximilian of Austria.

A naval battle at Lepanto takes place between the Hispano-Inca forces and the allied Ottoman and Austrian fleets. The Hispano-Incas achieve victory, but El Greco and Cervantes are captured and enslaved. They eventually escape and take refuge at the home of Montaigne in France.

El Greco debates fiercely with Montaigne over preserving the Christian identity of Europe. Ultimately, El Greco and Cervantes are captured by Franco-Mexican guards and sent to Cuba, where the Inca and Mexican empires seek painters and writers. The two men arrive in the Caribbean, optimistic about their prospects there.

== Background ==
Binet was inspired to write the novel after a trip to Peru, where he learned that the last Inca emperor, Atahualpa, had been captured by the conquistador Francisco Pizarro with a force of fewer than 200 soldiers.

Jared Diamond's Guns, Germs, and Steel also served as a source of inspiration, particularly a "specific sentence" imagining Atahualpa travelling to Spain, which Binet said "gave [him] the idea for the whole book." Diamond's broader thesis—that Indigenous Americans were defeated by Europeans largely because they lacked horses, antibodies, and iron—was another key influence.

The book's English translation by Sam Taylor was published in the United Kingdom by Harvill Secker, an imprint of Vintage Books.

== Awards and honours ==
- 2019 – Grand Prix du roman de l'Académie française
- 2021 – Sidewise Award for Alternate History (Long Form)
