= Pierre-Henry Gomont =

French comics creator

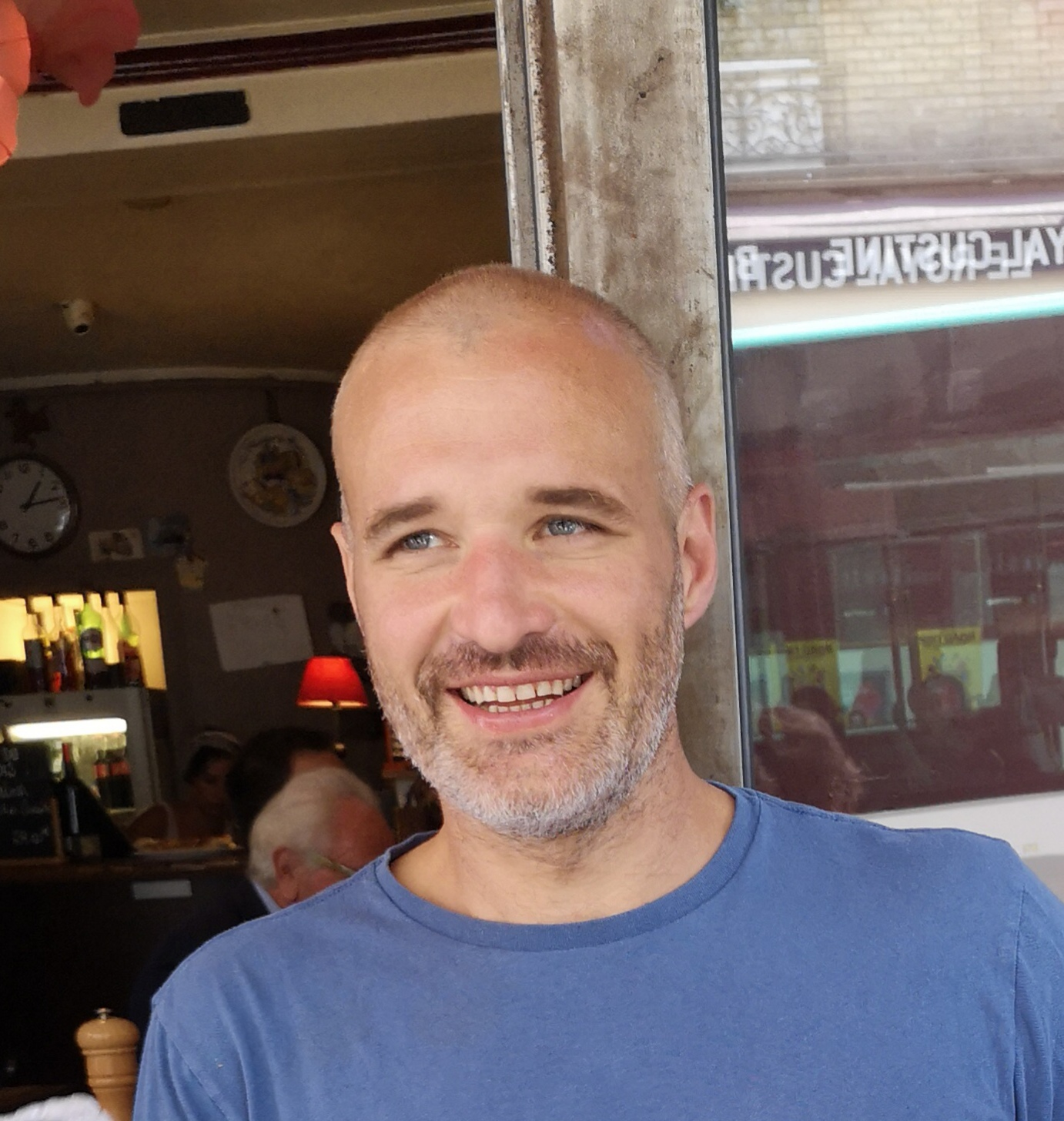
Gomont in 2018

Pierre-Henry Gomont (born in 1978) is a French comics creator and illustrator. His works include the comics Pereira prétend (2016), Malaterre (2018) and Soviet Land (2022–2024).

== Early life ==
Gomont was born in January 1978. He studied at business school and prepared a doctoral thesis in sociology, though he did not defend it. As an artist, he is self-taught. He has cited Gipi's Notes for a War Story, Art Spiegelman, Daniel Clowes, Mike Mignola, and Charles Burns among his influences.

== Career ==
Gomont worked in several fields, including sociology, before becoming a comics creator. His work includes original albums, collaborations with writers, and adaptations of literary works.

Gomont debuted as a comics creator in the 2010 anthology 13m28. He published his first comic album, Kirkenes, with Jonathan Châtel in 2011. The same year, he published Catalyse. In 2014, he illustrated the crime comic Rouge Karma, written by Eddy Simon.

He received wider attention with Pereira prétend, his adaptation of Antonio Tabucchi's novel Pereira Maintains, which received the Grand prix RTL de la bande dessinée in 2016. He received the same award in 2018 for Malaterre. His later work includes the historical album La Fuite du cerveau and the three-volume Slava series, set in Russia in the 1990s. For Pereira prétend, Gomont won the 2017 Prix Château de Cheverny de la bande dessinée historique at the Festival Les Rendez-vous de l'histoire in Blois.

In 2018, Gomont published Malaterre, which was inspired by his own youth and took eight years to complete.

In 2020, he published La Fuite du cerveau, inspired by the theft of Albert Einstein's brain by pathologist Thomas Stoltz Harvey.

In 2026, he illustrated Nicolas Mathieu's daily Eurosport column Sur la ligne during the French Open.

== French language bibliography ==
In order of publication

- Châtel, Jonathan, and Pierre-Henry Gomont. Kirkenes. Les Enfants rouges, 2011. ISBN 9782354190446.
- Gomont, Pierre-Henry. Catalyse. Manolosanctis, 2011. ISBN 9782359760248.
- Borg, Éric, and Pierre-Henry Gomont. Crématorium. KSTR, 2012. ISBN 9782203047020.
- Simon, Eddy, and Pierre-Henry Gomont. Rouge Karma. Éditions Sarbacane, 2014. ISBN 9782848656885.
- Gomont, Pierre-Henry. Les Nuits de Saturne. Adapted from *Carnage, constellation* by Marcus Malte, Sarbacane, 2015. ISBN 9782848658247.
- Gomont, Pierre-Henry. Pereira prétend. Adapted from Pereira Maintains by Antonio Tabucchi, Sarbacane, 2016. ISBN 9782848659145.
- Gomont, Pierre-Henry. Malaterre. Éditions Dargaud, 2018. ISBN 9782505071853.
- Gomont, Pierre-Henry. La Fuite du cerveau. Dargaud, 2020. ISBN 9782505083603.
- Mathieu, Nicolas and Pierre-Henry Gomont. La Grande École. Actes Sud Junior, 2020. ISBN 9782330141936
- Mathieu, Nicolas and Pierre-Henry Gomont. Le Secret des Parents, Actes Sud Junior, 2021. ISBN 9782330155216
- Gomont, Pierre-Henry. *Slava, Tome 1: Après la chute. Dargaud, 2022. ISBN 9782505115250.
- Gomont, Pierre-Henry. Slava, Tome 2: Les Nouveaux Russes. Dargaud, 2023. ISBN 9782505119821.
- Gomont, Pierre-Henry. Slava, Tome 3: Un enfer pour un autre. Dargaud, 2024. ISBN 9782505126324.

=== Comics and graphic novels ===
| Year | Title | Role | Publisher | Notes |
|---|---|---|---|---|
| 2011 | Kirkenes | Artist; written by Jonathan Châtel | Les Enfants rouges | First full album |
| 2011 | Catalyse | Writer and artist | Manolosanctis | |
| 2012 | Crématorium | Artist; written by Éric Borg | KSTЯ (defunct Casterman imprint) | |
| 2014 | Rouge Karma | Artist; written by Eddy Simon | Éditions Sarbacane | Winner, 2015 Prix SNCF du polar, comics category |
| 2015 | Les Nuits de Saturne | Writer and artist | Sarbacane | Adapted from the novel by Marcus Malte |
| 2016 | Pereira prétend | Writer and artist | Sarbacane | Adapted from Antonio Tabucchi's novel, won 2016 Grand prix RTL de la bande dessinée |
| 2018 | Malaterre | Writer and artist | Éditions Dargaud | Winner, 2018 Grand prix RTL de la bande dessinée |
| 2019 | La Fuite du cerveau | Writer and artist | Dargaud | English translation published as The Brain Drain |
| 2022–2024 | Slava | Writer and artist | Dargaud | Trilogy: Après la chute, Les Nouveaux Russes, and Un enfer pour un autre; published in English in the United States as Soviet Land |

=== Children's books ===
| Year | Title | Author | Publisher | Role |
|---|---|---|---|---|
| 2020 | La Grande École | Nicolas Mathieu | Actes Sud Junior | Illustrator |
| 2021 | Le Secret des Parents | Nicolas Mathieu | Actes Sud Junior | Illustrator |

== Awards and recognition ==
| Year | Award | Work | Result |
|---|---|---|---|
| 2015 | Prix SNCF du polar, bande dessinée category | Rouge Karma | Won |
| 2016 | Grand prix RTL de la bande dessinée | Pereira prétend | Won |
| 2017 | Prix Château de Cheverny de la bande dessinée historique | Pereira prétend | Won |
| 2017 | Grand prix de la critique ACBD | Pereira prétend | Finalist |
| 2018 | Grand prix RTL de la bande dessinée | Malaterre | Won |
| 2019 | Prix de la BD Fnac France Inter | Malaterre | Finalist |

| Year | Work | Award or selection | Status |
|---|---|---|---|
| 2015 | Les Nuits de Saturne | Prix BD Ellipses | Selected |
| 2016 | Les Nuits de Saturne | Prix Interpolart Reims | Selected |
| 2017 | Les Nuits de Saturne | Prix Mor Vran du Goéland Masqué | Selected |
