= HHhH =

French novel by Laurent Binet

- English language hardcover edition
- Author: Laurent Binet
- Translator: Sam Taylor
- Language: French
- Genre: Historical fiction
- Publisher: Grasset & Fasquelle
- Publication date: 2010
- Publication place: France
- English publication date: 2012
- Media type: Print
- Pages: 440
- ISBN: 978-2-246-76001-6

HHhH is the debut novel of French author Laurent Binet, published in 2010 by Grasset & Fasquelle. The book is a metafictional novel depicting Operation Anthropoid, the assassination of Nazi leader Reinhard Heydrich in Prague during World War II, along with the writing of the novel. The novel was awarded the 2010 Prix Goncourt du Premier Roman.

== Plot ==
The novel follows the history of the operation and the lives of its protagonists—Reinhard Heydrich and his assassins Jozef Gabčík and Jan Kubiš. It is interlaced with the author's account of the process of researching and writing the book, his commentary about other literary and media treatments of the subject, and reflections about the extent to which the behavior of real people may of necessity be fictionalised in a historical novel.

The novel's editor requested the cut of about twenty pages criticizing Jonathan Littell's Les Bienveillantes, another novel about the SS in World War II that was awarded the Prix Goncourt in 2006. The Millions published the "missing pages" in 2012.

== Title ==
The title is an initialism for Himmlers Hirn heißt Heydrich ("Himmler's brain is called Heydrich"), a quip about Heydrich in SS circles. The title was suggested by Binet's publisher, Grasset, instead of the "too sci-fi" working title Opération Anthropoïde.

== Translations ==
HHhH was written in French and has been translated into more than twenty languages. The English translation by Sam Taylor was published in the US by Farrar, Straus and Giroux on 24 April 2012 and in the UK by Harvill Secker on 3 May 2012.

== Film adaptation ==
Cédric Jimenez directed an English-language film adaptation of the novel, released in the United States as The Man with the Iron Heart. It starred Jason Clarke, Rosamund Pike, Mia Wasikowska, Jack O'Connell and Jack Reynor.

Dutch public broadcaster VPRO produced a documentary television series adaption in 2017.

== Awards and honours ==
- 2010 Prix Goncourt du Premier Roman
- 2011 Europese Literatuurprijs, shortlist
- 2012 National Book Critics Circle Award, finalist
- 2012 New York Times Notable Book of the Year
