= Pereira Maintains =

1994 novel by Antonio Tabucchi

- First edition
- Author: Antonio Tabucchi
- Original title: Sostiene Pereira
- Translator: Patrick Creagh
- Language: Italian
- Publisher: Feltrinelli
- Publication date: 1994
- Publication place: Italy
- English publication date: 1996
- Pages: 207
- ISBN: 88-07-01461-0

Pereira Maintains (Italian: Sostiene Pereira) is a 1994 novel by the Italian writer Antonio Tabucchi. It is also known as Pereira Declares and Declares Pereira. Its story follows Pereira, a journalist for the culture column of a small Lisbon newspaper, as he struggles with his conscience and the restrictions of the dictatorial regime of Antonio Salazar. Antonio Tabucchi won the Premio Campiello, Viareggio Prize and Premio Scanno in 1994 for the novel. It was adapted into a film, also called Sostiene Pereira, in 1996. It was the basis for the French comic book Pereira prétend, made by Pierre-Henry Gomont and published in 2016.

== Plot ==
The novel is set in Portugal in the summer of 1938, during Salazar's dictatorship. Pereira, an old journalist on a Portuguese newspaper - the Lisboa - who loves literature and practically gives his life to it. When he reads an essay written by a young man about death, he calls the young man, whose name is Monteiro Rossi, to ask him to write "advance obituaries" about great writers who could die at any moment. Not having ever been much concerned with politics, Pereira's world is turned upside down when he begins to get to know the distracted and leftist youth. The articles he receives from Monteiro Rossi (and pays him for) have a definite leftist slant and are completely unpublishable, but something continues to attract Pereira to him, perhaps the fact that his wife died before he could have children of his own. His visit to a clinic to help his ailing heart puts him in contact with a doctor, with whom he becomes close friends and discusses the doubts he is beginning to have about his isolated and apolitical life. In the end, fascist police visit Pereira and beat Monteiro Rossi to death. With the help of a phone call from his doctor friend, Pereira manages to slip an article about the murder and condemning the regime into the newspaper he works for, then flees the country using a fake passport.

== People and works mentioned ==
It adds context to know the writers, literature and political references that comprise the world of this novel. In order of appearance, 1995 New Directions edition, translated by Patrick Creagh.

- Luigi Pirandello (1867-1936).
- Ludwig Feuerbach (1804-1872)
- Federico García Lorca. La casa de Bernarda Alba (1936). [He was executed, shot by Falange militia on August 19, 1936], (1898-1936).
- Georges Bernanos. Journal d’un curé de campagne; Grand Prix du Roman (1936). (1888–1948).
- François Mauriac “for the deep spiritual insight and the artistic intensity with which he has in his novels penetrated the drama of human life.” (1885 – 1970).
- Fernando Pessoa (1888-1935).
- Guy de Maupassant. Bel Ami. (1885). Le Horla. (1887). (1850-1893).
- T.E. Lawrence. (1888-1935).
- Thomas Mann. (1875-1955.)
- Rainer Maria Rilke (1875-1926).
- Honoré de Balzac. Honorine (1843). (1799-1850).
- Friedrich Wilhelm Nietzsche. (1844-1900).
- Giambattista Vico. (1668-1774).
- Georg Wilhelm Friedrich Hegel. (1770-1831).
- Karl Marx, 1818–1883.
- Alphonse Daudet. Le petit Chose (1868). Contes du lundi (1873).La Dernière Classe. L'Arlésienne (1872).(1840-1897).
- Aquilino Gomes Ribeiro.[He was involved in the opposition to António de Oliveira Salazar and the Estado Novo, whose government tried to censor or ban several of his books.] (1885-1963).
- Bernardo Marques. (1898-1962).
- Théodule Ribot. (1839-1916).
- Pierre Janet.(1859-1947).
- Jacques Maritain. 1882–1973.
- Vladimir Mayakovsky. (1893-1930.)
- Sergei Mikhailovich Eisenstein. (1898-1948).

Pereira's rightist editor suggests:

- José Maria de Eça de Queirós. (1845-1900).
- Camilo Castelo Branco. (1825-1890).
- Luís Vaz de Camões. Os Lusíadas (1572). (1524-1580).
- António Ferro. [The Portuguese Department of Propaganda-SPN, later called the Portuguese Information, Culture and Tourism Department - SNI, was created by Antonio Ferro to create strategies for ideological propaganda.
- ‘The Poster of the New State‘ by Theresa Beco de Lobo

== Reception ==
Lawrence Venuti of The New York Times pointed out that the book became a success in Italy as a symbol of resistance against Silvio Berlusconi's government. Michael Arditti reviewed the book for The Daily Telegraph in 2010, and wrote: "Pereira Maintains is a concise, intense and original novel. ... Tabucchi now takes his place alongside Irène Némirovsky, Sándor Márai and Stefan Zweig as one of the great Continental rediscoveries for English-speaking readers of recent years."
