= Mateo Falcone =

1829 French short story

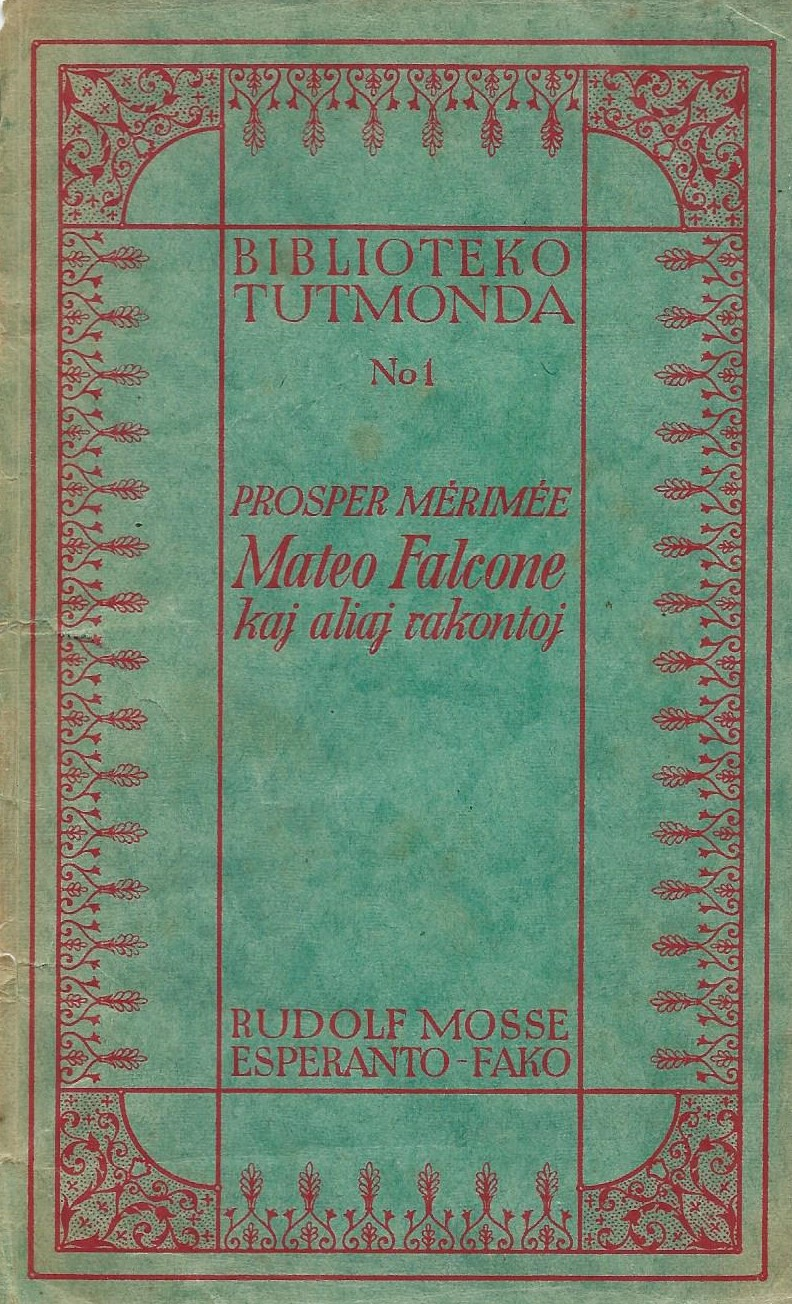
Esperanto translation

Mateo Falcone is an 1829 short story by Prosper Mérimée. It first appeared in the May issue of Revue de Paris. Its tightly focused narrative was well received and it has been called the original French short story.

== Plot ==
Mateo Falcone is a respected landlord and marksman who lives in a rugged part of Corsica frequented by fugitives. One day, he leaves his 10-year-old son Fortunato in charge of the house while inspecting a sheep flock. In his absence, a wanted criminal named Gianetto happens by and, knowing Mateo's reputation, asks to hide in the house. Fortunato hesitates but gives in after Gianetto offers him a silver coin.

Soon, a group of soldiers arrive led by Fortunato's distant cousin Tiodoro. Tiodoro questions him about Gianetto and, unsatisfied by the answers, orders the home searched. After finding no one, he offers his silver watch in exchange for Gianetto. Unable to resist, Fortunato gives away the criminal's hiding place.

Mateo and his wife return while the soldiers are busy arresting Gianetto. While Tiodoro enthusiastically tells Mateo how the man was captured, Gianetto denounces his house as that of a traitor. Furious, Mateo waits for the soldiers to leave, then orders Fortunato to follow him into a nearby ravine. There he bids Fortunato to say his prayers and then shoots him dead. Returning to the house, Mateo tells his wife that justice has been done and he will take in their son-in-law.

== Adaptations ==
César Cui wrote the one-act opera Mateo Falcone in 1907.

Radio show “Weird Circle” had an adaption in 1943.

The story was adapted into a short Soviet film in 1960.

Katsuhiro Otomo adapted Mateo Falcone into his 1973 debut manga, A Gun Report.

In 2009, the short story was adapted into a 65-minute film directed by Éric Vuillard.

== See also ==
- Omertà
