= Willy 1er =

- Theatrical release poster
- Directed by: Ludovic Boukherma; Zoran Boukherma; Marielle Gautier; Hugo P. Thomas
- Written by: Ludovic Boukherma; Zoran Boukherma; Marielle Gautier; Hugo P. Thomas
- Produced by: Pierre-Louis Garnon; Frédéric Jouve
- Starring: Daniel Vannet; Noémie Lvovsky; Romain Léger
- Cinematography: Thomas Rames
- Edited by: Xavier Sirven; Héloïse Pelloquet
- Music by: Hugo P. Thomas; Sofiane Kadi
- Production companies: Les Films Velvet; Baxter Films
- Distributed by: UFO Distribution
- Release dates: 16 May 2016 (Cannes); 19 October 2016 (France)
- Running time: 82 minutes
- Country: France
- Language: French
- Budget: $500,000
- Box office: $77.000

Willy 1er is a 2016 French comedy-drama film written and directed by Ludovic Boukherma, Zoran Boukherma, Marielle Gautier and Hugo P. Thomas. The film centres on a 50-year-old man who, after the death of his twin brother, leaves his parents' house for the first time to settle in a nearby village. The film was awarded the Prix d'Ornano-Valenti for outstanding first film at the 2016 Deauville American Film Festival.

== Cast ==
- Daniel Vannet as Willy / Michel
- Noémie Lvovsky as Catherine
- Romain Léger as Willy II
- Robert Follet as Willy's father
- Geneviève Plet as Willy's mother
- Eric Jacquet as José
- Alexandre Jacques as Brice
- Léa Viller as Chloé
- Catherine Lefrançois as Sandrine
