= The Order of the Day =

2017 French novel by Éric Vuillard, Goncourt Prize winner

- First edition (French)
- Author: Éric Vuillard
- Original title: L'Ordre du jour
- Translator: Mark Polizzotti
- Language: French
- Genre: récit (narrative)
- Publisher: Actes Sud
- Publication date: 2017
- Publication place: France
- English publication date: 2018
- ISBN: 9781590519707

The Order of the Day (French: L'Ordre du jour) is a novel by the French writer Éric Vuillard. In French it is described as a récit, while The Guardian described it as an historical essay with literary flourishes.

The book received the Prix Goncourt.

== Content ==
The action of the book takes place during the time between the rise to power of the German Nazi party (chapter: A secret meeting), and the Anschluss (chapter: Interview at the Berghof and The art of indecision).

== See also ==
- 2017 in literature
- Contemporary French literature
