= Laurent Binet =

French writer and university lecturer

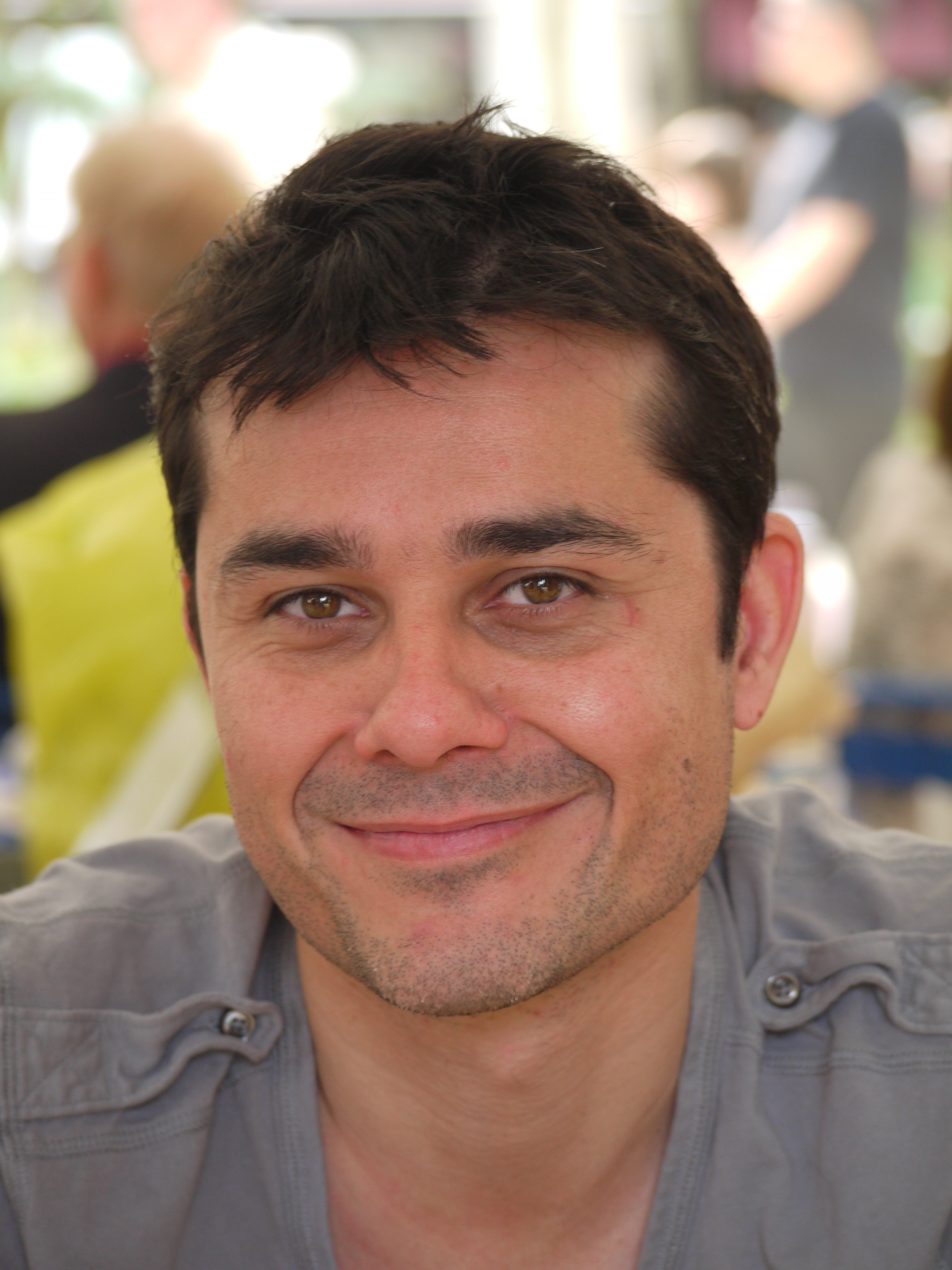
- Born: 19 July 1972 (age 54); Paris, France
- Education: University of Paris
- Occupations: Writer, university lecturer

Laurent Binet (born 19 July 1972) is a French writer and university lecturer. His work focuses on the modern political scene in France.

== Biography ==
The son of a historian, Laurent Binet was born in Paris. He graduated from the University of Paris with a degree in Literature. He spent four years singing and playing guitar with a rock band named Stalingrad. He teaches French in a Paris suburb and also at the University of Saint-Denis.

Binet was awarded the 2010 Prix Goncourt du Premier Roman for his first novel, HHhH. The novel recounts the assassination of Nazi leader Reinhard Heydrich in 1942.

In August 2012, Binet published Rien ne se passe comme prévu (Nothing goes as planned), a behind-the-scenes account of the successful presidential campaign of François Hollande, which Binet witnessed while embedded with Hollande's campaign staff. In 2015, he published his second novel, La septième fonction du langage, which was translated in 2017 as The Seventh Function of Language, a detective thriller dealing with a fictionalized account of Roland Barthes's death.

In 2019, he published Civilizations, an alternative history novel about the conquest of Europe by Atahualpa. The novel was awarded the Grand Prix du roman de l'Académie française in 2019 and was published in English by Farrar, Straus and Giroux. The English translation won the Sidewise Award for Alternate History in 2022.

In 2023, he published Perspective(s), a novel set in Renaissance Florence. Its English translation was shortlisted for the Dublin Literary Award in 2026.

== Works ==
=== Novels ===
- HHhH (2010), Grasset, ISBN 978-2-246-76001-6
- The Seventh Function of Language (La Septième Fonction du langage) (2015), Grasset, ISBN 978-2-24677601-7
- Civilizations (2019), Grasset, ISBN 978-2-246-81309-5
- Perspective(s) (2023), Grasset, ISBN 9782246829355

=== Short stories ===
- "Forces et faiblesses de nos muqueuses" (2000), Le Manuscrit, ISBN 978-2-74810014-3

=== Non-fiction ===
- La Vie professionnelle de Laurent B. (2004), Little Big Man, autobiography, ISBN 978-2-915557-52-7
- Rien ne se passe comme prévu (2012), Grasset, politics, ISBN 978-2-24679933-7
- Dictionnaire amoureux du tennis (2020), with Antoine Benneteau, guide, ISBN 978-2-25927-686-3

=== Collective works ===
- Qu'est-ce que la gauche? (2017), Fayard, ISBN 978-2-21370458-6

== Adaptations ==
- The Man with the Iron Heart (2017), film directed by Cédric Jimenez, based on novel HHhH
