= Lac de Pierre-Percée =

Lake in Meurthe-et-Moselle, France

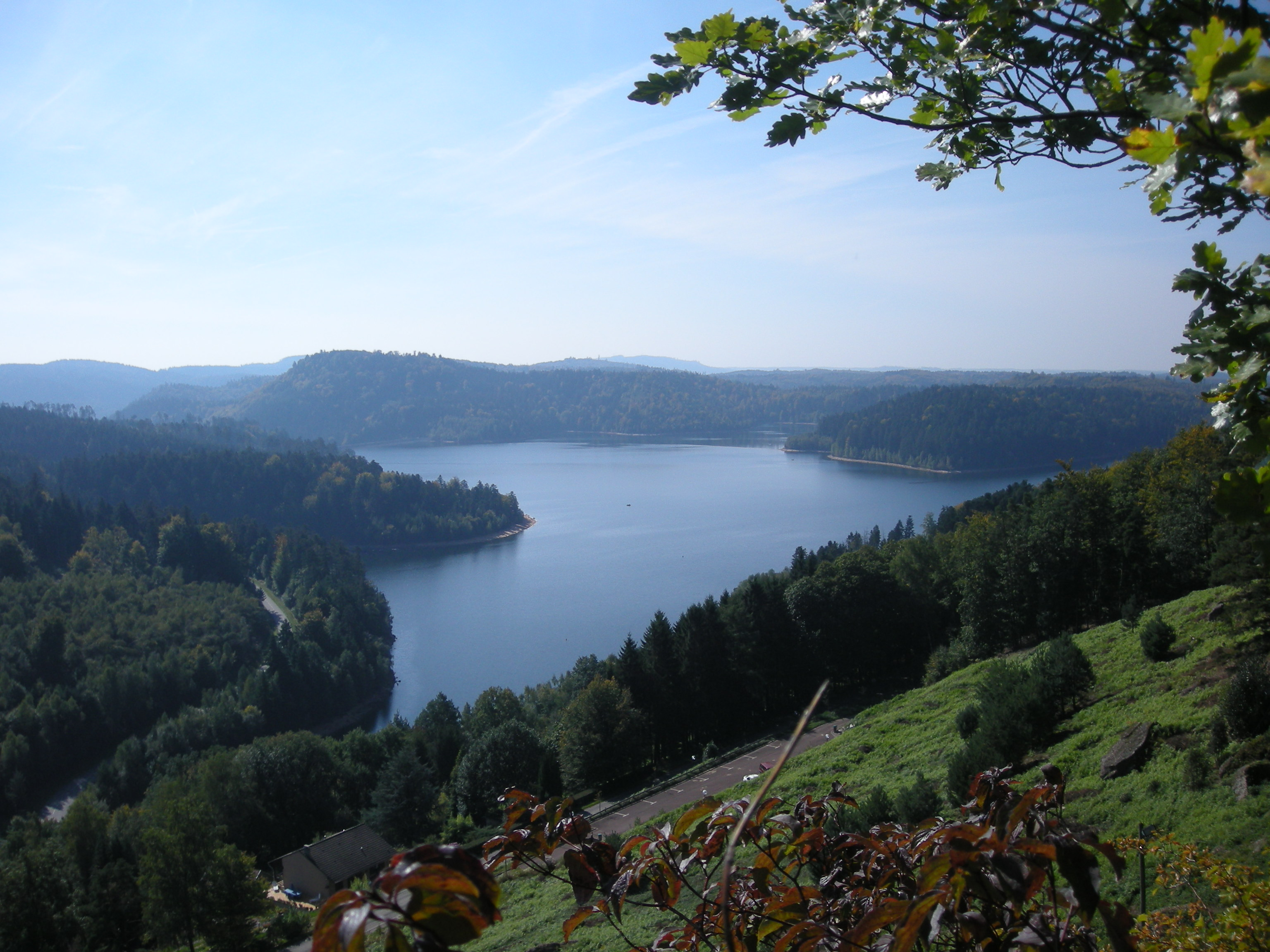

- Location within Grand Est
- Location: Pierre-Percée, Meurthe-et-Moselle
- Coordinates: 48°28′N 6°55′E
- Type: artificial
- Catchment area: 11 km^{2} (4.2 sq mi)
- Basin countries: France
- Surface area: 3.04 km^{2} (1.17 sq mi)
- Max. depth: 78 m (256 ft)
- Water volume: 61.6 hm^{3} (49,900 acre⋅ft)
- Surface elevation: 380 m (1,250 ft)

Lac de Pierre-Percée is a lake in Pierre-Percée, Meurthe-et-Moselle, France. At an elevation of 380 m, its surface area is 3.04 km².
