= Ludovic and Zoran Boukherma =

French filmmaking duo

- Born: 1992 (age 33–34); Marmande, France

Ludovic Boukherma and Zoran Boukherma (born 1992) are a French filmmaking duo of twin brothers.

== Early life and education ==
Ludovic and Zoran Boukherma were born in Marmande in 1992. They studied filmmaking at the L'École de la Cité, a Parisian school founded by Luc Besson.

== Career ==
After directing a series of short films, the Boukherma's first feature film, Willy the 1st, co-directed with Marielle Gautier and Hugo P. Thomas, premiered at the ACID Showcase sidebar of the Cannes Film Festival in 2016. Their second feature film, Teddy, debuted as an official selection at the 2020 Cannes Film Festival. Inspired by the French political climate, the film starred Anthony Bajon as a werewolf.

In 2022, the Boukherma's film The Year of the Shark (L'Année du requin) premiered at the Neuchatel International Fantastic Film Festival. Their 2024 film And Their Children After Them, an adaptation of the Nicolas Mathieu novel of the same name, premiered in the main competition at the 81st Venice International Film Festival.

== Filmography ==
Key
†	Denotes films that have not yet been released

Year	English title	Original title	Notes	Ref.
2016	Willy the 1st	Willy 1^{er}	Co-directed with Marielle Gautier and Hugo P. Thomas	
2020	Teddy		—N/a	
2022	Year of the Shark	L'Année du requin	—N/a	
2024	And Their Children After Them	Leurs enfants après eux	—N/a	
