= Connemara Station =

Cattle station in Queensland, Australia

Coordinates: 25.69763°S 146.8557°E

Location in Queensland

Connemara Station, also often spelled as Connemarra Station, is a pastoral lease that currently operates as a cattle station in Queensland.

The property is situated approximately 95 kilometres west of Stonehenge. The ephemeral Farrar's Creek runs through the property.

The lease was first taken up by pioneer and pastoralist John Costello in the late 1860s. By 1877 Connemara was owned by De Burgh Persee, who was running cattle. In 1881 Connemara sold for £21,000 and was stocked with 3,000 head of cattle.

Acquired in the 1880s by Vincent James Dowling, James Cox and Septimus Stephen, the property was stocked with 25,000 head of cattle and occupied an area of 3,000 square miles (7,770 km^{2}).

In 1933 the homestead was completely destroyed by fire. The manager, S. G. Kerr, lost everything in the fire. At this time Connemarra was owned by Allison and Wigan. When put up for auction in 1937 while stocked with 9,235 head of cattle, the property attracted no bids and was passed in. The trustees of the estate of J. B. Allison sold the station in 1938 to B. K. Reid. At the time it was stocked with 8,500 shorthorn cattle and 100 horses and encompassed an area of 1,906 square miles (4,937 km^{2}).

The North Australian Pastoral Company acquired the property in 1986 and sold it in 2007.

== See also ==
- List of ranches and stations
