= Aux Animaux la Guerre =

French novel

- Author: Nicolas Mathieu
- Translator: Sam Taylor
- Language: French
- Subject: Deindustrialization, social tension, crime, gangsters
- Genre: Literary fiction, Crime fiction, Noir fiction, mystery fiction
- Set in: Vosges
- Publisher: Actes Sud, Hodder & Stoughton
- Publication date: 5 March 2014
- English publication date: 5 August 2021
- Pages: 368
- Awards: Prix Erckmann-Chatrian 2014, Prix Mystère de la critique 2015
- ISBN: 978-1-5293-3159-2
- OCLC: 1259508933

Aux Animaux la Guerre is the first novel of Nicolas Mathieu. Published by Actes Noirs, the noir division of Actes Sud, in 2014, it has won four awards, has been translated into English by Sam Taylor (under the title Of Fangs And Talons) and was adapted for a six-episode French television series.

== Synopsis ==
Velocia, the last remaining automotive subcontractor in a Vosges valley town hit by deindustrialization, closes its factory, to the despair of the workers and the disdain of the trade union. Martel, a trade union representative, is promoted to secretary of the works council. With the factory threatened with closure, Martel crosses paths with Rita, a bereaved and combative labor inspector, and teams up with Bruce, a muscular and drug-addicted colleague, to try and make ends meet. He resorts to crime in a plot that escalates into a kidnapping.

== Awards ==
- Prix Erckmann-Chatrian, 2014
- Prix Transfuge du meilleur espoir Polar, 2014
- Prix Mystère de la critique, 2015
- Prize for noir novel at the Festival du goéland masqué, 2015
- Prix Ginkgo du livre, 2023 (audiobook)

== Critical reception ==
Reviewing the English translation, Laura Wilson of The Guardian (UK) noted the novel's "bleakly uncompromising portrait of working-class life" She also praised Mathieu's style as "powerful and compelling."

== Editions ==
- Aux animaux la guerre, Actes Sud, Collection Actes noirs, 2014. ISBN 978-2-330-03037-7
- Aux animaux la guerre. Collection Babel Noir, Number 147, p.444-448. 6 January 2016. ISBN 978-2-330-05864-7
- Of Fangs and Talons, Hodder & Stoughton, 5 August 2021. English translation by Sam Taylor. ISBN 9781529331592

== Adaptation ==
France 3 bought the audiovisual rights to the novel, then distributed a television series adapted from it and under the same name for one season (six episodes) in November 2018, the same month and year that Mathieu was selected by the Académie Française for the Prix Goncourt. The show was directed by Alain Tasma and written by Tasma and the author in collaboration.

== See also ==
- Actes noir
- Babel noir
