= Nicolas Mathieu (writer) =

French novelist (born 1978)

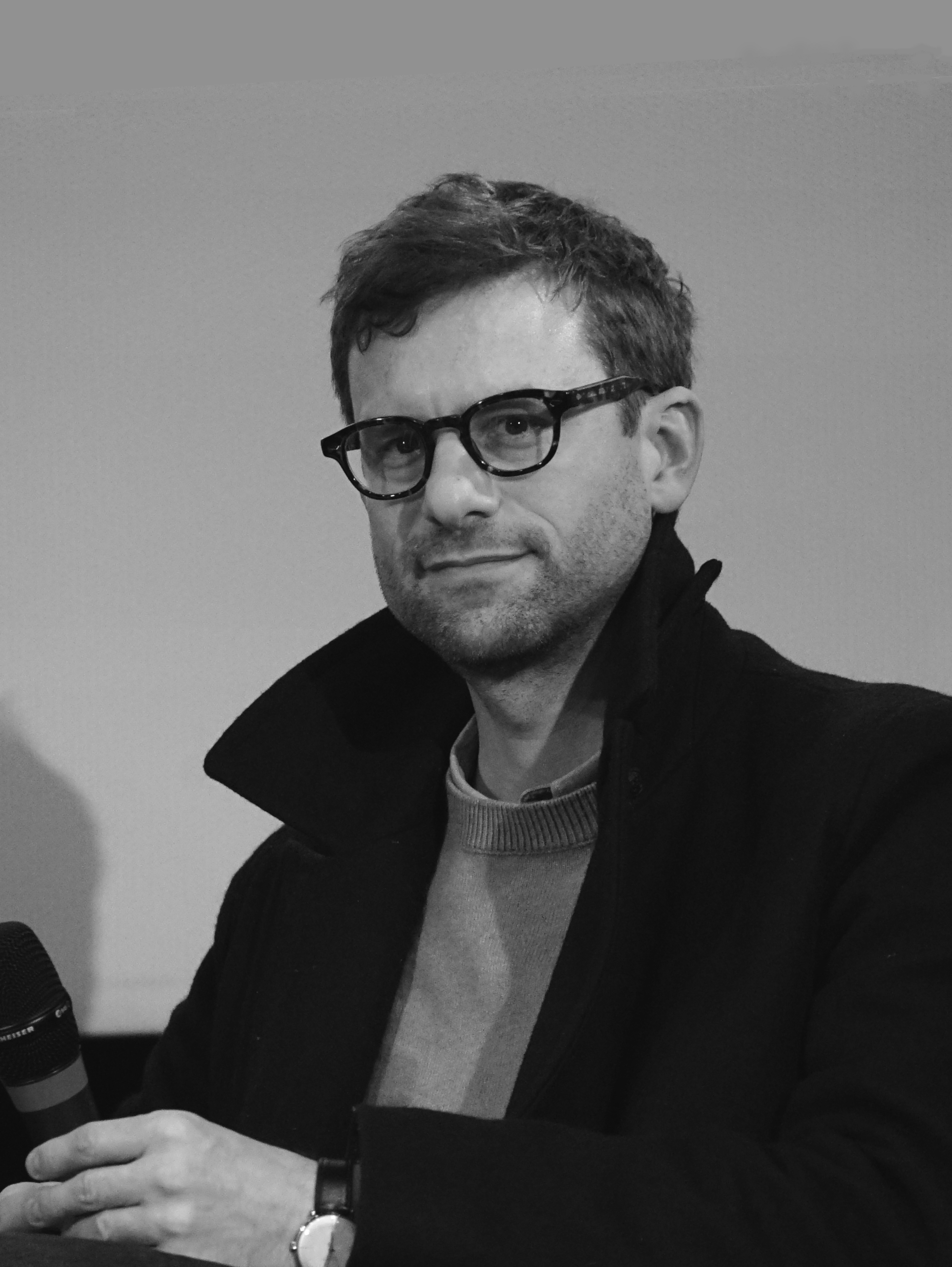
- Mathieu in 2019
- Born: 2 June 1978 (age 48); Épinal, France
- Education: University of Metz (since merged into University of Lorraine)
- Occupation: Novelist
- Writing career
- Years active: 2014-present
- Genres: literary fiction, Noir fiction
- Subjects: deindustrialization, inequality, social issues, human angst
- Notable works: Leurs enfants après eux (And Their Children After Them); Aux animaux la guerre (Of Fangs And Talons); Connemara
- Notable awards: Albertine Prize (2021); Prix Goncourt (2018); Prix Mystère de la critique (2015); Prix Erckmann-Chatrian (2014)

Nicolas Mathieu (French pronunciation: [nikɔla matjø]; born 2 June 1978 in Épinal) is a French novelist who has also written short fiction and children's literature. He was awarded the Prix Goncourt in 2018 for his novel Leurs enfants après eux (in translation: And Their Children After Them), which follows a group of young people growing up in the aftermath of deindustrialization in northeastern France, a theme that recurs throughout his work, notably Connemara and Aux Animaux la Guerre (in translation: Of Fangs and Talons.)

== Biography, education, and early work ==
Mathieu was born on 2 June 1978 to parents who were respectively an electromechanical technician and an accountant. He spent his childhood in a tract housing development in Golbey, a small town in the Vosges region. Educated in a private Catholic school, he knew he wanted to be a writer at the age of 14. At this time in his life he remembers being especially fond of The Picture of Dorian Gray by Oscar Wilde and Nausea by Jean-Paul Sartre.

He has said that his time in school is where he began to understand socioeconomic class distinctions and that this awareness intensified once he discovered the writing of Annie Ernaux.

He earned his undergraduate degree from the Paul Verlaine University in Metz, then studied art history and film theory for a Master's Degree. His thesis focused on Terrence Malick from a philosophical perspective.

He subsequently went to work as a manager in the communications department at City Hall in Paris. He later spoke about this time of life as difficult for him. He experienced a "burn-out" that prompted his return to his native region and to settle in the city of Nancy. "The idea," he said, was to "work less to earn a living," and thereby have more time to write. To earn a living in Nancy, he worked for ATMO Grand-Est (a non-profit environmental agency) as a generalist writer in a communications role.

== Writing career ==
=== Aux animaux la guerre (Of Fangs And Talons) ===
His first novel is Aux animaux la guerre (2014), (Note: Literally, and awkwardly, "To Animals the war," though the English translation of the novel is titled, "Of Fangs and Talons.") a mystery and crime novel, published by Chez Actes Noirs, a division of Éditions Actes Sud. It was adapted to a 6-part France 3 television series in 2018. It was translated by Sam Taylor into English in 2021 as Of Fangs And Talons. The novel covers deindustrialization and moral decay and is said to follow in the literary traditions of writers such as Balzac and Émile Zola. He has said that he thinks the style is more like Gustave Flaubert than Zola. The author himself said, in a discussion about his heavy prose style in this novel, "I owe as much to Proust as to the Sopranos."

The novel won three distinctions: the Prix Erckmann-Chatrian in 2014, the Prix Mystère de la critique, and the Festival du goéland masqué in 2015.

=== Leurs enfants après eux (And Their Children After Them) ===
His second novel, Leurs enfants après eux (2018) is about a group of young people in the 1990s in a fictional rural northeastern French town, set in the valley of Lorraine, over the course of six years. This novel expands and deepens the exposition of the negative consequences of deindustrialization.

It was translated by William Rodarmor for Other Press in the United States as And Their Children After Them on 7 April 2020.

The original novel won France's prestigious Prix Goncourt in 2018. In 2021, the translation earned Mathieu the Albertine Prize, an annual reader's choice award for French writing in translation.

President Emmanuel Macron mentioned the book's title in his New Year's Address for 2018, after the decisive 2017 French presidential election.

=== Connemara ===
Connemara was published by Actes Sud in 2022. It is described as a "complex love story" between Hélène and Christophe, two forty-somethings, who hail from the same town in the Vosges region but reconnect after leading very different lives. Mathieu gave the work its title as a nod to the song "Les Lacs du Connemara" (Note: Literally, "The Lakes of Connemara") by Michel Sardou. Mathieu justified the choice by explaining that while the song is something we all share across the social spectrum, its meaning varies depending on certain distinctions of society and culture. The novel also explores the pressures of a career in management consulting, which is the field in which the leading female character, Hélène, works. Mathieu met with numerous consultants during the preparatory phase of writing the novel. The novel interestingly ancipated, the McKinsey Affair, with its construction of a realistic, highly-charged, ambitious, and corrupt consulting-firm culture around its female protagonist. (Note: L'Affaire McKinsey, or McKinsey Affair, also known as McKinseygate, was a scandal in French politics involving the political campaign of Emmanuel Macron from 2017 to 2022. The French article in Wikipedia (Affaire_McKinsey) gives more detail. For an overview in English, see: McKinsey Company/French presidential corruption scandal)

American literary circles responded to the novel with allusions between the romance of Hélène and Christophe and the larger, national scale of French sociopolitical divides.

=== Rose Royal ===
In 2019, Mathieu published the roman noir-style novella titled Rose Royal. It was translated by Sam Taylor (who had also translated Connemara for publication in the same year) for Other Press in 2022 and titled as, Rose Royal: A Love Story. Mathieu was inspired to write the story by an evening he spent with the renowned French noir writer Marc Villard. The Times Literary Supplement described the novella as Mathieu’s first real foray into noir fiction. Although Mathieu had previously written about crime and used hardboiled elements, Rose Royal differed from his earlier works by centering a female protagonist directly involved in lethal crime. He said that the poster for the John Cassavetes film Gloria (1980) - depicting Gena Rowlands pointing a handgun at the onlooker - gave him the idea for a worn-out but beautiful woman named Rose, "who likes men and who likes a drink or two" and a plot "with a gun in her handbag..." Rose is typical of Mathieu's characters in that she lives in industrial northeastern France post-deindustrialization and belongs to an invisible and marginalized social class. Mathieu characterized Rose as strong and intelligent, and used the story to challenge assumptions about the kinds of women who become victims of crime and abuse.

A review in Publishers Weekly argued that Rose Royal, in spite of the presence of the gun, doesn't quite qualify as noir fiction. The same review did call it "an eccentric little book with depths beyond its page count," but also suggested that the protagonist sometimes "acts in unconvincing ways."

=== Le Ciel Ouvert ===
In 2024, he published Le Ciel Ouvert, a collection of short stories and poetry. The work includes illustrations by Aline Zalco. Mathieu explained in interviews that he had begun writing the ideas that became this collection of prose in Facebook posts in 2008, continuing on Instagram from 2012, and that these writings were messages to "a woman who was not free," and who he admired from a distance and in secret. It was, in effect, an opening of the sky (the English translation of the title being 'the open sky') on something like a private diary. The texts were "cast into a stream," live-posted confessions, it was said. This was remarkable as a story in motion and a daily account of the passage of time. He has said that these outpourings were his attempt to process overwhelming emotions, a struggle to move beyond it, and a "war against the natural course of things." As of 2026, this work of autofiction is available in its original French, in Spanish translation, as El Cielo Abierto., and in German translation as Jede Sekunde.

=== Le Seul Bonheur ===
In April/May 2026, Nicolas Mathieu published Le Seul Bonheur, a children’s book about the trials of fatherhood. In it, he expresses the bewilderment, the love, and the unique happiness that this experience brought him, in other words: a paradoxical happiness born precisely of his sense of powerlessness as a father, his struggle to embrace the role, and the persistent feeling of never quite measuring up. It was within this vulnerability—almost in secret—that he discovered the highest form of happiness.

=== Other works ===
In 2021, he was a resident writer of the Albertine Foundation in Oxford, MS after winning the Albertine Prize for And Their Children After Them. During that writer-residency, he wrote a feature story titled, "One Summer at the Circle" for publication in The Southwest Review. (Note: Mathieu's story, "One Summer at the Circle," is published in The Southwest Review, Spring 2024, Vol.109, No.1.) Mathieu received the Albertine Prize at the French embassy in Manhattan. The translator William Rodarmor and author Rachel Kushner were among those present.

In May 2026, Mathieu began contributing a daily column, "Sur la ligne" for Eurosport France, to run during the 2026 French Open and to be illustrated by Pierre-Henry Gomont. This assignment was strictly for the fortnight of the Roland Garros 2026 event. It was covered daily on the Eurosport France website and Instagram account. (See External links below.)

== Political views and activities ==
Generally, his social and political views are expressed on Instagram.

During the COVID-19 pandemic Mathieu stayed in his house in Nancy and was quoted in The Washington Post for a story about the forgotten communities of France and how their isolation actually worked in their favor during the pandemic. He spoke about how his particular community came together to help each other during the crisis.

In 2023, the periodical Libération posted an article that called him (in French, though translated here) "public enemy number one of the Macron camp."

In 2022, he had expressed supportive remarks about the French politician Fabien Roussel, although he never officially endorsed him.

He supported the 2023 French pension reform strikes. He published an op-ed piece, addressing the government of French President Emmanuel Macron explicitly, titled, "Savez-vous quelle réserve de rage vous venez de libérer ?" (Do you realize what reservoir of rage you have just unleashed?) The piece was published in Mediapart on 18 March 2023.

That same year, when the French Interior Minister Gérald Darmanin ordered the ban of sale to minors of the book Bien Trop Petit by Manu Causse. In response, Mathieu called for his Instagram followers to join him in posting the books they read as teenagers under the hashtag #WhenIWas15. The posts were subsequently compiled for a collection that included a contribution from Mathieu and then was published by Éditions Thierry Magnier. Actes Sud released an audiobook of the collection in 2023, narrated by Mathieu and the fourteen other contributors.

In May 2025, Mathieu joined a group of writers in writing an op-ed piece, denouncing the genocide of the population in Gaza and calling for an immediate ceasefire.

== Personal life ==
In March 2024, an article in Paris Match suggested a romance between Nicolas Mathieu and Charlotte Casiraghi with further speculation appearing in Libération and elsewhere in the French media. It was generally said that the wide disparity of background between Mathieu and Casiraghi, a fellow writer but coincidentally the niece of the Albert II, Prince of Monaco, coupled with the author's tendency to be very vocal especially on Instagram about social class distinctions, generated this high level of interest in their relationship.

The author lives in Nancy. He has one son from a previous relationship, who was born in 2013 and to whom he dedicated his most renowned book, Leurs enfants après eux.

== Awards and honours ==
- 2014 Prix Erckmann-Chatrian winner Aux animaux la guerre
- 2015 Prix Mystère de la critique winner Aux animaux la guerre
- 2015 Festival du goéland masqué prize for novel Aux animaux la guerre
- 2018 Prix Goncourt winner Leurs enfants après eux
- 2018 Feuille d'or de la ville de Nancy for Leurs enfants après eux
- 2021 Albertine Prize winner for And Their Children After Them

== Bibliography of Nicolas Mathieu ==
(In order of publication date)

=== Novels ===
- Aux animaux la guerre. Actes Sud. Actes Noirs. 2014. ISBN 9782330030377
- Leurs enfants après eux. Actes Sud. Actes Noirs. 2018. ISBN 9782330108717.
- Connemara. Actes Sud. Collection Domaine Français. 2022. ISBN 9782330159702.

==== Novellas ====
- "Paris/Colmar". Illustrated by Florent Chavouet. Collection Les Petits Polars du Monde. Le Monde/SNCF. 2015. ISBN 9782361562090.
  - Republished in 2021 as "La retraite du juge Wagner" in the novella Rose Royal.
- "La Fille aux seins nus," a novella printed in Schnaps! no.1, June 2017.
- Portrait d'une femme en jaune dans Gilets jaunes, pour un nouvel horizon social, Au diable vauvert, 2019.
- Rose Royal. Éditions In8. 2019. ISBN 9782362240980.
- Rose Royal et La retraite du juge Wagner. Actes Sud. Collection Babel. 2021. ISBN 9782330149970

=== Other ===
- Poetry: "Jamais je ne t’avais vue plus simple dans," a poem printed in Schnaps! no.4, July 2019.
- Photographic Story: Les vies qu'on mène. Text by Nicolas Mathieu. Photographs by Jérôme Sessini and Tendance Floue. Le Bec en l'air, 2022, 256 p. ISBN 9782367441627.
- Autofiction & poetry: Le Ciel ouvert. Illustrated by Aline Zalko. Actes Sud. 2024. ISBN 9782330185497.
- Anonymous collection with contributions from Mathieu. Un texte sans titre en ouverture de #Wheniwas15, Éditions Thierry Magnier, collection Hors collection, 2023, 176 p. ISBN 9791035206994.
- History: Les sciences sociales face à l’automobile: Histoire, état des lieux et perspectives. An essay contributed by Mathieu. ISBN 9791031808581.

=== Children's books ===
- La Grande École. Illustrated by Pierre-Henry Gomont. Actes Sud Junior. 2020. ISBN 9782330141936
- Le Secret des parents. Illustrated by Pierre-Henry Gomont. Actes Sud Junior. 2021. ISBN 9782330155216
- Papa. Illustrated by Stéphane Kiehl. Actes Sud. 2022. ISBN 9782330162863
- Le Seul Bonheur. Illustrated by Benjamin Chaud. Éditions La Doux. 29 April 2026. ISBN 9782488813020

=== His works in translation ===
- Sus hijos después de ellos. (Spanish edition of And Their Children After Them.) Translated by Amaya García Gallego. Alianza Editorial: 19 September 2019. ISBN 9788491816393.
- Of Fangs and Talons. (English edition of Aux animaux la guerre.) Translated by Sam Taylor. Sceptre. 2021. ISBN 9781529331578
- And Their Children After Them. Translated by William Rodarmor. Other Press. 2020. ISBN 9781892746771
- Wie später ihre Kinder. (German edition of And Their Children After Them.) Translated by André Hansen. Piper Verlag: 1 April 2021. ISBN 9783492315753.
- Rose Royal: A Love Story. Translated by Sam Taylor. Other Press. 2022. ISBN 978-1-63542-195-8.
- Connemara (Spanish edition.) Translated by Amaya García Gallego. Alianza Editorial: 6 October 2022. ISBN 9788413629797.
- Connemara. (English edition.) Translated by Sam Taylor. Other Press. 2024. ISBN 978-1-63542-356-3
- "One Summer at the Circle". Translated by Alex Andriesse. Southwest Review. Vol. 109, no. 1. Spring 2024.
- El cielo abierto. (Spanish edition of Le Ciel Ouvert.) Translated by Manuel Cuesta Aguirre. Editorial Grupo Anaya: 20 March 2025 ISBN 9788410138834.
- Jede Sekunde. (German edition of Le Ciel Ouvert.) Translated by André Hansen and Lena Müller. Berlin: Hanser Verlag, May 2025. ISBN 9783446281752.

== Prefaces by Nicolas Mathieu ==
- Deroudille, Clémentine. Louis de Funès. Éditions Flammarion, 2019. 192 p. ISBN 9782081490963.
- Berlioux, Salomé. Nos campagnes suspendues. Éditions de l'Observatoire, 2020. 206 p. ISBN 9791032915219.
