= Éric Vuillard =

French writer and film director

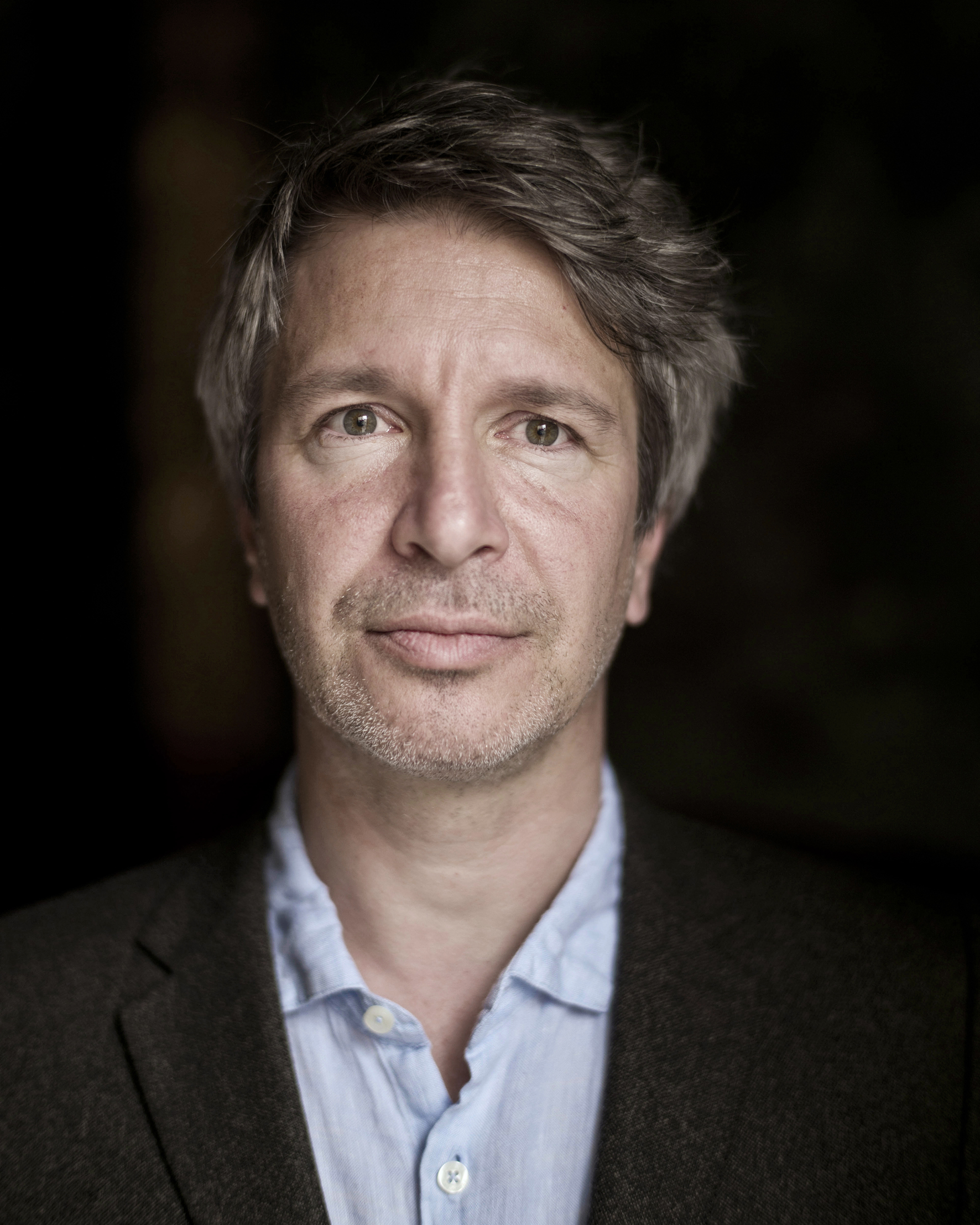
Éric Vuillard in 2016

Éric Vuillard (French: [eʁik vɥijaʁ]; 4 May 1968, Lyon) is a French writer and film director. He has made two films, L'homme qui marche and Mateo Falcone, the latter based on the story Mateo Falcone by Prosper Merimee. He is the author of Conquistadors (2009) which won the Prix de l'inaperçu in 2010. He won the Prix Goncourt in 2017 for L'Ordre du jour.

== Bibliography ==
His literary works include:

- Le Chasseur, Éditions Michalon, 1999
- Bois vert, Éditions Léo Scheer, 2002
- Tohu, Éditions Léo Scheer, 2005
- Conquistadors, Paris, Éditions Léo Scheer, 2009 (Prix Ignatius J. Reilly, 2010)
- La bataille d’Occident (stories) Actes Sud, 2012 ( (Franz-Hessel-Preis 2012, Prix Littéraire Valery Larbaud 2013)
- « Un endroit où aller », 2012 (Prix Franz-Hessel, 2012 ; Prix Valery-Larbaud, 2013; Prix Valery-Larbaud, 2013; finalist for the Prix Femina 2014; Prix Joseph-Kessel 2015)
- Congo, récit, Arles, Actes Sud, 2016 (Franz-Hessel-Preis 2012, Valery-Larbaud Prize 2013)
- Tristesse de la terre: Une histoire de Buffalo Bill Cody, récit, Arles, Actes Sud, coll.
- 14 juillet, récit, Arles, Actes Sud, 2016 – Prix Alexandre-Vialatte 2017 pour 14 juillet et pour l'ensemble de son œuvre, décerné par le groupe Centre France
- Tristesse de la terre (Joseph-Kessel Prize 2015)
  - Tristesse de la terre has been translated into English under the title Sorrow of the Earth.
- L'Ordre du jour (Prix Goncourt 2017)
  - The Order of the Day, English translation by Mark Polizzotti, Other Press, 2018, ISBN 978-1590519691 (Albertine Prize shortlist 2019)
- La guerre des pauvres, Actes Sud, 2019, ISBN 978-2-330-10366-8
  - The War of the Poor, English translation by Mark Polizzotti, Other Press, 2020, ISBN 978-1635420081 (International Booker Prize shortlist 2021)
- Une sortie honorable, Actes Sud, 2022, ISBN 978-2330159665
  - An Honorable Exit, English translation by Mark Polizzotti, Other Press, 2023, ISBN 978-1635423525

== Filmography ==
- 2002 La vie nouvelle
- 2006 L'homme qui marche
- 2008 Mateo Falcone
