= Nord-Sud (publication) =

French literary review (1917–1918)

- Editor: Pierre Reverdy
- Founded: 1917
- Ceased publication: 1918
- Language: French
- Headquarters: 12, Rue Cortot
- City: Paris
- ISSN: 1145-0037

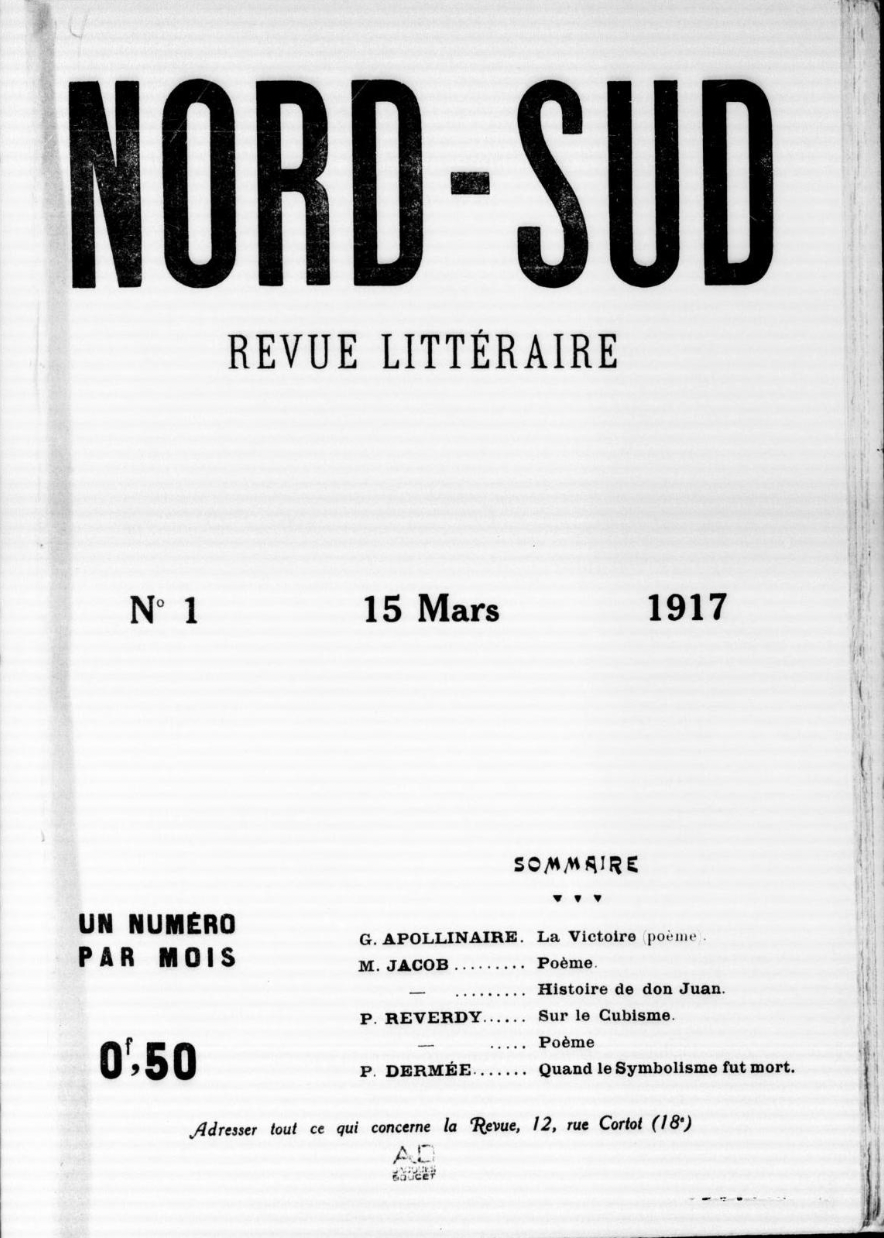
Title page of the first issue of Nord-Sud (15 March 1917)

Nord-Sud (English: "North-South") was a French poetry journal directed by the poet Pierre Reverdy. First appearing in March 1917, the magazine had a run of sixteen issues before going defunct in 1918. Between 100 and 200 copies were produced per issue.

From the editorial of the first issue, Reverdy strove to place the new journal under the star of Apollinaire, writing: "Once the young poets sought out Verlaine to rescue him from obscurity. Why would it be shocking that we've judged the moment right to group around Guillaume Apollinaire?"

== Name ==
The title Nord-Sud references the Nord-Sud Company, the railway company that constructed and operated the train line between Montmartre, in the north of Paris, and Montparnasse, in the south. Montmartre and Montparnasse were the two principal artistic centers of the time.

== History ==
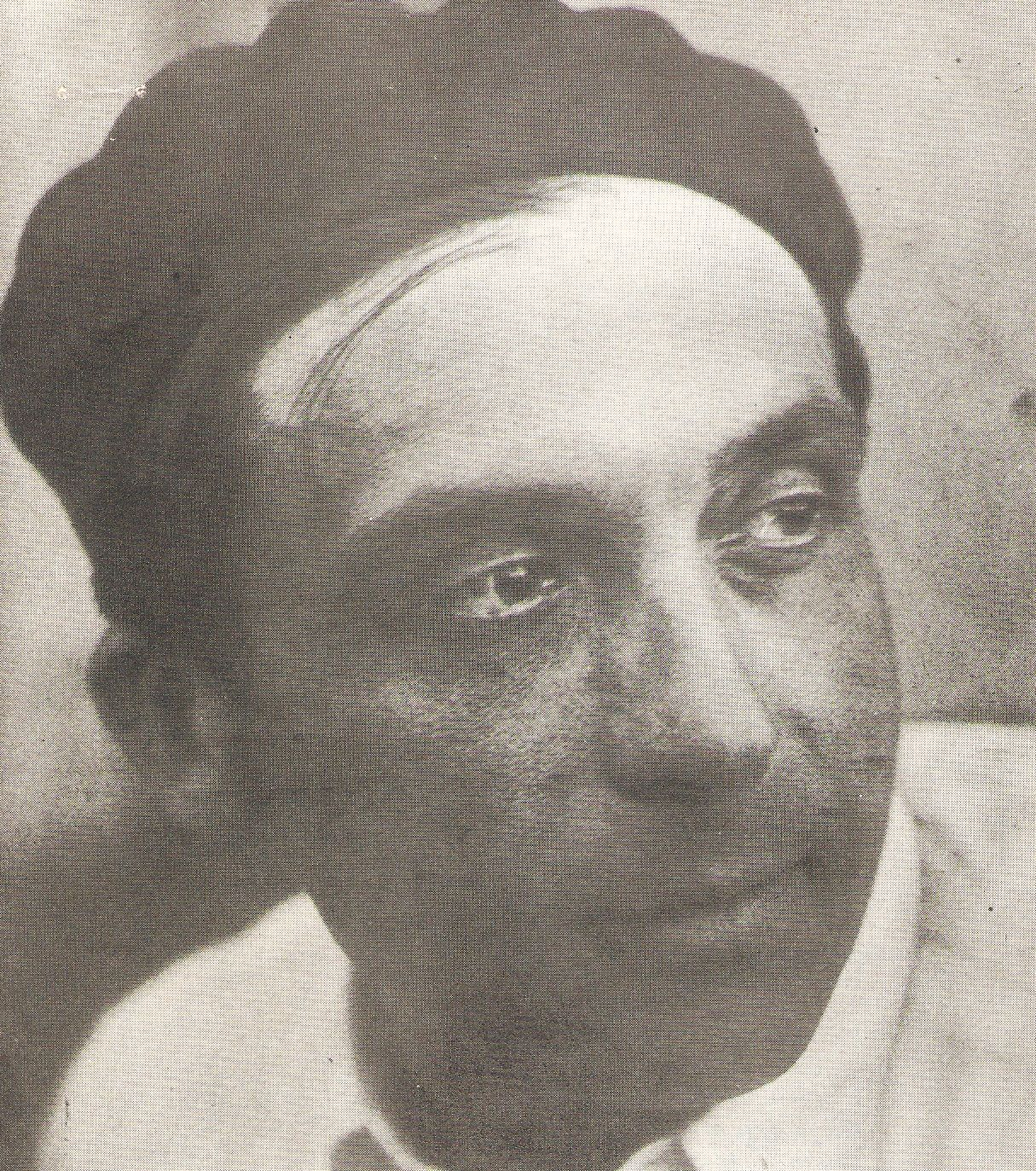
The poet Pierre Reverdy founded and edited the review.

Pierre Reverdy conceived the project at the end of 1916, a time when artistic life was stagnated by the continuing World War. He imagined it as a forum to display the parallels between the poetic theories of Guillaume Apollinaire, Max Jacob and himself, thus marking the beginning of a new age for poetry and artistic reflection. In its pages, he would expound his literary theories, as well as numerous reflections on cubism, notably focusing on his friends Pablo Picasso and Georges Braque. Joan Miró depicts the review in a painting bearing the same name, Nord-Sud (1916–1917), which he intended as a homage to Reverdy and associated artists.

== Editorial principles ==
In addition to rallying the poets associated with "literary cubism," the review also welcomed texts by the future Dadaists. Nord-Sud was the first French journal to publish Tristan Tzara, despite a certain mistrust on the part of Reverdy toward Tzara.

The aesthetic of Nord-Sud drew on the poetics of Edgar Allan Poe, Baudelaire and Mallarmé, as well as contemporary cubism and the poetry of Apollinaire. It was uninterested in prewar literary experiments like Unanimism and in the writers of the NRF, and it rejected the term "avant-garde."

== Form ==
Nord-Sud's form and layout were characterized by a "sober harmony." Its sparse title page, with its pictureless type, was designed with the assistance of Juan Gris. This soberness distinguishes the review from other avant-garde publications of the time. In a 1917 letter to Jacques Doucet, Max Jacob explained that Reverdy "raged at the fanciful typography of l'Élan and SIC."

== Distribution and financing ==
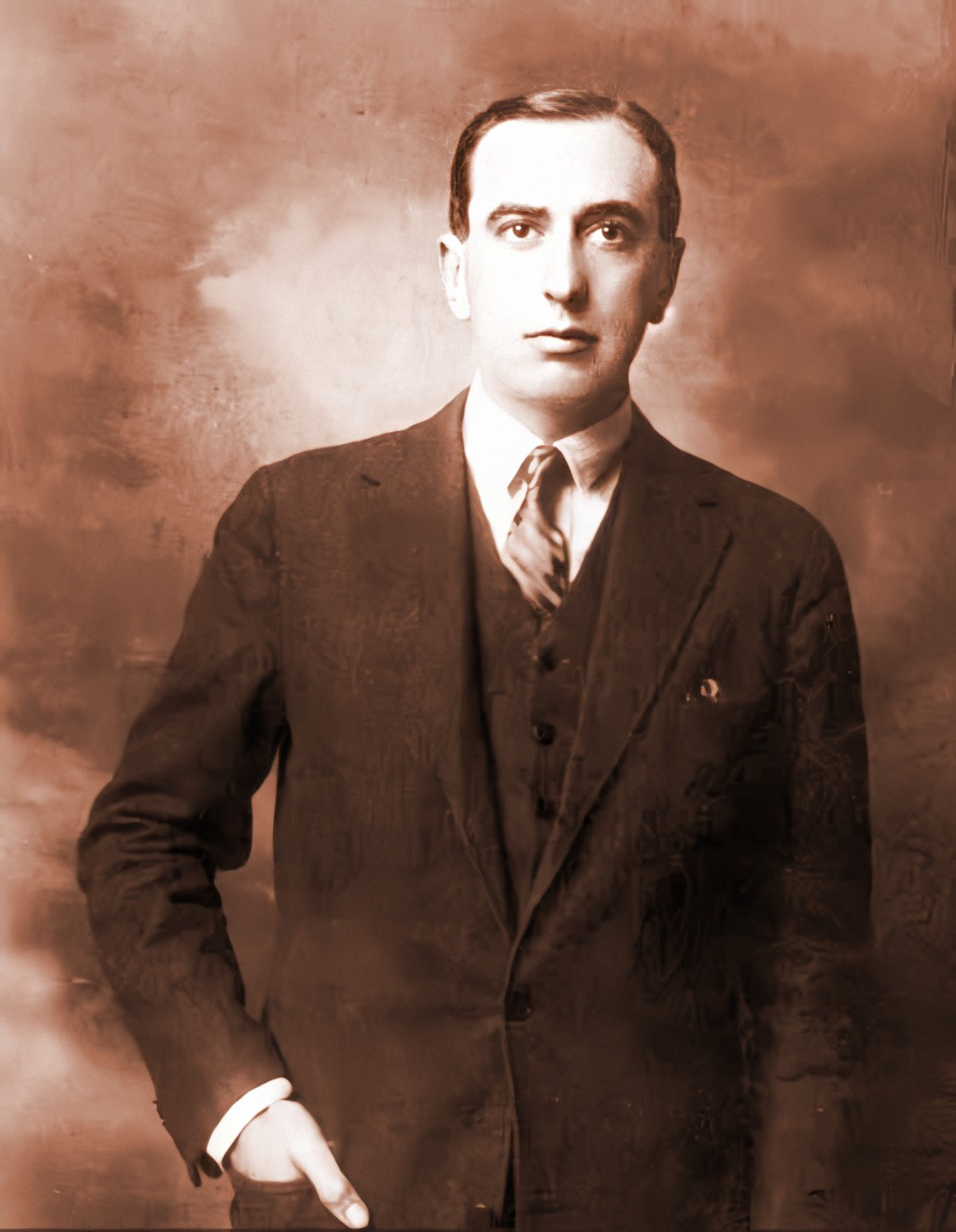
The Chilean poet Vicente Huidobro (1893–1948), was one of the review's patrons.

The review had a small print run of around 100 copies per issue. Its distribution was small-scale, relying principally on consignment sales in bookstores and art galleries.

Two patrons financed Nord-Sud: the poet Vicente Huidobro (whom Reverdy met through Pierre Albert-Birot) and Jacques Doucet.

== Exhaustive list of authors ==
- Guillaume Apollinaire
- Louis Aragon
- Georges Braque
- André Breton
- Jean Cocteau
- Paul Dermée
- Louis de Gonzague Frick
- Vincent Huidobro
- Max Jacob
- Fernand Léger
- Hélène Oettingen (under the pseudonyms Roch Grey and Léonard Pieux)
- Jean Paulhan
- Pierre Reverdy (sometimes under the pseudonyms Clément Milart and S. Laforêt)
- Léonce A. Rosenberg
- Alberto Savinio
- Justin-Frantz Simon
- Philippe Soupault
- Tristan Tzara
- Fritz-René Vanderpyl

== Bibliography ==
=== Primary sources ===
- Pierre Reverdy, Nord-Sud, 1917–1918, 16 numéros, accessibles en ligne sur Scopalto
- Pierre Reverdy (1997). Nord-Sud 1917-1918, revue littéraire : collection complète. Paris: Nouvelle éditions Place. ISBN 978-2-85893-034-0.
