= Greeks in France =

Greek diaspora in France

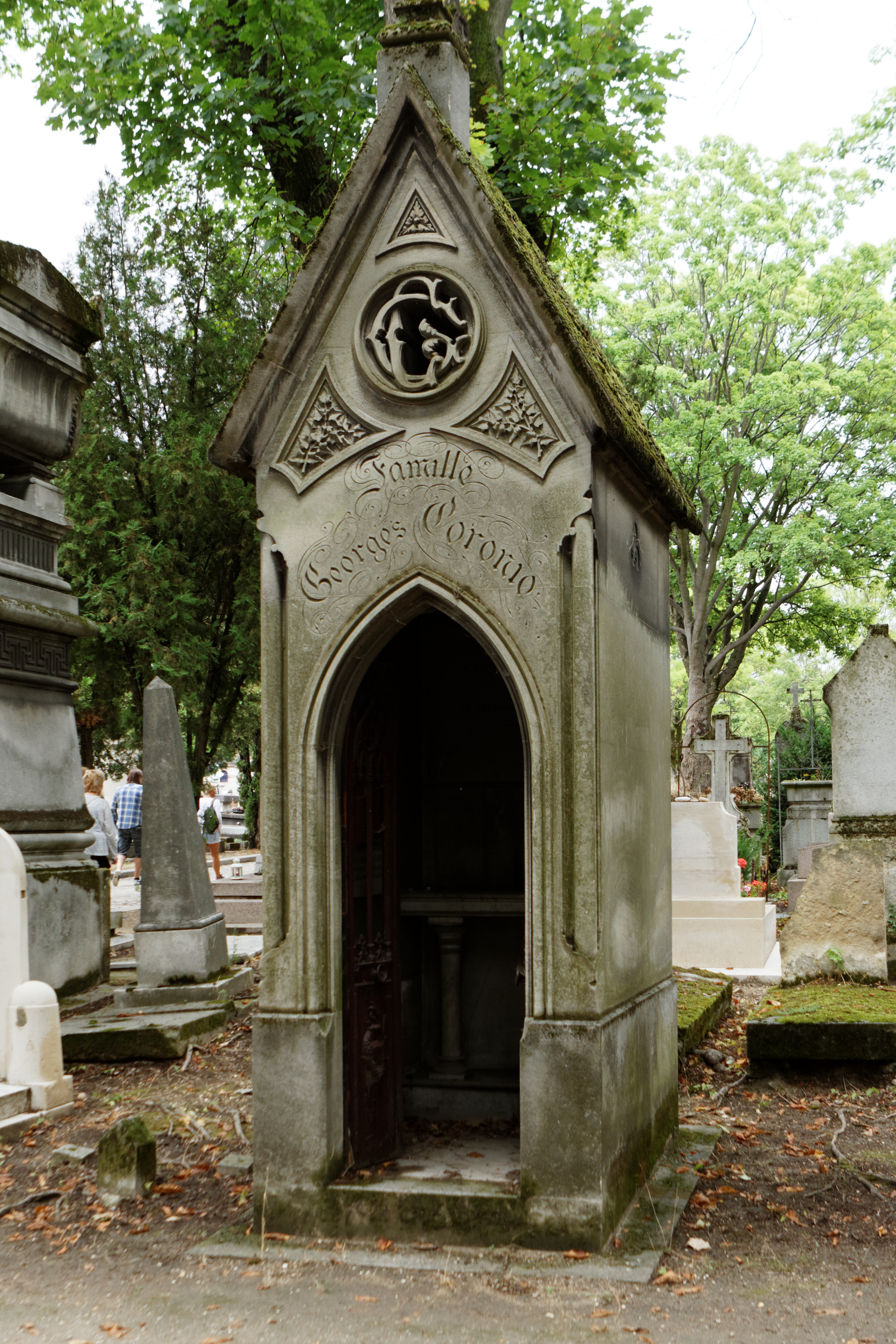
- Family tomb of George Coronio of Syros, Pere-Lachaise Cemetery

Total population
- 35,000 – 50.000 (2015)

Regions with significant populations
- Paris, Grenoble, Marseille, Corsica and southern France

Languages
- French, Greek

Religion
- Greek Orthodoxy, Catholicism, Atheism, Judaism

The Greek community in France numbers around 11,400 people (in 2017). They are located all around the country but the main communities are located in Paris, Marseille and Grenoble.

== Demographics ==
Greek citizens in France

Year	Pop.	±% p.a.
1901	2,902	—
1946	16,184	+3.89%
1968	9,000	−2.63%
1975	9,580	+0.90%
1980	9,516	−0.13%

Year	Pop.	±% p.a.
1990	6,091	−4.36%
1998	6,443	+0.70%
2003	4,959	−5.10%
2004	3,801	−23.35%
2009		—

Year	Pop.	±% p.a.
2015	29,000	—
2014	35,000	+17.14%
2015	50,000	+42.86%
2022	50,000	+0.00%

Source: Quid

== The Greeks of Marseille ==
Marseille, known as Massalia in Greek, was founded by Greeks from Ionia in 600 BC. The Massaliot Greeks are believed to have introduced viticulture to France. Notable ancient Greeks from Massalia included the great explorer and scientist Pytheas.

Historically the Greek community was composed of merchants, ship-owners, intellectuals and international traders. They participated in the city’s political life or became patrons of its cultural life and the philanthropic activity of some of them was crowned by the Légion d’Honneur.

== The Greeks of Corsica ==
Corsican Maniots are descendants of Maniots, who migrated to Corsica during the 400 year Ottoman rule over most of Greece. To this day the Cargèse region of Corsica is referred to as Cargèse la Grecque (Cargèse, the Greek). The origins of the Greek Maniots community in Corsica dates back to the end of the 17th century, when Greece was then under Ottoman Turk rule and there was a flow of Greek refugees from the Ottoman Empire. The Maniot Greeks were settled on the island and given lands for farming and animal grazing by the then ruling power, Genoa, as part of a Genoese policy to limit the spread and impact of an emergent Corsican nationalism violently opposed to foreign rule. The Maniots founded their four new villages in Paomia with their own church and culture. As a consequence, the pro-Genoese Greeks in Corsica became the targets of sustained attacks by Corsican nationalists and resentful farmers, and so had to be re-settled several times before finally being given territory around Cargese. Attempts at integrating Greeks into Corsican society involved the establishment of a mixed Greek-Corsican gendarmerie. Many Corsican Greeks subsequently left the island for French-ruled Algeria, in a wave of south European settlement of the North African colony sponsored by the French government, but returned to Corsica and elsewhere in France following Algerian independence. They have now become fully assimilated into Corsican and French society, through both intermarriage and education. In general this has resulted in Corsican Greeks losing their separate ethnic-religious identity and knowledge of the Greek language, with even older Cargese inhabitants of Greek ancestry having little if any ability to read or speak Greek, while some inhabitants still possess Corsicanized Greek names (like Garidacci etc.) and attend services in the Greek-Catholic church of Cargèse.

== Notable people ==
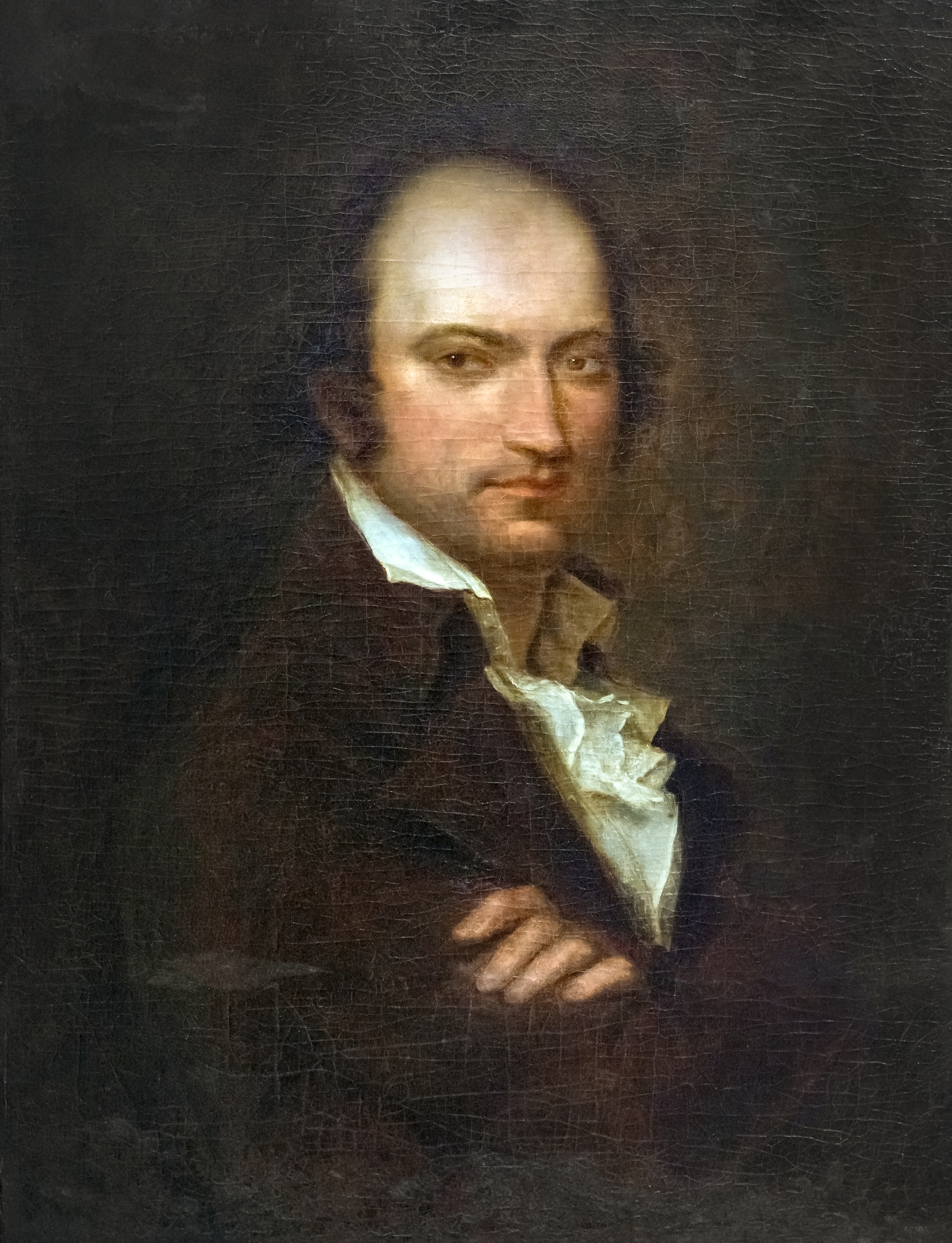
André Chénier

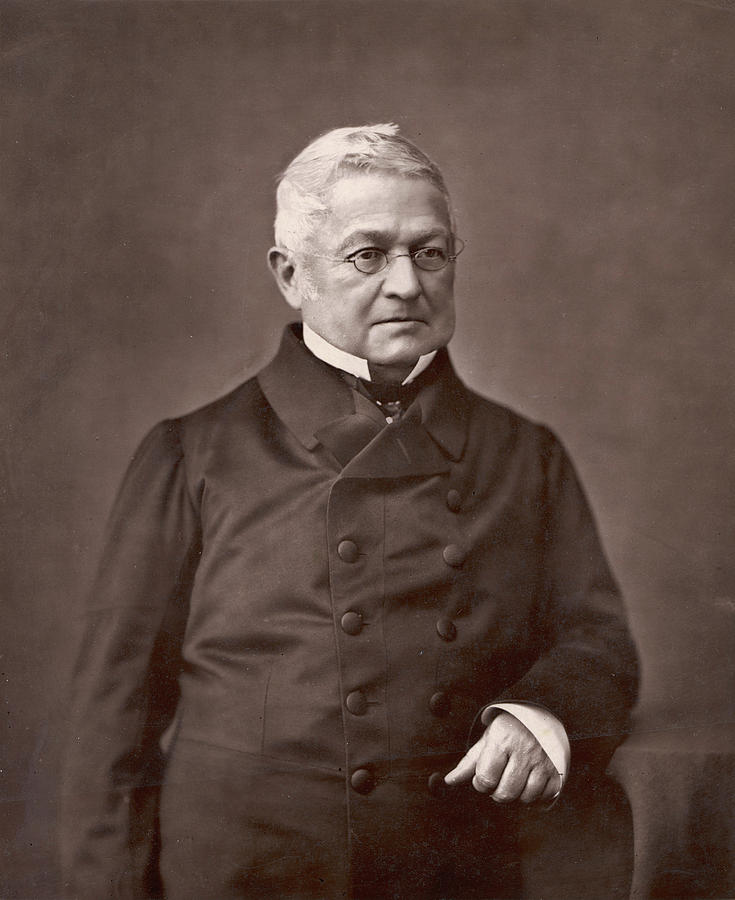
Adolphe Thiers

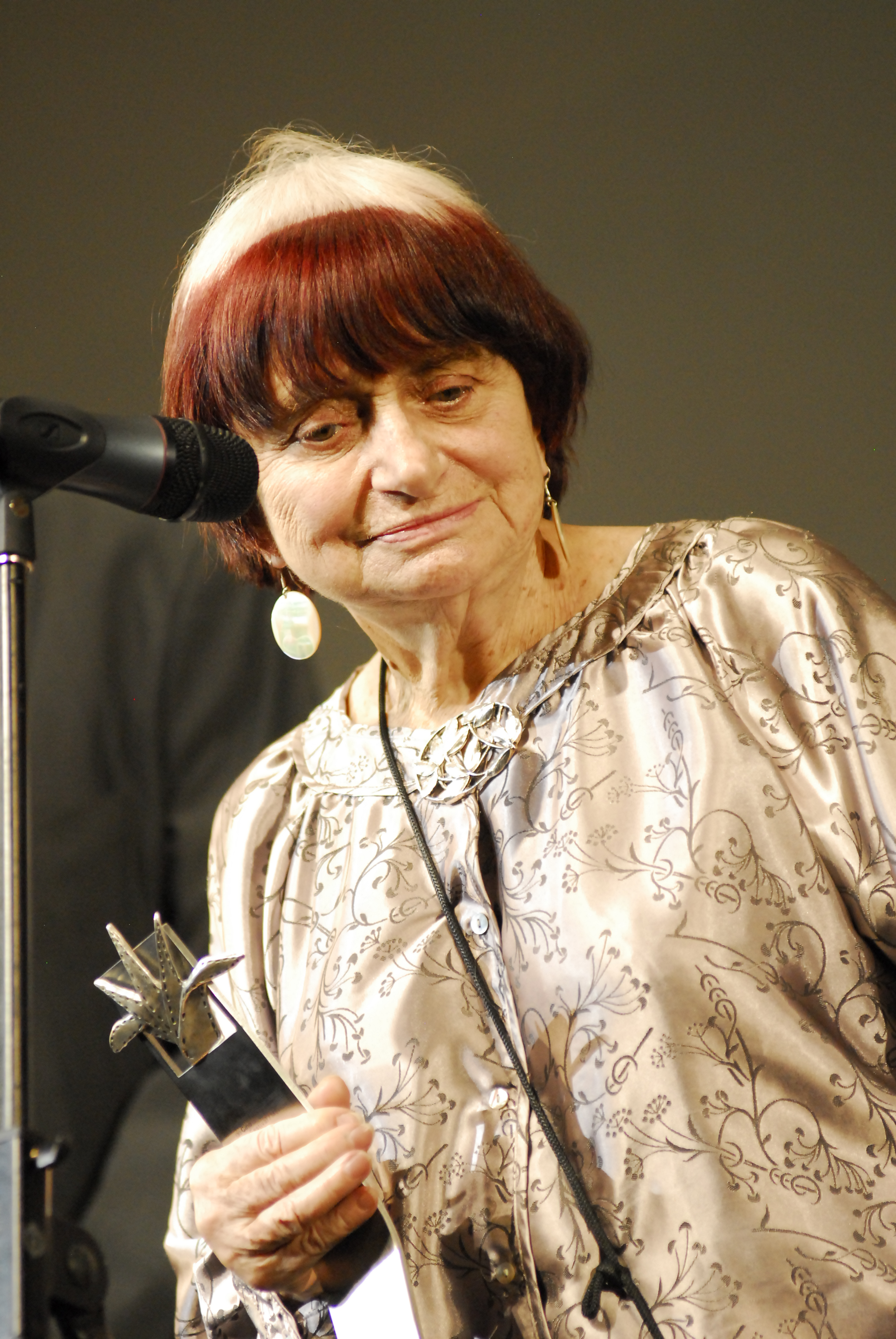
Agnès Varda

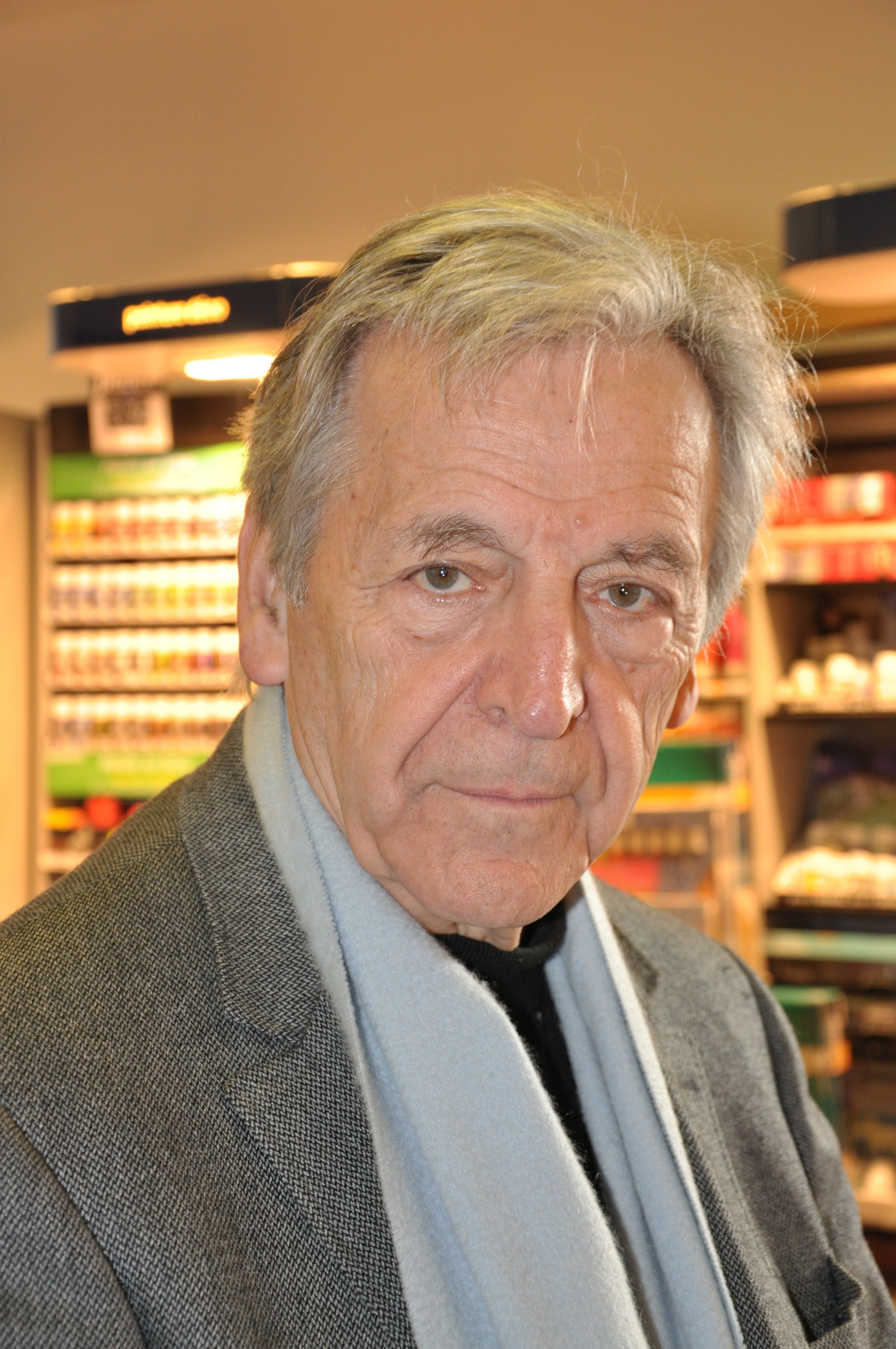
Costa Gavras

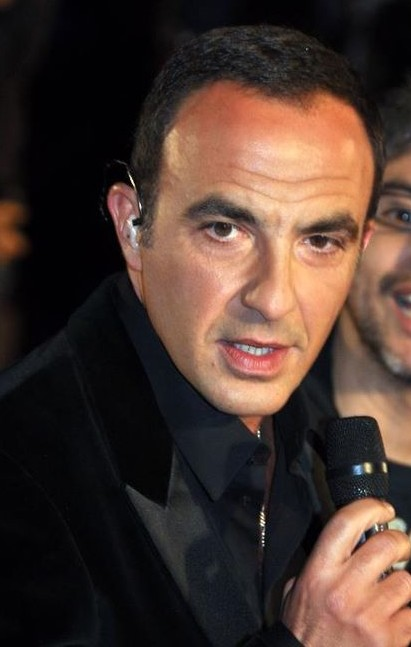
Nikos Aliagas

- Vincent, Count Benedetti
- Vassilis Alexakis
- Nikos Aliagas
- Constantine Andreou
- Anna Mouglalis
- Eugène Michel Antoniadi
- Roger Apéry
- Antonin Artaud
- Helene Ahrweiler
- Kostas Axelos
- Charles Denis Bourbaki
- Michel Dimitri Calvocoressi
- Jean-Christophe Cambadélis
- Cornelius Castoriadis
- André Chénier
- Joseph Chénier
- Iris Clert
- Georges Corraface
- Jacques Damala
- Diam's
- Dimitri from Paris
- Adèle Exarchopoulos
- Jean Focas
- Costa Gavras
- Romain Gavras
- Pierre Gripari
- John Iliopoulos
- Laure Junot, duchess d'Abrantès
- Taïg Khris
- Apo Lazaridès
- Clément Lépidis
- Georges Moustaki
- Juliette Gréco
- Savitri Devi Mukherji
- Anna de Noailles
- Gabriella Papadakis
- Georges Panayotis
- Nicos Poulantzas
- Gisèle Prassinos
- Mario Prassinos
- Nicolas Rossolimo
- Théo Sarapo
- Nicolas Sarkozy
- Joseph Sifakis
- Demetrio Stefanopoli
- Patrick Tatopoulos
- Tériade
- Agnès Varda
- Antonis Volanis
- Antonis Rikka
- Alexandre Desplat
- Ken Samaras

== See also ==
- Greek people
- Greek diaspora
- French people of Greek descent
- France–Greece relations
- Greeks in pre-Roman Gaul
- Greek Orthodox Metropolis of France

== Bibliography ==
- Gérard Blanken, Les Grecs de Cargèse (Corse). Recherches sur leur langue et leur histoire.T. I. Partie linguistique, Leyde, 1951 (recension in Revue des études byzantines)
- Marie-Anne Comnène, Cargèse: une colonie grecque en Corse, Société d'édition "Les Belles lettres", 1959, 92 pages
- Mathieu Grenet, La fabrique communautaire. Les Grecs à Venise, Livourne et Marseille, 1770-1840, Athens and Rome, École française d'Athènes and École française de Rome, 2016 (ISBN 978-2-7283-1210-8)
- Jean Coppolani, « Cargèse. Essai sur la géographie humaine d'un village corse », Revue de géographie alpine, Année 1949, Volume 37, n° 37-1, pp. 71–108
- Nicolaos Stephanopoli de Comnène, Histoire de la colonie grecque établie en Corse, Éditeur A. Thoisnier-Desplaces, 1826 (full scanned version on line)
