= Marcel Sauvage =

French journalist and writer

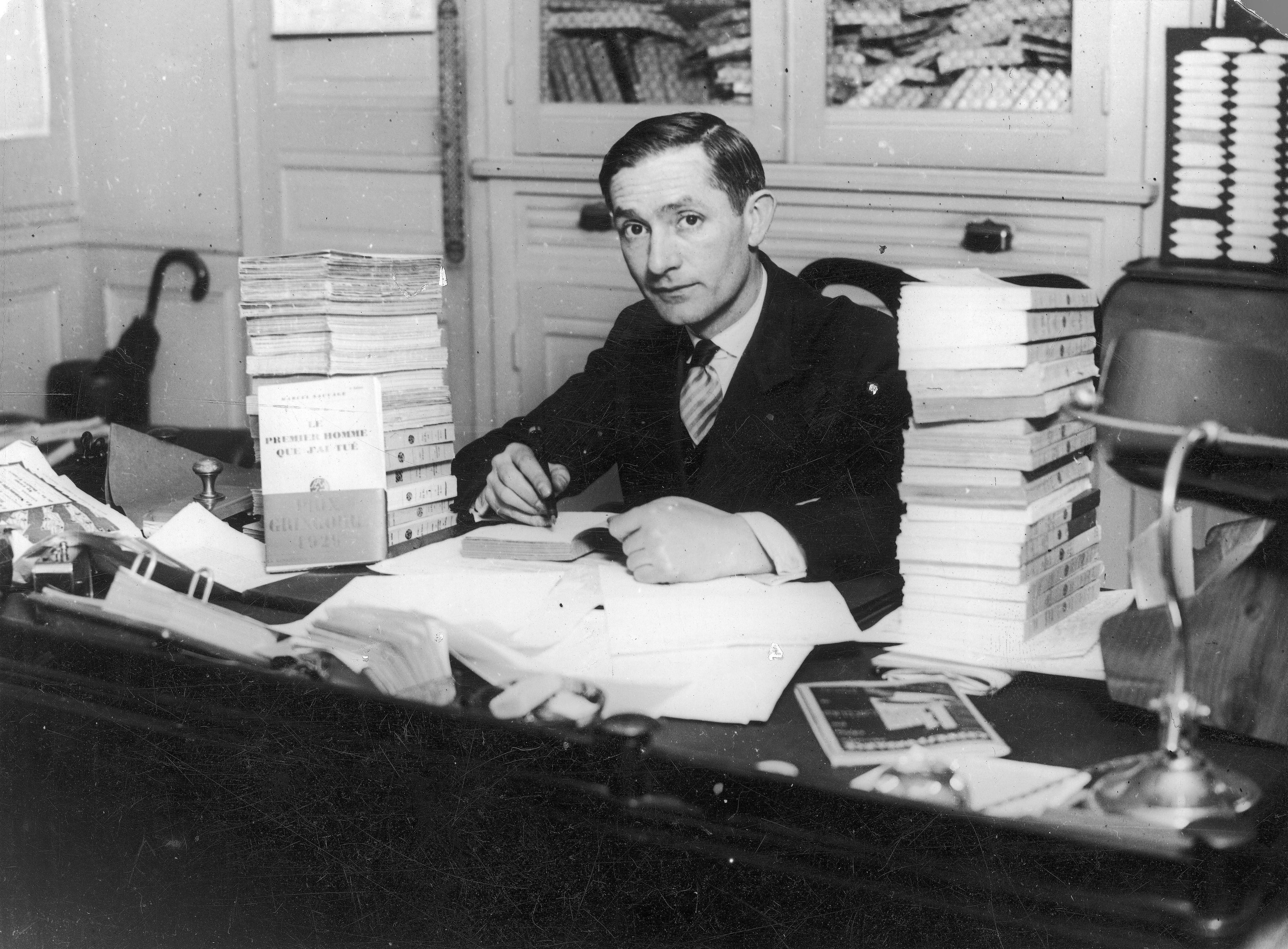
Marcel Sauvage, 1929

Marcel Sauvage (26 October 1895, Paris – 4 June 1988, Peymeinade) was a French journalist and writer.

== Biography ==
Marcel Sauvage was born in the 4th arrondissement of Paris. He fought in World War I, but was discharged after being seriously wounded. In 1920, under the influence of Max Jacob, he used his demobilisation bonus to found the magazine Action together with Florent Fels. As a writer, he published essays (Au rythme des idées, 1918), poetry (Quelques choses, 1919; Voyage en Autobus, 1921; Le Chirurgien des Roses, 1922; Cicatrices, 1923) and short stories (Le Premier Homme que j'ai tué, 1929). During the 1930's, he had several novels published by Éditions Denoël.

In May 1922, Sauvage attended the International Congress of Progressive Artists and signed the "Founding Proclamation of the Union of Progressive International Artists". From 1927, he was a member of the jury of the Prix Renaudot. In 1949, he became known as the ghostwriter of the memoirs of Josephine Baker.

Sauvage died in Peymeinade in 1988, aged 92.

=== Family ===
He was married to the novelist Paule Malardot, with whom he had one son.
