= SIC (magazine) =

French avant-garde art magazine (1916-1919)

- Editor: Pierre Albert-Birot
- Categories: Art magazine
- First issue: January 1916
- Final issue: December 1919
- Country: France
- Based in: Paris
- Language: French

SIC, subtitled Sons Idées Couleurs, Formes, was an avant-garde art magazine edited from January 1916 to December 1919 by French poet Pierre Albert-Birot. It featured arts and writings by cubists, Futurists, Dadaists and Surrealists and was the second Parisian magazine, after Nord-Sud, to distribute the texts of the Zürich Dadaists, namely those of Tristan Tzara. SIC was a focus for many avant-garde initiatives, even those which Albert-Birot himself disliked, according to his belief in independence and objectivity. At the end of its publication in 1919, SIC had published 53 issues.

== History ==
Pierre Albert-Birot escaped general mobilization due to respiratory insufficiency during World War I, and, according to his own words, was really born during the creation of the magazine SIC in 1916, when he definitively adopted his artist name, adding his second name to his surname.

The title of the review, represented by a SIC carved into wood framed by two symmetrical F's, has two meanings; it is firstly the Latin word yes, standing for "a desire to constructively oppose the war that negates human values" and more generally, a desire "to assert oneself through a complete acceptance of the world," and it is also the acronym for its subheading "Sons Idées Couleurs, Formes," which was an expression of the multiple activities of the Albert-Birot couple – Sounds for Germaine's music, Ideas for poetry, Colors for painting, and Forms for Pierre's sculpture – but aspired to become the motto for a "synthesis of modernist arts."

Issue number 1, sold for twenty centimes, appeared in January 1916, entirely written and illustrated by Pierre Albert-Birot. The publication stood out for its modernism, despite coming from a painter and sculptor trained by traditionalist Achard, a self-taught "Adamite poet" who had not yet encountered the avant-garde. "Our desire: to act. To take initiatives, not to wait for them to come from across the Rhine," is the first of the "First Words" displayed by SIC; an affirmation of originality as a condition of Art, "Art begins where imitation ends " which is not without evoking, although in a much less radical form, Dada's rejection of all imitation and literary tradition and life.

We see in the publication of this first issue the call, the outstretched hand of an isolated artist to avant-garde circles of which he was both completely unknown and ignorant. He mockingly calls Paul Claudel a ″beautiful poet of the day before yesterday″ and continues with ″I would really like to meet a poet of today″.

The first to respond to this call was not a poet but the painter Gino Severini, whose impetus made SIC a true avant-garde magazine, as Albert-Birot humorously explains:

″Severini already had quite a few years of combat and research into ultra-modern art behind him, since he had been with Marinetti, the creator of Futurism, for a long time; naturally, for him, the first issue of my magazine was quite timid, but after talking to me he had the feeling that I was ready to become a true warrior for the good cause.″

The second issue, published in February, is devoted to the discovery of Futurism. It reports on Severini's First Exhibition of Plastic Art of the War and other previous works, held at the Boutet de Monvel gallery from January 15 to February 1, 1916. Albert-Birot writes: "The picture, until now a fraction of space, becomes with futurism a fraction of time." Severini offers SIC a reproduction of his Train Arriving in Paris.

In addition, Severini convinces Guillaume Apollinaire to meet Albert-Birot. The meeting takes place in July 1916, at the Italian hospital, and immediately the two men became friends. Apollinaire introduces Albert-Birot to his many friends and brings his mentorship to the magazine. Apollinaire has his Tuesdays at the Café de Flore and SIC has its Saturdays, on rue de la Tombe-Issoire, where Apollinaire comes as soon as he is released from the hospital and brings his friends: André Salmon, Pierre Reverdy, Serge Férat, and Roch Grey.
