= Jean Loubes =

Jean Loubes, or Loubès, was a French writer and translator, the winner of the Prix des Deux Magots in 1946.

Jean Loubes was a member of the editorial board of the ephemeral magazine La Courte Paille (1929–1930).

== Selected work ==
- 1934: Usines de faux : 200 photographies et documents, with Paul Allard, Témoignages de notre temps issue n° 8, Les Illustrés français
- 1945: Le Don de vie, Éditions Fasquelle
- 1945: Le Regret de Paris, éditions Fasquelle, Prix des Deux Magots 1946
