= Catherine Rihoit =

French writer (born 1950)

- Born: 1950 (age 75–76); Caen, France
- Occupations: Writer; Screenwriter; Biographer

Catherine Rihoit (Born in Caen in 1950) is a French writer.

Portrait de Gabriel, her first novel, appeared in 1977. In 1979, she received the Prix des Deux Magots for Le bal des débutantes. Her 1982 novel La Nuit de Varennes ou l'Impossible n'est pas français was made into a film, That Night in Varennes, the same year.

Her writing is often on subjects around Roman Catholicism. She has written biographies of Thérèse of Lisieux (Plon, 1992), Brigitte Bardot (1986), Dalida, and Bernadette Soubirous (2009).

== Biography ==
A professor of linguistics at the Sorbonne, her early literary successes led her to become a writer. Portrait de Gabriel, her first novel, was published in 1977. In 1979, she received the Prix des Deux Magots for Le Bal des débutantes and the Académie Française awarded her the Prix Anaïs-Ségalas in 1980 for her work Les abîmes du cœur.

After the difficult reception of Triomphe de l'amour, she became a journalist for Paris Match, Marie Claire, and then F Magazine.

She has written biographies of Thérèse of Lisieux, La Petite Princesse de Dieu (The Little Princess of God), Brigitte Bardot, and Dalida.

== Selected works ==
- 1977: Autrement, ailleurs: poems
- 1978: Le bal des débutantes, Éditions Gallimard, Prix des Deux Magots
- 1978: Portrait de Gabriel, Gallimard, Prix Contrepoint
- 1980: Les Abîmes du cœur, Gallimard
- 1983: Soleil, Gallimard
- 1986: Brigitte Bardot, un mythe français, Olivier Orban
- 1988: Retour à Cythère
- 1992: La petite princesse de Dieu, Plon - (a biography of Thérèse of Lisieux)
- 1999: La Dame au loup, Stock
- 2002: La Chambre de feu
- 2005: Les Maîtres du sens: Bergman, Fassbinder, Lynch, Pasolini, Visconti et quelques autres..., Séguier
- 2007: Au Bonheur des chats
- 2009: Dalida: Mon frère tu écriras mes mémoires, Plon - (a biography of Dalida) with collaboration of Orlando
- 2009: J'ai vu: L'extraordinaire histoire de Bernadette Soubirous, Plon
