= L'Esprit de famille =

1943 novel by Jean Milo

L'Espirit de famille
- First Edition
- Author: Jean Milo
- Language: French
- Publication date: 1943
- Publication place: Belgium

L'Esprit de famille is a Belgian novel by Jean Milo. It was first published in 1943. It won the Prix des Deux Magots in 1944.
