= Pierre Jean Launay =

French writer (1900–1982)

Pierre Jean Launay (27 December 1900 – 23 April 1982) was a French writer. He was born in Carrouges in the Lower Normandy region. His novel Léonie la bienheureuse met with notable success, winning both the Prix Renaudot and the Prix des Deux Magots in 1938.

== Work ==
- 1937: Le maître du logis, Denoël et Steele.
- 1938: Léonie la bienheureuse, Denoël et Steele, Prix Renaudot and Prix des Deux Magots.
- 1941: Les Héros aux mains vides, Corrêa.
- 1946 : La mort rode aux carrefours - Aide-mémoire, Nouvelles, Corrêa.
- 1948 : Corps à cœur, Corrêa.
- 1950 : Ludovic le possédé, Corrêa.
- 1954 : Grèce, Hachette (collection Les albums des guides bleus).
- 1955 : Dans les pas des héros et des dieux, Hachette (collection Dans les pas).
- 1959 : Îles grecques, Hachette (collection Les albums des guides bleus).
- 1966 : Aux portes de Trézène, Grasset (collection Les cahiers verts).
- 1972 : La grande demeure, Grasset.
