= Louis-Henri de La Rochefoucauld =

French writer and musician

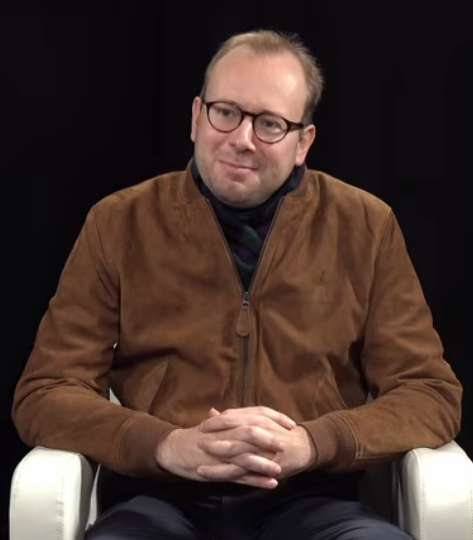
- In a 2025 interview
- Born: 2 March 1985 (age 41); Paris, France
- Education: Lycée Saint-Louis-de-Gonzague
- Occupations: Writer, Music critic, Literary critic
- Employer(s): GQ; Technikart; Schnock
- Parents: Philippe de La Rochefoucauld (father); Laure d'Harcourt (mother)
- Family: House of La Rochefoucauld
- Awards: Prix des Deux Magots; Prix Meurice; Prix Roger Nimier

Louis-Henri de La Rochefoucauld (born 2 March 1985) is a French writer and music and literary critic for the magazines GQ, Technikart, and Schnock.

== Biography ==
Louis-Henri de La Rochefoucauld was born in the 15th arrondissement of Paris in 1985. He entered the literary world in 2010 with his novel Les Vies Lewis, published by Léo Scheer.

He won the 89th Prix des Deux Magots on 25 January 2022, for his work Châteaux de sable. The following year, at the age of 38, he signed his first permanent contract as a literary critic for L'Express.

== Works ==
- 2010 : Les Vies Lewis, Léo Scheer
- 2011 : Un smoking à la mer, pub. Léo Scheer
- 2012 : Les Enfants trouvés, pub. Léo Scheer
- 2013 : La Révolution française, pub. Gallimard, coll. "L'Infini", ISBN 978-2070140145
- 2014 : Gaudriole au Golgotha, pub. Éditions Gallimard, coll. "L'Arpenteur"
- 2017 : Le Club des vieux garçons, pub. Stock
- 2019 : La prophétie de John Lennon, pub. Stock
- 2021 : Châteaux de sable, pub. Robert Laffont
- 2021 : Les sept péchés capitaux : l'avarice, pub. Cerf
- 2023 : Les petits farceurs, pub. Robert Laffont

== Articles ==
- "La Rochefoucauld, ancêtre de Guy Debord", revue L'Infini, nº 134, February 2016

== Awards ==
- 2019 : Prix Cazes Brasserie Lipp
- 2022 : Prix des Deux Magots
- 2022 : Prix Meurice
- 2022 : Prix de l'Académie française Maurice-Genevoix
- 2024 : Prix Roger Nimier
- 2025 : Prix Interallié

== See also ==
- House of La Rochefoucauld
