= Florent Fels =

French journalist (1891–1977)

Ferdinand Florent Fels (14 August 1891, Paris – 26 January 1977, Cap-d'Ail) was a French journalist, publisher and author prominent in discussing art in France. He often used the pseudonym Felsenberg.

In 1919 he pooled his demobilisation bonus with Marcel Sauvage to found the magazine Action: Cahiers individualistes de philosophie et d’art. Here they expressed an individualist anarchist philosophy.

In 1920 he organised a "counter-manifestation" against Dadaism. However, with the development of surrealism Fels' idealistic approach proved unpopular and the magazine closed in 1922.
