= Michel Haas =

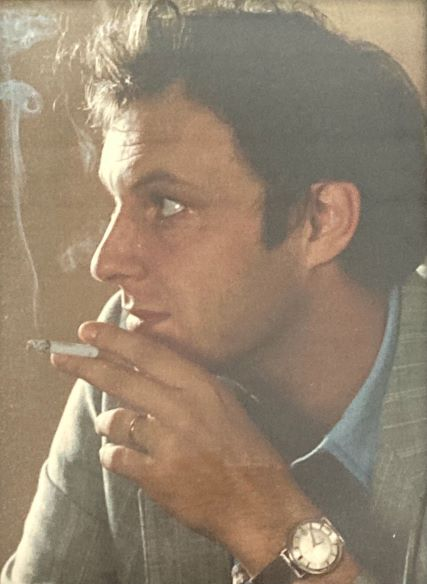
- Michel Haas
- Born: 1952 (age 73–74)
- Occupation: paleoanthropology

Michel Haas (born 1952) is a French writer and researcher in the field of paleoanthropology.

== Biography ==
A former student of the École normale supérieure and agrégé in philosophy in 1973, Michel Haas leeds a career in the academic world. He has taught in France and in the United States, particularly at Yale University (1982) in Connecticut, as a Senior Lecturer.

In addition, he has been working as a reader for the Olivier Orban and published the novel La Dernière Mise à mort which won the prix des Deux Magots in 1983.

He works today for the promotion of science in the field of paleoanthropology and lectures at the Collège des Bernardins.

== Works ==
- 1983: La Dernière Mise à mort — Prix des Deux Magots
- 1985: Amoureux fous de Venise (collective work)
