= René-Jean Clot =

French painter and novelist

René-Jean Clot (19 January 1913, Algiers – 4 November 1997, Clermont-Ferrand) was a French painter, and novelist. His novel, L'Enfant halluciné, won the 1987 Prix Renaudot.

He corresponded with Albert Camus.

== Works ==
- L’Annonciation à la licorne, coll. « Méditerranéennes » (n°1), Algiers: éditions Edmond Charlot, 1936
- Les Gages charnels de l'art français, éditions Charlot Alger, 1941
- Paysages africains, Tchad, Tibesti, Fezzan, Borkou, 1945
- Le noir de la vigne: roman, Gallimard, 1948
- Fantômes au soleil, éditions Gallimard, 1949
- Empreintes dans le sol, éditions Gallimard, 1950
- Le Poil de la bête, Gallimard, 1951 prix des Deux Magots
- Le Mat de cocagne, Gallimard, 1953
- Le Meunier, son fils, l'âne, 1954
- Le Bleu d'outre-tombe, Gallimard, 1956
- La Querelle des images, édition Pierre Cailler, 1960
- La révélation: pièce en quatre actes, Gallimard, 1961
- Le ramoneur de neige: récits, Gallimard, 1962
- Arc-en-enfer, Gallimard, 1963
- La rose de Noël, Gallimard, 1964
- Les Voix dans la cour, suivi de La nuit n'est pas si noire et de Un feu de bois vert, Gallimard, 1964
- Le Cœur pourpre, édition Pierre Cailler, 1965
  - La educación artística, Jean Wahl, Planeta, 1976, ISBN 978-84-320-0344-8
- Un amour interdit, éditions Grasset, 1984
- L'Enfant halluciné, 1987; Librairie générale française, 1989, ISBN 978-2-253-04833-6
- Le Mirage de l'orge, recueil de nouvelles, éditions l'Âge-d'Homme, 1987
- La Neige en enfer, éditions Moren-sell, 1988
- La Peinture aux abois, éditions Conti-Bourin, 1988
- Les Larmes de Lucifer, B. Grasset, 1989
- Une patrie de sel ou le souvenir d'Alger, librairie bleue. 1992
- Pourquoi les femmes pleurent elles, éditions Grasset et Fasquelle, 1997
- L'amour épouse sa nuit, éditions Grasset et Fasquelle, 1997
- Charhouz le voyant, éditions Grasset et Fasquelle, 1997
