= Bruno de Cessole =

French writer and literary critic

Bruno de Cessole (Note: He also wrote under the pen name Bruno Montclar (cf. Emmanuel Ratier [in French] (1993). Encyclopédie des pseudonymes. Vol. I. Paris: Faits et Documents. pp. 178, 284. ISBN 2-909-76910-0.).) (born 23 August 1950 in Nice) is a French writer and literary critic.

== Biography ==
The son of General Raymond de Cessole and Françoise Laubiès, Bruno de Cessole is a journalist for Le Figaro, L'Express, Le Point, a literary critic at Les Nouvelles littéraires and Les Lettres Françaises, as well as director of the Revue des deux Mondes.

He was then editor-in-chief of Jours de Chasse and of the cultural department of Valeurs actuelles, and collaborated with the Service littéraire.

In 2009, his novel L'Heure de la fermeture dans les jardins d'Occident won the prix des Deux Magots.

In 2015, he was awarded the Prix Henri-Gal for Literature of the Académie française for his entire body of work.

In early 2016, after the purchase of the newspaper by Étienne Mougeotte, Charles Villeneuve and Iskandar Safa, he left Valeurs actuelles.

Married to Béatrice Delettrez, a Professor of Law, he is the father of two sons and two daughters.

== Works ==
=== Novels ===
- 2008: L'Heure de la fermeture dans les jardins d'Occident. Paris: Éditions de La Différence. 2008. pp. 398. ISBN 978-2-7291-1776-4. LCCN 2008390254., Prix des Deux Magots 2009
- 2009: Le Moins Aimé. Paris: Éditions de La Différence. 2009. p. 283. ISBN 978-2-7291-1835-8.

=== Essays ===
- 1994: Nicholas d'Archimbaud; Bruno de Cessole; Séverine Jouve; Thierry Wolton [in French] (1994). Portraits d'hôtels. Albums reliés Art. Paris: Éditions Gallimard. p. 255. ISBN 978-2-07-058511-3.
- 1997: Bruno de Cessole; Jeanne Caussé (1997). Russie: 1837-1937. Paris: Éditions Maisonneuve & Larose. p. 437. ISBN 978-2-7068-1320-7. LCCN 98130349.
- 1998! Bruno de Cessole; Jeanne Caussé (1996). Les Trésors retrouvés de la Revue des deux Mondes. Paris: éditions Flammarion. p. 328. ISBN 978-2-08-067352-7. LCCN 00358985.
- 1999: Bruno de Cessole; et al. Les Livres de leur vie. Paris: Éditions du Centre Pompidou. ISBN 978-2-85850-809-9.
- 2001: Bruno de Cessole (2001). Propos intempestifs. Discordance. Paris: Éditions de La Différence. p. 284. ISBN 978-2-7291-1328-5. LCCN 2001386814.
- 2002: Nicholas d'Archimbaud; Bruno de Cessole; Jean-François Solnon [in French]; Frédéric Valloire (2002). Versailles. Paris: Éditions du Chêne. p. 300. ISBN 978-2-84277-447-9.
- 2002: Bruno de Cessole (2002). Ben Laden et le salut de l'Occident. Discordance. Paris: Éditions de La Différence. p. 96. ISBN 978-2-7291-1429-9.
- 2006: Philippe Dulac; Claude d'Anthenaise; Pierre Astié; Bruno de Cessole (2006). Vènerie d'antan, vènerie d'aujourd'hui: Tout change, rien ne change. Toulouse, France: Éditions Privat. p. 100. ISBN 978-2-7089-0533-7.
- 2010: Bruno de Cessole (7 October 2010). Le Petit Roman de la chasse. Monaco: Éditions du Rocher. p. 115. ISBN 978-2-268-06999-9. OCLC 683411558.
- 2011: Bruno de Cessole (2011). Le Défilé des réfractaires. Paris: l'Éditeur. p. 592. ISBN 978-2-36201-024-8. OCLC 713182878.
- 2014: Bruno de Cessole (2014). L'Internationale des francs-tireurs. Paris: l'Éditeur. p. 603. ISBN 978-2-36201-082-8.

== Notes and references ==
Notes
