= Philippe Hermann =

French writer

Philippe Hermann (1962, Arras) is a 20th–21st-century French writer, winner in 2000 of the Prix des Deux Magots and the Cino Del Duca scholarship with his novel La Vraie Joie.

- 1998: Technicien chair, (ISBN 2714436013)
- 2000: La Vraie Joie, Prix des Deux Magots
- 2001: Comment disparaître complètement, (ISBN 2720214396)
- 2003: Souvenirs glorieux, (ISBN 2720214965)
- 2016: La Patrie nocturne, (ISBN 978-1537636603)
