= Michel Crépu =

French writer and literary critic

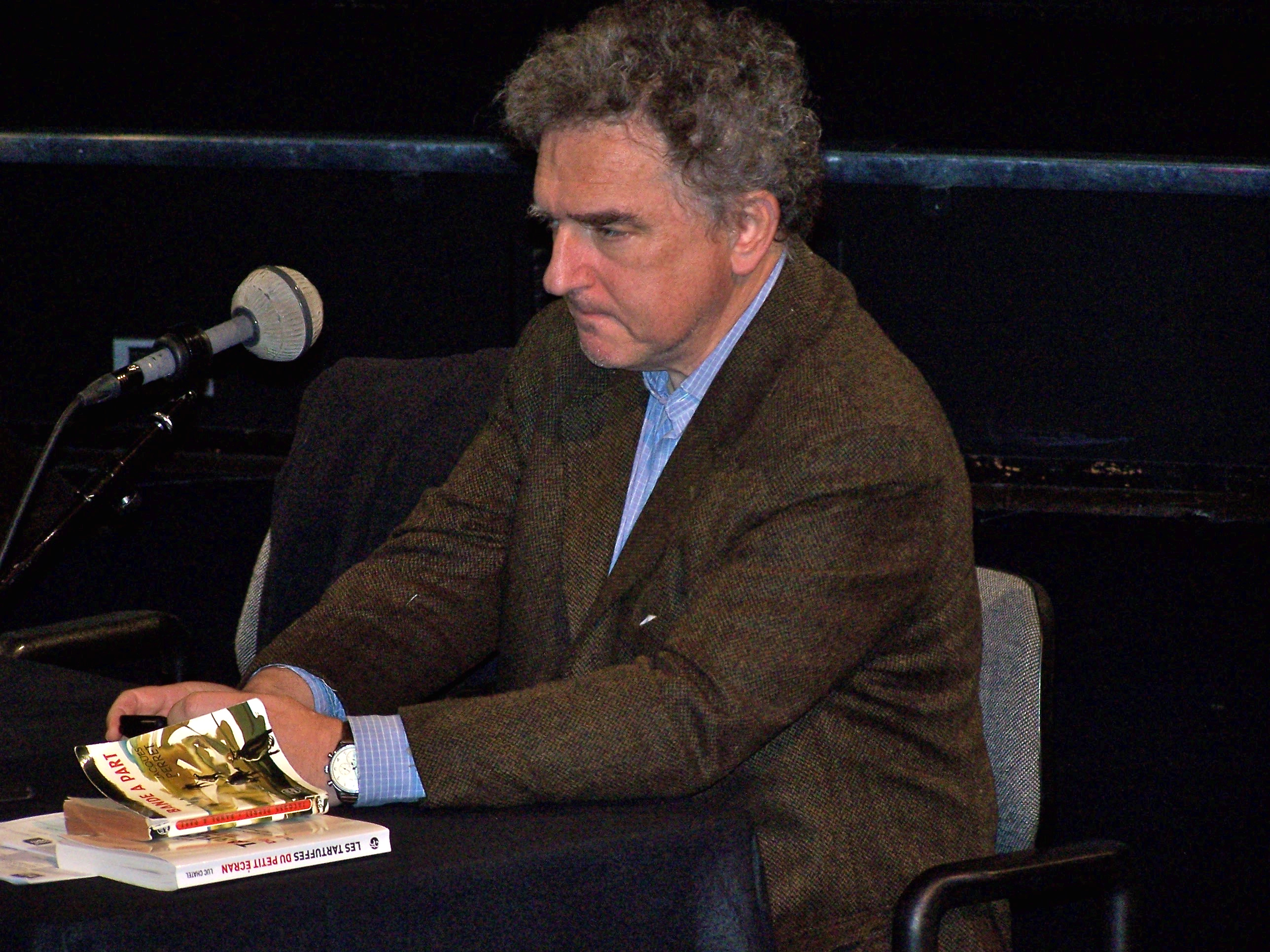
Michel Crépu In November 2012 during Le Masque et la Plume.

Michel Crépu (born 24 August 1954 in Étampes) is a French writer and literary critic as well as the editor-in-chief of Nouvelle Revue française since 2015.

== Biography ==
As a journalist, Michel Crépu is a literary critic. He was responsible for the literary pages of the Catholic newspaper La Croix before becoming editor in 2002 and then in 2010 the director of the Revue des deux Mondes. He is also a literary critic at Le Masque et la Plume on France Inter, Tout arrive on France Culture and collaborates on a variety of newspapers including the Romanian Observator Cultural.

Michel Crépu is also a writer, an essayist and novelist. He has published Le Tombeau de Bossuet which received the "Prix Femina Vacaresco" now replaced by the prix Femina essai and the Grand prix de la Critique littéraire of the Académie française as well as Le Souvenir du monde, rewarded by the prix des Deux Magots.

In January 2015, he was appointed chief editor of Nouvelle Revue française by Antoine Gallimard and to the reading committee of the éditions Gallimard.

== Work ==
- 1988: La Force de l'admiration, Autrement
- 1990: Charles Du Bos ou la Tentation de l'irréprochable, éditions du Félin
- 1995: Dieu est avec celui qui ne s'en fait pas (chronique autobiographique), NiL Éditions, 1995.
- 1997: Le Tombeau de Bossuet (essay), éditions Grasset – (Prix Femina Vacaresco) Prix Femina essai and Grand Prix de la critique
- 1998: Bourdieu et les Forces du mal
- 1999: La Confusion des lettres (essay), éditions Grasset
- 2001: Sainte-Beuve : portrait d'un sceptique, éditions Perrin
- 2004: Quartier général (noel), éditions Grasset
- 2006: Solitude de la grenouille, éditions Flammarion
- 2006: Le Silence des livres suivi de Ce vice encore impuni, with George Steiner, Arléa, 2006.
- 2009: Lecture : journal littéraire 2002-2009, éditions Gallimard, series L'Infini
- 2011: Le Souvenir du monde: essai sur Chateaubriand, éditions Grasset – prix des Deux Magots 2012.
- 2012: En découdre avec le pré (essay on Philippe Jaccottet), éditions des Crépuscules
- 2014: Écrire, écrire, pourquoi ? Linda Lê: Interview with Michel Crépu
- 2014: Écrire, écrire, pourquoi ? Yannick Haenel: Interview with Michel Crépu
- 2015: Un jour, éditions Gallimard, series "Blanche"

== Articles ==
- "Cioran, le barbare subtil," in L'Atelier du roman, n° 64, Flammarion, 2010, pp. 105-107
- "L'apparition de Michel Houellebecq," in Le Débat, n° 210, Gallimard, 2020, pp. 217-22
