= Jean-Claude Pirotte =

Belgian writer, painter and poet

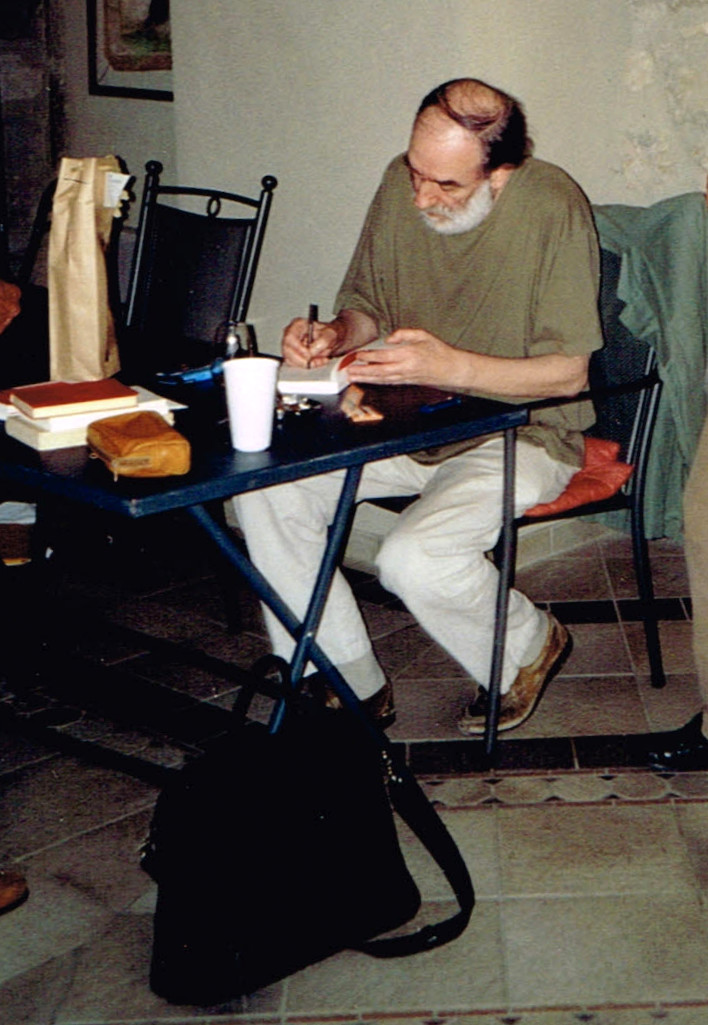
- Pirotte singing a copy of his book at a priory in Aude, 2005
- Born: 20 October 1939; Namur, Belgium
- Died: 24 May 2014 (aged 74)
- Occupations: Writer; Poet; Painter

Jean-Claude Pirotte (20 October 1939 – 24 May 2014) was a Belgian writer, poet and painter. A French language writer, his 2006 novel, Une adolescence en Gueldre, won the Prix des Deux Magots.

== Life ==
=== Early years ===
Jean-Claude Pirotte was born in Namur a couple of months after the German army had invaded and occupied Belgium. He grew up in nearby Gembloux. Both his parents were language teachers. During the Second World War his father worked with the Resistance, but Jean-Claude found him cold and "military" towards his own family. Pirotte later said he had hated his father: sources record a "tormented" childhood.

=== First career choice ===
Pirotte's first "official" publication was of a book of poetry entitled 'Goût de cendre' (Taste of cinders), published in 1963. Contrary to the expectations of some who knew him at the time, he studied law, however, and pursued a lucrative career as a lawyer between 1964 and 1975, practicing as a successful advocate at the Namur Bar. He was excluded from the legal profession in 1975 because of an offence alleged, and which he would always deny, that he had assisted the escape from prison of one of his clients. Pirotte was also condemned to an eighteen-month prison term. However, rather than staying to argue his case with the judges he took an opportunity to step into his red MG and escape to France, moving on later to Catalonia and then to the Aosta Valley. Having left his wife and children behind in Belgium, he led a "vagabond existence" and managed to avoid capture for the next five years. At the end of that time his sentencing had reached the end of its "shelf-life", and Jean-Claude Pirotte was able to return to Namur and go about his daily life.

Jean-Claude Pirotte: Bibliography (not a complete list)
- Goût de cendre poèmes, Thone, 1963
- Contrée poèmes, Thone 1965
- D'un mourant paysage poèmes, Thone 1969
- Journal moche essai, Luneau-Ascot, 1981, 1993.
- La Pluie à Rethel roman, Luneau-Ascot, 1982; rééd. La Table Ronde, Paris, 2001, 2002
- Fond de cale roman, Le Sycomore, 1984; rééd. Le Temps qu'il fait, 1991
- Un été dans la combe roman, La Longue Vue, 1986, rééd. La Table Ronde, Paris, 1993
- La Vallée de misère poèmes, Le temps qu'il fait, 1987, rééd. Le Temps qu'il fait, 1997
- Les Contes bleus du vin chroniques, Le Temps qu'il fait, 1988
- Sarah, feuille morte roman, Le Temps qu'il fait, 1989
- La Légende des petits matins roman, Manya 1990, rééd. La Table Ronde, Paris, 1996
- L'Épreuve du jour enfantine, Le Temps qu'il fait, 1991, 1998
- Fond de cale roman, Le Temps qu'il fait, 1991.
- Récits incertains mélanges, Le Temps qu'il fait, 1992
- Il est minuit depuis toujours essais, La Table Ronde, Paris, 1993
- Lettres de Sainte Croix du Mont (photographies de Jean-Luc Chapin), L'Escampette, 1993
- Plis perdus mélanges, La Table Ronde, Paris, 1994
- Un voyage en automne récit, La Table Ronde, Paris, 1996
- Cavale roman, La Table Ronde, Paris, 1997
- Boléro roman, La Table Ronde, Paris, 1998
- Faubourg poèmes, Le Temps qu'il fait, 1997, 1998
- Le Noël du cheval de bois conte illustré, Le Temps qu'il fait, 1997,1998
- Mont Afrique roman, Le Cherche Midi, 1999
- Autres arpents chroniques, La Table Ronde, Paris, 2000
- Enjoués monostiches (avec Jean-Marie Queneau), La Goulotte, 2000
- Ange Vincent roman, La Table Ronde, Paris, 2001
- Les Chiens du vent (avec Pierre Silvain), Cadex, 2002
- Rue des Remberges prélude, Le Temps qu'il fait, 2003
- Un rêve en Lotharingie récit, National Geographic et Stock, 2003
- Dame et dentiste poèmes, Inventaire/Invention, 2003
- Fougerolles poèmes, Virgile, 2004
- La Boîte à musique (avec Sylvie Doizelet) poèmes, La Table ronde, 2004
- Une adolescence en Gueldre roman, La Table ronde, 2005, Prix des Deux Magots
- Expédition nocturne autour de ma cave récit, Stock, 2006
- Un bruit ordinaire suivi de Blues de la racaille poèmes, La Table Ronde, 2006
- Hollande poèmes et peintures, Le Cherche Midi, 2006
- Un voyage en automne, La Table Ronde, 1996
- Absent de Bagdad roman, La table ronde, 2007
- Passage des ombres, La Table Ronde, 2008, prix Roger-Kowalski et grand prix de Poésie de la Ville de Lyon 2008
- Revermont, Le Temps qu'il fait, 2008
- Avoir été, Le Taillis Pré, 2008
- Le Promenoir magique et autres poèmes 1953–2003, La table ronde, 2009
- Voix de Bruxelles (avec Hugues Robaye), CFC, 2009
- Autres séjours, Le Temps qu'il fait, 2010
- Cette âme perdue, Le Castor Astral, 2011, prix Apollinaire 2011
- Place des savannes, Le Cherche Midi, 2011
- Ajoie, La Table ronde, 2012,
- Le très vieux temps, Le Temps qu'il fait, 2012
- Vaine pâture, Mercure de France, 2013
- Brouillard, Le Cherche Midi, 2013
- Gens sérieux s'abstenir, Le Castor Astral, 2014
- Portrait craché, Le Cherche Midi, 2014
- À Saint-Léger suis réfugié, L'Arrière-Pays, 2014

=== Second career choice ===
He nevertheless resisted any temptation to return to his career as a lawyer, explaining that his clash with the judiciary had given him an opportunity to escape, and the magistrates who had sentenced him to a prison had in a sense done him a favour, because they had given him the opening to live an unconventional live-style. Instead of the law, he devoted the balance of his life to literature and poetry, publishing nearly fifty books, substantial articles, and poems. He was also a painter and applied this talent to illustrating several books.

=== Growing public profile ===
Commentators on French language Belgian literature started to notice Pirotte towards the end of the 1980s. His novel "Sarah feuille morte" (1989) drew attention, as did "La pluie à Rethel", a novel originally published in 1982 and then reissued in 2001 and again in 2002. Pirotte was a lover of literature in both French and Flemish/Dutch. An eloquent admirer of writers such as André Dhôtel, Georges Bernanos, Guido Gezelle, Frederik van Eeden, Georges Rodenbach or Jacques Chardonne, Pirotte himself became a member of his generation's literary elite.

=== Final decades ===
Between 1998 and 2002 Pirotte settled near Carcassonne, where he created a literary prize named after the wines of his adopted region, "prix littéraire Cabardès". As a further tribute to the locality he became the "director" of a literary series entitled "Lettres du Cabardès" which was produced by the publishing house Le Temps qu'il fait.

During his later years Pirotte lived with the translator and fellow author Sylvie Doizelet in the French Jura, till 2009 at Arbois, and subsequently across the frontier, at Beurnevésin. In an interview given in 2011 he stated that they also still rented "a loft" on the Belgian coast. By this time Jean-Claude Pirotte was cursed with cancer, from which he died in the summer of 2014.

== Recognition ==
With supporters from the literary establishment that included Jean-Edern Hallier, Pirotte became a familiar figure in the francophone media-literary scene during the 1980s and 1990s.

=== Awards (not a complete list) ===
- 1963 Franz de Wever prize
- 1986 Victor Rossel Prize for Un été dans la combe
- 1993 Grand Prix de Poésie du Mont-Saint-Michel (now renamed, Grand Prix International de Poésie Guillevic-Ville de Saint-Malo)
- 2002 Marguerite-Duras Prize for Autres arpents
- 2006 Prize of Les Deux Magots for Une adolescence en Gueldre
- 2008 Roger Kowalski Prize for Passage des ombres
- 2009 Maurice Carême Prize
- 2009 Louis Montalte Prize for poetry
- 2011 Guillaume Apollinaire Prize for Cette âme perdue et Autres séjours
- 2011 Marcel Thiry Prize for Autres Séjours
- 2011 Pierre Mac Orlan Prize for Place des savannes
- 2012 Académie française top Poetry Prize
- 2012 Goncourt Poetry Prize
