= That Night in Varennes =

- French poster for film
- Directed by: Ettore Scola
- Screenplay by: Sergio Amidei; Ettore Scola
- Based on: La Nuit de Varennes ou l'Impossible n'est pas français 1982 novel by Catherine Rihoit
- Produced by: Renzo Rossellini
- Starring: Jean-Louis Barrault; Marcello Mastroianni; Hanna Schygulla; Harvey Keitel
- Cinematography: Armando Nannuzzi
- Edited by: Raimondo Crociani
- Music by: Armando Trovajoli
- Distributed by: Gaumont Distribution
- Release date: 15 May 1982
- Running time: 150 minutes
- Countries: France; Italy
- Languages: French; Italian

That Night in Varennes (Italian: Il mondo nuovo; French: La Nuit de Varennes) is a 1982 French-Italian drama film directed by Ettore Scola. It is based on a novel by Catherine Rihoit. It tells the story of a fictional meeting among Restif de la Bretonne, Giacomo Casanova, Thomas Paine, and Sophie de la Borde (a lady-in-waiting to the queen). They all travel together in a coach that is a few hours behind the one that is carrying King Louis XVI and Marie Antoinette in their flight to Varennes during the French Revolution.

The film was entered into the 1982 Cannes Film Festival. The film was nominated for Best Foreign Language Film by the U.S. National Board of Review of Motion Pictures.

== Plot ==
In 1791, French novelist Nicolas-Edme Restif patronizes at a local brothel where he learns from a maid at the Royal Palace that Louis XVI may attempt to escape from Paris. When he returns home, Restif learns from his daughter and incestuous lover Agnès that Thomas Paine is traveling to Metz.

Intrigued to witness the king's escape, Restif wants to accompany those inside the carriage, but he is turned away. The carriage transports Paine; Countess Sophie de la Borde; wealthy industrialist De Wendel; Italian opera singer Virginia Capacelli; wealthy widow Madame Adélaïde Gagnon; and Monsieur Jacob, a prissy hairdresser. Restif catches up with the carriage on horseback. Along the way, they stop in Meaux, where Restif learns that Louis XVI may have left Paris earlier at midnight. Paine uses a map to chart the king is headed for Montmédy, near the France–Luxembourg border.

They resume their journey where they stop for Giacomo Casanova, who has been left stranded along the road. Sophie is immediately attracted to him. With no other choice, Casanova joins them for the ride. Inside the carriage, Casanova's reputation is well known to the passengers, though he reveals he is destitute. He also correctly guesses the background of each female passenger, including Sophie who is a lady-in-waiting. Outside, Paine and De Wendel discuss their political ideologies, concerning the abolition of slavery and the philosophy of natural rights.

The carriage makes another stop, where they learn General Lafayette has ordered for citizens to have Louis XVI and the royal family arrested and returned to the National Assembly. An argument ensues between Paine and Sophie, who supports the French nobility for being charitable and believes in the king's divine right to rule. Paine responds the French citizenry demand their rights, not charity, and believes the divine right of kings is illegitimate. Meanwhile, Casanova leaves separately to head back to Dux, Bohemia.

As the carriage heads towards Metz, Restif reunites with Casanova, who explains he has invited back to his famed Dux Castle by Count Waldstein. Before long, news spreads that Louis XVI and Marie Antoinette have been arrested by Jean-Baptiste Drouet, the local postmaster. As the carriage drives to Varennes, Sophie apologizes to Paine and is forced to reconcile the end of the French monarchy.

The royal family are held captive where they are taken back to Paris. Louis is publicly executed on 21 January 1793 and Marie Antoinette is guillotined on 16 October. As Restif recollects his experiences in the 1792 book The Nights of Paris, he walks into a modern-day, liberated France.

== Cast ==
- Jean-Louis Barrault as Nicolas-Edme Restif de la Bretonne
- Marcello Mastroianni as Giacomo Casanova, Chevalier de Seingalt
- Hanna Schygulla as Countess Sophie de la Borde
- Harvey Keitel as Thomas Paine
- Jean-Claude Brialy as Monsieur Jacob
- Andréa Ferréol as Madame Adélaïde Gagnon
- Michel Vitold as De Florange
- Laura Betti as Virginia Capacelli
- Pierre Malet as Emile Delage, student revolutionary
- Enzo Jannacci as the Italian clown
- Daniel Gélin as De Wendel
- Didi Perego as Madame Sauce
- Caterina Boratto as Madame Faustine
- Dora Doll as Nanette Precy
- Hugues Quester as Jean-Louis Romeuf
- Jean-Louis Trintignant as Monsieur Sauce
- Michel Piccoli as King Louis XVI
- Evelyne Dress as Agnès Restif
