= Jean Milo =

Belgian painter (1906–1993)

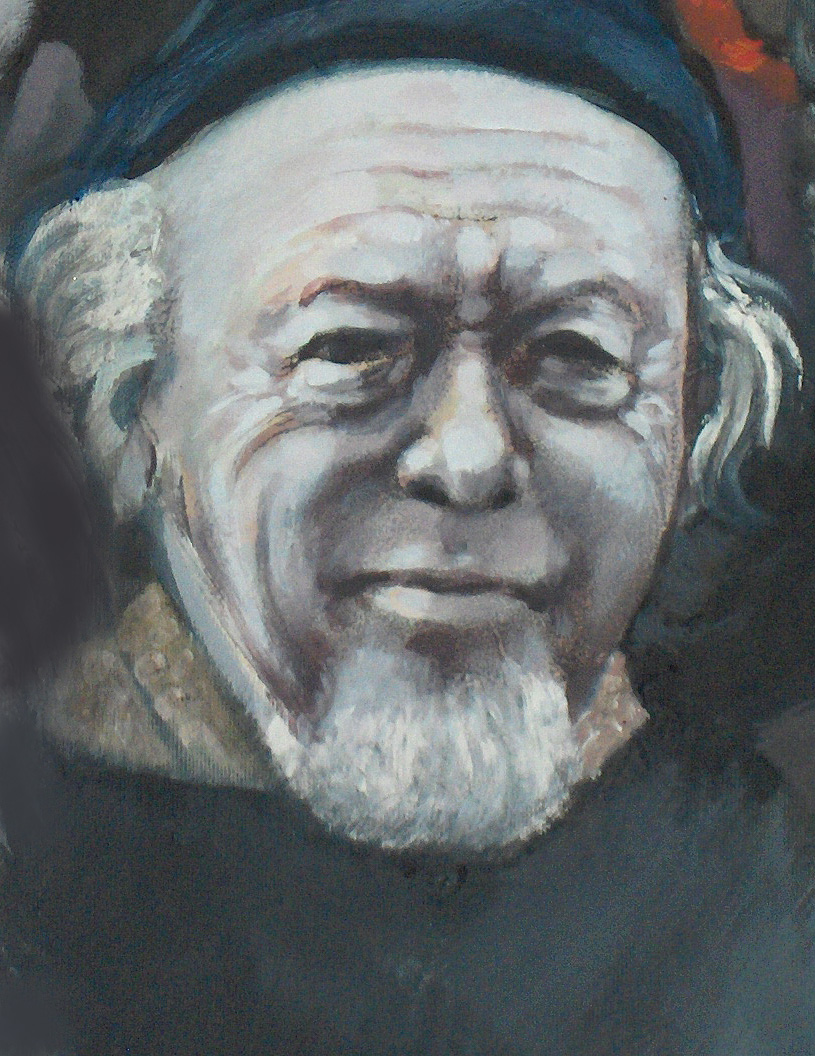
Jean Milo Portrait

Jean Milo was the pseudonym of Belgian author and artist Émile Van Gindertael. He was born in Saint-Josse-ten-Noode during 1906 and died in 1993 at Rixensart. He was also a painter, poet, essayist and novelist.

== Biography ==
From 1926 to 1931, Jean Milo was the director of the Belgian Gallery Le Centaure. As a painter, he was influential over Edgard Tytgat who wrote a biography about him. He helped found the Art abstrait group in 1952. Then, in 1980, he created a series of photo-collages which are now held by the Verbeke Foundation in Belgium.

== Works ==
- 1938 : L'Étang de Malbourg
- 1944 : L'Esprit de famille, Prix des Deux Magots
- 1956 : Le Marteau

== Major exhibitions ==
- 1986: A Retrospective exhibit in the Royal Museums of Fine Arts of Belgium
