= Une adolescence en Gueldre =

2005 novel by Jean-Claude Pirotte

- Author: Jean-Claude Pirotte
- Language: French
- Subject: Adolescence
- Set in: Gelderland
- Published: 22 August 2005
- Publisher: Éditions de la Table ronde
- Publication place: Belgium
- Pages: 206
- Awards: Prix des Deux Magots (2006); Prix Marcel Aymé (2006)
- ISBN: 9782710364924
- Website: Une adolescence en Gueldre

Une adolescence en Gueldre (An Adolescence in Gelderland) is a 2005 Belgian novel by Jean-Claude Pirotte that won the Prix des Deux Magots in 2006.

== Publication ==
Une adolescence en Gueldre is part of a series of books that Pirotte has published over a period of twenty years, in which his hero tells of his wanderings and experiences. The novel was published on 22 August 2005 by Éditions de la Table ronde. Jean-Claude Pirotte has published about thirty books. Many of them have won literary prizes, including the Prix Coppée, Prix Littéraire Valery Larbaud, Prix Vialatte and Prix Marguerite Duras.

== Synopsis ==
In his diary Ange Vincent tells of his life as an adolescent with the Prins family in the Veluwe, Holland. The father of the family, a great lover of literature, gives him the task of translating Don Quixote. He also accompanies the two sons of the family on their wanderings. They are both much older than the narrator, who is twelve and is starting to become aware of girls, including the naive Germaine, the provocative Mara and the languid Carlijn. The two boys, Han and Jan, are fascinated by the same woman. She has a strange resemblance to a portrait of Saint Mary Magdalene, thought to be painted by an unknown 16th century Flemish artist. The narrator must not make eye contact with the woman, who may be a saint or a prostitute. The ambiguous portrait comes to dominate the narrative. The narrator recalls his troubled relationship with his mother and the inability to "engage with life" that has made him a wanderer.

== Reception ==
Une adolescence en Gueldre received the 73rd Prix des Deux Magots on 31 January 2006. Pirotte also received the Prix Marcel Aymé for the novel, awarded on 15 December 2006, which came with a check for €3,000. This prize is given by the Association du livre et des auteurs comtois (ALAC), supported by the regional council of Franche-Comté and by the town and academy of Besançon.
