= J. M. Aimot =

Jean-Marie Aimot (1901–1968) was a French novelist, critic, biographer and translator who was active in the middle third of the 20th century. His books include Nos mitrailleuses n'ont pas tiré which won the Prix des Deux Magots in 1941 and La Carrière de Raoul Champfrond, a novel which won the Prix Balzac in 1944. He wrote biographies of Mané-Katz and Henry Morton Stanley.

A member of the collaborationist French Popular Party, Aimot was associated with the extreme right/fascist wing of French politics. He served as director of the French Documentary Film Service under the Vichy government.

== Selected works ==
- Lilian Harvey (1932)
- Mané-Katz (1933)
- Nos mitrailleuses n'ont pas tiré: journal d'une section de D.A.T. (1941)
- La Carriere de Raoul Champfrond: roman (1944)
- Stanley, le dernier conquistador (1951)
- Drieu la Rochelle: témoignages et documents (1958)
