= Paule Malardot =

French journalist and novelist

Joséphine Léontine Paule Gilberte Malardot (7 October 1898 – 26 February 1989) was a 20th-century French journalist and novelist, winner of the Prix des Deux Magots in 1947.

Born in Dijon, Malardot was a journalist in prewar women's magazines and at the L'Aurore from 1946. She also carried out translations of stories and novels (especially from Italian).

She was married to journalist and writer Marcel Sauvage, with whom she had a son. She died in Marly-le-Roi, Yvelines.

== Work (selection) ==
- 1935: Les prédictions de Madame Frayat pour 1936
- 1947: L'Amour aux deux visages, éditions SPLE, Prix des Deux Magots
- 1955: La Maison, vie domestique, éditions Clartés
- 1978: L'Orgueil des Kennelly, éditions Mondiales
