= Inès Cagnati =

Italian-French novelist

- Born: 21 February 1937; Monclar-d'Agénais, Lot-et-Garonne, France
- Died: 9 October 2007 (aged 70); Orsay, Essonne, France
- Occupations: Writer, teacher, translator
- Known for: French novelist

Inès Cagnati (21 February 1937 – 9 October 2007) was an Italian-French novelist living in rural France. Her novels treat of the experience of being an outsider, of growing up poor in rural France, and of the silence that accompanies the inability to communicate. She was also a French literature teacher at the Lycée Carnot in Paris.

== Family ==
Inès Cagnati was born in Monclar-d'Agénais, Lot-et-Garonne. Her parents were Italian agricultural workers, both from Northern Italy—her father from Treviso, and her mother from Vicenza—who, like more than eighty-thousand Italian workers and farmhands did in the 1930s, moved to the southwestern Lot-et-Garonne and Aquitaine regions in France for the prospect of a richer life.

"Illiterate for the most part and unable to speak French," writes Liesl Schillinger, "many of these economic refugees found work on marshy, rocky farmland that had been abandoned by Frenchmen who had fallen in the Great War or who had moved to the city." This is the landscape that Cagnati describes in her first book, Le Jour de Congé: "In the bleached-out soil at our place, the only thing that grows is stones. Others harvest their crops, we gather our stones. [...] Everything dies in our blanched land."

Cagnati had four sisters: Elsa, Gilda, Annie and Anabel, to whom she dedicated her first book, Le Jour de Congé (1973). Given the common occurrence of miscarriages at the time that happened at the time, and the amount of miscarriages that Galla, the protagonist of Cagnati's first novel Le Jour de Congé, witnesses, it's possible that Cagnati and her sisters had other siblings that died unborn, or in infancy.

== Life and writing ==
Cagnati's mother tongue was Italian. She was taught French when she started attending grade school. She did not consider herself French, and was naturalized into citizenship after birth. She describes the experience gaining citizenship as a tragedy. "Because clearly I wasn't French," she said, in a rare televised interview in 1989. "And then I wasn't Italian anymore, either. So I was nothing." She considered herself to be an étrangère, an outsider, all her life.

Cagnati described her childhood as unhappy. In that same 1989 interview, the journalist asks her if her unhappiness as a child was due to her isolation, her sense of separation from those around her, and the impossibility of communicating. She shrugs: "Maybe I just had a bad experience. I don't know. [As a child] you're all alone, you can't understand a thing. People expect all these things from you that you don't understand—especially when you don't speak the language."

This was especially true of Cagnati's experience in school, when she was learning French. She attributed her exclusion from the other children to her foreignness and inability to learn the language, as well as an immediately noticed and acutely felt class difference with the other students. "I understood nothing anyone told me," Cagnati said in a 1984 interview in the regional paper Sud-Ouest Dimanche, as related by translator Liesl Schillinger.

"I couldn't even obey, I didn't know what they wanted. [...] [The schoolchildren's] world was hostile, aggressive, they didn't want us there. I didn't understand their language or their rules, or what I was supposed to do in order to be tolerated, or at least to be pardoned for being myself, different," she said. "I think it was the same for the others." She added, "I think we were rejected more because we were poor than because we were Italian."

"A l’école, le monde a basculé. Je ne comprenais rien à ce que l’on me disait, je ne pouvais même pas obéir, je ne savais pas ce qu’on me voulait. Les Français n’avaient plus rien de fascinant. Leur monde était hostile, agressif, il ne nous voulaient pas; je ne comprenais ni son langage ni ses lois et ni ce que je devais faire non pour être tolérée, mais au moins pour être pardonnée d’être moi, différente..." "...Les autres enfants manifestaient aussi leur aversion, par la dérision, les injures, les poursuites. Mais nous nous battîmes bien sûr... je me souviens...de magnifiques batailles rangées dans la cour de l’école. Françaises contre étrangères, aussi enragées les unes que les autres, et toutes maniant glorieusement les insultes dont nous disposions."

Cagnati attended high school and continued her post-secondary studies in literature. She obtained a license (Bachelor's degree) and passed the CAPES exam to become a high school teacher. She began teaching at the Lycée Carnot, a prestigious high-school in Paris, in 1970, worked on her manuscripts while employed there, and published her first novel, Le Jour de Congé, in 1973, when she was 36 years old. She published her second novel just three years later.

It appears that she lived in Brasília for a short time, according to an article by Le Monde when she won the Prix des Deux Magots for her second novel, Génie la folle, in 1977, and that she was married, briefly, to an engineer. Dr. Joanna Scutts writes. "Two years later, when her third book was published, Cagnati was back in France, photographed for Paris Match in her country home, playing, reading, and roasting chestnuts with her young son; her husband is present in one picture, leaning out of their tight circle. In the 1989 interview, Cagnati does not mention him, describing her son as her only true family."

== Works ==
- Le Jour de congé, 1973 – Prix Roger-Nimier, translated in English as Free Day, by Liesl Schillinger (NYRB Classics, 2019).
- Génie la folle, 1976 – Prix des Deux Magots, translated in English as Crazy Genie, by Liesl Schillinger (NYRB Classics, 2026).
- Mosé ou le Lézard qui pleurait, 1979.
- Les Pipistrelles, 1989 – Prix de la Nouvelle de l'Académie française, 1990.
