= Alain Chedanne =

Alain Chedanne (1942–2010) was a French writer and professional squatter. He is known for two books, Shit, Man! (1971) and Un Freak (1974), both published by Gallimard. Shit, Man! is regarded as a French 'Beat' novel, and won the Prix des Deux Magots in 1972. Chedanne emerged as a writer in the aftermath of the May 1968 protests in France.

== See also ==
- Vagabond
