= Yves Malartic =

French writer (1910–1986)

Yves Malartic (1910–1986) was a French writer. He won the Prix des Deux Magots in 1948 for his novel Au Pays du Bon Dieu. He also wrote a biography of Tenzing Norgay in 1954 and was one of the translators of works by the American writer Chester Himes.

== Bibliography ==
- Henri van Hoof (1991). Histoire de la traduction en Occident: France, Grande-Bretagne, Allemagne, Russie, Pays-Bas [History of translation in the West: France, Great Britain, Germany, Russia, Netherlands] (in French). Duculot. ISBN 9782801109625 – via Google Books.
