= Pauline Dreyfus =

French woman of letters

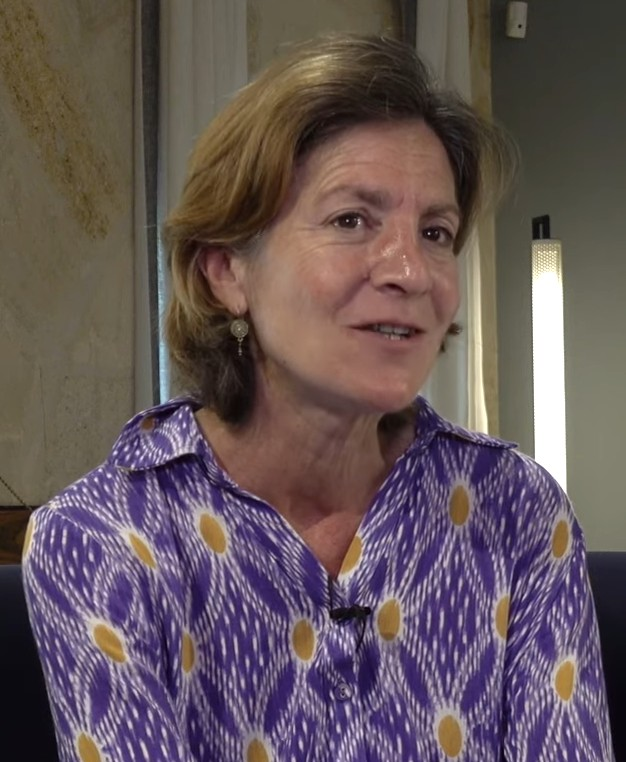

Pauline Dreyfus (19 November 1969) is a French woman of letters, winner of the prix des Deux Magots in January 2013 for her novel Immortel, enfin. That was the first time the prize was awarded unanimously by the jury.

== Works ==
- Le père et l'enfant se portent bien. Paris: Éditions JC Lattès. 2003. p. 163. ISBN 2-7096-2395-1.
- Robert Badinter, l'épreuve de la justice. Boulogne-Billancourt, France: Les Éditions du Toucan. 2009. p. 364. ISBN 978-2-8100-0312-9.
- Immortel, enfin. Paris: Éditions Grasset et Fasquelle. 2012. ISBN 978-2-246-78925-3. - prix des Deux Magots, 2013.
- Ce sont des choses qui arrivent, Paris, Éditions Grasset et Fasquelle, 2014 ISBN 978-2-246-85260-5 - prix Mémoire Albert Cohen 2015.
- Le déjeuner des barricades. Paris: Éditions Grasset et Fasquelle. 2017. p. 232. ISBN 978-2-246-81347-7.
