= Bernard G. Landry =

Bernard G. Landry (1926 – 4 April 2014) was a French writer and screenwriter, one of the founders of the French publishing house Le Temps des cerises

== Works ==
- 1952: Marcel Carné, sa vie, ses films, Jacques Vautrain
- 1960: Aide-mémoire pour Cécile, Éditions Denoël
- 1961: Le Jardin d'Olivier, Denoël
- 1963: L'Attente de quoi, Denoël
- 1992: Le Dernier écrivain, Le Temps des cerises
- 1996: L'Île Molle, Le Temps des cerises
- 1996: Que vive la Sécu !, with Jean-Michel Leterrier and Rolande Trempé, Le Temps des cerises
- 2001: Judas et Marie-Madeleine : correspondance intime, Le Temps des cerises

== Prizes ==
- Prix des Deux Magots 1960 for Aide-mémoire pour Cécile

== Filmography (selection) ==
- 1971: Chronique d'un couple by Roger Coggio
- 1975: Les Noces de porcelaine by Roger Coggio
