= Jean Masarès =

Jean Masarès was a French writer and film critic, laureate of the 1951 prix des Deux Magots.

== Biography ==
During the Second World War, Jean Masarès was a military nurse, notably in an insane asylum, which inspired him in the late 1940s with accounts of his experience in academic articles and symposia.

== Works ==
- 1950: Comme le pélican du désert, éditions Julliard — prix des Deux Magots 1951
- 1953: L'Inutile, éditions Julliard
