= Château de Carrouges =

Château in Orne, Normandy, France

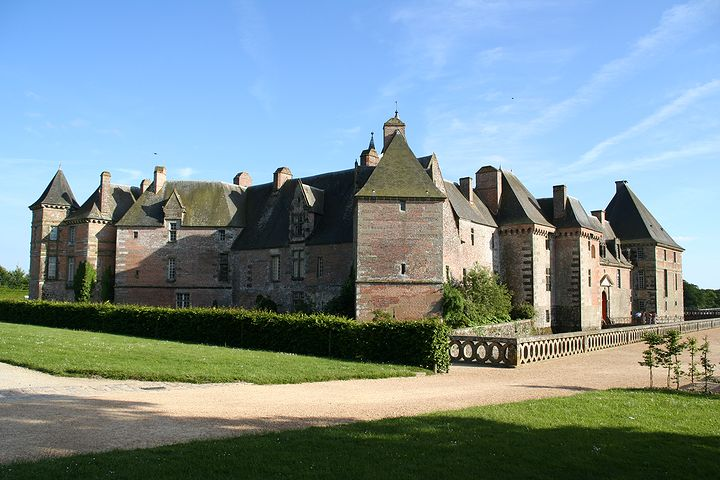
- Château de Carrouges

- Location within France

General information
- Type: Château
- Architectural style: French Renaissance
- Location: Carrouges, Orne, Normandy
- Coordinates: 48.5601°N 0.1544°W
- Construction started: 14th century
- Completed: 18th century
- Owner: Centre des monuments nationaux

Website
- https://www.chateau-carrouges.fr/en/

The Château de Carrouges is a château, dating partly from the 14th century, located in the commune of Carrouges, in the Orne department, Normandy, northern France. It is unusual in its combination of an austere fortress with a comfortable residence. The original fortifications at Carrouges were besieged and destroyed by English forces during the Hundred Years War. After the war, the château was rebuilt by Jean Blosset, grand seneschal of Normandy, in the 15th century.

In the 16th century, the family of Le Veneur de Tillières came into possession of the château. It was extended several times until the 17th century, with notable additions including a gatehouse, the western bastion, and the grand apartments. The interior was remodelled in the 18th century, when the music room was built. The last Le Veneur sold the château to the French state, and from 1944 it was restored. It is now managed by the Centre des monuments nationaux and is open to the public.

== History ==
Originally an oppidum, or defensive hill town, located at the southernmost border of the Norman duchy of William the Conqueror, Carrouges was vainly besieged by the Plantagenets in 1136. It was destroyed by the English in 1367, at the beginning of the Hundred Years War. Jean de Carrouges a vassal of Pierre II, Count of Alençon, became famous as one of the combatants in the last judicial duel to be permitted in France, in 1386. Following his victory, he was appointed a knight of honor to Charles VI.

The heiress of Jean de Carrouges married Guillaume Blosset, and their son Jean Blosset was appointed grand seneschal of Normandy. He made advantageous marriages with two wealthy heiresses from Brittany, first, Marguerite de Derval, and second, Francoise of Chastel, vicomtesse de Dinan et de La Bellière. These alliances gave Blosset the means of restoring and expanding the château, which had suffered great damage following its confiscation by Henry VI of England after the battle of Verneuil in 1424. Blosset built the north-eastern wing of the château, in which King Louis XI lodged on 11 August 1473.

=== Le Veneur de Tillières ===
Blosset died without heir, and the château passed to his nephew Jean Le Veneur, Bishop of Lisieux, who became a Cardinal in 1533, and who constructed the Renaissance châtelet, known as the pavillon du cardinal Jean Le Veneur. At the time of the French Wars of Religion (1562–98), the château was again strengthened, with the construction of the western bastion, but during the following century the sumptuous grand apartments were built. In the 17th century, Tanneguy II Le Veneur, comte de Tillières (d.1652), was dispatched to England to negotiate the marriage of Henrietta Maria of France, sister of Louis XIII, to the future King Charles I. Tanneguy II lived on his estates at Tillières and left Carrouges to his brother Jacques, abbot of Silly. In 1637, Jacques Le Veneur resigned his abbacy to devote himself entirely to Carrouges. He decorated the chateau and the park, starting from plans and drawings prepared by Maurice Gabriel, an architect from Argentan.

At the end of the 18th century, Alexis Le Veneur, vicomte de Tillières (1746–1833), a soldier and progressive, was one of the supporters of the philosopher Jean-Jacques Rousseau. He was elected mayor of Carrouges and administrator of the Orne department, then first president of the Conseil général de l'Orne, and finally represented Orne in the Corps législatif. He was made a Count of the Empire by Napoleon Bonaparte. In total, the château remained in the La Veneur family for five centuries, until 23 April 1936, on which date Marie Gaston Tanneguy IX, comte Le Veneur de Tillières, sold the château into state ownership, for F200,000. It has been classed as a monument historique since 1927, and is now in the care of the Centre des monuments nationaux.

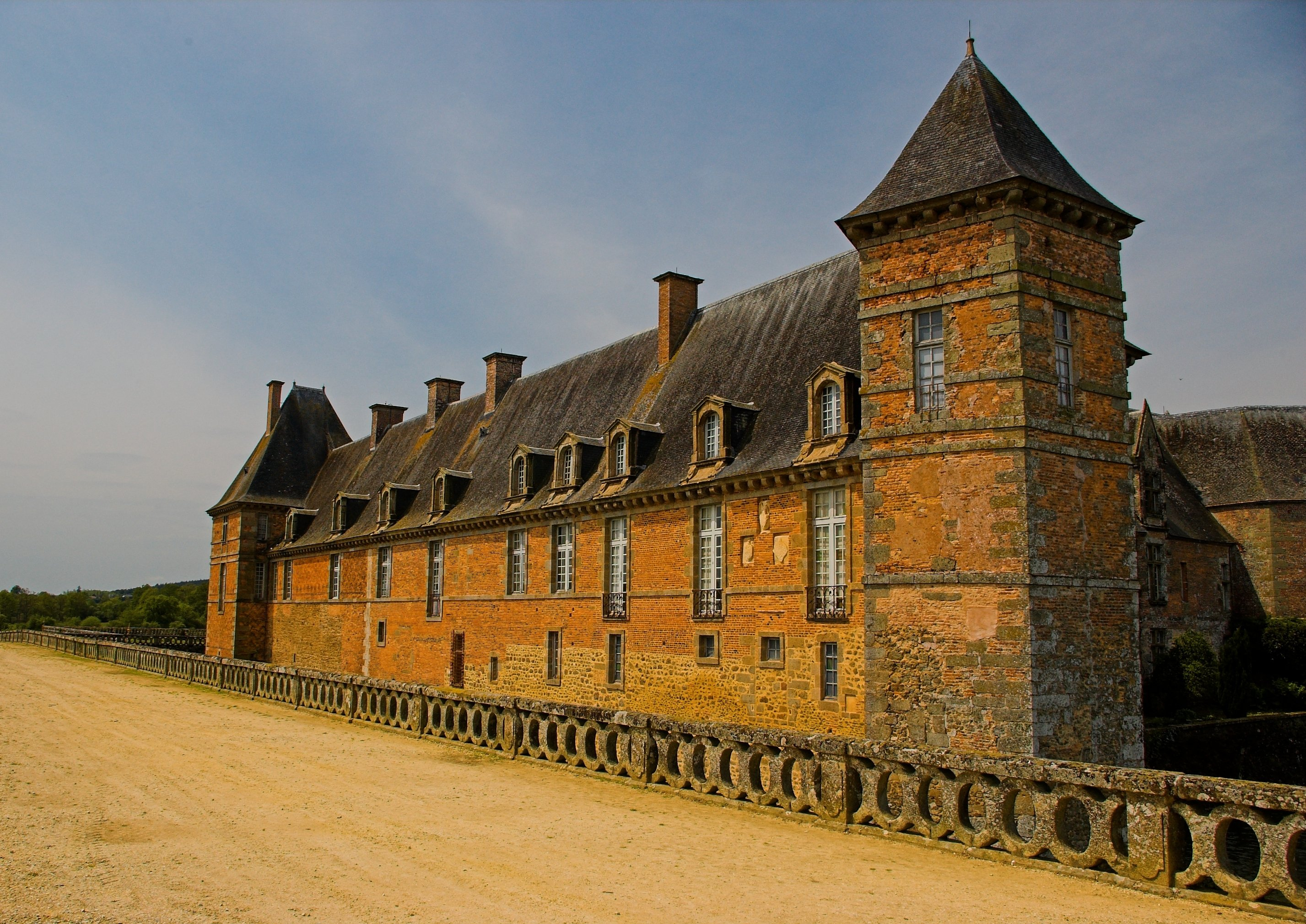
Château de Carrouges

== Architecture ==
The Château de Carrouges is rectangular in plan, surrounded by a moat. The central courtyard opens on to a terrace to the south-west. Although elements survive from the 15th and 16th centuries, the majority of the architecture is in the Henri IV and Louis XIII styles. The frontage is constructed of red brick and granite, the roofs are of blue slates. The château also has a keep of the 14th century, two storeys high and topped by machicolations.

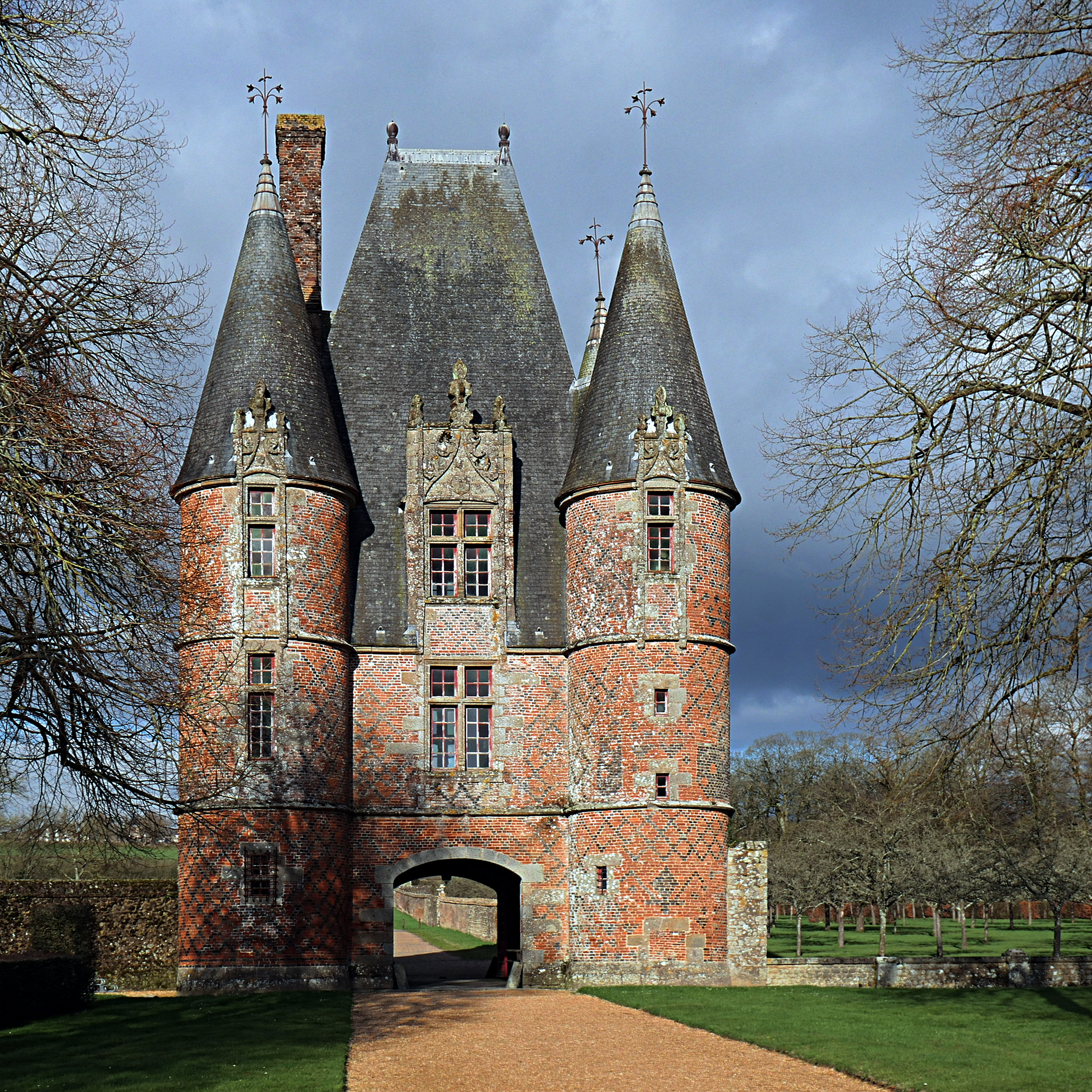
The entrance Châtelet (16th century), seen from inside the property

The 16th century châtelet, or gatehouse, comprises four circular turrets, and was probably built by Jean Le Veneur. It is constructed of red and black bricks.

=== Interiors ===
The ground floor of the east wing contains the service areas, while the first floor contains the state apartments. The apartments are decorated in Renaissance and traditional styles. The "Louis XI room" contains a bed with fabric imitating Hungarian point stitch. The chimney breast in the antichambre d'honneur is decorated with a hunting scene. The dining room is furnished with a granite chimney piece, with Corinthian capitals. Furniture is of the Louis XIV and Restoration styles. The Salon des Portraits contains portraits of the lords and owners of Carrouges. The Grand Salon occupies one corner of the building, the straw-coloured woodwork dates from the end of the 17th and the beginning of the 18th century. The main staircase, with its pink brick vaults, rests on four piles laid out in a square.

=== Gardens ===
The park and gardens extend to 10 hectares (25 acres), and are undergoing restoration.

== See also ==
- List of castles in France
