= Prix des Deux Magots =

French literary award

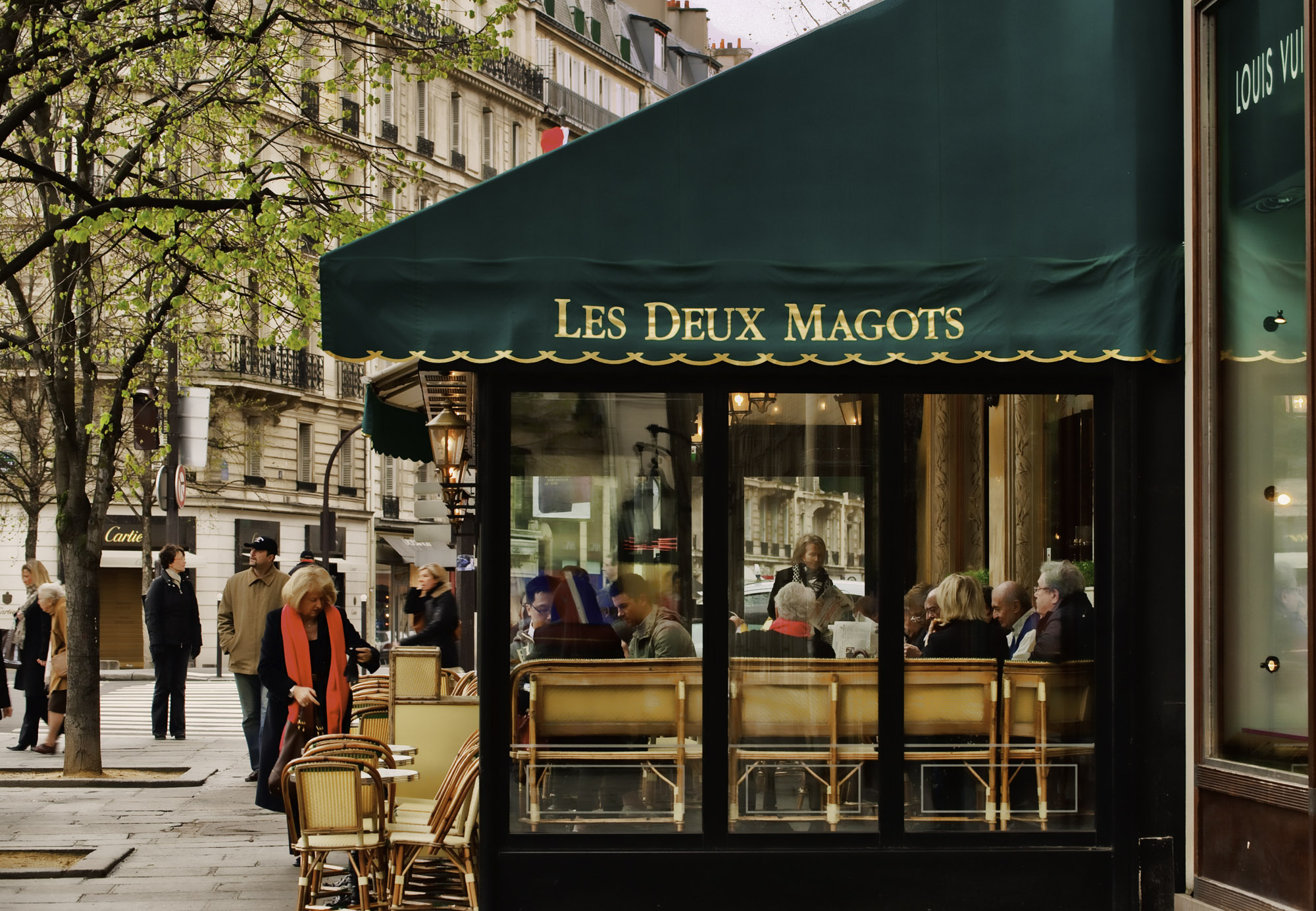
Les Deux Magots.

The Prix des Deux Magots (French pronunciation: [pʁi de dø maɡo]) is a major French literary prize. It is presented to new works, and is generally awarded to works that are more off-beat and less conventional than those that receive the more mainstream Prix Goncourt.

The name derives from the extant Parisian café "Les Deux Magots", which began as a drapery store in 1813, taking its name from a popular play of the time, The Two Magots (a magot is a type of Chinese figurine). It housed a wine merchant in the 19th century, and was refurbished in 1914 into a café.

== Winners ==
- 1933: Raymond Queneau Le Chiendent
- 1934: Georges Ribemont-Dessaignes Monsieur Jean ou l'Amour absolu
- 1935: Jacques Baron Charbon de Mer
- 1936: Michel Matveev Étrange Famille
- 1937: Georges Pillement Plaisir d'Amour
- 1938: Pierre Jean Launay Léonie la Bienheureuse
- 1941: J. M. Aimot Nos mitrailleuses n'ont pas tiré
- 1942: Olivier Séchan Les Corps ont soif
- 1944: Jean Milo L'Esprit de famille
- 1946: Jean Loubes Le Regret de Paris
- 1947: Paule Malardot L'Amour aux deux visages
- 1948: Yves Malartic Au Pays du Bon Dieu
- 1949: Christian Coffinet Autour de Chérubine
- 1950: Antoine Blondin L'Europe buissonnière
- 1951: Jean Masarès Le Pélican dans le désert
- 1952: René-Jean Clot Le Poil de la Bête
- 1953: Albert Simonin Touchez pas au grisbi
- 1954: Claude Cariguel S
- 1955: Pauline Réage Histoire d'O
- 1956: René Hardy Amère Victoire
- 1957: Willy de Spens Grain de Beauté
- 1958: Michel Cournot Le Premier Spectateur
- 1959: Henri-François Rey La Fête Espagnole
- 1960: Bernard-G. Landry Aide-mémoire pour Cécile
- 1961: Bernard Jourdan Saint-Picoussin
- 1962: Loys Masson Le notaire des noirs
- 1963: Jean Gilbert L'Enfant et le Harnais
- 1964: Clément Lépidis La Rose de Büyükada
- 1965: Fernand Pouillon Les Pierres sauvages
- 1966: Michel Bataille Une Pyramide sur la mer
- 1967: Solange Fasquelle L'Air de Venise
- 1968: Guy Sajer Le soldat oublié
- 1969: Elvire de Brissac A Pleur-Joie
- 1970: Roland Topor Joko fête son anniversaire
- 1971: Bernard Frank Un siècle débordé
- 1972: Alain Chedanne Shit, Man
- 1973: Michel del Castillo Le Vent de la nuit
- 1974: André Hardellet Les Chasseurs Deux
- 1975: Geneviève Dormann Le Bateau du courrier
- 1976: François Coupry Mille pattes sans tête
- 1977: Inès Cagnati Génie la folle
- 1978: Sébastien Japrisot L'Eté meurtrier
- 1979: Catherine Rihoit Le bal des débutantes
- 1980: Roger Garaudy L'appel des vivants
- 1981: Raymond Abellio Sol Invictus
- 1982: François Weyergans Macaire le Copte
- 1983: Michel Haas La dernière mise à mort
- 1984: Jean Vautrin Patchwork
- 1985: Arthur Silent Mémoires minuscules
- 1986: Éric Deschodt Eugénie les larmes aux yeux and Michel Breitman Témoin de poussière
- 1987: Gilles Lapouge La bataille de Wagram
- 1988: Henri Anger La mille et unième rue
- 1989: Marc Lambron L'impromptu de Madrid
- 1990: Olivier Frébourg, Roger Nimier
- 1991: Jean-Jacques Pauvert, Sade
- 1992: Bruno Racine, Au péril de la mer
- 1993: Christian Bobin, Le Très-Bas
- 1994: Christophe Bataille, Annam
- 1995: Pierre Charras, Monsieur Henry
- 1996: Éric Neuhoff, Barbe à Papa
- 1997: Ève de Castro, Nous serons comme des Dieux
- 1998: Daniel Rondeau, Alexandrie and Éric Faye Je suis le gardien du phare
- 1999: Marc Dugain, La Chambre des officiers
- 2000: Philippe Hermann, La vraie joie
- 2001: François Bizot, Le Portail
- 2002: Jean-Luc Coatalem, Je suis dans les mers du Sud
- 2003: Michka Assayas, Exhibition
- 2004: Adrien Goetz, La Dormeuse de Naples
- 2005: Gérard Oberlé, Retour à Zornhof
- 2006: Jean-Claude Pirotte, Une adolescence en Gueldre
- 2007: Stéphane Audeguy, Fils unique
- 2008: Dominique Barbéris, Quelque chose à cacher
- 2009: Bruno de Cessole, L'heure de la fermeture dans les jardins d'Occident
- 2010: Bernard Chapuis, Le Rêve entouré d'eau
- 2011: Anthony Palou, Fruits & légumes
- 2012: Michel Crépu, Le Souvenir du monde
- 2013: Pauline Dreyfus, Immortel, enfin
- 2014: Étienne de Montety, La Route du salut
- 2015: Serge Joncour, L'Écrivain national
- 2016: Pierre Adrian, La Piste Pasolini
- 2017: Kéthévane Davrichewy, L'Autre Joseph
- 2018: Julie Wolkenstein, Les vacances
- 2019: Emmanuel de Waresquiel, Le Temps de s'en apercevoir
- 2020: Jérôme Garcin, Le Dernier Hiver du Cid
- 2021: Emmanuel Ruben, Sabre
- 2022: Louis-Henri de La Rochefoucauld, Châteaux de Sable
- 2023: Guy Boley, À ma sœur et unique
- 2024: Jean-Pierre Montal, La Face nord
- 2025: Joseph Incardona, Le monde est fatigué
