= Claude Cariguel =

French writer

Claude Cariguel (born 1931, Paris) is a French writer and novelist. His novel S was published in 1953 by Flammarion and received the Prix des Deux Magots the following year. Among his other books are Hollywood (1956), Les danseurs (1956), Les Enragés (1957), A comme Agathe (1964) and L'insolence (1967).
