= Christian Coffinet =

French journalist, novelist, and screenwriter (1923–2011)

- Born: Christian Rene Marcel Coffinet; 12 July 1923; Paris, France
- Died: 18 May 2011 (aged 87); Dreux, Centre-Val de Loire, France
- Occupations: Journalist; novelist; screenwriter
- Writing career
- Notable awards: Prix des Deux Magots (1949)

Christian Rene Marcel Coffinet (12 July 1923 – 18 May 2011) was a French journalist, novelist, and screenwriter. He was the winner of the prix des Deux Magots in 1949.

Christian Coffinet adapted some of his novels for cinema, particularly La Fille de proie for the film La Moucharde (1958) by Guy Lefranc.

Coffinet was born in Paris on 12 July 1923. He died in Dreux on 18 May 2011, at the age of 87.

== Works ==
- 1948: Les Voyous, éditions du Pavois
- 1948: Autour de Chérubine, éditions Fournier-Valdè — prix des Deux Magots 1949
- 1949: Le Quatrième Commandement, éditions Fournier-Valdès
- 1949: Merveilleuse, éditions du Pavois
- 1949: Sale Coin, éditions Fournier-Valdès
- 1953: La Fille de proie, Éditions du Scorpion
- 1955: Les Jeux de mains, éditions du Scorpion
- 1955: Les Propositions malhonnêtes, éditions du Scorpion
- 1956: La Poudre aux yeux, éditions du Scorpion
- 1974: Le Détonateur, Fayard
- 1976: La Danse du cobaye, éditions Jean-Claude Lattès
- 1977: Qui se sent bien en Malaisie ?, éditions Jean-Claude Lattès
- 1977: La Jambe de mon père, éditions Jean-Claude Lattès
