= Clément Lépidis =

French novelist

Clément Lépidis (1920–1997) was a French novelist of Greek descent. He was born Kleanthis Tsélébidis (Greek: Κλεάνθης Τσελεμπίδης) into a Greek Orthodox family that had settled in Paris.

Lépidis spent his childhood and adolescence in the Parisian neighbourhood of Belleville. His father, like many Greek and Armenian refugees, worked in the shoe trade. Clément too tried the shoe trade at one point working with brands, as he later related in his books, such as Ma vie en chantier, L'Arménien and La Main rouge. He tried several other careers, e.g., stockbroker's clerk, photographer, radio wireman, sales representative and cashier. His work experiences inspired the book The Tribulations of a Commercial Traveller. Afterwards, he devoted himself to painting and literature.

Among his friends were the photographer Robert Doisneau, the accordionist Jo Privat, whose biography he wrote, and the wrestler Tasso Miades. Lépidis loved his fellow Parisians. He described their happy and friendly character. He also wrote of the dark side of Paris during the German occupation when many Jews and Armenians, his friends and neighbours from Belleville, were rounded up. These he depicted in the novel The Armenian.

At his death in 1997, he left behind many works of literature, including poetry, short stories and novels. His work was rooted in both the Mediterranean and his own Belleville neighbourhood.

== Awards ==
- La Rose de Büyükada (1963) – winner of the Prix des Deux Magots
- Le Marin de Lesbos (1972) – winner of the Prix du roman populiste
- L'Arménien (1976) – winner of the Prix de l'Académie française and Prix de la Société des gens de lettres
