= Bernard Jourdan =

French writer (1918–2003)

- Born: 1 February 1918
- Died: 18 August 2003 (aged 85)
- Occupation: Writer
- Writing career
- Notable awards: Prix des Deux Magots (1961)

Bernard Jourdan (1 February 1918 – 18 August 2003) was a French writer. In 1961, his novel Saint-Picoussin published in 1960 by Fayard earned him the Prix des Deux Magots.

== Selected works ==
- 1957: La Graine au vent
- 1961: Saint-Picoussin
- 1963: Douleur d'airain
- 1988: Monologue de l'an
- 1992: Dix-sept élégies
- 1998: L'Hiver qui vient, poèmes
