= Peymeinade =

Commune in Provence-Alpes-Côte d'Azur, France

- Commune
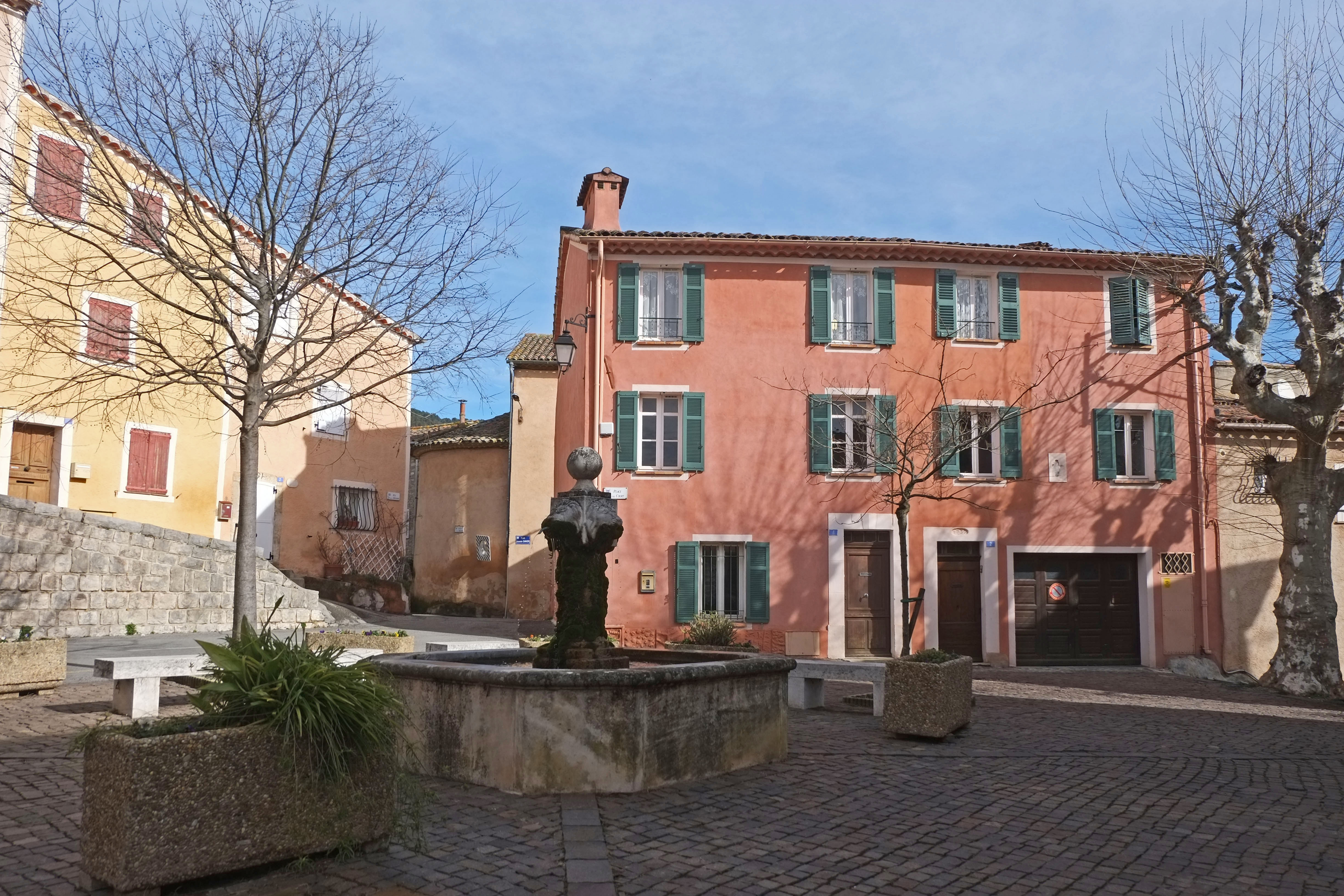
- The square of Gervais Court in Peymeinade

- Coat of arms
- Location of Peymeinade
- Location within France Location within Provence-Alpes-Côte d'Azur
- Coordinates: 43°38′35″N 6°52′36″E
- Country: France
- Region: Provence-Alpes-Côte d'Azur
- Department: Alpes-Maritimes
- Arrondissement: Grasse
- Canton: Grasse-1
- Intercommunality: CA Pays de Grasse

Government
  - Mayor (2026–32): Brigitte Vidal
- Area^{1}: 9.76 km^{2} (3.77 sq mi)
- Elevation: 212 m (696 ft)
- Highest elevation: 326 m (1,070 ft)
- Lowest elevation: 29 m (95 ft)
- Population (2023): 8,514
  - Density: 872/km^{2} (2,260/sq mi)
- Time zone: UTC+01:00 (CET)
  - Summer (DST): UTC+02:00 (CEST)
- INSEE/Postal code: 06095 /06530
- ^{1} French Land Register data, which excludes lakes, ponds, glaciers > 1 km^{2} (0.386 sq mi or 247 acres) and river estuaries.

Peymeinade (French pronunciation: [pɛmenad]; Occitan: Puegmeinada) is a commune in the Alpes-Maritimes department in southeastern France, situated in the hills behind Cannes.

To the north, Peymeinade borders Cabris and beyond it, both to the north, south and west, Peymeinade sits above the Parc naturel régional des Préalpes d'Azur. To its east, is Grasse, a town famed for being considered the world's capital of perfume.

The town is often considered quieter, lesser known, unspoilt and authentic, compared to a considerable number of other towns and villages set along and behind the French Riviera.

== Population ==
Historical population
Year	Pop.	±% p.a.
1968	1,765	—
1975	3,229	+9.01%
1982	4,479	+4.79%
1990	6,293	+4.34%
1999	7,120	+1.38%
2007	7,835	+1.20%
2012	7,949	+0.29%
2017	8,151	+0.50%
2023	8,514	+0.73%
Source: INSEE

== See also ==
- Communes of the Alpes-Maritimes department
