= Pierre Albert-Birot =

French poet, dramatist and theater manager

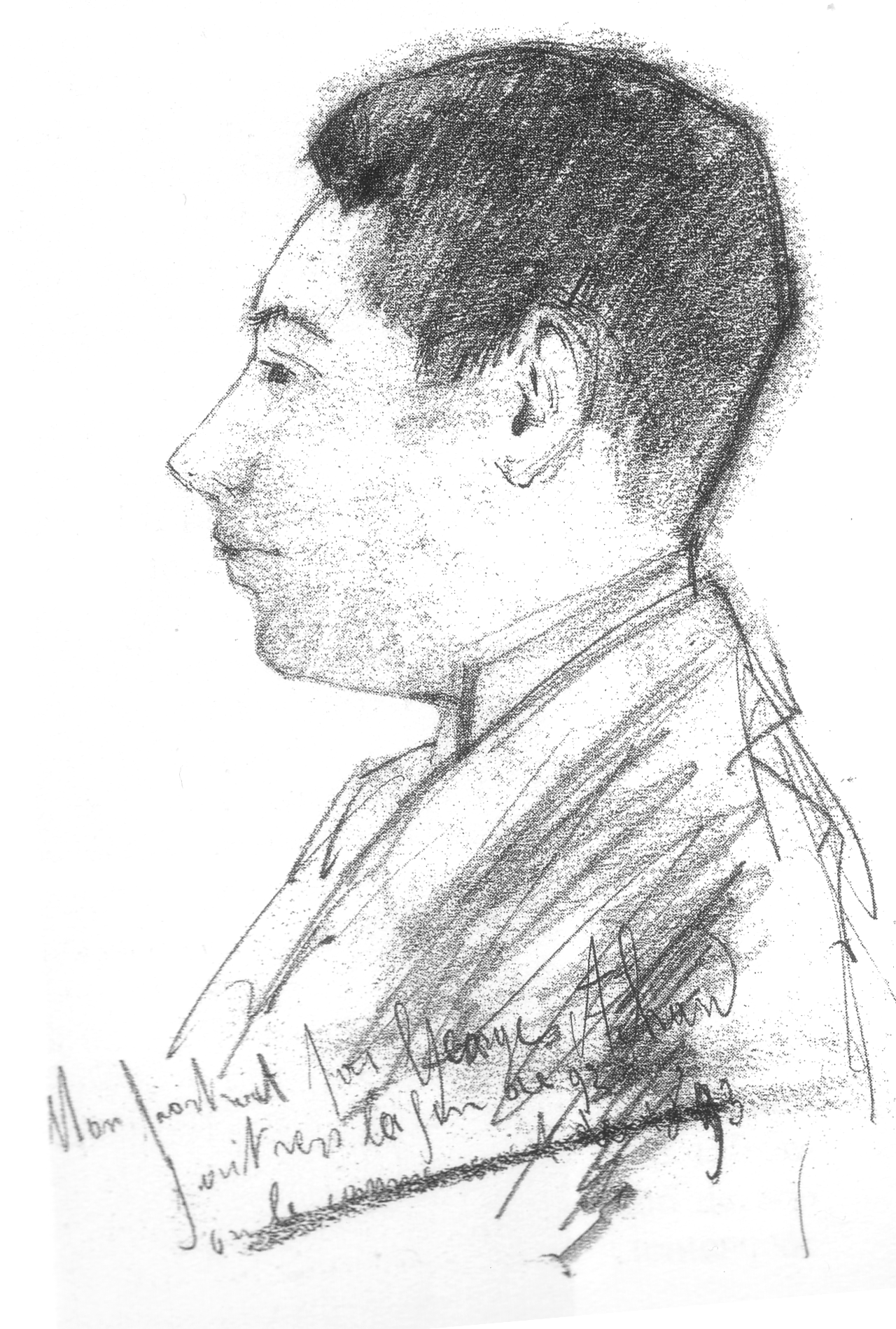
- Portrait by Georges Achard
- Born: 22 April 1876; Angoulême, France
- Died: 25 July 1967 (aged 91); Paris, France
- Known for: poet, dramatist, theater manager
- Movement: Modernism

Pierre Albert-Birot (French: [pjɛʁ albɛʁ biʁo]; 22 April 1876 – 25 July 1967) was a French avant-garde poet, dramatist, and theater manager. He was a steadfast avant-garde during World War I. He created and published the magazine Sic from 1916 to 1919. He was a defender of Futurism and Cubism. The Dadaists considered him one of their own, although he never took part in the movement. He declared himself the founder of the ″nunique" school (from the Greek adverb νῦν / nun, now), a literary school of which he was the only master, with no disciples.

After the war, he distanced himself from the Surrealists, to whom he had, with Guillaume Apollinaire, given their name, and he created a solipsistic body of work and tried his hand at everything, printing his own books and cultivating the childlike joy of artistic creation. He himself wrote: ″I find my joy in poetic creation and I find my joy in the creations of my hands. ... All of this is just like a game, I love to play, I keep the kid alive.″

Despite being mocked by the Surrealists for his pretensions to excel in many artistic mediums, and being criticized by Philippe Soupault as an extravagant man without real poetic talent, he earned the praises and friendships of Francis Picabia and Apollinaire, who dubbed him Pyrogène ("Pyrogen"), because of his "fiery" temperament as an innovator and disruptor. Later, Gaston Bachelard praised the depth of his philosophical views, thanking him for ″giving the body better consciousness than a philosopher″. He has been credited as influencing various poets such as Jean Follain, Pascal Pia, and Valérie Rouzeau.

== Childhood and adolescence ==
He was born Pierre Albert Birot on April 22, 1876, in Angoulême. His mother, Marguerite, ″embroidered, played the piano and sang.″ His father, Maurice Birot, ″was constantly starting up businesses, but not very solid ones.″ The family spent their summers not far from Angoulême, at the Château de Chalonnes. There, the young Albert-Birot, still in high school, set up a glove puppet theatre, wrote plays, and invited the village to performances.

After his father made some bad business deals, the family left the Château de Chalonnes and moved to Bordeaux. Pierre received private lessons in Greek, and gave his teacher ″an exceptional wooden cutout cigar case made by him using a pedal machine as big as a sewing machine.″ In the same year, his father left the household to live with a friend of his wife. Finding themselves without resources, Marguerite set up a boarding house. The house then welcomed young female dancers from the nearby theatre who came to live in the room next to Pierre's. However, the boarding house was not sufficient to cover the family's needs, so they moved to Paris at the end of 1892. There, Marguerite worked as a seamstress.

== Early years in Paris ==
In Paris, Albert Birot, barely sixteen years old, met the sculptor Georges Achard, who introduced him to the École des Beaux-Arts and introduced him to Falguière. Since he wanted to be a painter, Albert-Birot met with Gustave Moreau and Gérôme at this time. It is finally sculpture that captures his interest: he left the École des Beaux-Arts, worked on sculptures in Georges Achard's studio, and met Alfred Boucher. In the latter's studio, an Italian craftsman teaches him how to carve marble.

Having received financial support from the city of Angoulême through a scholarship, he set up his studio in a cabin on the boulevard du Montparnasse. At the same time, he took courses at the Sorbonne and the Collège de France, including the philosophy course of Alfred Espinas.

He set up house in 1896 with the sister of the painter Georges Bottini, Marguerite, with whom he has four children.

He exhibited at the Salon des Artistes Français for the first time in 1900. Seven years later, his sculpture The Widow was purchased by the state for the cemetery of Issy-les-Moulineaux, where it remains today. For food, he sculpted Parisian façades (some of which can be seen around the Champ-de-Mars and in Neuilly-sur-Seine). From 1900, he also worked as a restorer for antique dealer Madame Lelong, a job he kept all his life and which provided the material for his novel Rémy Floche, employé.

During the year 1912, he frequented Esperanto circles in Paris and wrote poems in Esperanto. It is perhaps there that he met the musician Germaine de Surville.

The same year, he abandoned his children. His daughters entered the Orphanage of the Arts in Courbevoie, and his sons entered the Fraternity of Artists. He married Germaine in 1913.

== SIC ==
From January 1916 to December 1919, Albert-Birot edited the avant-garde art magazine SIC: Sons Idées Couleurs, Formes, which featured writings by Futurists, Dadaists and Surrealists. SIC was the second Parisian magazine, after Nord-Sud, to distribute the texts of the Zürich Dadaists, namely those of Tristan Tzara. SIC was a focus for many avant-garde initiatives, even those which Albert-Birot himself disliked, but he believed in independence and objectivity. At the end of its publication in 1919, SIC had published 53 issues.

=== New Birth ===
Pierre Albert Birot avoided the draft due to respiratory insufficiency during World War I, and, according to his own words, "was really born" during the creation of the magazine SIC in 1916, when he definitively adopted his artist name, hyphenating his middle and last name. The title of the magazine, represented by a SIC carved into wood framed by two symmetrical F's, has two meanings; it is firstly the Latin word yes, standing for "a desire to constructively oppose the war that negates human values" and more generally, a desire "to assert oneself through a complete acceptance of the world,". It is also the acronym for its subheading "Sons Idées Couleurs, Formes," which was an expression of the multiple activities of the Albert-Birot couple – Sounds for Germaine's music, Ideas for poetry, Colors for painting, and Forms for Pierre's sculpture – but aspired to become the motto for a "synthesis of modernist arts."

Issue number 1, sold for twenty centimes, appeared in January 1916, entirely written and illustrated by Pierre Albert-Birot. The publication stood out for its modernism, despite coming from a painter and sculptor trained by traditionalist Achard, a self-taught "Adamite poet" who had not yet encountered the avant-garde. "Our desire: to act. To take initiatives, not to wait for them to come from across the Rhine," is the first of the "First Words" displayed by SIC; an affirmation of originality as a condition of Art, "Art begins where imitation ends " which is not without evoking, although in a much less radical form, Dada's rejection of all imitation and literary tradition and life. Earlier by one month, Albert-Birot is not far from synchronous with the vitalist affirmation of the Dadaists of no longer imitating life but creating life.

An illustration in the publication of the first issue shows the outstretched hand of an isolated artist to avant-garde circles of which he was both completely unknown and ignorant.

He mockingly calls Paul Claudel a ″beautiful poet of the day before yesterday″ and continues with ″I would really like to meet a poet of today″.

=== Meeting with avant-garde circles ===
The first to respond to this magazine was not a poet but the painter Gino Severini, whose impetus made SIC a true avant-garde magazine, as Albert-Birot humorously explains:

″Severini already had quite a few years of combat and research into ultra-modern art behind him, since he had been with Marinetti, the creator of Futurism, for a long time; naturally, for him, the first issue of my magazine was quite timid, but after talking to me he had the feeling that I was ready to become a true warrior for the good cause.″

The second issue, published in February, is devoted to the discovery of Futurism. It reports on Severini's First Exhibition of Plastic Art of the War and other previous works, held at the Boutet de Monvel gallery from January 15 to February 1, 1916. Albert-Birot writes: "The picture, until now a fraction of space, becomes with futurism a fraction of time." Severini offered SIC a reproduction of his Train Arriving in Paris.

In addition, Severini convinced Guillaume Apollinaire to meet Albert-Birot. The meeting takes place in July 1916, at an talian hospital, and immediately the two men became friends. Apollinaire introduced Albert-Birot to his many friends and brought his mentorship to the magazine. Apollinaire has his Tuesdays at the Café de Flore and SIC has its Saturdays, on rue de la Tombe-Issoire, where Apollinaire comes as soon as he is released from the hospital and brings his friends: André Salmon, Pierre Reverdy, Serge Férat, and Roch Grey.

== Collaboration with Apollinaire ==
From their first meeting, organized by Severini in July 1916 while Apollinaire was convalescing at the Italian hospital in Paris, Albert-Birot asked him to write a play that he would direct, with the idea of non-realistic theater as the guiding principle. Apollinaire proposed to subtitle it ″supernaturalist drama″; but Albert-Birot wanted to avoid any association with the naturalist school or the evocation of the supernatural, so they agreed on the word ″surrealist.″ The play, Les Mamelles de Tirésias, was created at the Maubel conservatory on June 24, 1917. The music was by Germaine Albert-Birot, the sets by the cubist painter Serge Férat, and the costumes by Irène Lagut. In the idea of abandoning referential realism, masks were used. Patrons are sold a program adorned with a drawing by Picasso and a woodcut by Matisse. The creation of the work takes place under uncertain conditions due to the context of the war. The budget is reduced and the scenery is made of paper. Thérèse's flying breasts were supposed to be represented by helium-filled balloons, but since the gas is reserved for the army, they settle for pressed fabric balls. The director also narrowly avoids a last-minute actor dropout, and without any musicians, Germaine's music cannot be played. Finally, a single pianist, who also handles sound effects, performs the music. The play, which is a sell-out at its performance, has a taste of a Dada evening: already, due to the passionate reactions, the show is as much on stage as it is in the audience. "Journalists [...] shout scandal. [...] The play ends in an indescribable uproar." Another incident occurs when Jacques Vaché, accompanied by Théodore Fraenkel, threatens the audience with a gun. Later, Albert-Birot will doubt the veracity of this anecdote. "The play attracts the wrath of the press, which unleashes itself against Apollinaire as well as against Albert-Birot. It also causes several cubists, including Juan Gris, to distance themselves from Apollinaire. On the other hand, young Louis Aragon, urged on by Albert-Birot, writes a glowing review in SIC.

The same year, Albert-Birot publishes his 31 Pocket Poems prefaced by Apollinaire. Unfortunately, Apollinaire dies the following year and the experience of Les Mamelles de Tirésias cannot be repeated.

In January of the following year, Albert-Birot dedicates a triple issue of SIC to the memory of Apollinaire, and brings together the funeral tributes of Roger Allard, Louis Aragon, André Billy, Blaise Cendrars, Jean Cocteau, Paul Dermée, Max Jacob, Irène Lagut, Pierre Reverdy, Jules Romains, André Salmon, Tristan Tzara, etc.

== ″The time of solitude″ ==
″ [...] with the 30s and after the theater experiments, begins what Albert-Birot calls his time of solitude.″ – Jean Follain

Germaine Albert-Birot died in 1931, and the poet of light was forced to don the clothes of mourning. He wrote and printed without an author's name thirty copies of a collection of funeral poems that he dedicated to himself: "My Dead, a sentimental poem." Four "G"s, as a coat of arms, adorned each page. According to the testimony of his friend Jean Follain (whom he met in 1933 and who remained one of his rare friends along with the painter Serge Férat, the novelist Roch Grey, and Roger Roussot), the widowed poet retired to a narrow dwelling on rue du Départ, refused literary fraternities, and printed his books, using his lever machine placed in his room, giving them the only advertisement of depositing them at the National Library. After My Dead in 1931 and six years of silence, we can cite The Cycle of Poems of the Year in 1937, the elegiac Âmenpeine in 1938, and The Black Panther, the same year. He spent much of his time listening to the radio with headphones on an old galena machine. In the evening, he dined alone, poorly.

However, at the same time, from 1933, Jean Follain started to gather Albert-Birot's old friends every fortnight for so-called Grabinoulor dinners, from the name of the epic whose writing would occupy all his life, and its eponymous character, the literary double of Albert-Birot. Grabinoulor is a vast project started in 1918, the year in which an excerpt was also published in the thirtieth issue of Sic. The Grabinoulor dinners, where one read pages of the epic, took place in a restaurant on rue des Canettes, and the books that Albert-Birot printed at this time bear the mention ″Editions des Canettes″.

In 1933, thanks to the recommendation of Jean Paulhan, Robert Denoël agreed to publish a first version of Grabinoulor, which is in two books (it will count six, once completed).

== Last rebirth and late life ==
A new life begins for Pierre Albert-Birot in 1955, when he meets Arlette Lafont, a Sorbonne student who wanted to collect his testimony on Roch Grey. She became his wife in 1962, and through her efforts, she helped to bring her husband's work out of obscurity. In 1956, he dedicated to her his collection of poems The Blue Train, written in 1953, with these words:

″For Arlette,

who gives me a kind of strange tranquility, a kind of certainty that I will not entirely get on the Blue Train. I will leave here a part of the best of myself″

The ″blue train″ is in Albert-Birot's personal mythology an allegory he had already used for death. The collection is mainly composed of verse poems, meditations on time, old age, and death, but always carried by the quirky humor of its author. Thus, Pascal Pia was able to say that ″Albert-Birot did not put a final point on anything. He was not inclined towards rupture. Struggles, however severe they were, did not bring him down, nor did they change his tone. The songs of his twilight have the same familiar turn as the poems of his beginnings.″ In 1965, thanks to Arlette's efforts, Gallimard published an augmented but incomplete Grabinoulor. A banner did not hesitate to present it as "a classic of Surrealism," to the surprise, and even anger, of Albert-Birot, who had never been part of the group, signed any manifesto, or participated in any of the demonstrations. In 1966, he declared that he was not "attracted to the arcana and the fantastic of Surrealism, to its Freudian visions." The play, to which the author put a final point in 1963—the only point in all of his work—is only published in its complete form of the Six Books of Grabinoulor in 1991 by Jean-Michel Place.

Pierre Albert-Birot died on July 27, 1967. On his death notice, Arlette included a verse from The Black Panther:

"Those who love you see you beautiful, vertical, all war and fire and colors, biting with full teeth, biting into the solar system."

== Poetry ==
Albert-Birot wrote several books of poetry, including:

- Trente et un Poèmes de Poche ("Thirty-one Pocket Poems"), 1917
- Poèmes quotidiens, ("Everyday Poems"), 1919
- La Triloterie, 1920
- Poèmes à l'autre moi ("Poems to the Other Me"), 1927
- Amenpeine, 1938
- La Clé des Champs
- La Panthere noire ("The Black Panther"), 1938
- Les Amusements naturels ("Natural Amusements"), 1945
- Cent dix gouttes de poésie ("110 drops of poetry", 1952
- Le Pont des Soupirs, Dix Sonnets Et Une Chanson, Isis, 1972

His poetry is inseparable from his early theatrical work: lyric, funny and eminently modern.

== Prose ==
His novel Grabinoulor appeared in 1919. Bernard Jourdan theorised that the name of the hero of this stream of consciousness is a near-anagram of "We Albert-Birot";

The titular Grabinoulour, a modern man, has a host of adventures, some everyday, others fantastic, with nods to the heroes of Rabelais' and Lewis Caroll's works, but also to the supermen of modern mythology; from Fantômas to Tarzan, from Arsène Lupin to science fiction heroes traveling through space and time.

Pierre Albert-Birot was a fringe poet who wrote fanciful novels such as the 1934 Rémy Floche, employé ("employee"). He also wrote literary translations of Homer, Aeschylus and Virgil, translations of medieval poets into Modern French, and studies of prosody.

== Theater ==
In 1917, Albert-Birot directed the first performance of Les mamelles de Tirésias by Guillaume Apollinaire, a friend who had also been a contributor to SIC. He went on to write numerous plays of his own, including Barbe-Bleue ("Bluebeard"); Les Femmes pliantes ("Flexible Women"); and L'homme coupé en morceaux ("The Dismembered Man").

In 1929 he founded his own theater, Le Plateau. Being unable to afford to produce others' works, he produced his own series of short performance pieces entitled Pièces-Études ("Study pieces").
