= Thomas B. Reverdy =

French writer

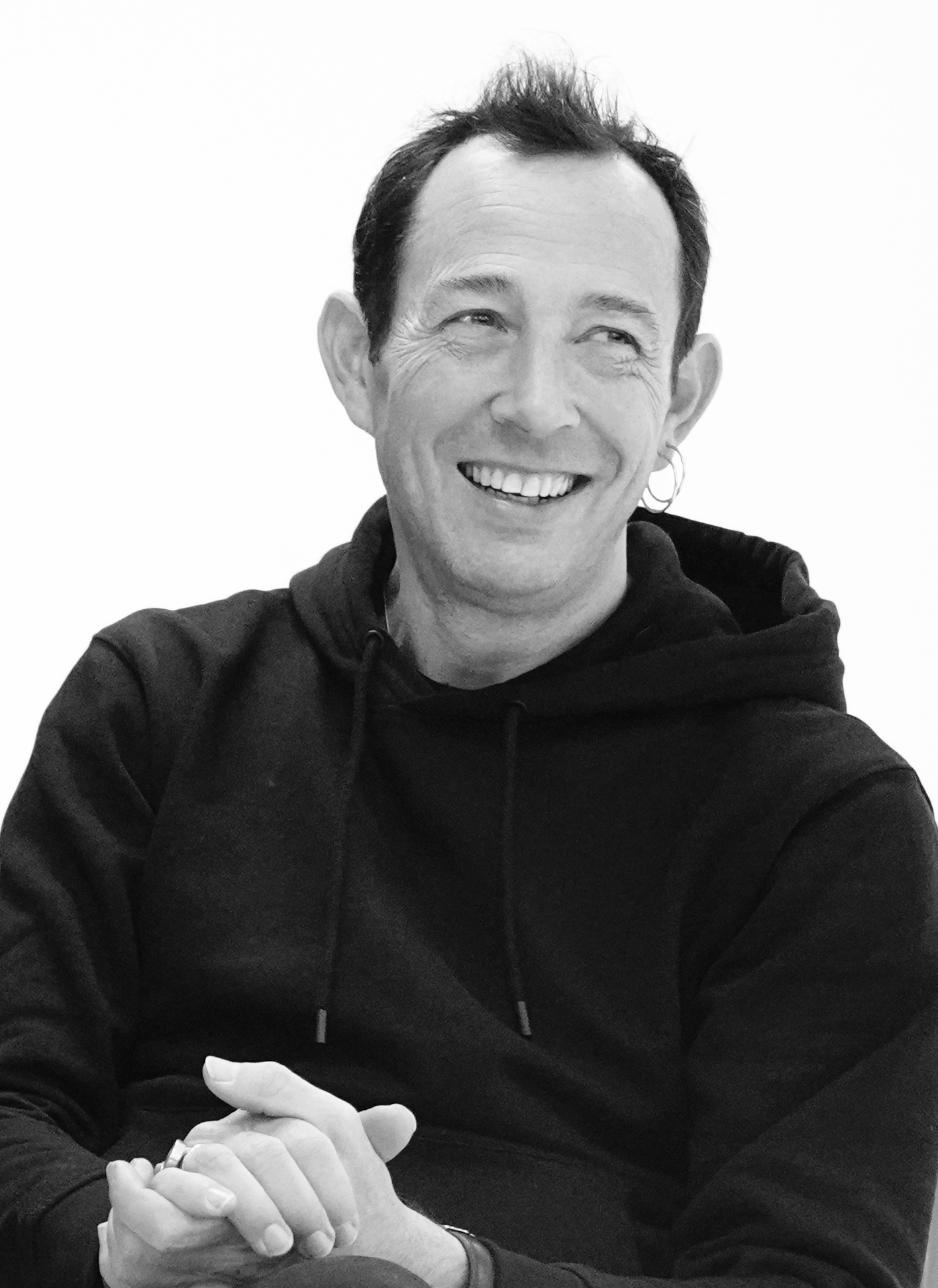
Thomas B Reverdy (2024)

Thomas B. Reverdy is a French novelist.

== Biography ==
During his studies of literature at the university, Reverdy worked on Antonin Artaud, Roger Gilbert-Lecomte and Henri Michaux. He also participated in the journal La Femelle du requin, where he directed the publication of issue 4 to issue 12. He obtained the aggregation of modern letters in 2000. Since then, he has taught at the Lycée Jean Renoir in Seine-Saint-Denis. He tells of this experience as a teacher in Le Lycée de nos rêves, co-written with Cyril Delhay, then in charge of the "Priority Education Agreement" program at Sciences-Po.

His three first novels, La Montée des eaux (Éditions du Seuil, 2003), Le Ciel pour mémoire (Seuil, 2005) and Les Derniers Feux (Seuil, 2008), constitute a sort of poetic cycle. They address the themes of mourning, friendship and writing. Les Derniers Feux won the 2008 Prix Valery-Larbaud.

In 2010, L'Envers du monde breaks with this autobiographical vein by proposing a police intrigue with moral and philosophical implications in New York after 11 September. The following year the book received the Prix François Mauriac from the Académie Français.

Published in August 2013, Les Évaporés, is retained in the final selection of the Prix du roman Fnac, in the selection of the Prix Goncourt and in that of the Prix Décembre. It was crowned the same year by the Grand Prix Thyde Monnier of the Société des gens de lettres (SGDL) and in 2014 by the Prix Joseph-Kessel. In 2013 it also won the Prix de la Page 112.

In 2015, his novel, Il était une ville, was retained in the Goncourt selection and was awarded the Prix des libraires.

== Works ==
- 2003: La Montée des eaux, Seuil
- 2005: Le Ciel pour mémoire, Seuil
- 2008: Les Derniers Feux, Seuil, Prix Valery-Larbaud 2008
- 2008: Le Lycée de nos Rêves, Hachette Littérature, (with Cyril Delhay)
- 2009: Collection irraisonnée de préfaces à des livres fétiches, Intervalles, (collective direction with Martin Page)
- 2010: L'Envers du monde, Seuil, Prix François Mauriac 2011
- 2013: Les Évaporés, Flammarion, Grand Prix Thyde Monnier de la Société des gens de lettres (SGDL), 2013 - Prix Joseph-Kessel 2014.
- 2015: Il était une ville, Flammarion, Prix Escale du livre 2016.
- 2017 Jardin des colonies, Flammarion, 2017 (with Sylvain Venayre)
- 2018 L'Hiver du mécontentement, Flammarion, 2018 - Prix Interallié 2018
