= Jean-Marc Parisis =

French writer and journalist

Jean-Marc Parisis (French pronunciation: [ʒɑ̃ maʁk paʁizi]; born 1962) is a French writer and journalist. He is the author of seven novels, five stories and a biography, as well as various prefaces and anthologies.

== Biography ==
After studying letters (hypokhâgne and khâgne at lycée Lakanal at Sceaux, which inspired him Le Lycée des artistes), Jean-Marc Parisis made his debuts at Libération at age 20. Since 1983, he has written articles in numerous newspapers and magazines: Libération, Le Figaro Littéraire, Le Quotidien de Paris, Metro, Le Monde, Le Point, Le Figaro Magazine...

For the cinema, he wrote with Philippe Eineck the scenario of La Taule (2000) by Alain Robak which stars Claude Brasseur, Olivier Martinez, Gilbert Melki, Saïd Taghmaoui and Stéphane Guillon.

He directed the collection "La Désinvolture" at éditions du Quai Voltaire from 1987 to 1989 and the collection "Colère" at Éditions du Rocher from 2000 to 2005.

== Works ==
=== Novels ===
- 1987: La Mélancolie des fast foods, Grasset
- 1992: Le Lycée des artistes, Grasset (prix littéraire de la vocation)
- 2000: Depuis toute la vie, Grasset
- 2005: Physique, Stock
- 2007: Avant, pendant, après, Stock (prix Roger Nimier)
- 2009: Les Aimants, Stock
- 2012: La Recherche de la couleur, Stock

=== Biography ===
- 1995: Reiser, biography of Jean-Marc Reiser, Grasset

=== Narrations ===
- 2002: Mariage à la parisienne, narration, National Geographic.
- 2003: Renvoi d'ascenseur, La Table Ronde.
- 2013: La Mort de Jean-Marc Roberts, La Table Ronde
- 2014: Les Inoubliables, Flammarion.
- 2016: À côté, jamais avec, JC Lattès.

=== Prefaces ===
- 1995: Immédiatement, by Dominique de Roux, series "La petite vermillon", La Table Ronde
- 1999: La robe de laine, by Henry Bordeaux, Éditions du Rocher
- 2007: La Mort de L.- F. Céline, by Dominique de Roux, series "La petite vermillon", La Table Ronde
- 2009: Les fiancées sont froides, by Guy Dupré, series "La petite vermillon", La Table Ronde
- 2010: L’Écologie, by Reiser, Glénat
- 2011: Les Années Pilote, by Reiser, Glénat
- La Peau de chagrin, by Honoré de Balzac, Flammarion, Coll. GF, 2013. This presentation was performed as a reading at Théâtre de l'Odéon.
- Cent manières d'être ridicule, by Barbey d'Aurevilly, Flammarion, Coll. GF, 2015. Presentation of the text in the form of an imaginary dialogue with Barbey d'Aurevilly.

=== Anthologies ===
- 1988: Au Marbre, by Guy Dupré, Françoise Sagan and François Nourissier, Quai Voltaire/La Désinvolture
- 1999: Une bibliothèque d'écrivains, Éditions du Rocher
- 2008: Reiser à la une, Glénat
- 2013: Reiser, Glénat

== Literary prizes ==
- Prix littéraire de la vocation in 1992, for Le Lycée des artistes.
- Prix Roger Nimier in 2007, for Avant, pendant, après.
- Finalist of Prix Renaudot in 2009 for Les aimants.
- Prix de la Page 112 in 2012 for La Recherche de la couleur
- Finalist of Prix Renaudot in 2014 for Les inoubliables.
