= Geille =

Geille is a surname. Notable people with the surname include:

- Annick Geille, French journalist
- Frédéric Geille (1896–1976), French military officer
