= Prix François Mauriac =

Prix François Mauriac may refer to:

- Prix François Mauriac (Académie française), a French literary prize awarded since 1994
- Prix François Mauriac (Aquitaine), a French literary prize awarded by the Aquitaine regional authority, first in 1985, and revived in 2002
