= L'Instant Durable =

French publishing and distribution company

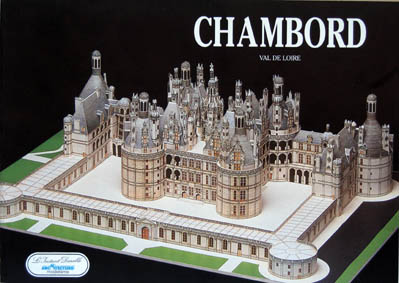
Cover of the L'Instant Durable Château de Chambord model book

L'Instant Durable (French pronunciation: [lɛ̃stɑ̃ dyʁabl]) was a French brand of paper models of architectural structures produced by Société Presse Régie Édition Publicité (SOPREP), a publishing company based in Clermont-Ferrand, France, active from 1967 to 2016.

== History ==
Paul de Boever, architect, and Alain de Bussac who was working in the graphic arts and industries, conceived the L'Instant Durable brand, influenced by the tradition of architectural paper modelling introduced by the Épinal printworks in the 19th century. They created the concept of the livre-maquette (model book): the cutouts were bound in a book, which included a historic text on the architectural object. It was translated into several languages. The authors were architects and artists who used the latest reproduction techniques. All the structures were represented at a similar scale (1/250 or, more rarely, 1/500).

In 1983, the collection Architecture et Modélisme is launched with the first title being on the Château de Chenonceau (architects P. De Boever and Bernard Deubelbeiss, texts A. de Bussac).

From 1984 onward, several titles appear each year in the model-book collection, each one requiring two years preparation. The publishing house gathers together new architects : Thierry Hatot, Jean-Marie Lemaire, Jean-Tristan Roquebert and new graphic artists and illustrators : Anne-Marie Piaulet, Pierre Guérin, Hughes Renier, Jacques Martin (creator of the comic book characters Alix and Enak).

In 1986, creation of a collection of postcard models to cut out representing world-famous monuments, with a definite predominance of European monuments, as well as historic statuettes. This collection includes more than 150 titles in its catalogue in 2009. In the same year a collection of die-cut model cards makes its debut.

In 1991, the new collection Grand Angle proposes models on more varied themes to complement the models consecrated to architecture.

In 1998, launching of Compas, a collection of books on art and architecture in the form of mini encyclopaedias with the collaboration of specialists such as François Taillandier (Grand Prix du roman de l'Académie française), Thierry Hatot (lauréat du Salon du Livre d'Architecture de Briey), Bénédicte Tézenas du Montcel, Alain Berghmans, Bernard Deubelbeiss.

In 2000 : L'Instant Durable secures the exclusive distribution of the Éditions Paléo, specialists in the publication of reference texts (from Antiquity to 20th century) in their integral version.

SOPREP entered liquidation proceedings in 2016. Hatot stayed active as a designer, and L'Instant Durable publications were taken over by another company, under the L'Autre Chemin brand.

== Bibliography ==
- Collective : Architecture à découper, Stichting Kunstprojecten, Rotterdam, 1987, ISBN 90-71893-01-4
- Dieter Nievergelt (2000). Architecture de papier. Lausanne: Musée historique de Lausanne. ISBN 2-9515033-2-6.
  Historique des maquettes d'architecture en carton et des éditeurs, complété par une compilation des modèles existants en 2000.
- Liane Strüver; Dieter Nievergelt (2007). Arbeitskreis Geschichte des Kartonmodellbaus (AGK) Heft 7 (in German). Hambourg: Streuer and Strüver Gmbh.
  Historique de la société, conception des modèles et catalogue : article rédigé à l'issue d'une interview d'Alain de Bussac par Liane Strüver le 22 juin 2006 et d'informations obtenues de la société en 2007.
- collectif (1987). Architecture à découper (in French). Rotterdam: Stichting Kunstprojecten. ISBN 90-71893-01-4.
  Réalisé en collaboration avec la Caisse Nationale des Monuments Historiques, l'ouvrage présente, après un historique partant de la fin du XVII^{e} siècle, plusieurs maquettes du monde entier, dont celles de L'Instant Durable.
- Jean-Charles Trebbi (2010). L'art de la découpe: design et décoration (in French). Paris: Éditions Alternatives. p. 29. ISBN 978-2-86227-647-2.
  L'auteur évoque "la découpe sur différents matériaux, en particulier le papier, support remis en valeur depuis un quart de siècle en France par l'Instant Durable pour représenter le patrimoine architectural".
