= Prix littéraire de la vocation =

The prix littéraire de la vocation is a literary prize. Established in 1976 by the fondation Marcel-Bleustein-Blanchet pour la vocation, it is intended to help a young French-speaking novelists aged 18 to 30 years.

== List of winners ==
- 1976: Les Régions céréalières by Jean-Marc Lovay, Éditions Gallimard (also bourse Cino Del Duca)
- 1977: Une fille pour l'hiver by Alain Leblanc, Groupe Flammarion
- 1978: Tristes Banlieues by Walter Prevost, Éditions Grasset
- 1981: Saad by Alain Blottière, Gallimard
- 1982: Loin d'Aswerda by Jean-Marie Laclavetine, Gallimard
- 1983: L'Exil de Taurus by Paul Le-Jéloux, Obsidiane
- 1984: Poisson d'amour by Didier Van Cauwelaert, Éditions du Seuil
- 1985: Bravoure by Emmanuel Carrère, éditions P.O.L
- 1986: La Salle de bain by Jean-Philippe Toussaint, Éditions de Minuit
- 1989: Duo forte by Éric Holder, Grasset
- 1992: Le Lycée des artistes by Jean-Marc Parisis, Grasset
- 1993: Le Sabotage amoureux by Amélie Nothomb, Albin Michel
- 1995: Absinthe by Christophe Bataille, éditions Arléa
- 1996: Les Funambules by Antoine Bello, Gallimard
- 1997: Le Grenadier by Dominique Mainard, Gallimard
- 1999 : Porte de la Paix Céleste by Shan Sa, Éditions du Rocher
- 2000: Sauvageons by Benjamin Berton, Gallimard
- 2001: Le Chien d'Ulysse by Salim Bachi, Gallimard
- 2002: L'Absolue Perfection du crime by Tanguy Viel, Éditions de Minuit
- 2003: Chlore by Thibault Lang-Willar, Éditions Denoël
- 2004: Génération spontanée by Christophe Ono-Dit-Biot, Plon
- 2005: L'Angoisse de la première phrase by Bernard Quiriny, Éditions Phébus
- 2006: Un baiser à la russe by Gaspard Koenig, Grasset (also Prix Jean-Freustié)
- 2007: Supplément au roman national by Jean-Éric Boulin, Stock
- 2008: Jeune Professionnel by Guillaume Noyelle, éditions Bartillat
- 2009: Chute libre by Émilie de Turckheim, éditions du Rocher
- 2010: Les Veilleurs by Vincent Message, Le Seuil.
- 2011: ex æquo L'Envers des autres by Kaouther Adimi, éditions Actes Sud and Requiem pour Lola rouge by Pierre Ducrozet, Grasset
- 2012: The Truth About the Harry Quebert Affair by Joël Dicker, Éditions de Fallois
- 2013: Tu montreras ma tête au peuple by François-Henri Désérable, Gallimard
- 2014: Constellation by Adrien Bosc, Stock
- 2015: Le Voyage d'Octavio by Miguel Bonnefoy, Éditions Rivages
- 2016: L'éveil by Line Papin, Stock
- 2018: Nage Libre by Boris Bergmann, Calmann-Lévy

== See also ==
- Fondation de la vocation
- Prix de la vocation en poésie
