= Alexis Salatko =

French writer of Ukrainian origin (born 1959)

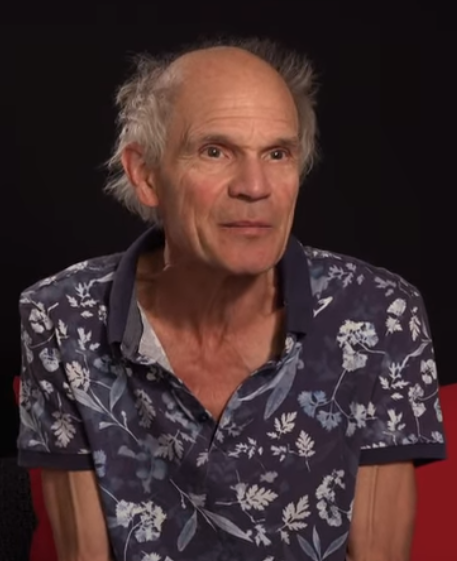
- In a 2025 interview
- Born: Alexis Wladimir Marie Salatko-Petryszcze; 1 January 1959 (age 67); Suresnes, France
- Occupation: Writer

Alexis Wladimir Marie Salatko-Petryszcze (born 1 January 1959) is a French writer of Ukrainian origin.

== Biography ==
Alexis Salatko was born in Suresnes on 1 January 1959.

== Works ==
- 1981: Le Tigre d'écume, Paris, Éditions Gallimard, Collection Blanche, 289 p. BnF 34679960x
- 1984: Le Couturier de Zviska , Paris, Presses de la Renaissance, series "Romans", 183 p. ISBN 2-85616-305-X
- 1987: S'il pleut, il pleuvra, Presses de la Renaissance, 200 p. ISBN 2-85616-429-3
- 1988: Rêves d'escales, escales de rêve followed by Sur les rails, été 1921, Cherbourg-Octeville, Éditions Isoète, series "Rivages d'encre", 175 p. ISBN 2-905385-14-6
- 1990: Vingt-deux nuances de gris, Presses de la Renaissance, series "Les Nouvelles françaises", 184 p. ISBN 2-85616-551-6
- 1993: Bill et Bela, Presses de la Renaissance, series "Les romans français", 166 p. ISBN 2-85616-667-9

- bourse Thyde Monnier 1993

- 1995: Notre-Dame des Queens, phot. by Guillaume Brown, hist. of Jean-Louis Libourel and Marie-Hélène Renou-Enault, Cherbourg-Octeville, Éditions Isoète, 85 p. ISBN 2-905385-65-0
- 2000: Mauve Haviland, Paris, Éditions du Seuil, series "Roman français", 384 p. ISBN 2-02-035959-6
- 2002: Tube..., Cherbourg-Octeville, France, Éditions Isoète, 62 p. ISBN 2-913920-25-X
- 2003: La fille qui hurle sur l'affiche, Gallimard, Collection Blanche, 139 p. ISBN 2-07-076820-1
- 2004: Milledgeville, sanctuaire des oiseaux et des fous. Flannery O'Connor, un autoportrait, Paris, Éditions Fayard, 215 p. ISBN 2-213-61845-3
- 2005: Horowitz et mon père, Fayard, 187 p. ISBN 2-213-62265-5

2006: - prix Jean-Freustié 2006
- prix littéraire du Cotentin 2006

- 2006! Un fauteuil au bord du vide, Fayard, 207 p. ISBN 2-213-62615-4.

- Prix François Mauriac of the Académie française 2007 - bronze medal.

- 2007: China et la grande fabrique, Fayard, 385 p. ISBN 978-2-213-62683-3.
- 2011: Celine's band, Paris, Éditions Robert Laffont, 201 p. ISBN 978-2-221-12584-7
- 2012: Le Parieur, Fayard, 262 p. ISBN 978-2-213-62685-7
- 2013: Folles de Django, Robert Laffont, 276 p. ISBN 978-2-221-13219-7
