= The Birth of Love =

1993 film

- Theatrical release poster
- French: La Naissance de l'amour
- Directed by: Philippe Garrel
- Written by: Philippe Garrel; Muriel Cerf; Marc Cholodenko
- Produced by: Pascal Caucheteux
- Starring: Lou Castel; Jean-Pierre Léaud; Johanna ter Steege; Dominique Reymond; Marie-Paule Laval
- Cinematography: André Clément; Raoul Coutard
- Edited by: Sophie Coussein; Yann Dedet; Nathalie Hubert; Alexandra Strauss
- Music by: John Cale
- Production companies: Why Not Productions; Vega Films; La Sept Cinéma
- Distributed by: Pan-Européenne Distribution
- Release date: 22 September 1993
- Running time: 94 minutes
- Countries: France; Switzerland
- Language: French

The Birth of Love (French: La Naissance de l'amour) is a 1993 drama film directed by Philippe Garrel. Garrel also wrote the screenplay together with his long-time collaborators Muriel Cerf and Marc Cholodenko.

== Cast ==
- Lou Castel as Paul
- Jean-Pierre Léaud as Marcus
- Johanna ter Steege as Ulrika
- Dominique Reymond as Hélène
- Marie-Paule Laval as Fauchon
- Serge Thiriet as Hélène's lover
- Aurélia Alcaïs as Young woman
- Max McCarthy as Pierre
