= Boris Bergmann =

French writer, Prix Fénéon winner 2018

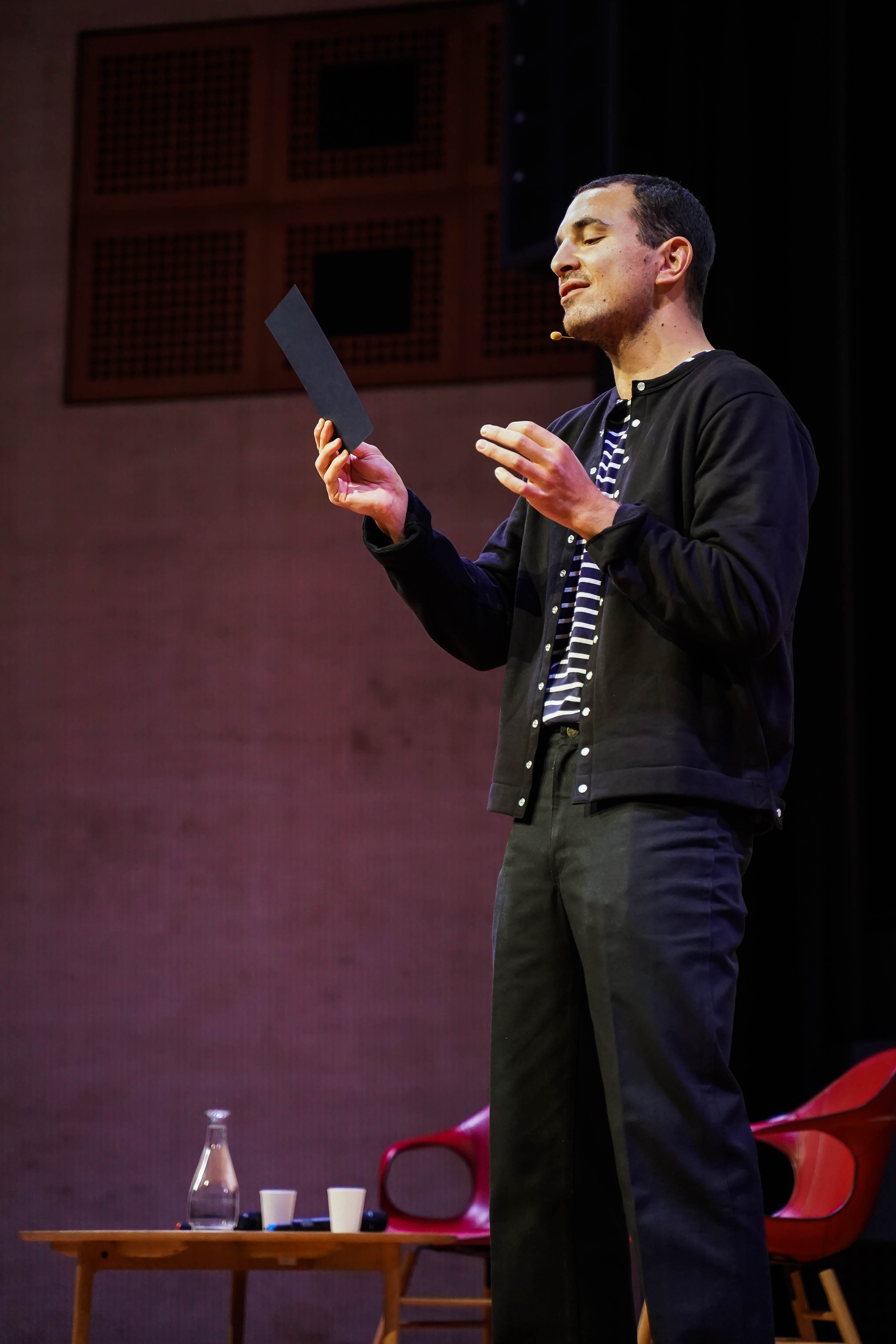
- Bergmann at Colloque Art et Engagement at the Musée du Louvre in September 2019
- Born: 1992 (age 33–34); Paris, France
- Occupation: Writer
- Writing career
- Language: French
- Notable awards: Prix littéraire de la vocation Prix Fénéon

Boris Bergmann, born in Paris on 1 February 1992, is a French writer.

== Biography ==
His first novel, Viens là que je te tue ma belle, was published by Éditions Scali when he was just sixteen years old. The story is told via an imaginary journal of a young teenager who discovers the nightlife and transgression through rock and roll. It received the prix de Flore for high school students.

The book was adapted in 2012 for Arte by director Jean-Stéphane Sauvaire under the title of Punk, with Béatrice Dalle, Paul Bartel, fr:Marie-Ange Casta and Bernie Bonvoisin.

In January 2010, he published his second novel, 1,000 Mensonges, from éditions Denoël. It is a story about the confidences of a liar who falls in love.

In August 2016, he published his third novel, Déserteur, from Calmann-Levy. It is the story of a young hacker used by the army to program drones in the war against the caliphate. Sent on a mission to the desert, he will be forced to take part in terrible acts that will push him to enlist and confront himself for the first time.

He also contributed to numerous literary journals, such as La Règle du Jeu, (Note: La règle du jeu n°56. Grasset, 2015.) Edwarda, L'écho d'Orphée, Les Poètes Bodybuildés, Possession Immédiate, as well as to various magazines and newspapers.

In September 2017, he was welcomed as a resident writer at Villa Medici, in the 2017–2018 class. His project focused on fanaticism.

In January 2018, he published his fourth novel, Nage libre : the history of Issa, a popular young man from working-class Paris, who will free himself through swimming, the pursuit of desires, and friendship. Nage Libre won the prix littéraire de la vocation, as well as the fr:Prix Révélation de la Société des Gens de Lettres.

== Publications ==
=== Novels ===
- Viens là que je te tue ma belle. Paris: Éditions Scali, 2007. 159 pp. ISBN 978-2-35012-165-9; reissued Paris: LGF, Le Livre de poche, no. 31064, 2008. ISBN 978-2-253-12550-1
- Nous sommes cernés par les cibles. Illustrated by Gabriel Gay. Paris: Éditions Scali, Scali Graphic, 2008. 128 pp. ISBN 978-2-35012-249-6
- 1000 mensonges. Paris: Éditions Denoël, 2010. 117 pp. ISBN 978-2-207-26142-2
- Déserteur. Paris: Éditions Calmann-Lévy, Littérature française, 2016. 278 pp. ISBN 978-2-7021-6049-7; reissued Paris: LGF, Le Livre de poche, no. 35120, 2018. ISBN 978-2-253-07097-9
- Nage libre. Paris: Éditions Calmann-Lévy, Littérature française, 2018. 312 pp. ISBN 978-2-7021-6140-1. Winner of the Prix littéraire de la vocation; reissued Paris: LGF, Le Livre de poche, no. 35795, 2021. ISBN 978-2-253-90681-0
- Les corps insurgés. Paris: Éditions Calmann-Lévy, Littérature française, 2020. 318 pp. ISBN 978-2-7021-8011-2; reissued Paris: LGF, Le Livre de poche, no. 37831, 2024. ISBN 978-2-253-07879-1

=== Novella ===
- Dites-le avec des peurs, followed by La guerre sainte: 1940 by René Daumal. Paris: Éditions Marcel, Prismes, 2018. 88 pp. ISBN 9782956341307

=== Collections, essays and short stories ===
- Alumni, Sciences Po. La Bêtise artificielle: Et 29 autres nouvelles qui éclairent notre temps. fr:Librinova, 2024. (Artificial Stupidity: And 29 other short stories that illuminate our time. Stories by Paris Institute of Political Studies alumni, including Bergmann, who contributed, "Le professeur Sogol.")
- Bergmann, Boris. “PIERRE-Ange CARLOTTI.” Interview Magazine, 47, no. 3 (2017): 78–87. EBSCOhost.
- Bergmann, Boris. “Dora DIAMANT.” Interview Magazine, 47, no. 7 (2017): 68–69. EBSCOhost.
- Collective. Revue Passager. N°2 (July 2025). Actes Sud. ISBN 978-2-959589-01-0.
- Médioni, Franck. Les mots de la musique: 222 musiciens du XXe siècle par 222 écrivains. Fayard, 2024. (The words of music: 222 musicians in the 20th century, by 222 writers, including Bergmann, who contributed, "Je connais Iggy Pop.")

== Awards and distinctions ==
- 2018: Prix littéraire de la vocation, for Nage libre
- 2020: Prix Fénéon for literature, for Les Corps insurgés
