= Luba Jurgenson =

French-speaking woman of letters (born 1958)

Luba Jurgenson (Note: Estonian: Ljuba Jürgenson, Russian: Люба (ou Любовь) Юргенсон) (born 1 July 1958) is a French-speaking woman of letters.

She is also a translator, a maître de conférences and codirector (with Anne Coldefy-Faucard) of the series "Poustiaki" at éditions Verdier. Her novel Au lieu du péril (2014) earned her the Prix Valery Larbaud in 2015.

== Biography ==
She was born in Moscow, then-USSR and is of Estonian origin and Russian culture, but emigrated to Paris in 1975 at age 16.

Luba Jurgenson is agrégée in Russian (1997) and holder of a PhD in Slavic Studies (2001). She is a maître de conférences in russian literature at Paris-Sorbonne University. Her field of research is that of the literature of the camps.

After the outbreak of the Russian-Ukrainian war, Jurgenson made anti-war appeals in the French media: "Il faut porter la cause de l’Ukraine à l’Assemblée nationale".

== Translations ==
Her best known translations are:

- 1986: Ivan Goncharov, Oblomov, Éditions L'Âge d'Homme
- 1991: Ana Novac, Les Accidents de l'âme
- 1997-1999, 2003 Nina Berberova, Les Petits Romans, Borodine, Le Cap des tempêtes, Actes Sud,
- 2004: Leonid Guirchovitch, Apologie de la fuite, Verdier
- 2009: Vladimir Toporov, Apologie de Pluchkine, Verdier - Prix Russophonie 2011, for the best translation;
- 2013: Panteleimon Romanov, Camarade Kisliakov, Éditions Héros-Limite; translation nominated at Prix Russophonie 2015

== Works ==
- Les Russes et la Traversée du siècle
- Soljenitsyne et le Destin russe
- Le Soldat de papier.
- Une autre vie
- La Dourova
- Boutique de vie
- Moscou
- Le Serpent bleu
- Lettres à un ami, correspondance avec Isaac Glikman
- La Belle de Moscou
- Mère et fils
- Avoir sommeil
- Le Chamane
- Tolstoï
- Éducation nocturne
- L'Autre
- À la recherche de l'argent perdu
- L'expérience concentrationnaire est-elle indicible ?
- Création et Tyrannie : URSS 1917 - 1991
- Au lieu du péril, 2014, Éditions Verdier, Lagrasse, ISBN 978-2-86432-768-4. Prix Valery Larbaud in 2015.

== Bibliography ==
- 2008: Murielle Lucie Clément, Écrivains franco-russes, Faux titre, p. 200
- 2007: Axel Gasquet, Écrivains multilingues et écritures métisses…, Presses universitaires Blaise-Pascal, p. 14, 181–188
