= Claude Askolovitch =

French journalist and author (born 1962)

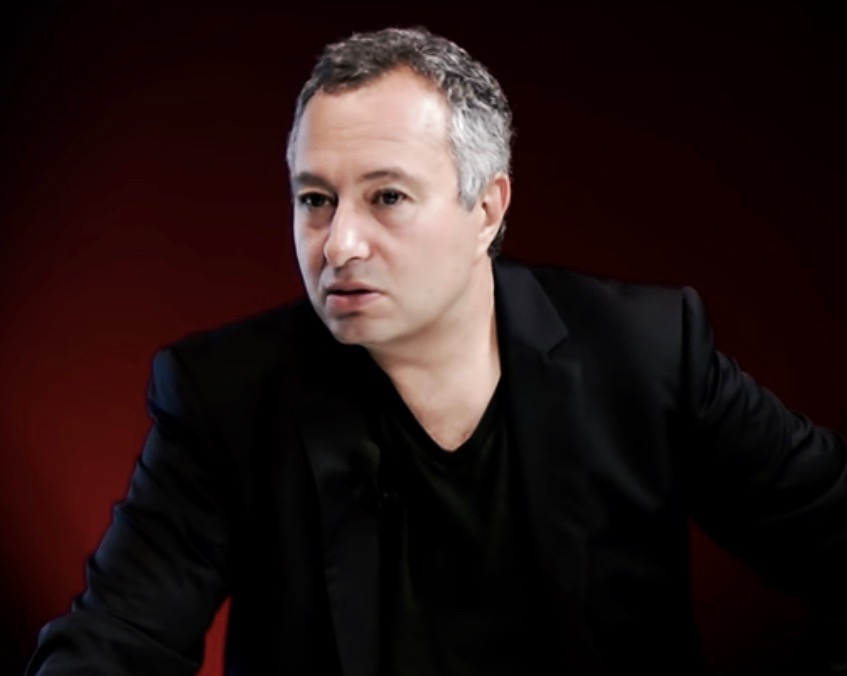
- Born: 18 December 1962 (age 63); Paris, France
- Education: Lycée Chaptal; Paris Dauphine University; Centre de formation des journalistes
- Occupation: Journalist • Author
- Employer: France Inter

Claude Askolovitch (born 18 December 1962) is a French journalist and author.

== Early life ==
Claude Askolovitch was born on 18 December 1962 in Paris. He earned a bachelor's degree in economics from Paris Dauphine University and a postgraduate degree from the Centre de formation des journalistes.

== Career ==
Askolovitch began his career at RFO. He later worked for Le Matin de Paris and Le Sport, until he joined Europe 1. He became a journalist for L'Événement du jeudi in 1992. By 1999, he was a journalist for Marianne. He was a correspondent for L'Obs from 2001 to 2008. He became the editor-in-chief of Le Journal du Dimanche in 2008.

Askolovitch is the author of several books. He won the 1999 Prix Décembre for Voyage au bout de la France: Le Front National tel qu'il est.

== Works ==
- Askolovitch, Claude; Attal, Sylvain (1992). La France du piston. Paris: Laffont. ISBN 9782221069349. OCLC 26857160.
- Askolovitch, Claude; Boli, Basile (1994). Black Boli. Paris: Grasset. ISBN 9782246482314. OCLC 37095379.
- Askolovitch, Claude; Dicale, Bertrand; Sitruk, Joseph (1999). Chemin faisant : entretiens. Paris: Flammarion. ISBN 9782080672186. OCLC 44446673.
- Askolovitch, Claude (1999). Voyage au bout de la France : le Front national tel qu'il est. Paris: Grasset. ISBN 9782246519218. OCLC 41530122.
- Askolovitch, Claude (2001). Lionel. Paris: Grasset. ISBN 9782246603818. OCLC 48613737.
- Askolovitch, Claude; Beisson, Eric (2007). Qui connaît Madame Royal ?. Paris: Grasset. ISBN 9782246726517. OCLC 150262336.
- Askolovitch, Claude; Dati, Rachida (2007). Je vous fais juges : entretien avec Claude Askolovitch. Paris: Grasset. ISBN 9782246734017. OCLC 421739085.
- Askolovitch, Claude; Valls, Manuel (2008). Pour en finir avec le vieux socialisme... et être enfin de gauche. Paris: Laffont. ISBN 9782221110195. OCLC 228497766.
- Askolovitch, Claude; Bruel, Patrick (2001). Conversation avec Claude Askolovitch. Paris: Plon. ISBN 9782259201353. OCLC 770224632.
- Askolovitch, Claude (2013). Nos mal-aimés : ces musulmans dont la France ne veut pas. Paris: Grasset. ISBN 9782246801894. OCLC 859139080.
- Askolovitch, Claude (2015). Les grands garçons : Valls, Montebourg, Hamon. Paris: Plon. ISBN 9782259229715. OCLC 904484746.
- Askolovitch, Claude (2017). Comment se dire adieu. Paris: Editions JC Lattès. ISBN 9782709656825.
