= Line Papin =

French writer (born 1995)

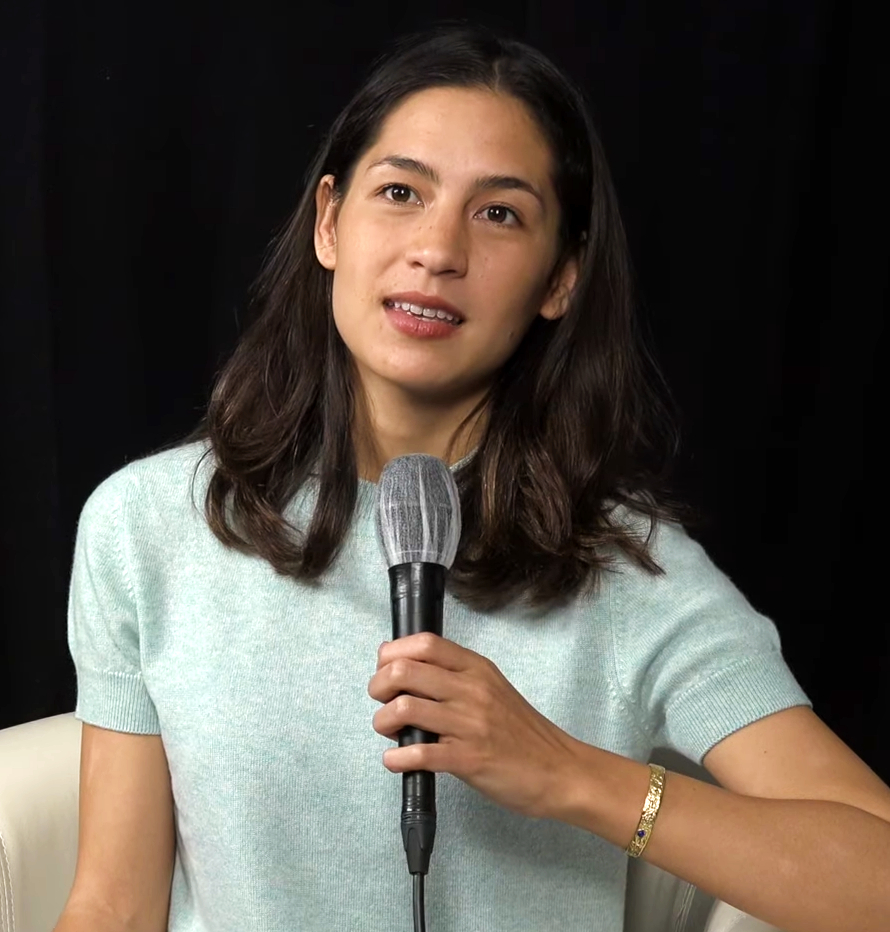
- Papin in 2021
- Born: 30 December 1995 (age 30); Hanoi, Vietnam
- Education: Lycée Fénelon; La Fémis
- Spouse: Marc Lavoine (m. 2020; div. 2022)
- Writing career
- Language: French
- Notable awards: Prix littéraire de la vocation

Line Papin (born 30 December 1995) is a French novelist.

== Biography ==
=== Early life ===
Line Papin was born in Hanoi on 30 December 1995, to a French father who was a historian and a Vietnamese mother who was a translator. She grew up in Vietnam, and at the age of 10, she moved to France where she changed schools five times. Affected by this uprooting, she suffered from anorexia.

After undertaking a khâgne course at the Lycée Fénelon in Paris, she sat an exam for the École normale supérieure. She then continued her studies in cinema and history of art at the Sorbonne.

At 16 years of age, she showed her work to professionals for the first time: the publishing house of Christian Bourgois. She was given good advice and set about doing more work, and at the age of 20, presented a more accomplished text to the Stock publishing house.

=== Literature ===
Her first novel, L'Éveil, was published in August 2016 by Stock. It is the story of four young expats whose voices and lives cross paths. The book received a warm reception from the press, as well as several prizes such as the Prix littéraire de la vocation.

Her second novel, Toni, was published in January 2018 by Stock, and is a story about siblings. She tells of the search for an individual and a childhood lost in the nights of Berlin.

Her third book, Les Os des filles, was published in April 2019. An autobiographical work, it concerns the maternal line of descent and the fragility of existence, over three generations of women, the Vietnam War, exile, and illness. Hailed by the press and booksellers, it was nominated for the Readers' Prize of Le Livre de Poche.

Her fourth novel, Le Cœur en laisse, was published in March 2021.

Une Vie possible, published in 2022, is a novel and essay about women’s body, women’s rights and motherhood.

In 2023, she publishes Après l’amour, a poetry book about love and break up, illustrated by the painter Inès Longevial.

In 2026, she joins Albin Michel Publishing House, and publishes Hanoi Stories, a novel exploring the search for spiritual fulfilment, love and identity.

== Personal life ==
In 2018, she was in a relationship with singer Marc Lavoine. They married on 25 July 2020 and divorced in 2022.

== Literary works ==
=== Novels ===
- L'Éveil, Stock, 2016 – Prix de la Vocation
- Toni, Stock, 2018
- Les Os des filles, Stock, 2019. The Girl Before Her, English translation (Kaya Press.)
- Le Cœur en laisse, Stock, 2021
- Une vie possible, Stock, 2022
- Une vague, Stock, 2025
- Hanoi Stories, Albin Michel, 2026

=== Poetry ===
- Après l’amour, Stock, 2023
