= Roger Grenier =

French writer, journalist and radio animator

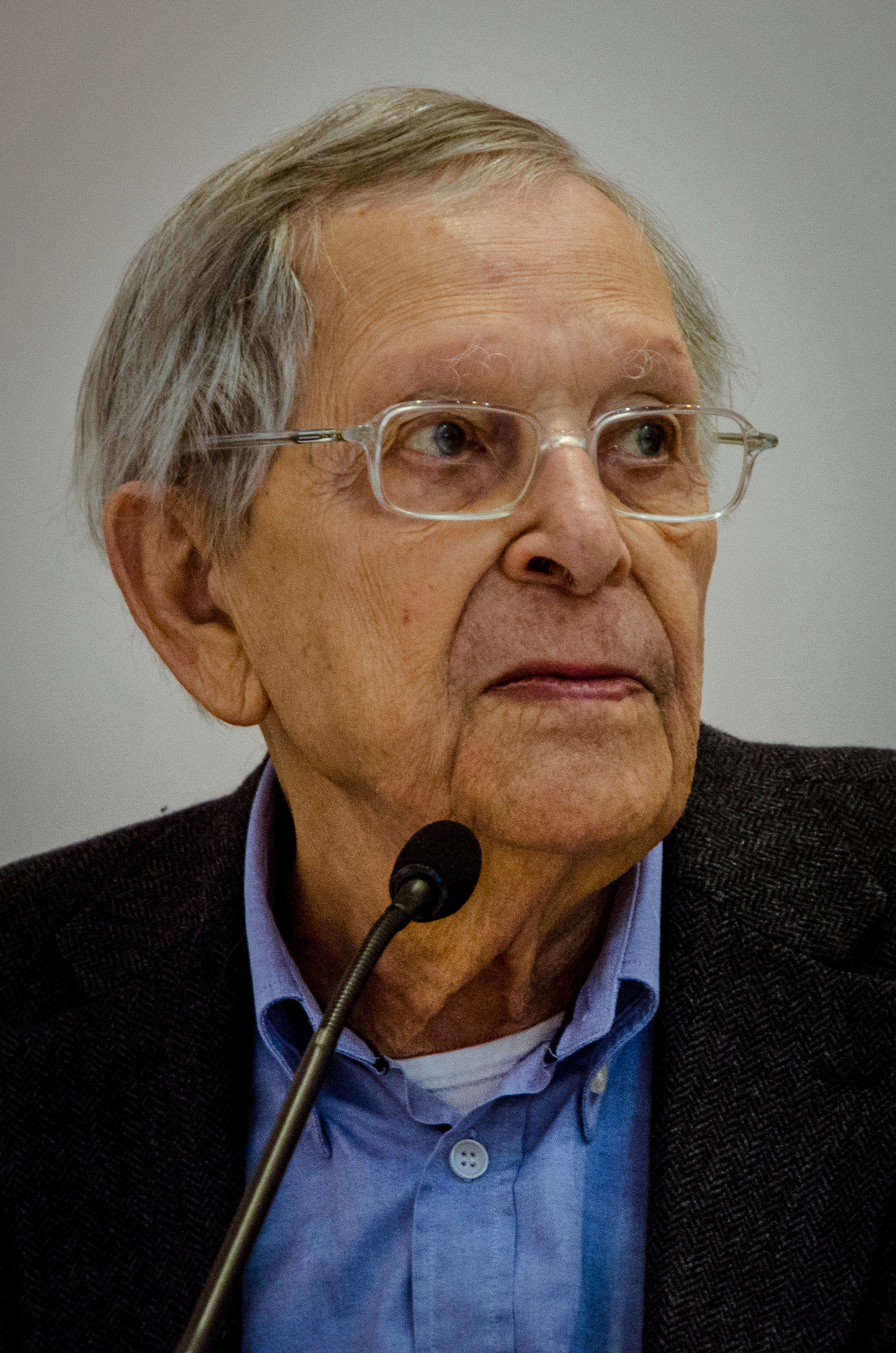
- Roger Grenier in 2014
- Born: 19 September 1919; Caen, France
- Died: 8 November 2017 (aged 98); Paris, France
- Occupations: Writer, novelist
- Spouse(s): Marguerite (195?–197?); Nicole (1979–2017, his death)
- Children: 2 sons
- Writing career
- Language: French
- Years active: 1940–2015
- Notable work: The Difficulty of Being a Dog
- Notable awards: Prix Femina; Prix Albert Camus; Prix de l'Académie Française; Prix Novembre

Roger Grenier (French pronunciation: [ʁɔʒe ɡʁənje]; 19 September 1919 – 8 November 2017) was a French writer, journalist and radio animator. He was Regent of the Collège de ’Pataphysique.

== Biography ==
As a youth, Grenier lived in Pau, where Andrélie opened a shop selling glasses. During the Second World War, he attended classes taught by Gaston Bachelard at the Sorbonne while participating in the French Resistance before actively participating in the 1944 liberation of Paris. In his memoir Paris ma grand'ville, Grenier describes being briefly arrested and narrowly avoiding execution by the Occupation forces on the boulevard Saint-Germain. He was only able to escape after an argument in German broke out among his captors. After the Liberation of Paris, he joined Albert Camus at the newspaper Combat. Grenier later went on to write for the newspaper France Soir. As a journalist, he followed post-war trials which inspired his first essay in 1949 Le Rôle d'accusé. He left professional journalism in 1964 to assume a position on the editorial board of the prominent French publishing house Gallimard. A true man of letters, Grenier was actively involved in many aspects of literary production and criticism. In addition to working as a radio host and a writer for television and cinema, he was a member of the board at Gallimard from 1964 up until his death. Young authors frequently sought out his advice and submitted manuscripts to him for consideration. Grenier was well connected among French authors of his time, such as Joseph Kessel and Albert Camus (whose works Grenier edited after Camus died in 1960), and writers abroad, such as William Faulkner and Yukio Mishimo. His own writing has been recognized by some of the most prominent literary institutions in France. He was a recipient of the Grand prix de l'Académie française in 1985 for his body of work of more than thirty works: novels including the best-sellers Le Palais d'hiver 1965 and Ciné-roman Prix Femina in 1972, as well as essays on Chekov and F. Scott Fitzgerald and memoirs. He is best known in the United States for his work The Difficulty of Being a Dog (Les larmes d'Ulysse), translated by Alice Kaplan. Until his death, he was writing and a busy conference attendee, speaking about his works, literature, Gallimard, or his friends: Albert Camus, and Brassaï.

== Works ==
- 2011 Le palais des livres, translation (in English) by Alice Kaplan, Palace of Books, University of Chicago Press, 2014, ISBN 9780226308340. See an excerpt.
- 2010 Dans le secret d'une photo, translation (in English) by Alice Kaplan, A Box of Photographs, University of Chicago Press, 2013, ISBN 9780226308319.
- 2008 Tchékhov - Récit d'un inconnu et autres nouvelles, préface and dossier, « Folio »
- 2007 Instantanés, souvenirs
- 2006 Trois années after Anton Chekhov's novel, theatre, created in Paris at Petit Montparnasse
- 2005 Andrélie, traits et portraits, Mercure de France
- 2003 Trois tortues et quelques autres, Gibraffaro ???
- 2003 Une nouvelle pour vous, novels
- 2001 Fidèle au poste
- 2001 Roger Grenier ou le droit de se contredire, conversation with Danielle Stéphane, La Passe du vent
- 2000 Le Veilleur, novel
- 1998 Les Larmes d'Ulysse, translation (in English) by Alice Kaplan, The Difficulty of Being a Dog, University of Chicago Press, 2000, ISBN 9780226308289. See an excerpt.
- 1997 Quelqu'un de ce temps-là, novels
- 1994 Trois heures du matin Scott Fitzgerald, essay
- 1993 La Marche turque, novels
- 1992 Regardez la neige qui tombe. Impressions de Tchekhov, essay, Prix Novembre Rééd. Gallimard, coll. « Folio », 1997
- 1991 Villas anglaises à Pau, photographs by Anne Garde, éd. Marrimpouey
- 1991 Partita, novel
- 1989 Pascal Pia ou Le droit au néant, essay
- 1988 Rues, 1934–1988, photographs by J. Dubois, Nathan
- 1988 La Mare d'Auteuil, novel
- 1987 Albert Camus, soleil et ombre : une biographie intellectuelle, essay, Prix Albert Camus, Rééd. 1991, (in Italian) Albert Camus, a cura di Roger Grenier, Milano, Bompiani, 1988. Réed. 1992
- 1987 Un guide intime, Prague, éd. Autrement
- 1987 Brassaï, essay
- 1986 Le Pierrot noir, novel, Rééd. Gallimard, coll. « Folio », 1996, Another November, Bison Books, 1998
- 1985 Il te faudra quitter Florence, novel 1985, Rééd. Gallimard, « Folio », 1994
- 1983 Oeuvres complètes d'Albert Camus, two volumes, Club de l'honnête homme
- 1982 La Fiancée de Fragonard, novels
- 1982 Album Camus. Commented iconography, La Pléiade
- 1980 La Follia, novel
- 1979 Un air de famille, tale
- 1978 Iscan, éd. Horay, coll. « Le Territoire de l'œil »
- 1977 La Salle de rédaction, novels
- 1975 Le Miroir des eaux, Prix de la nouvelle de l'Académie française
- 1972 Ciné-roman, Prix Femina, Rééd. Gallimard, coll. « Soleil », 1973 et « Folio », 1995, TV adaptation in 1978
- 1972 Une maison place des fêtes, novels
- 1971 Avant une guerre, novel
- 1971 Claude Roy
- 1965 Le Palais d'hiver, novel, Rééd. Gallimard, coll. « Folio », 1973
- 1961 Le Silence, novels, Rééd. 1984
- 1960 La Voie romaine, novel
- 1958 Les Embuscades, novel, Rééd. Gallimard, coll. « Folio », 1980
- 1953 Limelight. Les Feux de la rampe, novel after Charles Chaplin's scenario
- 1953 Les Monstres, novel
- 1949 Le Rôle d'accusé, essay
