= Jean Parvulesco =

Romanian-French philosopher, writer and journalist (1928–2010)

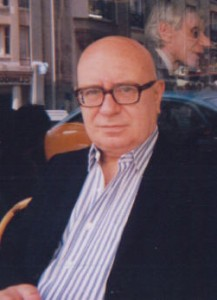
- Born: Ion Pârvulescu; September 29, 1929; Pitești, Romania
- Died: November 21, 2010 (aged 81); Boulogne-Billancourt, France
- Citizenship: Romanian; French
- Occupations: philosopher, writer, film critic, journalist

Education
- Education: University of Paris

Philosophical work
- Era: Contemporary philosophy
- Region: French philosophy
- School: Pan-European nationalism Eurasianism
- Institutions: GRECE
- Notable students: Alexander Dugin
- Language: French

Jean Parvulesco (born Ion Pârvulescu, September 29, 1929 – November 21, 2010) was a Romanian-French far-right philosopher, writer and journalist. An heir to Traditionalist thought in the perennialist lineage of René Guénon, but above all that of Julius Evola, a sympathizer of the Nouvelle Droite and an atypical Catholic close to a form of telluric pantheism, he is best known for his numerous novels and for a new, poetic style of writing infused with intuitions and “mystical” enigmas. He had an important influence on several far-right figures in Europe.

== Biography ==
Born in Pitești, Romania in 1929, having attended a cadet school, Ion Pârvulescu fled the newly established communist regime of Romania in July 1948 by swimming across the Danube into Yugoslavia. Arrested by the Yugoslav authorities and sent to a political forced-labor camp near Tuzla, he escaped and clandestinely reached Austria in August 1949. He arrived in Paris in 1950 and attended philosophy and literature courses at the Sorbonne, though without serious commitment, preferring instead to frequent literary, artistic, and cinematic circles. He also served as secretary-general of the “Union Center of Democratic Romanian Journalists and Publicists in Exile,” founded in 1950 and comprising about thirty members. He was later naturalized as a French citizen. He also had ties to the Iron Guard exiles in France.

In February 1978, he was among the founding members of the Committee of Intellectuals for a Europe of Freedoms.

The author of a diverse body of work (novels, essays, and poetry), Jean Parvulesco began publishing from the 1980s onward. He became close to the Groupement de recherche et d'études pour la civilisation européenne (GRECE), then to its splinter group European Synergies, as well as to Raymond Abellio, Jacques Bergier, Arno Breker, Jean Daniélou, Guy Dupré, Mircea Eliade, Vintila Horia, Henry Montaigu, Louis Pauwels, Dominique de Roux, and in the world of cinema to Jean-Luc Godard and actresses such as Carole Bouquet, Aurora Cornu, Ava Gardner, and Bulle Ogier.

He maintained relations with authors as diverse as Pierre Boutang, Alain de Benoist, Marguerite Duras, Julius Evola, Martin Heidegger, Michel Marmin, Ezra Pound, Michel d’Urance, among others. In 1973, he met Michel Mourlet, then editor of the magazine Matulu, where he published a long article on Le Cercle rouge by Jean-Pierre Melville. He also published three major studies on Mourlet:

- Renaissance of Tragedy (postface to La Sanglière, Loris Talmart, 1987)
- What Lies Behind the Song of Maguelonne (La Revue littéraire, Éditions Leo Scheer, no. 16, July 2005)
- History of a Malefice (Five Secret Paths in the Night, DVX, 2008)

From the late 1950s onward, he frequented nationalist-revolutionary circles alongside figures such as Jean Dides. He admired the Organisation de l'armée secrète (OAS) and belonged to the Nationalist Revolutionary Movement. He later wrote geopolitical articles in various publications, including the daily newspaper Combat, advocating the creation of a “Paris–Berlin–Moscow axis” to counter “Anglo-Saxon hegemony,” a concept previously advanced by Gabriel Hanotaux and mentioned by Raymond Abellio in the second volume of his memoirs Les Militants.

A fictional writer character bearing his name appears in À bout de souffle (1959); because of his proximity to the OAS and his presence in Spain at the time of filming, the role was played by Jean-Pierre Melville due to their physical resemblance. Antoine de Baecque interprets this appearance as a “cryptically encoded underground reference to a young fascist of Romanian origin, Jean Parvulesco, encountered by Godard at the Latin Quarter film club, who fascinated him by his radically extremist positions, a fervent admirer of General Francisco Franco’s legions and of the Nouvelle Vague”. He also appears in films by Éric Rohmer (The Tree, the Mayor and the Mediatheque), Barbet Schroeder (Maîtresse), among others.

From June to August 1960, he published a series of seven articles in the Spanish Falangist magazine Primer Plano, strongly favorable to the Nouvelle Vague, attempting to demonstrate that it was imbued with far-right ideas. The academic Hélène Liogier notes that he “seems particularly well informed about Nouvelle Vague films and directors,” even claiming personal acquaintance with them.

Jean Parvulesco collaborated with Matulu, La Place royale, Contrelittérature, Éléments, Nouvelle École, Rébellion, L'Athenaeum (Russian international review), La Revue littéraire, among others. He was also close to screenwriter-director Tony Baillargeat, who announced plans to devote a documentary to him. He appeared as an extra in Maîtresse by Barbet Schroeder, opening a door to Gérard Depardieu in the opening scenes before turning him away. In 1996, he appeared in Bertrand Delcour’s novel Blocus solus, centered on the figure of Guy Debord.

Translator and essayist Philippe Baillet, who knew him, described him as an “inimitable prankster and literary madman (but mad with a feigned and controlled madness)”.

In 2015, the Romanian branch of RussiaToday organised a conference dedicated to Jean Parvulesco at the National Library of Romania, among the attendees being Alexander Dugin and his daughter, Daria Dugina.

In 2017, an international conference devoted to his work was held in Moldova, which was attended by the then President of Moldova Igor Dodon. Other attendees included Iurie Roșca and Presidential advisor Ion Ceban.

Christophe Bourseiller, close to Jean-Luc Godard in his childhood and who met Jean Parvulesco in 2010 to invite him to the TV program Ce soir (ou jamais !), devoted his book En cherchant Parvulesco to the relationships between the three men. Romanian journalist Mirela Roznoveanu described him as " a strange character, a mixture of genius and legend, an original and paradoxical mind". In the volume At the water of Babylon, Monica Lovinescu reminds of “Jean Parvulescu as so amateur of apocalypses and who as his “fascist” available rendered impeccably the agonical days and nights of camp”.

== Private life ==
Jean Parvulesco was the father of writer and journalist Constantin Parvulesco, who is said to have retired to a Romanian monastery in the Carpathian Mountains under the name Father Nikandros. He was the grandfather of Stanislas Parvulesco, one of the claimants to the “throne” of Araucanía and Patagonia.

== Political and geopolitical theses ==
Analyzing his articles in Primer Plano on the Nouvelle Vague, the academic Hélène Liogier states that he “defends the virtues of order dictated by the papacy and monarchy,” is “in favor of a nationalism with European borders,” “praises the action of violence,” stigmatizes Enlightenment philosophers and Jean-Paul Sartre, condemns the “decadence of the capitalist and liberal bourgeoisie,” shows “exacerbated anti-communism and a trace of antisemitism,” and is “convinced of the existence of a conspiracy orchestrated by subversive forces”. He admired Pierre Drieu la Rochelle, whom he regarded as a true messiah, and lamented Nazi Germany’s defeat at the end of the Second World War. He was also deeply influenced by postmodernism.

He defended the construction of Eurasia as a “site of dialectical confrontation between the United States and the Soviet Union,” leading to the “final assumption of the whole toward a new unity of civilization [within] a single community of civilization, being, and destiny.” Historian Nicolas Lebourg interprets this as “a geopolitical-esoteric reformulation of nationalist-European theses on the white world, and a prefiguration of end-of-century theses on the new Eurasian-American entente known as the ‘Septentrion’”. In opposition to American imperialism, he asserted that the USSR would save the white race.

After the dissolution of the USSR, he advocated a “great Eurasian pan-European empire” uniting “Western Europe and Eastern Europe, Russia and Greater Siberia, India and Japan”, against the United Kingdom and the United States. He described Vladimir Putin as “a terrestrial representation of Christ Pantocrator,” preparing the advent of the “Eurasian Empire of the End”. Nicolas Lebourg emphasizes that “while the French far-right continued to think through the filter of the Cold War, Parvulesco revived the theme of the Paris–Berlin–Moscow axis, a subject of reflection in French diplomacy for over a century”.

According to Lebourg, Jean Parvulesco “was undoubtedly one of the first authors to introduce Mackinder into the French nationalist milieu, in a journal he edited with Yves Bataille”. He was the translator of the first texts of Francis Parker Yockey and one of the openly acknowledged inspirations of the Russian ideologue Alexander Dugin. Through Dugin, who was his friend and disciple, Jean Parvulesco influenced the political life in Russia, contributing to the establishment of the youth movement Nashi.

Lebourg concludes that “Parvulesco was an international transmitter of marginal ideas; his legacy is that of a name turned into a password—highly specific, but contributing to a transnational political imagination”.

== Bibliography ==
- The Merciful Crown of Tantra ("La Miséricordieuse Couronne du Tantra", 1978)
- Imperium ("Imperium", 1980)
- Treatise on Falconry ("Traité de la chasse au faucon", 1984)
- Diana Before the Gates of Memphis ("Diane devant les portes de Memphis", 1986)
- The Prophetic Spiral ("La Spirale prophétique", 1986)
- The Portuguese Servant ("La Servante Portugaise", 1987)
- The Mantle of Ice ("Le Manteau de glace", 1987)
- The Red Sun of Raymond Abellio ("Le Soleil rouge de Raymond Abellio", 1987)
- India ("India", 1988)
- The Mysteries of Villa Atlantis ("Les Mystères de la Villa Atlantis", 1990)
- Easter Island Journal ("Journal de l'Île de Pâques", 1990)
- The Star of the Invisible Empire ("L'Étoile de l'Empire invisible", 1994)
- The Geopolitical Foundations of Grand Gaullism ("Les Fondements géopolitiques du grand gaullisme", 1995)
- Secret Report to the Nunciature ("Rapport secret à la nonciature", 1995)
- The Ford of the She-Wolves ("Le Gué des louves", 1995)
- The Return of the Great Times ("Le Retour des Grands Temps", 1997)
- Versailles ("Versailles", 1998)
- The Conspiracy of the Polar Nuptials ("La Conspiration des noces polaires", 1998)
- A Masked Ball in Geneva ("Un bal masqué à Genève", 1999)
- Rendezvous at the Lake Manor ("Rendez-vous au Manoir du Lac", 2000)
- The Face of the Abysses ("Le Visage des abîmes", 2001)
- The Pyramid of Embers ("La Pyramide des braises", 2001)
- The Strategy of Darkness ("La Stratégie des ténèbres", 2003)
- Approaching the Junction of Venus ("En approchant la jonction de Vénus", 2004)
- Secret Mission to Baghdad ("Mission secrète à Bagdad", 2004)
- A Transcendental Strategy for "Greater Europe" ("Une stratégie transcendantale pour la « Grande Europe »", 2004)
- Vladimir Putin and Eurasia ("Vladimir Poutine et l'Eurasie", 2005)
- Investing in History. Regarding Michel d'Urance, "Milestones for a Rebel Ethic" ("Investir l'histoire. Au sujet de Michel d'Urance, « Jalons pour une éthique rebelle »", 2005)
- The Chosen One of Jean-Paul Bourre's Red Serpent ("L'élu du serpent rouge de Jean-Paul Bourre", 2006)
- The Lost Path ("Le Sentier perdu", 2007)
- Henry Montaigu Clandestinely in Colchis ("Henry Montaigu clandestinement en Colchide", 2007)
- In the Forest of Fontainebleau ("Dans la forêt de Fontainebleau", 2007)
- The Strange Knut Hamsun ("L'Étrange Knut Hamsun", 2008)
- Five Secret Paths in the Night ("Cinq Chemins secrets dans la nuit", 2008)
- The Boreal Confirmation ("La Confirmation Boréale", 2010)
- A Return to Colchis ("Un retour en Colchide", 2010)
