= Prix Valery Larbaud =

The Prix Valery Larbaud is a French literary prize created in 1967, ten years after writer Valery Larbaud's death, by L'Association Internationale des Amis de Valery Larbaud, an organization dedicated to the promotion of his works. The prize is awarded to writers of books the jurists feel "that Larbaud would have loved". It is always awarded in Vichy on the last weekend in May.

== Prize winners ==
Winners:

- 1967 – Michel Dard, Mélusine
- 1968 – Robert Levesque, Les Bains d'Estramadure
- 1969 – Claude Roy, Le verbe Aimer et autres essais
- 1970 – Henri Thomas, La Relique
- 1971 – Guy Rohou, Le Bateau des Iles
- 1972 – J.M.G. Le Clézio and Frida Weissman for all their works
- 1973 – Georges Perros, Papiers collés I, II
- 1974 – Pierre Leyris, for translations of William Blake's works
- 1975 – Muriel Cerf, Le Diable vert
- 1976 – Marcel Thiry, Toi qui pâlis au nom de Vancouver
- 1977 – Jean Blot, Les Cosmopolites and Françoise Lioure
- 1978 – Philippe Jaccottet for all his works
- 1979 – Georges Piroué, Feux et lieux
- 1980 – Paule Constant, Ouregano
- 1981 – Noël Devaulx for all his works
- 1982 – Christian Giudicelli, Une affaire de famille
- 1983 – Jacques Réda for all his works
- 1984 – Hubert Nyssen for all his works
- 1985 – Jean Lescure and Bernard Delvaille
- 1986 – René de Ceccatty, L'Or et la Poussière
- 1987 – Emmanuel Carrère, Le Détroit de Behring
- 1988 – Jean-Marie Laclavetine, Donnafugata
- 1989 – Jean Rolin, La ligne de front
- 1990 – Frédéric Jacques Temple, Anthologie Personnelles
- 1991 – Frédéric Vitoux, Sérénissime
- 1992 – Nicolas Bréhal, Sonate au Clair de Lune
- 1993 – Olivier Germain-Thomas, Au cœur de l'enfance
- 1994 – Jean-Noël Pancrazi, Le Silence des Passions
- 1995 – Alain Blottière, L'Enchantement
- 1996 – François Bott, Radiguet
- 1997 – Jean-Paul Enthoven, Les enfants de Saturne
- 1998 – Gérard Macé, Colportage I et II
- 1999 – Gilles Leroy, Machines à sous
- 2000 – Guy Goffette, Partance et autres lieux
- 2002 – Jean-Claude Pirotte, Ange Vincent
- 2003 – Georges-Olivier Chateaureynaud, Au fond du Paradis
- 2004 – Jean-Bertrand Pontalis, La Traversée des ombres
- 2005 – Christine Jordis, Une passion excentrique : visites anglaises
- 2006 – Pierre Jourde, Festins secrets
- 2007 – Vincent Delecroix, Ce qui est perdu
- 2008 – Thomas B. Reverdy, Les derniers feux
- 2009 – Éditions Michel Lafon, Une vie de Pierre Ménard
- 2010 – Cloé Korman, Les Hommes-couleurs (Le Seuil)
- 2011 – Jérôme Ferrari, Où j'ai laissé mon âme (Actes Sud)
- 2012 – Shumona Sinha, Assommons les pauvres! (L'Olivier)
- 2013 – Éric Vuillard, Congo et La Bataille d'Occident (Actes Sud)
- 2014 – Frédéric Verger, Arden, Gallimard
- 2015 – Luba Jurgenson, Au lieu du péril, Verdier
- 2016 – Hédi Kaddour, Les Prépondérants, Gallimard.
- 2017 – Jean-Baptiste Del Amo, Règne animal, Gallimard
- 2018 – Maud Simonnot, La Nuit pour adresse, Gallimard
- 2019 – Anton Beraber, La Grande Idée, Gallimard
- 2020 – Jacques Drillon, Cadence, Gallimard
