= Maud Simonnot =

French writer and editor

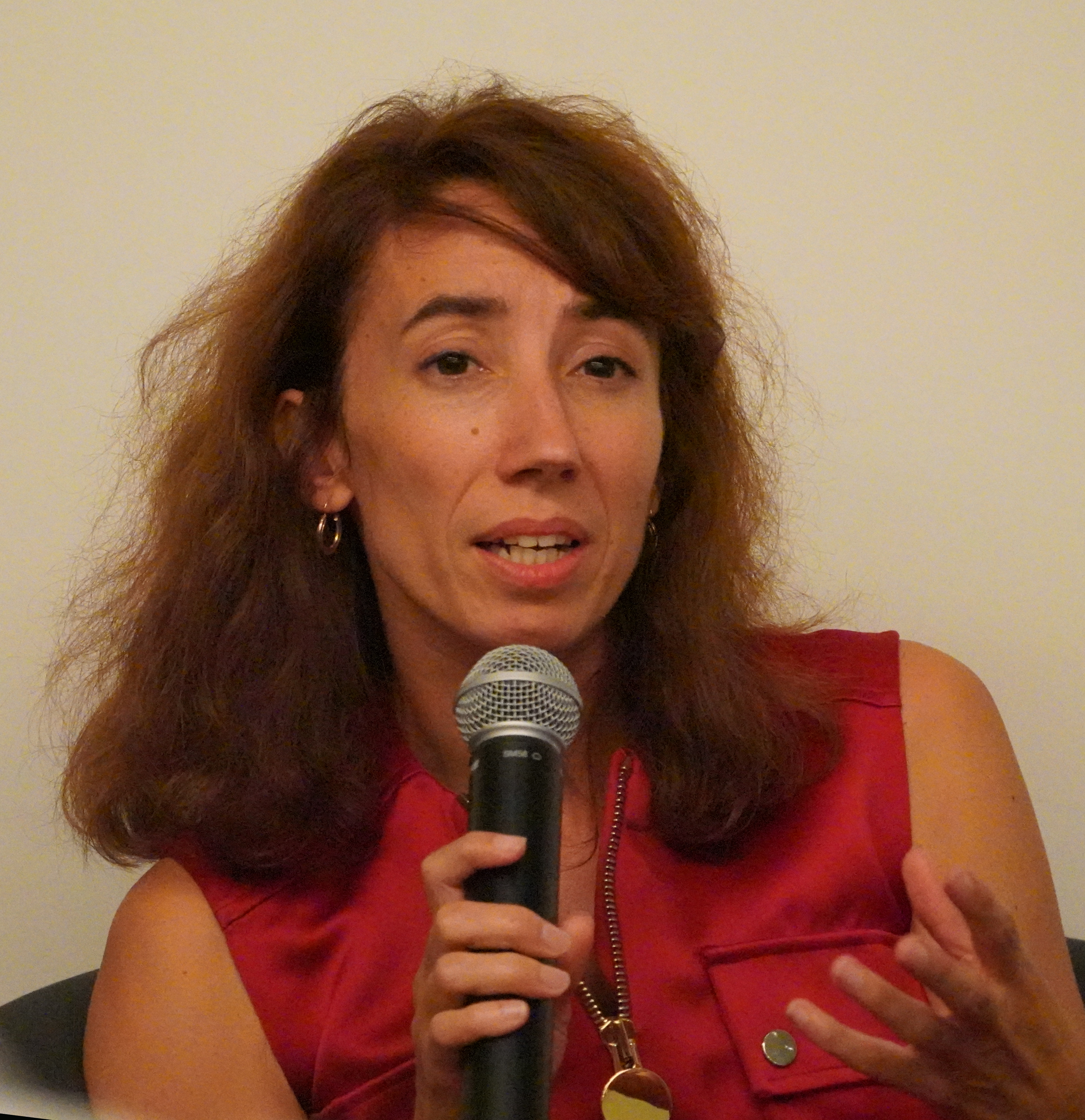
Maud Simonnot (2022)

Maud Simonnot (French: [mod simɔno]; born 1979) is a French writer and editor.

== Biography ==
She was born in Semur-en-Auxois in Bourgogne-Franche-Comté. She holds a BA in art history and an MA in Publishing from Paris-Sorbonne University, as well as a PhD in Literature specializing in the history of publishing.

Appointed as an editor for the Collection Blanche at Gallimard in 2012, she is also a member of the Gallimard Editions' Reading Committee.

In June 2023, she left Gallimard to join Éditions du Seuil. She became the director of French fiction.

At the beginning of 2025, she launched a new collection, Le Bar de la Sirène.

== Publications ==
She is the author of several acclaimed books, including works of fiction and non-fiction.

- La Nuit pour adresse (Gallimard, 2017) - a life of the publisher Robert McAlmon, winner of the Prix Valery Larbaud
- L'Enfant céleste (novel), nominated for the Prix Goncourt des lycéens 2020
- L'Heure des oiseaux (novel), winner of the EU Prize for Literature.
