= Salim Bachi =

Algerian novelist

Salim Bachi (born 1971, Algiers) is an Algerian novelist who grew up in Annaba, eastern Algeria. After a one-year stay in Paris in 1995, he returned there in 1997 to study literature. A pensioner at the French Academy in Rome in 2005, he now lives and works in Paris.

== Biography ==
Born in 1971 in Algiers, he studied literature in Paris at the Sorbonne and in 2001 published his first novel, Le Chien d'Ulysse, at Éditions Gallimard, hailed by critics and rewarded by the prix Goncourt du premier roman. In Algeria he became "the most talented writer of his generation", embarking on an ambitious literary work on Algeria, and its history, from colonization to the most recent dark episodes, marked by Islamist terrorism. His first two novels are part of a novel cycle developed from an imaginary city, the ancient Cyrtha.

After a year of residence at the prestigious Villa Médicis in Rome, his third novel, Tuez-les tous ("Kill them all"), marked a turning point in his inspiration with the choice of a complex and painful subject. He put himself in the shoes of a terrorist of September 11, dissecting the mechanisms of violence and alienation of terrorists. He pursues the novelistic study of the religious fact - a never innocent choice - with his last novel Le silence de Mahomet, published in September 2008 and selected for the Prix Goncourt, the Prix Goncourt des Lycéens and the Prix Renaudot. In this book, the Prophet becomes the subject of a novel where four of his closest faithful, remember the man he was, with his doubts and hopes, weaknesses and greatness. Bachi achieved critical and public success.

Salim Bachi travels through Europe and the Maghreb to defend a certain idea of literature, giving lectures to students, readers, universities and cultural institutes. A resident at the Académie de France à Rome in 2005, he now lives and works in Paris.

The éditions Gallimard published five of his novels in the Collection Blanche, Le Chien d'Ulysse, La Kahéna, Tuez-les tous, Le silence de Mahomet and Amours et aventures de Sindbad le Marin, which were hailed by critics and won several literary prizes. He also published a book of short stories about malvie ("bad life") in Algeria entitled Les douze contes de minuit at the same publisher and a narrative of travel, Autoportrait avec Grenade, at éditions du Rocher. His books won the prix Tropiques, the Prix littéraire de la vocation, the Goncourt scholarship for premier roman and the prince Pierre de Monaco de la découverte scholarship.

His novel Le silence de Mahomet presents a fictionalized and controversial vision of the Prophet Mohammed.

== Works ==
- 2001: Le Chien d'Ulysse, novel, éditions Gallimard, Prix littéraire de la Vocation / Prix Goncourt du Premier roman / Bourse de la découverte Prince Pierre de Monaco.
- 2003: La Kahéna, novel, Gallimard, Prix Tropiques 2004.
- 2005: Autoportrait avec Grenade, narration, éditions du Rocher
- 2006: Tuez-les tous, novel, Gallimard
- 2006: Les douze contes de minuit, short stories, Gallimard,
- 2008: Le silence de Mahomet, novel, Gallimard
- 2010: Amours et aventures de Sindbad le Marin, novel, Gallimard, translated by Sue Rose into English as The new adventures of Sinbad the sailor, Pushkin, 2012
- 2012: Moi, Khaled Kelkal, novel, éditions Grasset
- 2013: Le dernier été d'un jeune homme, novel, Flammarion
- 2014: Le Consul, novel, Gallimard
- 2017: Dieu, Allah, Moi et les Autres, novel, Gallimard

== Bibliography ==
- "Les 100 personnalités de la diaspora africaine : Salim Bachi", in Jeune Afrique, n°2536-2537, 16–29 August 2009, p. 47
