= Frédéric Schiffter =

French writer and philosopher (born 1956)

Frédéric Schiffter (born 1956) is a French writer and philosopher.

== Works ==
- 1985: Métaphysique du frimeur. Lettre sur l'élégance, Éditions du Milan
- 1997: On Dandyism and George Brummell (preface)
- 1999: Guy Debord, l'atrabilaire, PUF
- 2001: Sur le blabla et le chichi des philosophes, PUF, coll. « Perspectives critiques », ISBN 9782130521471
- 2002: Pensées d’un philosophe sous Prozac, Milan
- 2004: Le Plafond de Montaigne, Milan, coll. « Pause philo »
- 2004: Contre Debord, PUF, coll. « Perspectives critiques »
- 2005: Petite philosophie du surf, Milan
- 2006: Le Philosophe sans qualités, Flammarion
- 2007: Traité du cafard, Éditions Finitude
- 2008: Le Bluff éthique, Flammarion
- 2009: Délectations moroses, Le Dilettante
- 2010: Philosophie sentimentale, Flammarion, (Prix Décembre 2010).
- 2012: La Beauté, une éducation esthétique, Autrement
- 2013: Le Charme des penseurs tristes, Flammarion, ISBN 9782081310414
- 2014: Dictionnaire chic de philosophie, Écriture
- 2016: On ne meurt pas de chagrin, Flammarion, ISBN 9782081333024
