= Luc Lang =

French writer (born 1956)

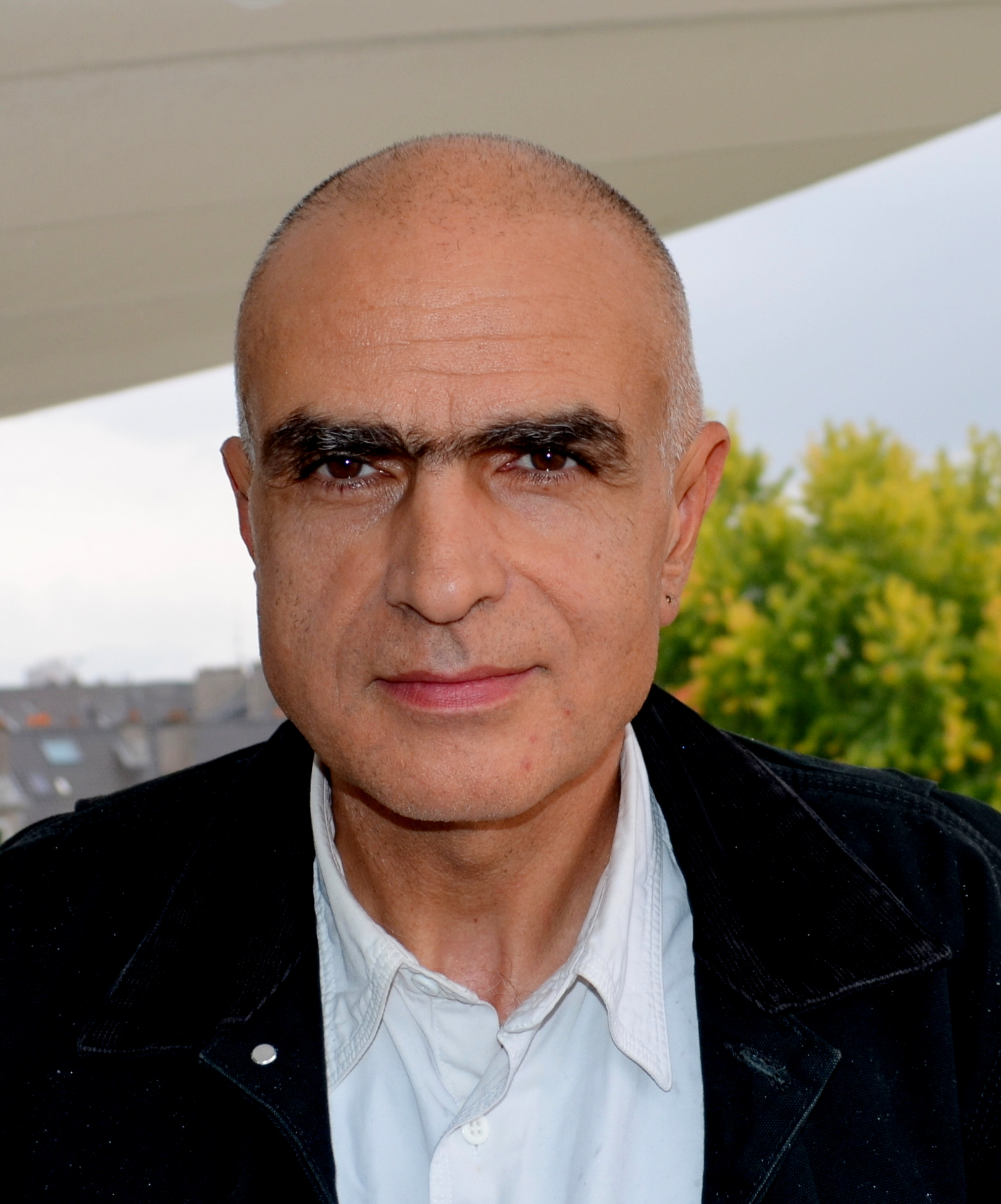
Luc Lang, October 2014

Luc Lang (born 1956 in Suresnes) is a French writer, born into a working-class family.

== Biography ==
Lang attended literary preparatory classes: Upper Letters (Hypokhâgne) at the lycée Honoré-de-Balzac, then Upper First (khâgne) at the lycée Jules Ferry and showed a passion for work, theory, considered from a lyrical point of view.

He teaches aesthetics at the École nationale supérieure d'arts de Paris-Cergy.

In 1995, he was a resident of the Villa Kujoyama.

He received the Prix Jean-Freustié in 1988 and the Prix Charles Oulmont in 1989 for Voyage sur la ligne d'horizon, as well as the Prix Goncourt des lycéens in 1998 for Mille six cents ventres.

== Works ==
- 1988: Voyage sur la ligne d’horizon, novel, Éditions Gallimard, ISBN 2070407683
  - Prix Jean-Freustié 1988., Prix Charles Oulmont 1989
- 1991: Liverpool marée haute, Gallimard, ISBN 207072400X
- 1995: Gerhard Richter, essay in collaboration with Jean-Philippe Antoine and Gertrud Koch. - Dis voir
- 1995: Furies, novel, Gallimard, ISBN 2070742733
- 1998: Mille six cents ventres, novel, Fayard, ISBN 2213601593
  - Prix Goncourt des lycéens 1998.
- 1999: Emmanuel Saulnier : principe transparent, essay in collaboration with Jean-Pierre Greff - Regard
- 2001: Les Indiens, novel, Stock, ISBN 2234053838
- 2002: Les Invisibles : 12 récits sur l'art contemporain, essay.- Regard, 2002
- 2003: 11 septembre Mon Amour, essay, Stock
- 2003: Notes pour une poétique du roman, essay, Amis d'inventaire-invention, series "Textes"
- 2006: La Fin des paysages, novel, Stock, ISBN 2070349225
- 2008: Cruels, 13, novel, Stock, ISBN 223406094X
- 2010: Esprit chien, novel, Stock, ISBN 2234059739
- 2011: Délit de fiction : la littérature, pourquoi ?, essay, Gallimard
- 2012: Mother, novel, Stock, ISBN 2234064651
- 2014: L’Autoroute, novel, Stock, ISBN 2234075246
- 2016: Au commencement du septième jour, novel, Stock, ISBN 2234081858
- 2019: La Tentation, novel, Stock
