= Mathieu Riboulet =

French writer and film director (1960–2018)

Mathieu Riboulet in Le Corps des Anges, film adaptation by Benoît Duvette

Mathieu Riboulet (13 June 1960 – 5 February 2018) was a French writer and film director.

== Biography ==
The son of architect Pierre Riboulet, Mathieu Riboulet studied cinema and modern letters at the New Sorbonne University.

He made several self-produced films within the framework of the Spy Films company established in the 1980s before devoting himself to writing. The main characters of Quelqu'un s'approche, of the novels Le Corps des anges and L'Amant des morts are young men attracted by men.

In November 2012, his novel Les Œuvres de miséricorde was awarded the prix Décembre.

In 2013, Riboulet became a Chevalier of the Ordre des Arts et des Lettres.

He died from cancer on 5 February 2018.

== Filmography ==
- 2007: Guillaume et les sortilèges by Pierre Léon : La Perfection faite Homme.

== Works ==
- 1996: Un sentiment océanique, Maurice Nadeau
- 1999: Mère Biscuit, Maurice Nadeau
- 2000: Quelqu'un s'approche, Maurice Nadeau
- 2003: Le Regard de la source, Maurice Nadeau
- 2004: Les Âmes inachevées, Éditions Gallimard, series "Haute enfance"
- 2005: Le Corps des anges, Gallimard
- 2006: Deux larmes dans un peu d'eau, Gallimard, series "L'un et l'autre"
- 2008: L'Amant des morts, Verdier
- 2010: Avec Bastien, Éditions Verdier
- 2012: Les Œuvres de miséricorde, Verdier - Prix Décembre
- 2014: (with Véronique Aubouy) À la lecture, Grasset
- 2015: (with Patrick Boucheron) Prendre dates. Paris, 6 janvier - 14 janvier 2015, Verdier
- 2015: Lisières du corps, Verdier
- 2015: Entre les deux il n’y a rien, Verdier
- 2016: Or, il parlait du sanctuaire de son corps, Les Inaperçus

== Honours and prizes ==
Mathieu Riboulet was awarded several prizes:

- Prix Thyde Monnier de la SGDL 2008 for L’Amant des morts
- Prix de l’Estuaire 2009 for L’Amant des morts
- Prix Décembre 2012 for Les Œuvres de miséricorde
