= Émilie de Turckheim =

French writer

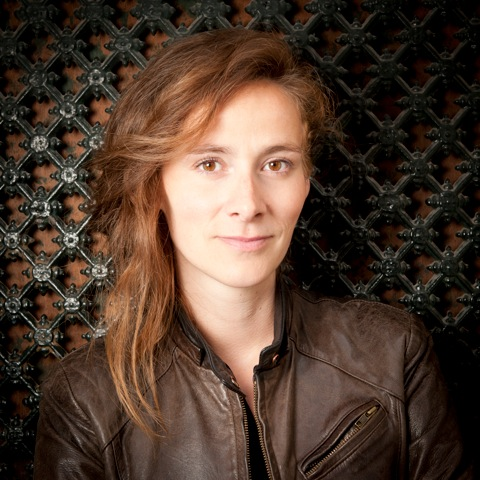
Émilie de Turckheim in 2012.

Émilie de Turckheim (born 5 October 1980 in Lyon) is a French writer. She is a cousin of actress Charlotte de Turckheim.

== Biography ==
After a license in French law and Anglo-American law, Émilie de Turckheim entered Sciences Po, then studied sociology.

In 2002, she joined the Groupement étudiant national d'enseignement aux personnes incarcérées (GENEPI) and teaches French and English in prison. Since 2004, she is a prison visitor at the Fresnes Prison.

At 24, she published her first novel, Les Amants terrestres, at éditions Le Cherche midi. She was awarded the Prix littéraire de la vocation in 2009 for Chute libre and the Prix Bel-Ami in 2012 for Héloïse est chauve. Le Joli mois de Mai was translated into German at Klaus Wagenbach.

Emilie de Turckheim is a model for painters and sculptors, an experience she recounts in La Femme à modeler. published in 2012

In April 2013, she published Jules et César and Mamie Antoinette at the publishing house "Naïve" of which she is director of collection.

She received the Prix Roger Nimier in 2015 for La Disparition du nombril.

== Publications ==
=== Novels ===
- 2005: Les Amants terrestres, Le Cherche Midi, ISBN 2749104262
- 2007: Chute libre, Le Rocher, ISBN 2268063178 (Prix littéraire de la vocation 2009)
- 2008: Les Pendus, Ramsay, ISBN 2841149595
- 2010: Le Joli mois de mai, Héloïse d'Ormesson, ISBN 2350871452
- 2012: Héloïse est chauve, Héloïse d'Ormesson, ISBN 2350871851 (Prix Bel-Ami 2012)
- 2013: Une sainte, Héloïse d'Ormesson, ISBN 2350871851
- 2014: La Disparition du nombril, Héloïse d'Ormesson, ISBN 978-2350872889 (Prix Roger Nimier 2015)
- 2015: Popcorn Melody, Héloïse d'Ormesson, ISBN 978-2350873282

=== Narrative ===
- 2012: La Femme à modeler, Naïve, (ISBN 2-35021-283-1)
- 2018: Le Prince à la petite tasse, Calmann-Lévy, ISBN 978-2-7021-5897-5

=== Albums for children ===
- 2013: Jules et César, Naïve, (ISBN 978-2-35021-306-4)
- 2013: Mamie Antoinette, Naïve, (ISBN 978-2-35021-296-8)
