= Jean-Noël Pancrazi =

French author

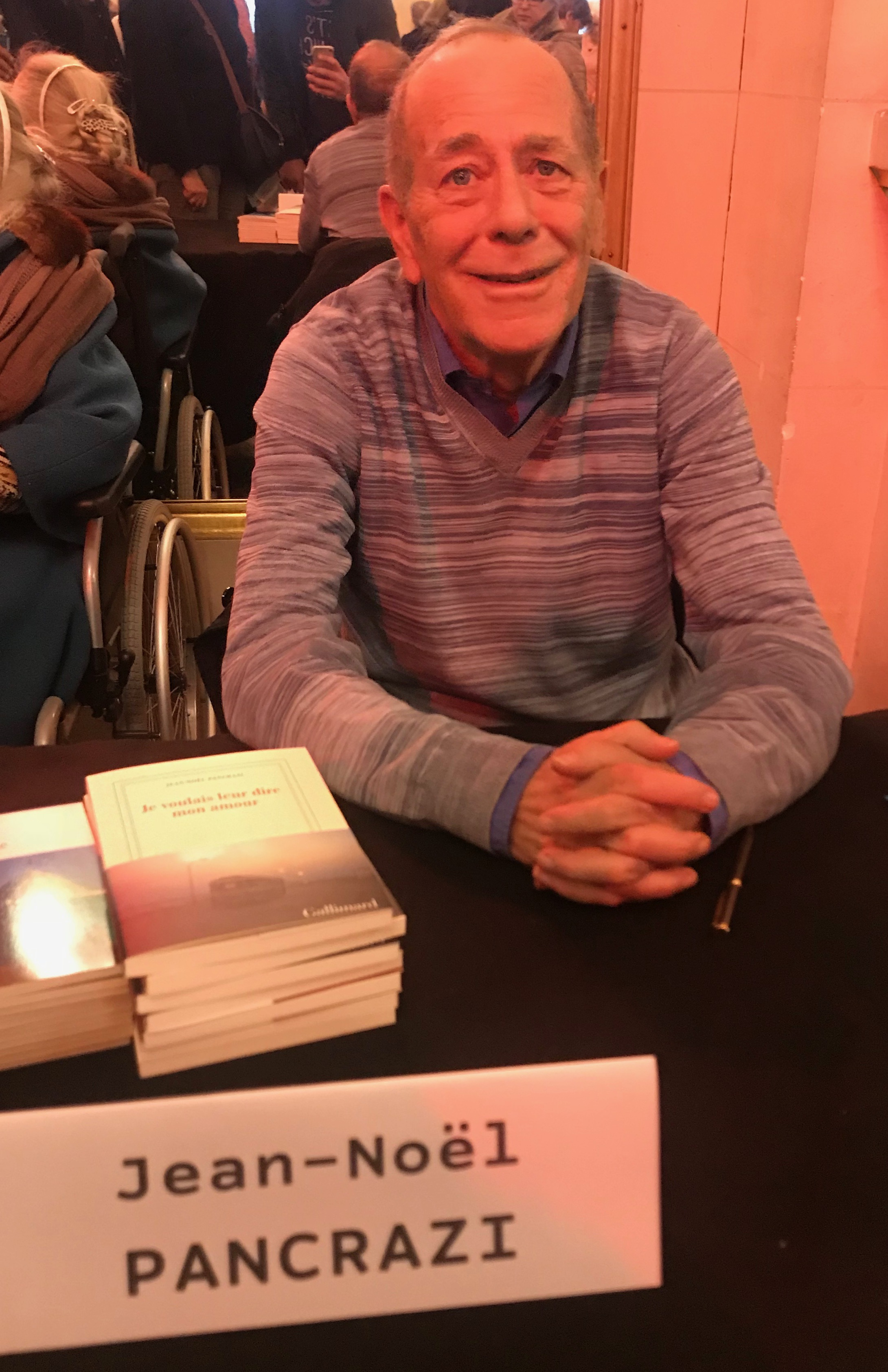
- Jean-Noël Pancrazi, Maghreb-Orient des Livres 2018
- Born: Sétif, Algeria
- Education: Lycée Louis-le-Grand; Sorbonne
- Occupation: Writer
- Writing career
- Language: French
- Years active: 1973–present
- Notable awards: Prix Médicis (1990); Prix du Livre Inter (1995); Grand prix du roman de l'Académie française (2003); Prix Méditerranée (2012); Chevalier de la Légion d'honneur (2013)

Jean-Noël Pancrazi is a French author.

== Biography ==
=== Early years ===
Jean-Noël Pancrazi spent the first ten years of his life in Algeria with his parents and his sister. His childhood years during the Algerian War had a significant influence on his literary work.

He arrived in France in 1962 and went to secondary school in Perpignan, his mother's birthplace. He went to Paris to study at the famous Lycée Louis-le-Grand then studied literature at the Sorbonne. In 1972 he received a degree in French Language and Literature. His first published work was an essay on Mallarmé published in 1973. During the 1970s, he worked as a French professor at a high school in Massy.

=== Literary career ===
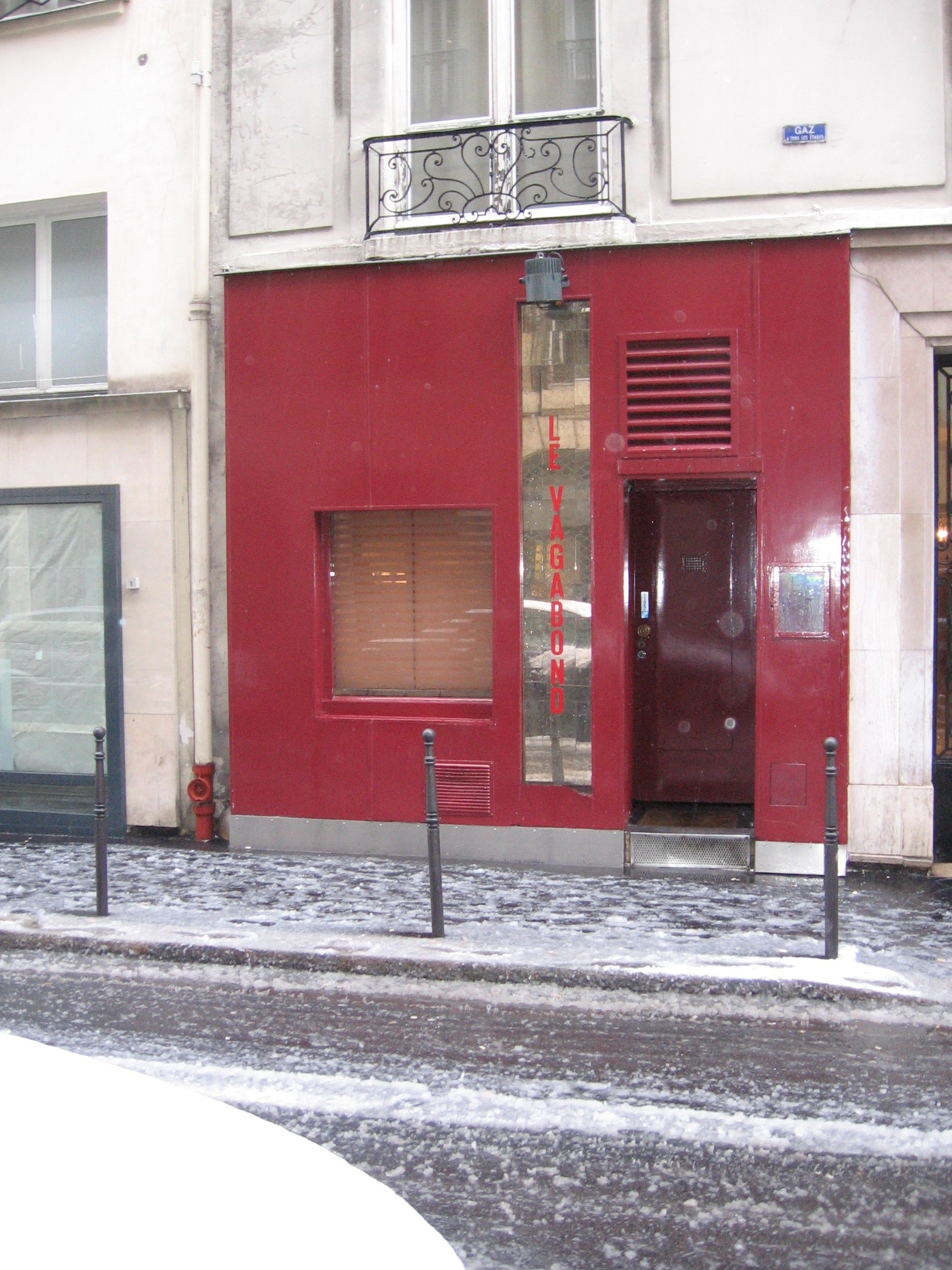
Le Vagabond, former gay bar, rue Thérèse in Paris.

His first novel, La Mémoire brûlée came out in 1979 published by Éditions du Seuil. He then wrote Lalibela ou la mort nomade (1981), L'Heure des adieux (1985) and Le Passage des princes (1988).

His following novel, Les Quartiers d'hiver was published in 1990 by Gallimard: the backdrop is « le Vagabond », a gay bar in Paris, at the start of the AIDS epidemic. The novel received the prix Médicis. Pancrazi continued his exploration of nightlife culture with his novel Le Silence des passions (1994) which received the prix Valery Larbaud.

He came back to his childhood in Batna, Algeria, at the time when the country toppled into war in his novel Madame Arnoul (1995), which traces the friendship between a young boy and his Alsatian neighbor – which the narrator considers like another mother – considered "an ally of the Arabs" because she protected a young Algerian girl against an assault by a French soldier, she was subsequently "punished" for this. Madame Arnoul received three awards: the prix du Livre Inter, the prix Maurice-Genevoix, and the prix Albert-Camus.

He pays homage to his father, who lived in Corsica at the end of his life, in the novel Long séjour (1998, which received the award Jean Freustié), then to his mother in the novel Renée Camps (2001). These three books compose "a trilogy of family memories".

In Tout est passé si vite (2003, which received the Grand prix du roman de l'Académie française), he paints the portrait of a close friend who is an editor and writer who is diagnosed with cancer.

His travels to Haiti and the Dominican Republic inspired two novels: Les Dollars des sables (2006), and Montecristi (2009), in which he uncovers an ecological scandal.

In La Montagne (2012), Jean-Noël Pancrazi confronts a memory that he has kept secret for many years: the death of six young childhood friends, assassinated on a mountain during the Algerian war. The text received the prix Méditerranée, Marcel-Pagnol, and Prix François Mauriac.

In Indétectable, a novel published in 2014 (Gallimard), he tells the story of Mady, an illegal immigrant from Mali living in Paris for ten years.

Jean-Noël Pancrazi is also the author of Corse (2000), with Raymond Depardon.

He received the distinguished award Société des gens de lettres (SGDL) for his body of work.

Since 1999, he has been a member of the jury for the Prix Renaudot.

Territoires Intimes, a documentary film on Jean-Noël Pancrazi, came out in 2013 (Renaud Donche, director, France 3 – Corsica, September 2013).

Jean-Noël Pancrazi was nominated "chevalier dans l'Ordre du Mérite" and "chevalier de la Légion d'Honneur".

== Works ==
- Mallarmé, essay, Hatier, 1973
- La Mémoire brûlée, novel, Le Seuil, 1979
- Lalibela ou la mort nomade, novel, Ramsay, 1981
- L'Heure des adieux, novel, Le Seuil, 1985
- Le Passage des princes, novel, Ramsay, 1988
- Les Quartiers d'hiver, novel, Gallimard, 1990, prix Médicis
- Le Silence des passions, novel, Gallimard, 1994, prix Valery-Larbaud
- Madame Arnoul, narrative, Gallimard, 1995, prix Maurice-Genevoix, prix Albert-Camus, prix du Livre Inter
- Long séjour, narrative, Gallimard, 1998, prix Jean-Freustié 1998
- Corse (Le Seuil, 2000) in collaboration with the photographer Raymond Depardon : text on Corsica and his father (following Long séjour).
- Renée Camps, narrative, Gallimard, 2001
- Tout est passé si vite, novel, Gallimard, 2003, grand prix du roman de l'Académie française
- Les Dollars des sables, novel, Gallimard, 2006, adapted for cinema (2015) by Laura Amelia Guzmán and Israel Cárdenas, with the American actress Géraldine Chaplin
- Montecristi, novel, Gallimard, 2009
- La Montagne, narrative, Gallimard, 2012, prix Marcel-Pagnol, prix Méditerranée, Prix François Mauriac
- Indétectable, novel, Gallimard, 2014
- Je voulais leur dire mon amour, novel, Gallimard, 2017
- Les années manquantes, novel, Gallimard, 2022

== Awards ==
- Prix Médicis for Les Quartiers d'hiver, novel, Paris, Gallimard, 1990
- Prix Valery-Larbaud for Le Silence des passions, novel, Paris, Gallimard, 1994
- Prix du Livre Inter, Prix Maurice Genevoix, and Prix Albert Camus for Madame Arnoul, novel, Paris, Gallimard, 1995
- Prix Jean-Freustié for Long séjour, narrative, Paris, Gallimard, 1998
- Grand prix du roman de l'Académie française for Tout est passé si vite, novel, Paris, Gallimard, 2003
- Prix Marcel Pagnol, Prix Méditerranée, Prix François Mauriac for La Montagne, narrative, Paris, Gallimard, 2012
- Grand Prix de la Société des Gens de Lettres for his body of work, Paris, 2009
- Chevalier dans l'Ordre national du Mérite, France, 2006
- Chevalier de la Légion d'honneur, France, 2013
- Member of the jury for Prix Renaudot since 1999
