= Sylvie Caster =

French journalist and writer

Sylvie Caster (born 1952 in Arcachon, Gironde) is a French journalist and writer.

== Biography ==
After studying journalism and political science in Bordeaux, Sylvie Caster published numerous columns, notably in Charlie Hebdo from 1976 to 1981 at the time of Cavanna, Wolinski and Reiser, then in Le Canard enchaîné.

She entered Le Canard in 1983 where she hosted a column entitled "Calamity Caster", where she took an energetic position in a whole series of social debates. She was the first woman writer of Le Canard enchaîné since 1920. The arrival of this strong personality did not go unnoticed to the newspaper which, by tradition, is accompanied in the texts and also the drawings, with a smiling but real misogyny . She received the Mumm Prize in 1994.

Since its creation in 2008, she regularly collaborates with the magazine XXI, in which she draws a unique portrait of France today.

She is the author, among others, of five novels including Les Chênes verts and Dormir.

== Works ==
- 1980: Les Chênes verts, Le Livre de Poche, ISBN 225302869X
- 1982: La France fout la camp, recueil de chroniques parues dans Charlie Hebdo, éd. Trévise-BFB
- 1985: Nel est mort, Barrault Éditions, Le Livre de Poche, ISBN 2253038865
- 1991: Bel-Air, Éditions Grasset, ISBN 2253062383, Prix populiste et Prix des bouquinistes
- 1994: La bombe humaine, Arléa, ISBN 978-2869591820
- 1995: La Petite Sibérie, Grasset, ISBN 978-2253140825
- 2002: Dormir, Éditions Pauvert, ISBN 226613647X, Prix Jean-Freustié 2003.
- 2010: Ici-bas, coédition Les Arènes-XXI, ISBN 978-2352041047
- 2015: L'homme océan, Éditions du Seuil, series "Raconter la vie", ISBN 2370210796
