= Hédi Kaddour =

French poet & writer (born 1945)

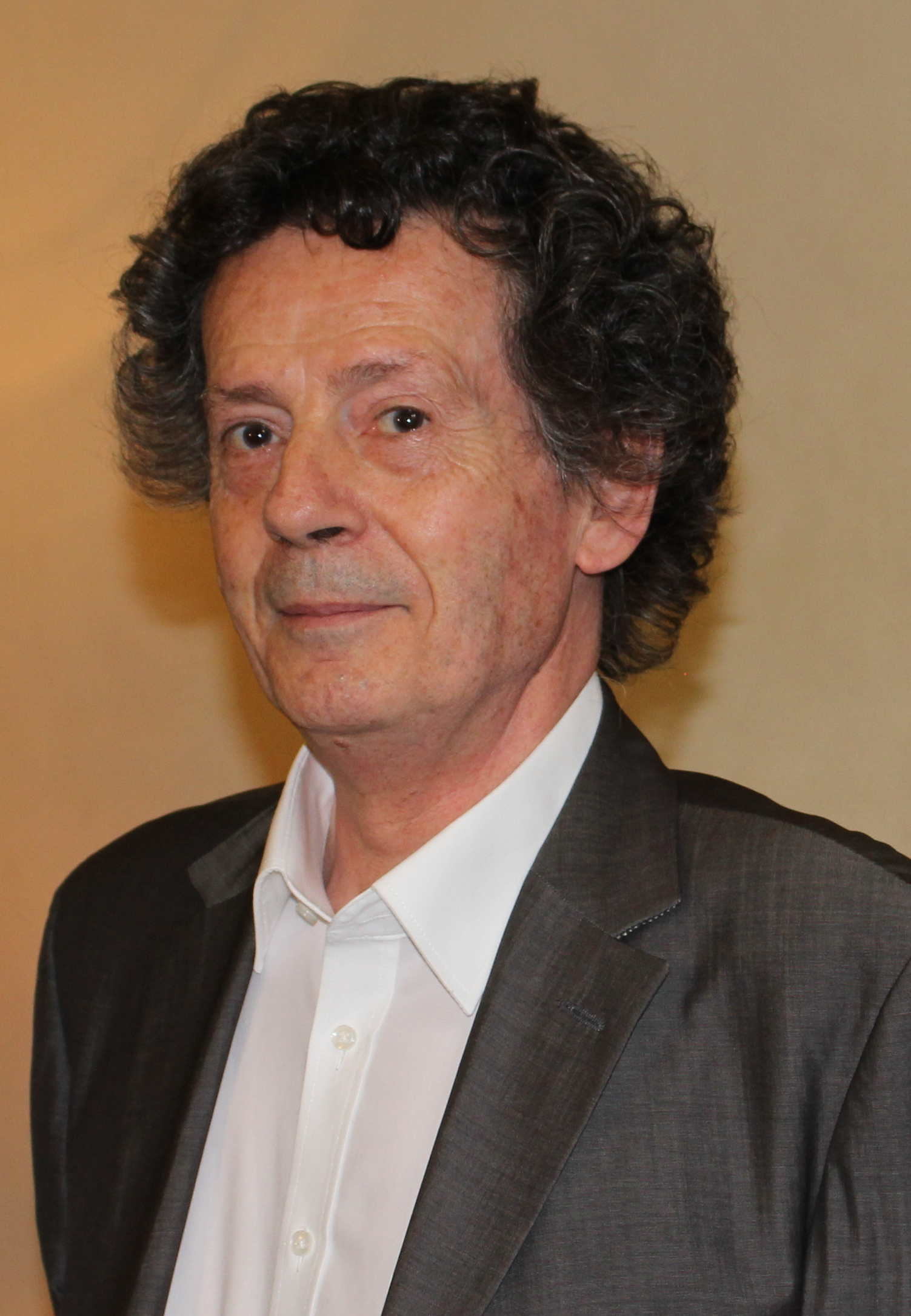
Hédi Kaddour in October 2015

Hédi Kaddour (born 1 July 1945 in Tunis) is a French poet and novelist.

== Biography ==
Hédi Kaddour was born of a Tunisian father and a French mother. Received 1st at the aggregation of modern letters, he is a translator of English, German and Arabic. He taught French literature and dramaturgy at the École normale supérieure de Lyon (ex ENS de Fontenay-Saint-Cloud) and journalistic writing at the Centre de formation des journalistes de Paris (CFJ). He is now a professor of French literature at the New York University in France. He also teaches the writing of reports at the École des métiers de l'information (EMI, Paris) and runs one of the writing workshops of the "NRF" at Éditions Gallimard.

Editor-in-Chief of the magazine Po&Sie , he sometimes gives literary columns to Le Monde des livres, Libération and Le Magazine Littéraire.

After several collections of poems published by Editions Gallimard, he published Waltenberg in 2005, a novel that plunges into the history of men and letters of the twentieth century. This book, which mixes adventure and espionage, also houses a sentimental plot tinged with melancholy. Hailed by critics, it received the prix Goncourt du premier roman and the prix du premier roman, and was ranked "Best French novel of the year 2005" by magazine Lire.

A collection of studies on this novel appeared under the title Études sur Waltenberg, roman de Hédi Kaddour, at editions Act Mem (series "Lire Aujourd'hui") in 2007. The novel Waltenberg was translated into English by David Coward at Random House in 2007 and in German by Grete Osterwald in 2009 by Eichborn Verlag, Frankfurt am Main.

In January 2010, Hédi Kaddour published two new books: Savoir-vivre, novel, Gallimard, series "Blanche" and "Folio". A German translation appeared by Eichborn Verlag in April 2011. Les Pierres qui montent, notes et croquis de l'année 2008, Gallimard, series "Blanche".

In 2015, Hédi Kaddour received the Prix Jean-Freustié for his novel Les Prépondérants, as well as the Grand Prix du roman de l'Académie française. He was also among the four finalists of the Prix Goncourt which was eventually awarded to Leïla Slimani. In March 2016, he also received the Prix Valery Larbaud for that novel.

Three of his poems were put into music in 1999 for voice and piano by composer Karol Beffa in the series Six Mélodies (Le Vin nouveau, Théâtre du vide and La Jalousie); These pieces were subsequently transcribed for violin (or viola) and piano in 2008 (Cinq Pièces).

== Works ==
=== Novels ===
- 2005: Waltenberg. Blanche. Paris: Éditions Gallimard. 2005. p. 711. ISBN 9782070773961. in German: Waltenberg, translated by Grete Osterwald, Verlag Eichborn, Frankfurt am Main 2009 ISBN 978-3821857909, Prix Goncourt du premier roman
- 2010: Savoir-vivre. Blanche. Paris: Éditions Gallimard. 2010. pp. 197. ISBN 9782070127764.
- 2015: Les Prépondérants, Éditions Gallimard, series "Blanche", 464 p. ISBN 978-2-07-014991-9 - Prix Jean-Freustié 2015 - Grand prix du roman de l'Académie française 2015. Prix Littéraire Valery Larbaud 2016.
- 2021: La Nuit des orateurs, Éditions Gallimard

=== Poetry ===
- 1987: Le Chardon mauve. Pantin, France: Le Temps des cerises. p. 156. ISBN 9782841093953.
- 1989: La fin des vendanges. Blanche. Paris: Éditions Gallimard. 1989. p. 100. ISBN 978-2070716111.
- 1992: La chaise vide. Les solitudes. Sens, France: Éditions Obsidiane. 1992. p. 36. ISBN 9782904469770.
- 1994: Jamais une ombre simple. Blanche. Paris: Éditions Gallimard. 1994. p. 107. ISBN 9782070736102.
- 1997: Aborder la poésie. Mémo. Paris: Éditions du Seuil. 1997. p. 90. ISBN 9782020229616.
- 1994: L'Émotion impossible. Cognac, France: Les Éditions Le Temps qu'il fait. 1994. p. 116. ISBN 9782868532008.
- 2000: Passage au Luxembourg. Blanche. Paris: Éditions Gallimard. 2000. p. 108. ISBN 9782070758180.

=== Diary ===
- 2010: Les pierres qui montent; Notes et croquis de l'année 2008. Blanche. Paris: Éditions Gallimard. 2010. p. 376. ISBN 9782070127733.

=== Other ===
- 2007: Inventer sa phrase. Métier journaliste. Paris: Éditions Victoires. 2007. p. 119. ISBN 9782351130230.
- 2009: Littérature et Saveur, mélanges offerts à Jean Goldzink. Paris: Éditions Le Manuscrit. 2009. p. 453. ISBN 9782304024005.

=== Articles online ===
- "Un théâtre mauvais genre. En attendant Godot et Fin de partie" in Les Temps modernes, ISSN 0040-3075, n°604, June 1999, p. 119-130

=== In collaboration ===
- 2006: Michel Deguy; Robert Davreu [in French]; Hédi Kaddour (2001). Des poètes français contemporains. Paris: Éditions ADPF. p. 130. ISBN 9782911127830.
- 2007: Michel Butor; Chloé Delaume; Pierrette Fleutiaux; Hédi Kaddour (2007). Neuf leçons de littérature. Paris: Éditions Thierry Magnier. p. 187. ISBN 9782844205407.

== Bibliography ==
- 2007: Collective (2007). Études Sur Waltenberg, Roman de Hedi Kaddour. Chambéry, France: Éditions L'Act Mem. p. 312. ISBN 9782355130007. Articles by: Frédérique Aït-Touati – Didier Alexandre – Yves Balmer – Christian Biet – Anne-Lise Blanc – Claude Burgelin – Pierre Campion – Gabrielle Chamarat – Florence Chapiro – Pierre Daubigny – Robert Davreu – Jean-Yves Debreuille – Jean-Pierre Dupouy – Bernard Franco – Christian Garcin – Gérald Garutti – Brigitte Gauthier – Gérard Gengembre – Jean Goldzink – Francine Mazière – Claude Mouchard – Nathalie Piégay – Jean-Loup Rivière – Marianne Rubinstein – Martin Rueff – Tiphaine Samoyault - Guillaume Soulez – Muriel Stuckel – Lionel Verdier
- Roman Monde: Hédi Kaddour's Waltenberg. Bérengère Vachonfrance-Levet. Paradoxa vol.24: Espionage Fiction:The Seduction of Clandestinity. Pages 187-198. Collectif sous la direction de Robert L. Snyder. 2012.Vashon Island, WA 98070, États-Unis.

== Prizes ==
- 2005: Waltenberg, novel, Prix Goncourt du premier roman
- 2015: Les prépondérants, roman, Grand Prix du roman de l'Académie française, Prix Jean-Freustié, Prix Littéraire Valery Larbaud.
