= Prix de la Page 112 =

French literary award

The Prix de la page 112 is a French literary award created in 2012 by the French editor and literary critic Claire Debru.

== Purpose ==
The name and the purpose of this award was inspired by Woody Allen's film Hannah and Her Sisters. In the film, actor Michael Caine tells a woman that she reminds him of a love poem on page 112 of a book of poetry written by e e cummings. If an entire work is to be judged, this principle assumes that page 112 is an index of quality since the beginning and the end of the work are subjected to a greater amount of attention by authors and editors, whereas page 112 is the ventre mou or soft belly. Thus, the jury members first read this page to determine if a book should be read to qualify for the award.

== Laureates ==
- 2012 : La Recherche de la couleur by Jean-Marc Parisis
- 2013 : Les Evaporés by Thomas B. Reverdy
- 2014 : No award
- 2015 : Berezina by Sylvain Tesson
- 2016 : Basse Fidélité by Philippe Dumez
- 2017 : Sanglier by Dominique Rameau
- 2018 : La Dernière France by Jacques Jouet

== Notes and references ==
=== External links ===
- Official website
