= Shumona Sinha =

French writer

- সুমনা সিনহা
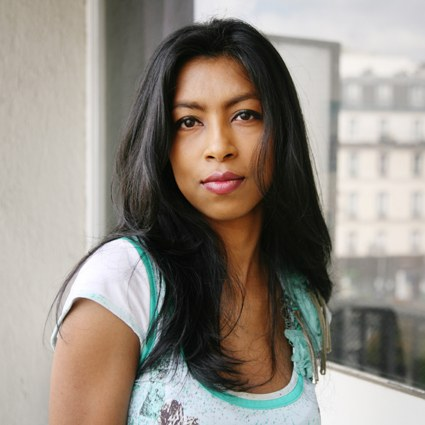
- Shumona Sinha
- Born: 27 June 1973 (age 53); Calcutta, West Bengal, India

Shumona Sinha (also spelled Sumana Sinha, Bengali: সুমনা সিনহা, born 27 June 1973) is an Indian-born naturalised French writer. She was born in Calcutta, West Bengal, India, and lives in France.

In her interviews for the French media, Shumona Sinha claims that her homeland is no longer India, nor even France, but the French language.

== Early life ==
Shumona Sinha was born in a Hindu middle-class family in Calcutta : her father was a professor of economics and her mother was a high school mathematics teacher. Her parents belonged to the scribal and landholding caste of Bengali Kayasthas with ancestors who were Zamindars.

As an adolescent, Shumona was an avid reader, surrounded by books bought by her parents or offered by her maternal aunt, Ratna Basu, a scholar and translator of German into sanscrit.

In 1990, she received Bengali's Best Young Poet Award.

== Studies ==
In 1995, at the age of 22, Shumona Sinha started learning French at Ramkrishna Mission School of Foreign Languages at Calcutta. She views her decision to study French as her personal post-colonial revolt against English, language of the former colonizers and the second official language of India.

In 1998, she studied political science and economy at the university of Calcutta. In 2001, she got a master's degree in French literature and linguistics from the Central Institute of English and Foreign Languages at Hyderabad

== Career ==
In 2001, she was recruited by the French embassy in India to become an English-language assistant teacher in a junior high school in Paris There, she gained an M-Phil in French language and literature from the Sorbonne University.

In 2008, she published her first novel Fenêtre sur l'abîme.

In the 2000s, she also translated and published several anthologies of Bengali and French poetry, together with her ex-husband, the writer Lionel Ray.

In 2011, her second novel, Assommons les pauvres !, was published at Éditions de l'Olivier, which won her the Prix Valery-Larbaud 2012 and the Prix Populiste in 2011; it was shortlisted for the Prix Renaudot. Assommons les pauvres! is characterized by a harsh, but multilayered poetical literary reckoning with France's asylum system.

The novel has become a part of scholarly programs to discuss the questions of identity, exile, writing as a woman, writing in a foreign language, the relationship between literature and politics, at the Notre Dame University in Chicago, a course conducted by Alison Rice, at the American University in Paris by Anne-Marie Picard and at Institut national des langues et civilisations orientales by Tirthankar Chanda. Assommons les pauvres was adapted by several theaters in Germany and in Austria, especially by Thalia Theater in Hambourg and the Freies Werkstatt theater in Cologne. The English translation of Assommons les pauvres was published by Les Fugitives, London in August 2022, and by Deep Vellum Publishers in the USA in August 2023.

In her third novel Calcutta, published in January 2014, Shumona Sinha goes down the memory lane of a Bengali family to describe the violent political history of West Bengal. The book was rewarded by the Grand Prix du Roman de la Société des gens de lettres and Prix du Rayonnement de la langue et de la littérature françaises of the Académie française. The English translation of Calcutta was published by SSP, Delhi, in November 2019.

Her fourth novel Apatride, published in January 2017, is a parallel portrait of two Bengali women, one living in a village near Calcutta, caught up in a peasant insurrection and a romantic misadventure with her cousin, causing her to perish; the other one living in Paris, in a fragmented post-CharlieHebdo society, where racism of all the colors prevails.

In Le testament russe, her fifth novel, published in March 2020 by Gallimard (Blanche), she describes the fascination of a young Bengali girl, Tania, for a Russian Jewish editor in 1920 who was the founder editor of Raduga Publishers.

In L'autre nom du bonheur était français, her sixth book, published in November 2022 by Gallimard (Blanche), she describes her journey from Bengali, her native language, to French, her language of love and création.

In Souvenirs de ces époques nues, her seventh novel, published in March 2024 by Gallimard (Blanche), she describes the soul searching of a French woman in an ashram in India, and the Hindu hegemony and political violence in current India.

Shumona Sinha' books have been translated into German, Italian, Hungarian, Arabic and English.

== Works ==
- Fenêtre sur l'abîme; 2008, Éditions de La Différence
- Assommons les pauvres !; 2011, Éditions de l'Olivier
- Calcutta, 2014; Éditions de l'Olivier
- Apatride, 2017; Éditions de l'Olivier
- Le Testament russe, 2020; Gallimard (Blanche)
- L'autre nom du bonheur était français, 2022; Gallimard (Blanche)
- Souvenirs de ces époques nues, 2024; Gallimard (Blanche)

== Award and distinctions ==
- 2012 : Prix Valery-Larbaud
- 2011 : Prix Eugène Dabit du roman populiste
- 2014 : Grand prix du roman de la Société des gens de lettres
- 2014 : Prix du rayonnement de la langue et de la littérature françaises de l'Académie française
- 2016 : International Literature Award
