= Frédéric Verger =

French writer (born 1959)

Frédéric Verger (15 March 1959, Montreuil-sous-Bois) is a French writer.

== Biography ==
The holder of an agrégation ès letters since 1986, Verger is a professor of French at the lycée d'Arsonval in Saint-Maur-des-Fossés.

He is also a chronicler for the Revue des deux Mondes (Review of the Two Worlds) literary magazine.

In 2013, Verger received the Liste Goncourt : le choix polonais prize, then in 2014 the prix Thyde Monnier de la Société des gens de lettres le prix Mémoire Albert Cohen, the Prix Goncourt du premier roman, as well as the Prix Valery Larbaud for his novel Arden, published by Éditions Gallimard.

== Work ==
- 2013: Arden, series "Blanche", Éditions Gallimard, ISBN 978-2-07-013973-6
