= Alain Blottière =

French writer

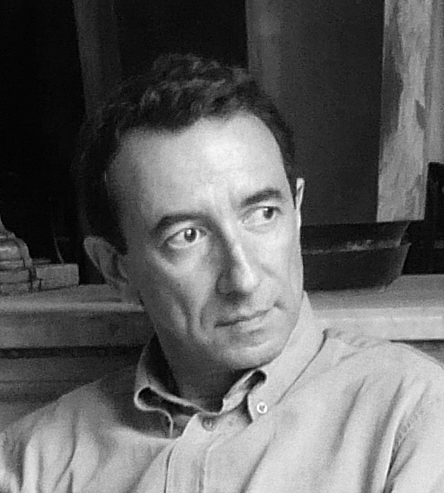
- Blottière in 2008
- Born: 1954 (age 71–72); Neuilly-sur-Seine, France
- Occupation: Writer
- Writing career
- Language: French

Alain Blottière (born 1954) is a French writer.

== Works ==
- 1980: Saad, novel, Éditions Gallimard, coll. « Le Chemin », Paris, ISBN 9782070210176. Prix littéraire de la vocation.
- 1985: Le Point d'eau, novel, Gallimard, ISBN 9782070703838
- 1990: Intérieur bleu, novel, Éditions Balland, ISBN 9782715807846
- 1992: L'Oasis: Siwa, tale, Quai Voltaire, ISBN 9782876531185
- 1995: L'Enchantement, novel, Calmann-Lévy, ISBN 2702123546; Prix Valery-Larbaud
- 1998: Si-Amonn, novel, Mercure de France, ISBN 2715220871
- 1999: Tableaux des oasis égyptiennes, tale, Arthaud, ISBN 9782700312416
- 2000: Petit dictionnaire des dieux égyptiens Zulma, ISBN 9782843040894.
- 2003: Un voyage en Égypte au temps des derniers rois, tale, Flammarion, ISBN 9782080107954.
- 2007: Comme une image, récit, in La Nouvelle Revue française n° 582, Gallimard, ISBN 2070785181
- 2008: Aimer encore l'Égypte, préface à Fils de roi, Portraits d'Égypte by Denis Dailleux, photographs, Gallimard, ISBN 9782070123148.
- 2009: Le Tombeau de Tommy, novel, Gallimard, ISBN 9782070729951; paperback edition: Folio (Gallimard) n° 5203, Paris, 2011 ISBN 9782070440436.
- 2012: Rêveurs, novel, Gallimard, ISBN 9782070138333
- 2012: Houdi, short story, Artist's book with five numbered copies, with illustrations by Jean-Pierre Thomas.
- 2013: Mon île au trésor - Dans les sables de Libye, tale, Arthaud, ISBN 2081297922
- 2016: Comment Baptiste est mort, novel, Gallimard, ISBN 9782070178650. Prix Mottart de l'Académie française, Prix Décembre 2016, Grand prix Jean Giono 2016.
- 2020: Azur noir, novel, Gallimard, ISBN 9782072879333. Prix Pierre Mac Orlan.
- 2026: Le ciel a disparu, novel, Gallimard, ISBN 9782073129918. Prix Transfuge du roman français.
