= Georges Piroué =

Swiss writer (1920–2005)

Georges Piroué (5 August 1920, La Chaux-de-Fonds – 7 January 2005, Dampierre-sur-Loire near Saumur age 84) was a Swiss writer.

== Biography ==
After studying literature and a doctorate at the University of Neuchâtel, Georges Piroué left for Paris.

After he published two collections of poetry, Nature sans rivage (1951) and Chansons à dire (1953), he turned to the writing of short stories.

He became a literary advisor and set up a translation department for the authors of Southern Italy and Sicily at the Éditions Denoël, which published almost all his texts from 1960 to 1985.

== Prizes ==
- 1966: Prix Charles Veillon
- 1979: Prix Littéraire Valery Larbaud for Feux et lieux

== Bibliography (selection) ==
=== Short stories ===
- 1961: Ariane, ma sanglante
- 1966: Ces Eaux qui ne vont nulle part
- 1969: La Façade et autres miroirs
- 1979: Feux et lieux
- 1989: Madame double étoile
- 1992: L'Herbe tendre

=== Novels ===
- 1962: Une manière de durer
- 1972: La vie supposée de Théodore Nèfle
- 1976: San Rocco et ses fêtes
- 1981: À sa seule gloire : fragments d’une autre vie

=== Essais ===
- 1960: Proust et la musique du devenir
- 1967: Pirandello
- 1985: Lui, Hugo
- 1997: Mémoires d’un lecteur heureux
