= Noël Devaulx =

French writer

René Forgeot (9 December 1905 in Brest – 9 June 1995 in Saint-Romain-de-Lerps) known in literature under the pseudonym Noël Devaulx, was a French novelist and short-story writer.

== Life ==
After having had to give up his maritime career for health reasons, and supported by Boris de Schloezer, René Forgeot graduated from the École Supérieure d'Électricité. The following are texts, haunted by the theme of blood, gas and deportations, which appear during the war, notably in the reviews of Pierre Seghers, Poésie, by Max-Pol Fouchet, Fontaine and René Tavernier, Confluences. In full German occupation of France, the author said that Le pressoir mystique could not be put into all hands: in fact, the collaborationist Pierre Drieu La Rochelle expressed some reservations. The whole situation set Noël Devaulx among the rank of the greatest. His first collection of short stories, L'Auberge Papillon was published by Éditions Gallimard in 1945. In 1948, Albert Béguin finally published in Neuchâtel, in his collection of "Cahiers du Rhône", Le pressoir mystique. From that moment, the narrator appeared both as a classical by style, by mastery and stripping of style, and as a fantastic, by his taste for the fabulous atmosphere and the perpetual presence of metaphysical or dreamlike suggestions: characters endowed with a "more than human nature" like La Dame de Murcie, whose eyes possess an enigmatic and irrefutable power.

Jean Paulhan, in his 1945 "Post-face", writes that it is "already very laudable to write parables": he wants to see in Noël Devaulx one of the storytellers capable of drawing the reader out of the "small world where we are enclosed, between German metaphysics and the American novel (who get along very well, who have concluded a sort of pact, no one knows why!). "Is this the double reason for his relegation?" "Theater d'ombres" According to the expression of H. Ronse (NRF, 2, 1967) but where the evident existence of these shadows is like hollow engraving of nostalgia for the spiritual and the sacred.

== Works ==
- 1945: L'Auberge Parpillon, short stories, post-face by Jean Paulhan, Éditions Gallimard
- 1948: Le Pressoir mystique, short stories, Neuchâtel, Éditions La Baconnière - Paris, Éditions du Seuil
- 1949: Compère, vous mentez!..., narrative, Gallimard, series "Métamorphoses"
- 1952: Sainte Barbegrise, narrative, Gallimard
- 1955: Bal chez Alféoni, tales, Gallimard
- 1961: La Dame de Murcie, Gallimard
- 1966: Frontières, Gallimard
- 1974: Avec vue sur la zone, Éditions José Corti (Prix des Critiques)
- 1977: Le Lézard d'immortalité, Éditions Gallimard (prix de la Nouvelle de l'Académie française)
- 1979: La Plume et la racine, short stories, Gallimard
- 1981: Le Manuscrit inachevé, Gallimard, Prix Valery Larbaud
- 1983: Le Vase de Gurgan, short stories, Gallimard
- 1985: Le Visiteur insolite, short stories, Gallimard
- 1986: Instruction civique, Gallimard
- 1989: Capricieuse Diane, short stories, Gallimard
- 1993: Mémoires du perroquet Papageno, Éditions Dumerchez
- 1994: Visite au palais pompéien, Gallimard

== Critical bibliography ==
- 1964: Évelyne Margerie, Les lieux du merveilleux et du fantastique dans l'œuvre de Noël Devaulx. thesis.
