= Cloé Korman =

French writer (born 1983)

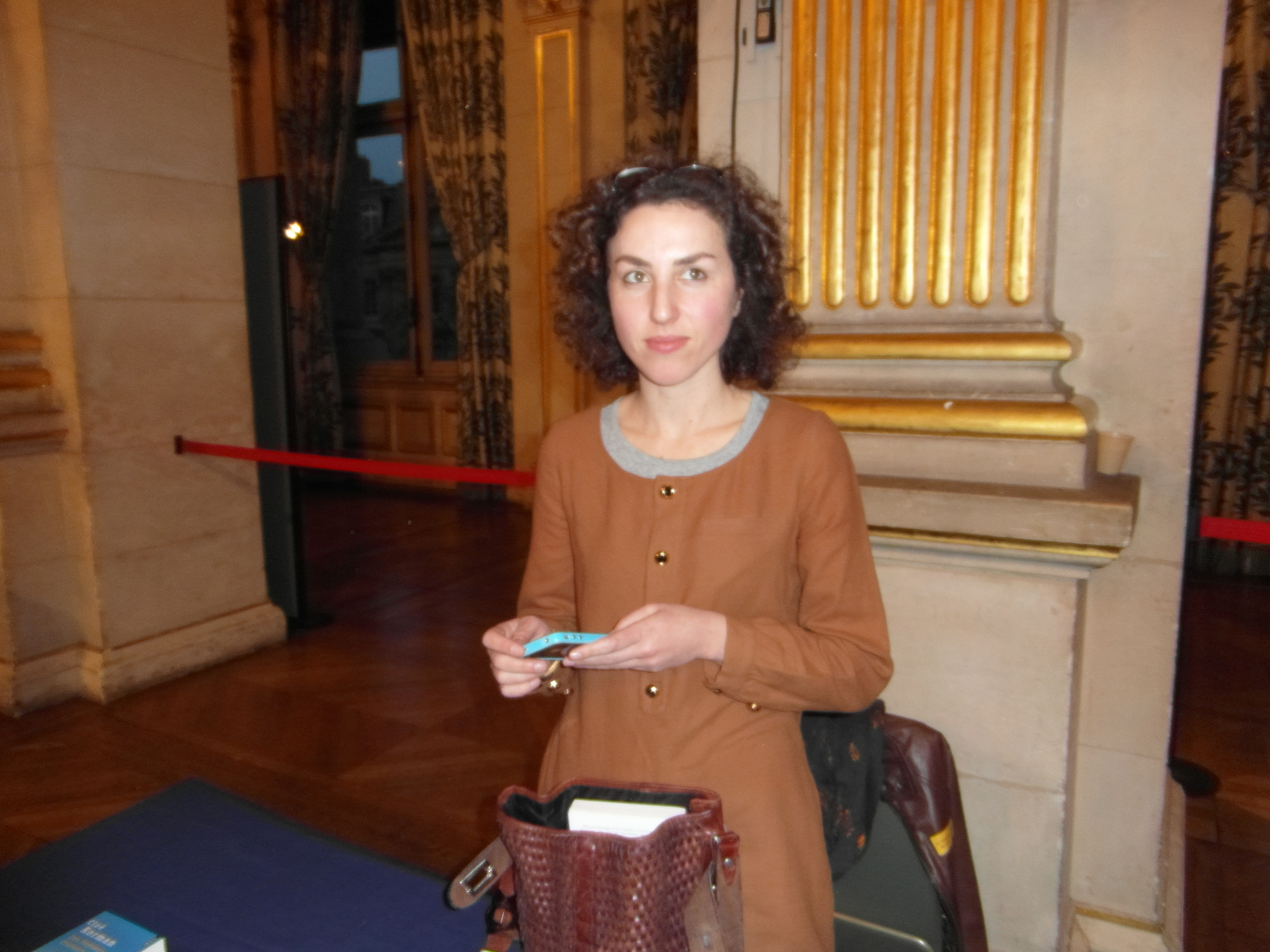
Cloé Korman in February 2014

Cloé Korman (born 1983 in Paris) is a French writer.

Cloé Korman studied Anglo-Saxon literature before settling for two years in New York. During trips in 2005, she discovered the west coast of the United States and Mexico that inspired her first novel Les Hommes-couleurs (2010) which earned her the Inter Book Prize and the Prix Littéraire Valery Larbaud.

== Work ==
- 2010: Les Hommes-couleurs, éditions du Seuil ISBN 978-2021001679
- 2013: Les Saisons de Louveplaine, Seuil, series "Cadre rouge", ISBN 978-2-02-112063-9
