= Muriel Cerf =

French writer (1950–2012)

- Born: 4 June 1950; Paris, France
- Died: 19 May 2012 (aged 61); Anet, France
- Education: Ecole du Louvre
- Occupations: Novelist, travel writer
- Writing career
- Period: 1974–2012
- Genres: Literary fiction, Travel writing, Erotic literature
- Notable work: L'Antivoyage (1974)

Muriel Cerf (4 June 1950 – 19 May 2012) was a French novelist and travel writer. She was born in Paris. After passing her Baccalauréat, she studied oriental art at the École du Louvre.

Her first book, L'Antivoyage, was inspired by her travels in Southeast Asia, and was a major critical success. She was awarded the Prix Littéraire Valery Larbaud in 1975 for Le Diable vert.

== Selected works ==
- L'Antivoyage (1974)
- Le Diable vert (1975)
- Les rois et les voleurs (1975)
- Marie Tiefenthaler (1982)
- Julia M. ou le Premier Regard (1991)
- La Petite Culotte (2005)

== Sources ==
- France, Peter (Ed.) (1995). The New Oxford Companion to Literature in French. Oxford: Clarendon Press. ISBN 0-19-866125-8.
