= Prix Jean Freustié =

French literary prize

The Prix Jean-Freustié is a French literary prize created in 1987 by Christiane Teurlay-Freustié, second wife of writer and publisher Jean Freustie (1914–1983) to which it pays tribute, and his friends Nicole and Frédéric Vitoux as well as writer Bernard Frank. It rewards a French-speaking writer for a prose work: a novel, short story, autobiography, biography or essay. The prize is awarded annually.

The Prix Jean Freustié Foundation, under the aegis of the Fondation de France, was created thanks to the generosity of Christiane Teurlay-Freustié, her founder who died in 2010. The annual grant is 20,000 euros.

As of 2016, the members of the jury are: Charles Dantzig, writer; Jean-Claude Fasquelle, former director of the éditions Grasset; Annick Geille, journalist; Henri-Hugues Lejeune, writer; Éric Neuhoff, president of the jury, critic at Le Figaro and writer; Anthony Palou, writer and columnist at Le Figaro; Jean-Noël Pancrazi, writer, also a member of the prix Renaudot; Frédéric Vitoux of the Académie française, writer; Anne Wiazemsky, writer and member of the prix Médicis.

== List of laureates ==
- 2016: Stéphane Hoffmann for Un enfant plein d'angoisse et très sage (Albin Michel)
- 2015: Hédi Kaddour for Les Prépondérants (Éditions Gallimard)
- 2014: Olivier Frébourg for La Grande Nageuse (Mercure de France)
- 2013: Philippe Vilain for La Femme infidèle (Éditions Grasset)
- 2012: Bernard Chapuis for Onze ans avec Lou (Stock)
- 2011: prize suspended
- 2010: prize suspended
- 2009: Philippe Djian for Impardonnables (Gallimard)
- 2008: Sorj Chalandon for Mon traître (Grasset)
- 2007: Anne Wiazemsky for Jeune Fille (Gallimard)
- 2006: Alexis Salatko for Horowitz et mon père (Fayard)
- 2005: Gaspard Koenig for Octave avait vingt ans (Grasset) and Jérôme Garcin for Bartabas, roman (Gallimard)
- 2004: Christophe Donner for Ainsi va le jeune loup au sang (Grasset)
- 2003: Sylvie Caster for Dormir (Pauvert)
- 2002: Jean Rolin for La Clôture (POL)
- 2001: Charles Dantzig for Nos vies hâtives (Grasset)
- 2000: Myriam Anissimov for Sa majesté la mort (Éditions du Seuil)
- 1999: Serge Joncour for Vu (Le Dilettante)
- 1998: Jean-Noël Pancrazi for Long Séjour (Gallimard)
- 1997: Gérard Guégan for La Demi-sœur (Grasset)
- 1996: Gilles Martin-Chauffier for Une affaire embarrassante (Grasset)
- 1995: François Cérésa for La Femme au cheveu rouge (Éditions Julliard)
- 1994: Christian Giudicelli for Quartiers d'Italie (Le Rocher)
- 1993: Jean-Paul Kauffmann for L'Arche des Kerguelen (Groupe Flammarion)
- 1992: Eduard Limonov for L'Étranger dans sa ville natale (Ramsay)
- 1991: François Taillandier for Les Clandestins (Bernard de Fallois)
- 1990: Marcel Schneider for L'Éternité fragile (Grasset)
- 1989: Luc Lang for Voyage sur la ligne d'horizon (Gallimard)
- 1988: Angelo Rinaldi for Les Roses de Pline (Gallimard)
- 1987: François Michel for Le Silence et sa réponse (JC Lattès)
