= Prix Décembre =

French literary award

- Country: France
- Presented by: Fondation Pierre-Bergé-Yves-Saint-Laurent
- Formerly called: Prix Novembre
- Rewards: €15,000 since 2019 €30,000 until 2017
- First award: 1989

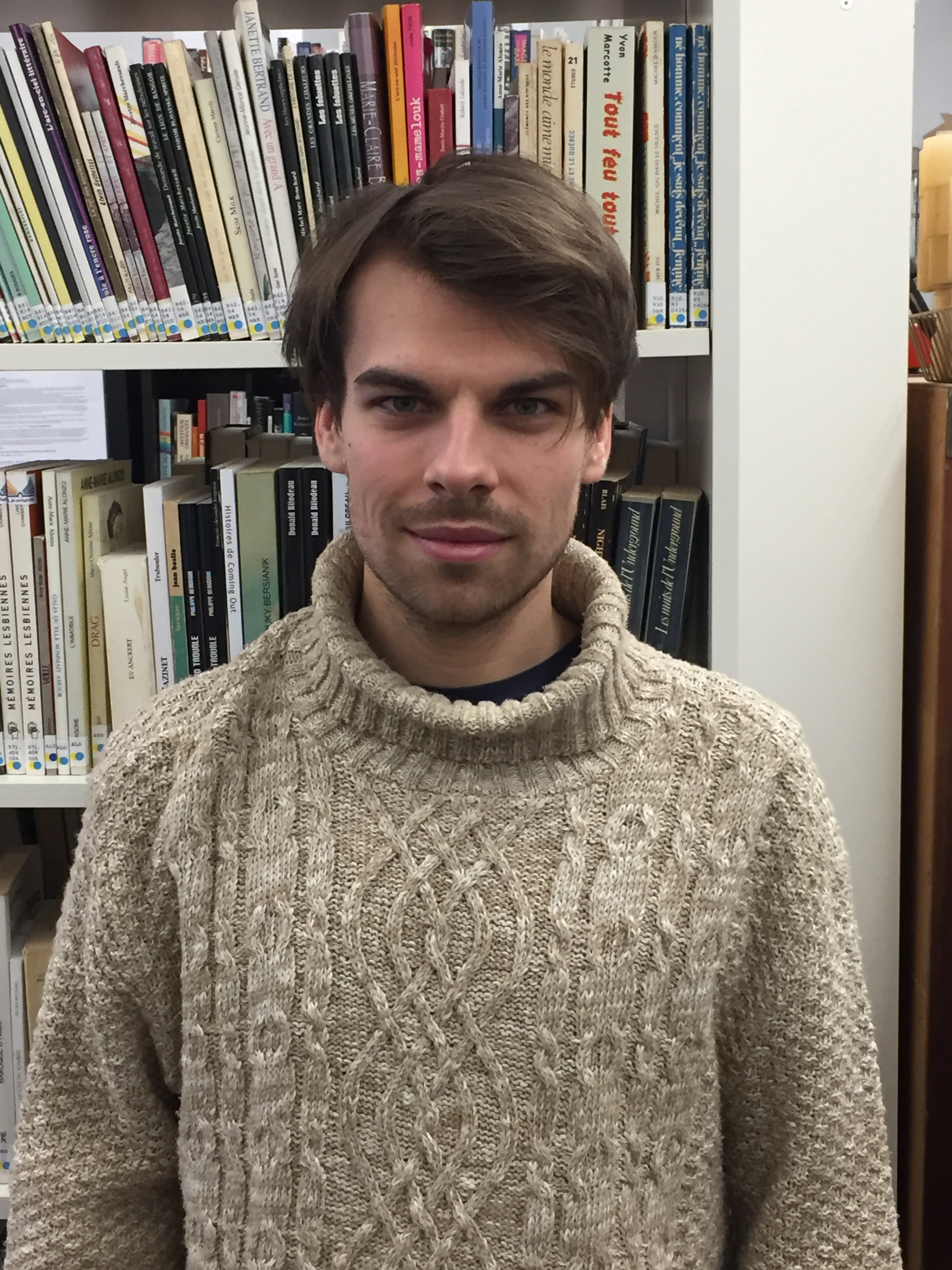
Kevin Lambert (2023 winner)

The Prix Décembre, originally known as the Prix Novembre, is one of France's premier literary awards. It was founded under the name Prix Novembre in 1989 by Philippe Dennery (Michel Dennery, according to other sources). In 1998, the founder resigned after he disapproved awarding of the prize to Michel Houellebecq's novel Atomised. The prize then got a new patron – Pierre Bergé – and a new name: Prix Decembre.

== Winners ==
=== Prix Novembre ===
| Year | Author | Title |
|---|---|---|
| 1989 | Guy Dupré | Les Manoeuvres d'automne |
| 1990 | François Maspero | Les Passagers du Roissy-Express |
| 1991 | Raphaël Confiant | Eau de café |
| 1992 | Henri Thomas | La Chasse au trésor |
| 1992 | Roger Grenier | Regardez la neige qui tombe |
| 1993 | René de Obaldia | Exobiographie |
| 1994 | Jean Hatzfeld | L'Air de guerre |
| 1994 | Éric Holder | La Belle Jardinière |
| 1995 | Jean Échenoz | Les Grandes Blondes |
| 1996 | Régis Debray | Loués soient nos seigneurs: une éducation politique |
| 1997 | Lydie Salvayre | La Compagnie des spectres |
| 1998 | Michel Houellebecq | Les Particules élémentaires |

=== Prix Decembre ===
| Year | Author | Title |
|---|---|---|
| 1999 | Claude Askolovitch | Voyage au bout de la France |
| 2000 | Anthony Palou | Camille |
| 2001 | Chloé Delaume | Le Cri du sablier |
| 2002 | Pierre Michon | Abbés and Corps du Roi |
| 2003 | Régis Jauffret | Univers, univers |
| 2004 | Philippe Forest | Sarinagara |
| 2005 | Charles Dantzig | Dictionnaire égoïste de la littérature française |
| 2006 | Pierre Guyotat | Coma |
| 2007 | Yannick Haenel | Cercle |
| 2008 | Mathias Énard | Zone |
| 2009 | Jean-Philippe Toussaint | La Vérité sur Marie |
| 2010 | Frédéric Schiffter | Philosophie sentimentale |
| 2011 | Jean-Christophe Bailly | Le Dépaysement. Voyages en France |
| 2011 | Olivier Frébourg | Gaston et Gustave |
| 2012 | Mathieu Riboulet | Les Œuvres de miséricorde |
| 2013 | Maël Renouard | La Réforme de l'opéra de Pékin |
| 2014 | Elisabeth Roudinesco | Sigmund Freud, en son temps et dans le nôtre |
| 2015 | Christine Angot | Un amour impossible |
| 2016 | Alain Blottière | Comment Baptiste est mort, Gallimard |
| 2017 | Grégoire Bouillier | Le Dossier M, Flammarion |
| 2018 | Michael Ferrier | François, portrait d’un absent, Gallimard |
| 2019 | Claudie Hunzinger | Les Grands Cerfs, Grasset |
| 2020 | Grégory Le Floch | Parcourir le monde et d'y rôder, Christian Bourgois |
| 2021 | Xavier Galmiche | Le Poulailler métaphysique, Le Pommier |
| 2022 | Lola Lafon | Quand tu écouteras cette chanson, Stock |
| 2023 | Kev Lambert | Que notre joie demeure, Le Nouvel Attila |
| 2024 | Abdellah Taïa | Le Bastion des Larmes |
| 2025 | Laura Vazquez | Les Forces |
