= Annick Geille =

French writer and journalist

Annick Geille is a French writer and journalist. She won the prix du premier roman in 1981 for Portrait d'un amour coupable and prix Alfred-Née of the Académie française in 1984 for Une femme amoureuse. With Robert Doisneau, she is also cofounder of the magazine Femme.

She had a long-term affair with Françoise Sagan, after Geille approached Sagan about an article for the magazine that she edited, French Playboy.

As of 2021, she is a member of the jury of the Prix Jean-Freustié.

== Works ==
- 1978: Le Nouvel homme, JC Lattès
- 1981: Portrait d'un amour coupable, Grasset
- 1984: Une femme amoureuse, Grasset
- 1986: La Voyageuse du soir, Gallimard
- 1990: Les Roses électriques, Flammarion
- 1999: Une époque en or, éditions Mazarine
- 2002: Le Diable au cœur, Denoël
- 2005: Femme en voie de disparition, Denoël
- 2007: Un amour de Sagan, Éditions Pauvert
- 2011: Pour lui, Fayard
