= François Taillandier =

French writer (1955–2026)

François Taillandier (1955 – 23 June 2026) was a French writer portraying the French contemporary society.

== Background ==
As a 12-year-old, Taillandier was inspired by Henri Vernes, creator of Bob Morane. In 1968 he began to read Honoré de Balzac. This classic French writer and Edmond Rostand, Cyrano's father, had a strong influence on him. Attending classical literature studies in the university, he graduated in 1977 with a memoir about the Marquis de Sade.

In 1979 he taught literature for four years before resigning from his position to become a full-time writer.

In 1984 he became journalist for the Revue Hebdo. Taillandier finds the inspiration walking in Paris, listening to conversations while in the bistros. In 2006 he was appointed president of the Société des gens de lettres. Taillandier, divorcé, is the father of three.

== Works ==
In 1990 Taillandier published Les Clandestins, rewarded by the Prix Jean-Freustié. In 1992 the novel Les Nuits Racine received the Roger Nimier Prize.

In 1999 Anielka is published and received the Grand Prix du roman de l'Académie française.

In 2005 he published Option Paradis, the first novel in a series of a five-interlinked novels cycle, divided in fifty-five chapters (eleven chapters each novel) called La Grande Intrigue (The Big Plot), reviving a French classical literature tradition (La Comédie Humaine by Honoré de Balzac, Les Rougon-Macquart by Émile Zola). Following the evolution of five families through five generations, this work will be completed in 2010, celebrating the Taillandier's fifty-fifth anniversary. Telling, the second novel of this series was published in 2006.

== Later life and death ==
Taillandier wrote for French newspapers Le Figaro, l'Humanité and la Montagne and kept developing La Grande Intrigue, writing "only when everybody is sleeping".

Taillandier died on 23 June 2026, at the age of 71.

== Bibliography ==
=== Novels ===
- Personages de la rue du Couteau (Julliard, 1984)
- Tott (Julliard, 1985)
- Benoît ou les contemporains obscurs (Julliard, 1986)
- Les clandestins (De Fallois, 1990)
- Les Nuits Racine (De Fallois, 1992)
- Mémoires de Monte-Cristo (De Fallois, 1994)
- Des hommes qui s'éloignent (Fayard, 1997)
- Anielka (Stock, 1999)
- Journal de Marseille (Rocher, 1999)
- N6, La route de l'Italie (Stock, 2000)
- Le cas Gentile, (Stock, 2001)
- Option paradis (Stock, 2005)
- Telling (Stock, 2006)
- Il n'y a personne dans les tombes (Stock, 2007)

=== Short stories ===
- Intrigues (00h00 editions, 2001)

=== Essays ===
- Aragon (Fayard, 1997)
- Borges (François Bourin, 1993)
- Les parents lâcheurs (Rocher, 2001)

=== Biography ===
- Balzac (Gallimard, Folio)

== Citations ==
- Tout une part de la production romanesque contemporaine est rassurante. Ce sont des romans qui miment le roman. Ils trahissent une grande nostalgie pour le passé.
