= Guy Dupré =

French writer and publisher

Guy Dupré (February 27, 1928 – January 17, 2018) was a French writer and publisher.

== Biography ==
Dupré published three novels, two books of memoirs and a collection of chronicles, but the unity of his style and his writing unconcerned with traditional genres makes the same voice heard from one book to the other.

At the time of its publication (1953), his first work, Les Fiancées sont froides, was hailed by Albert Béguin, André Breton, and Julien Gracq. This poetic and initiatory account, with its rather obscure intrigue, bears the imprint of German Romanticism. Plotting a fugitive hussar in the time of the Napoleonic wars, it is set on the shores of the Baltic Sea and is not without evoking Le Coup de Grâce (1939) by Marguerite Yourcenar. The subject and the style of the book earned Dupré to be attached to the movement of the Hussards.

Guy Dupré joined the publishing house Plon, which has long specialized in military memorabilia. He prepared a biography of General Charles Mangin that was never completed but whose face would appear in Le Grand coucher. He made an anthology of Maurice Barrès (Mes Cahiers, Plon, 1962), an anthology of the Chroniques de la Grande Guerre of the same (Plon, 1968), as well as the cross-correspondence between Maurice Barrès and Charles Maurras: La République ou le Roi, correspondance 1888-1923, Plon, 1970.

Close to novelist Jean Parvulesco, he wrote the preface for his L'Étoile de l'Empire invisible (Guy Trédaniel, 1994).

== Bibliography ==
- 1953: Les Fiancées sont froides, Plon
- 1986: Les Mamantes, Éditions Grasset
- 1989: Les Manœuvres d'automne, Éditions Olivier Orban, Prix Novembre
- 1996: C'est le sang de l'amour et le sang de la peine, Guy Trédaniel
- 2001: Comme un adieu dans une langue oubliée, Grasset
- 2002: Dis-moi qui tu hantes, éditions du Rocher
- 2006: Reprint in one vol. of the three novels: Les fiancées sont froides, le Grand Coucher, les Mamantes, followed by "Guy Dupré ou les deux histoires enlacées", from Écrivains de France, XXe siècle by Michel Mourlet, and an interview with Sarah Vajda, Éditions du Rocher
- 2010: L'âme charnelle, Journal 1953-1978, Éditions Bartillat

In 2003, Guy Dupré was awarded the Grand Prix de Littérature Henri Gal of the Académie française for Dis-moi qui tu hantes, and his life achievement.
