= Prix François Mauriac (Académie française) =

French literary award

The Prix François Mauriac is a French literary and philosophy prize awarded to a young writer by the Académie Française. Founded in 1994, the prize is awarded annually, funded by a group of foundations and individuals. It is named in honour of François Mauriac, winner of the Nobel Prize in Literature in 1952, "for the deep spiritual insight and the artistic intensity with which he has in his novels penetrated the drama of human life".
