= Marianne (magazine) =

French weekly news magazine

- The 14 April 2007 front page of Marianne (bestseller)
- Type: Weekly magazine
- Format: Compact
- Owner: Czech Media Invest
- Editor-in-chief: Ève Szeftel
- Founded: 1997
- Political alignment: Originally: Left-wing; Today: sovereignist, right-wing
- Headquarters: Paris
- Circulation: 135,536 (2020)
- ISSN: 1275-7500
- Website: www.marianne.net

Marianne (French pronunciation: [maʁjan]) is a Paris-based French weekly news magazine founded in 1997 by Jean-François Kahn and Maurice Szafran. It was named after the personification of France and Liberty, Marianne.

Its original political slant was described as left-wing. However, in the 2010s, it shifted towards a more sovereigntist editorial line.

While the magazine had been majority-owned by Yves de Chaisemartin, 91% of the capital was sold to Czech billionaire Daniel Křetínský in 2018, with Natacha Polony taking over as managing editor (directrice de la rédaction).

== History and profile ==
=== Founded with a left-wing republican line in 1997 ===
Marianne was created in 1997 by Jean-François Kahn with Maurice Szafran as editorialist. Its title takes up that of Marianne (1932–1940), a former left-leaning political and literary journal which was published in Paris in the 1930s, now defunct magazine. At its creation, the editorial line of the magazine was perceived as being rather left-wing.

In 1997, in its first issue, the magazine devoted a special report to the Agusta-Dassault affair. The French businessman Serge Dassault tried to have the publication banned, and had the first issue seized after three days on sale. The latter presented him as “the tricolor emperor of corruption”.

=== 2007 presidential election ===
During the 2007 French presidential election Marianne conducted a strong anti-Sarkozy campaign in the magazine including a special issue released on April 14~20 (#521), the day before the vote, arguing that right-wing candidate Nicolas Sarkozy was "insane" (which was the title of a previous issue) in a negative portrait "of all dangers" (de tous les dangers). Such aggressive practice, which may be rather common in Great Britain and the United States, is unusual in France.

Issue #521 "The Real Sarkozy" (Le Vrai Sarkozy) was named after the popular anti-Sarkozy propaganda video first released on July 5, 2006, in online services – as Dailymotion (+2,132,686 views) French counterpart of YouTube (+927,770) – by left wing supporters group RéSo (close to the French Socialist Party's Dominique Strauss-Kahn wing) author of the "AntiSarko" 2005 online campaign, which became the magazine's best seller (580,000 copies). It was since then made online for free in the magazine's website. The issue sold well with an exceptional out of print and two reprints, but some journalists argued that the criticisms against Sarkozy actually strengthened Sarkozy's supporters per the victimization process.

The previous issue's (#520) cover titled "Sarkozy's fault: he chose Bush's America against Chirac's France" (La faute de Sarkozy: Il choisit l'Amérique de Bush contre la France de Chirac) as a reference to Sarkozy having been one of the few French politicians initially supporting the 2003 invasion of Iraq which has been described by the French far-left and left-wing as a "fault", as well as by a part of the Gaullist right-wing as a "mistake".

In February 2008, the magazine launched the “February 14th appeal” for republican vigilance, signed by 17 political figures from all walks of life, reaffirming their attachment to republican principles, secularism and the independence of the press, and their support for the major options that have guided France's foreign policy for the past fifty years. These include Nicolas Dupont-Aignan, Dominique de Villepin, Ségolène Royal and François Bayrou.

In 2009, sales of Marianne fell by 18.7%. According to Le Monde, the editorial team is divided into two groups: sovereigntist republicans in the tradition of Jean-François Kahn, the magazine's founder who left in 2007, and social-democrats. This divide prevents Marianne from taking a stand on certain social issues, such as undocumented immigrants and police blunders.

=== Investigative journalism development and election year (2010-2012) ===
In 2010 and 2011, the weekly Marianne increased its sales thanks to its publications on the Bettencourt affair, in which it competed with Mediapart. Marianne published an investigation including a new facsimile of the diary of Liliane Bettencourt's ex-treasurer.

In 2010, a Marianne investigation revealed that Robert Barcia, founder and leader of the Trotskyist Lutte Ouvrière party, had been dead for over a year.

In 2011, at a Marianne seminar, investigative reporting was defined as one of the magazine's key priorities for the 2012 election year.

The magazine offers a web version called Marianne 2, renamed Marianne in 2012, designed and directed by Philippe Cohen until 2012. The designer of Marianne 2, Pierre Cohen, was forced to resign in 2012 by Maurice Szafran following the publication of a biography of Jean-Marie Le Pen (co-written with Pierre Péan) deemed too complacent.

In 2012, documents revealed by Marianne showed influence peddling by Lyonnaise des Eaux, which had worked with the firm Vae Solis to “discredit” the local action of the Les lacs de l'Essonne agglomeration community.

In the same year, after the departure of journalists Nicolas Beau and Stéphanie Marteau, Le Monde interpreted this event as the closure of the magazine's Investigation unit. The weekly's deputy editor denied this, and replied that, on the contrary, Marianne was evolving in the direction of a stronger investigative section.

In April 2012, Marianne's editorial team published the voting intentions of the weekly's journalists for the French presidential election: François Hollande (left-wing) received 40% of the vote, ahead of Jean-Luc Mélenchon (far-left) (31.7%), with François Bayrou (centrist) and Nicolas Dupont-Aignan (sovereignism) tied for 3rd place at 8.3%. Three candidates received no votes at all: Nicolas Sarkozy (right), Marine Le Pen (nationalism) and Nathalie Arthaud (communism). 74% of Marianne's readership voted for a left-wing candidate in the first round.

=== Magazine redesign in 2013 ===
As of 29 June 2013, the magazine is completely overhauled, taking the name Le Nouveau Marianne. It remains under the direction of Maurice Szafran, who declares his desire to create a magazine with a “pedagogical” layout and a content mix of “short papers and long articles, without medium-sized papers”. Yves de Chaisemartin sidelined Maurice Szafran and Laurent Neumann to become the ultra-majority shareholder, with 86% of the capital. Joseph Macé-Scaron and Frederick Cassegrain, formerly of Le Figaro, are appointed editorial director and managing director.

In 2013, the magazine provided exclusive evidence in the Élysée polls affair, in which Nicolas Sarkozy was suspected of having commissioned surveys for his own campaign, paid for with public money.

In 2014, in the Bygmalion affair, the weekly managed to obtain the UMP's internal report compiling, among other things, the list of fictitious conventions invoiced at the party's request. The same year, Marianne published recordings of threats made against a deputy mayor in one of the offices of the UDI mayor of Bobigny, which included Jean-Christophe Lagarde's chief of staff.

In 2015, Marianne stirred up controversy when it revealed that UMP officials and FN personalities had spent New Year's Eve together.

In 2017, extracts from documents published by Marianne and Mediapart showed that the European Anti-Fraud Office suspected a “fictitious employment contract” at the European Parliament for Marine Le Pen's bodyguard.

=== Recovery plan and editorial identity crisis in 2017 ===
At the end of 2017, the Paris Commercial Court approved Marianne's receivership (in progress since 2016), which included a refocusing of the magazine's activities and a reduction in its workforce. Internally, the magazine is going through an identity crisis concerning its editorial line. Part of the editorial staff calls for clarification and denounces editorial choices.

=== Daniel Křetínský's takeover and adoption of a sovereignist line in 2018 ===
After its takeover in April 2018 by Czech billionaire Daniel Křetínský, a French speaker since studying in Dijon in 1995 and married to Anna Kellner, daughter of the Czech Republic's first fortune, the weekly took a new turn under the direction of Natacha Polony. Křetínský simplified Marianne's structure and incorporated it into its parent company, CMI France.

In 2018, Marianne uncovered a conflict of interest involving Françoise Nyssen, the Minister of Culture, in the awarding of subsidies to a publishing company she owned.

In 2019, Le Monde described Marianne's new editorial line as “more sovereignist” and director Natacha Polony as “sovereignist ”. For the left-wing newspaper Libération, the editorial line became “sovereignist and anti-liberal” after the arrival of Natacha Polony. A year after Natacha Polony's arrival, half of the editorial staff's forty journalists left the company.

In 2021, for Hadrien Mathoux, who covers politics for the magazine, Marianne “criticizes the left, but to reflect on its own errors and the cause of its failures”. Pauline Bock of Arrêt sur images believes that it is in fact above all the left inspired by the new anti-racist and feminist militantism that is continually targeted, the left that the magazine groups into “obsessed with race, sex, gender, identity”; a former journalist explained that: “Marianne's theory is that by obsessing over the societal and abandoning the social, the left has lost the working classes and pushed them into the arms of the FN”. According to Bock, criticism of the left is far more present in Marianne than criticism of the RN, and the magazine's left-wing markers, such as criticism of neoliberalism, are made invisible by the mass of societal articles.

=== Election and front page in favor of Emmanuel Macron in 2022 ===
In April 2022, between the two rounds of the presidential election, Marianne's Society of Editors denounced a “direct intervention” by the paper's main shareholder, Daniel Křetínský, to change the front cover of the issue to be published. Continuing a series of anti-Macron front pages, the original version of the cover should show the eyes of two candidates Emmanuel Macron and Marine Le Pen with the headline “Anger or chaos?”, without taking sides. But the final text, “Despite the anger... ...avoid the chaos”, clearly announces a preference for Emmanuel Macron. For the editorial team, this intervention by the majority owner, Daniel Křetínský, “represents a serious attack on Marianne's editorial independence”. It came after he had twice promised journalists that he would respect this basic principle. For Libération, Daniel Křetínský's accusation of interventionism by Marianne's editorial staff feeds suspicions of collusion between media owners and Emmanuel Macron.

=== Publication of investigations and change of format (2023-2024) ===
In 2023, Marianne journalist Gabriel Libert is behind the revelation of the politico-financial scandal surrounding Minister Marlène Schiappa's “Marianne fund” (the magazine's namesake). The investigation revealed the opaque management of subsidies from the fund, and resulted in the Minister's dismissal for lying, instrumentalizing the murder of Samuel Paty and using public subsidies for political ends. In particular, the subsidies were used to pay essayist Mohamed Sifaoui.

In 2023, a report by Marianne's investigations unit revealed that the government had lied on the issue of motorway concessions, and revealed particularly opaque negotiating conditions. This would have enabled Vinci, Eiffage and other companies to benefit from excess profits of 9 billion euros. Following this publication, the Paris public prosecutor's office opened an investigation into the use of forgeries, involving, among others, the Minister of the Economy, Bruno Le Maire, and the government's secretary general, Claire Landais.

In July 2023, following an investigation by Marianne based on a report by the Cour des Comptes, the National Financial Prosecutor's office (Parquet national financier) opened a preliminary investigation into illegal interest-taking. The weekly had revealed that more than 200 Bpifrance employees - including CEO Nicolas Dufourcq - had "massively invested" in a fund dubbed Bpifrance Entreprises 1. The fund, designed to make it "easier for French people to invest their savings in French companies", is said to have enabled investors to double their stake in two and a half years.

In September 2023, Morocco expelled two of the magazine's journalists who were investigating King Mohammed VI and "human rights violations" in the country.

In early 2024, Marianne's investigative unit was strengthened with the recruitment of journalist Marc Endeweld.

In March 2024, Marianne launched a new formula with a lower cover price (from €4.40 to €3.50) and reduced pagination (from 88 to 52 pages). This included a new layout and a new slogan, La vérité n'a pas de maître ("Truth has no master"). The front page moves away from the news magazine model, taking its cue from the daily press. The formula contained a greater amount of investigative reporting, and put an end to the classic columns, replaced by Marianne “reveals”, “deciphers”, “proposes”, “recounts” and “debates”.

In April 2024, Daniel Křetínský sought to sell the magazine, whose sovereignist line was at odds with his Europhile and liberal positions. French billionaire Pierre-Édouard Stérin was a candidate to acquire the magazine.

In January 2025, Ève Szeftel left the newspaper Liberation to became editor. In September, 71% of voting staff supported a motion condemning her editorship, and specifically her decisions on coverage of Israel.

== Organization ==
=== Circulation ===
Marianne previously claimed a circulation of 300,000 copies per week, reaching a peak of 580,000, with "The Real Sarkozy" edition in April 2007. During the period of 2007–2008 the circulation of the magazine was 275,000 copies. It was 264,000 copies in 2010.

Until 2013, the magazine sold an average of over 200,000 copies each month, before falling back in subsequent years. The circulation is about 146,000 in late 2016.

Year	Paid circulation France	Annual change	Total circulation (including free papers)
2012	234,816	-	246,715
2013	196,030	▼ - 16.5%	204,881
2014	155,644	▼ - 20.6%	164,147
2015	156,646	▲ + 0.6%	164,894
2016	143,515	▼ - 8.4%	148,169
2017	143,476	▼ - 0.03%	150,578
2018	120,372	▼ - 16.10%	129,850
2019	124,122	▲ + 2.79%	130,052
2020	132,547	▲ + 4.40%	135,536
2021	131,377	▲	135,406
2022	130,637	▼	134,307

=== Management ===
Jean-François Kahn was director from the newspaper's creation in 1997 until 2007. At Natacha Polony's request, he agreed in 2019 to take over a weekly editorial column, entitled “Mise au point”.

After the 2012 presidential election, the newspaper struggled to redefine its editorial line and, against a backdrop of general crisis in the press, experienced an erosion in circulation (-7.96% in 2012) and revenues.

At the end of 2013, under pressure from Yves de Chaisemartin and the title's declining sales, Maurice Szafran and Laurent Neumann were dismissed and the weekly's management was reshuffled. CEO Maurice Szafran announces his resignation on November 6, 2013, alleging a strategic divergence with other shareholders. Called upon by shareholders to help turn the situation around, Jean-François Kahn led the editorial team of the Nouveau Marianne, conceived by him from June to December 2013, before handing over to Joseph Macé-Scaron.

In May 2016, Renaud Dély took over as managing editor, with Joseph Macé-Scaron appointed chairman of the editorial board.

On the Marianne website, the team was reshuffled in November 2015. The marianne.net site is now steered by Delphine Legouté, digital director, and Thomas Vampouille, editor-in-chief.

Renaud Dély left the newspaper in August 2018, replaced on September 6 by Natacha Polony as editorial director. She “will be in charge of setting up a bimedia organization and accelerating digital developments” for the title.

=== Ownership and finances ===
Until 2005, the main shareholder was Robert Assaraf (49.38% of the capital), also Chairman of the Supervisory Board of Marianne. Subsequently, the main shareholders were: 57%: Yves de Chaisemartin; 31%: Marianne Finances (Maurice Szafran); other shareholders: Paul Lederman, Guy Sitbon, Thierry Verret and Franck Ullmann.

In 2006, according to Stratégies magazine, the iconoclastic and provocative magazine was being shunned by advertisers. In fact, Marianne is said to devote just 6 pages per issue to advertising, compared with 10 for its competitors. Advertising also accounts for only 5% of the weekly's revenues, whereas sales and subscriptions account for 95%.

According to the French Ministry of Culture and Communication, Marianne received 1,504,222 euros in state financial aid in 2012.

==== 2017: placement in receivership and redundancy plan ====
In early 2017, the magazine's publishing company was placed in receivership, with the aim of paying off its liabilities of 3 million euros. “This decision was taken with the sole aim of securing its future, by enabling it to preserve its cash flow and regain the means to achieve its ambitions,” explains its chairman and CEO Yves de Chaisemartin.

On 18 August 2017, the Paris Commercial Court approves the redundancy plan presented by Yves de Chaisemartin. It provides for the number of permanent employees to be reduced from 52 to 46.

==== 2018: takeover bid from Czech Media Invest ====
On 19 April 2018, the magazine announces that it has received a “firm proposal to acquire” 91% of its capital from Czech Media Invest, owner of Czech News Center. Yves de Chaisemartin would remain Chairman and CEO after the sale. The sale was finalized in June, and the CEO resigned in September 2018, to be replaced initially by Gérald Berge, who acted as interim CEO until the arrival in December 2018 of the new CEO, Richard Lenormand (former CEO of Europe 1). In January 2020, after three years as CEO of the regional daily Paris-Normandie, Frédéric Cassegrain returns to Marianne (he was CEO from 2013 to 2017) as publication director.

=== Workforce and results ===
In 2015, Marianne employed 69 people. In 2018, its sales were €17,840,400 and its net loss €2,110,600.

== Contributors ==
- Claude Askolovitch
- Robert Assaraf
- Élie Barnavi
- Nicolas Bedos
- Patrick Besson
- Anna Cabana
- Stéphane Denis
- Jacques Derogy
- Clara Dupont-Monod
- Benoît Duteurtre
- François Gautier
- Nicolas Hénin
- Danièle Heymann
- Dominique Jamet
- Jacques Julliard
- Jean-François Kahn
- Aude Lancelin
- Élisabeth Lévy
- Jean-Dominique Merchet
- Philippe Muray
- Pierre Péan
- Natacha Polony
- Alain Rémond
- Vanessa Schneider
- Daniel Schneidermann
- Denis Tillinac
- Jean-Claude Valla

== See also ==
- Marianne, the publication's namesake and symbol of France
