= Nouvelles Mythologies =

Collection of texts published in 2007

Nouvelles Mythologies is a collection of 57 texts written by authors, journalists and editorialists under the direction of Jérôme Garcin and published in 2007 at Éditions du Seuil to celebrate the 50th anniversary of the publication of the essay Mythologies by Roland Barthes.

== List of myths and their authors ==
- Le speed-dating by Nelly Arcan
- Michel Houellebecq by Pierre Assouline
- Les 35 Heures by Jacques Attali
- Le 20-Heure by Marc Augé
- Le plombier Polonais by Nicolas Baverez
- Le GPS by Frédéric Beigbeder
- Les journaux gratuits by Patrick Besson
- Les compagnies Low Cost by Bessora
- La nouvelle ève by Pascal Bruckner
- Le patch by Boris Cyrulnik
- Les séries télévisées by Charles Dantzig
- L'iPod by Angie David
- Zidane by Jacques Drillon
- Le sushi by Jean-Paul Dubois
- La Star academy by Benoît Duteurtre
- Les nouveaux amoureux by Christine Fiszcher
- Le botox by Sophie Fontanel
- Le commerce équitable by Francois Forrestier
- La nouvelle chanson française by Thierry Gandillot
- Le corps nu d'Emmanuelle Béart by Jérôme Garcin
- Les tentes rouges des SDF by Bernard Géniès
- La capsule Nespresso by Alix Girod de l'Ain
- Le voile by Patrick Grainville
- Le SMS by Didier Jacob
- La pensée unique by Denis Jeambar
- Le 21 avril 2002 by Laurent Joffrin
- Kate Moss by Marc Lambron
- Le déclinisme by Aude Lancelin
- Le 11 septembre 2001 by Claude Lanzmann
- Le 4x4 by David Le Breton
- La fièvre de l'authentique by Gilles Lipovetsky
- Le wifi by Alain Mabanckou
- Les people by Patrick Mauriès
- Google by Jacques-Alain Miller
- La poussette surdimensionnée by Catherine Millet
- Arcelor et Mittal by Ghislaine Ottenheimer
- La passion des sondages by Thierry Pech
- Fumer tue by Emmanuelle Pierrat
- Le football roi by Bernard Pivot
- Les OGM by Fabrice Pliskin
- La mort de l'abbé Pierre by Patrick Poivre d'Arvor
- Le phènomène Ducasse by Gilles Pudlowski
- Les bobos by Serge Raffy
- Le blog by Patrick Rambaud
- Le tailleur de Segolène by Philippe Raynaud
- Le grand cabas de fille by Jacqueline Rémy
- La gariguette by Jean-Marie Rouart
- La racaille et le Karcher by Daniel Sibony
- La smart by Yves Simon
- L'euro by Philippe Sollers
- Le digicode by François Taillandier
- Le coaching by Philippe Val
- Parce que je le vaux bien par Georges Vigarello
- La délocalisation by Paul Virilio
- Le vélo en ville by Frédéric Vitoux
- Nicolas Hulot by Arnaud Viviant
