= Stéphane Hoffmann =

French writer (born 1958)

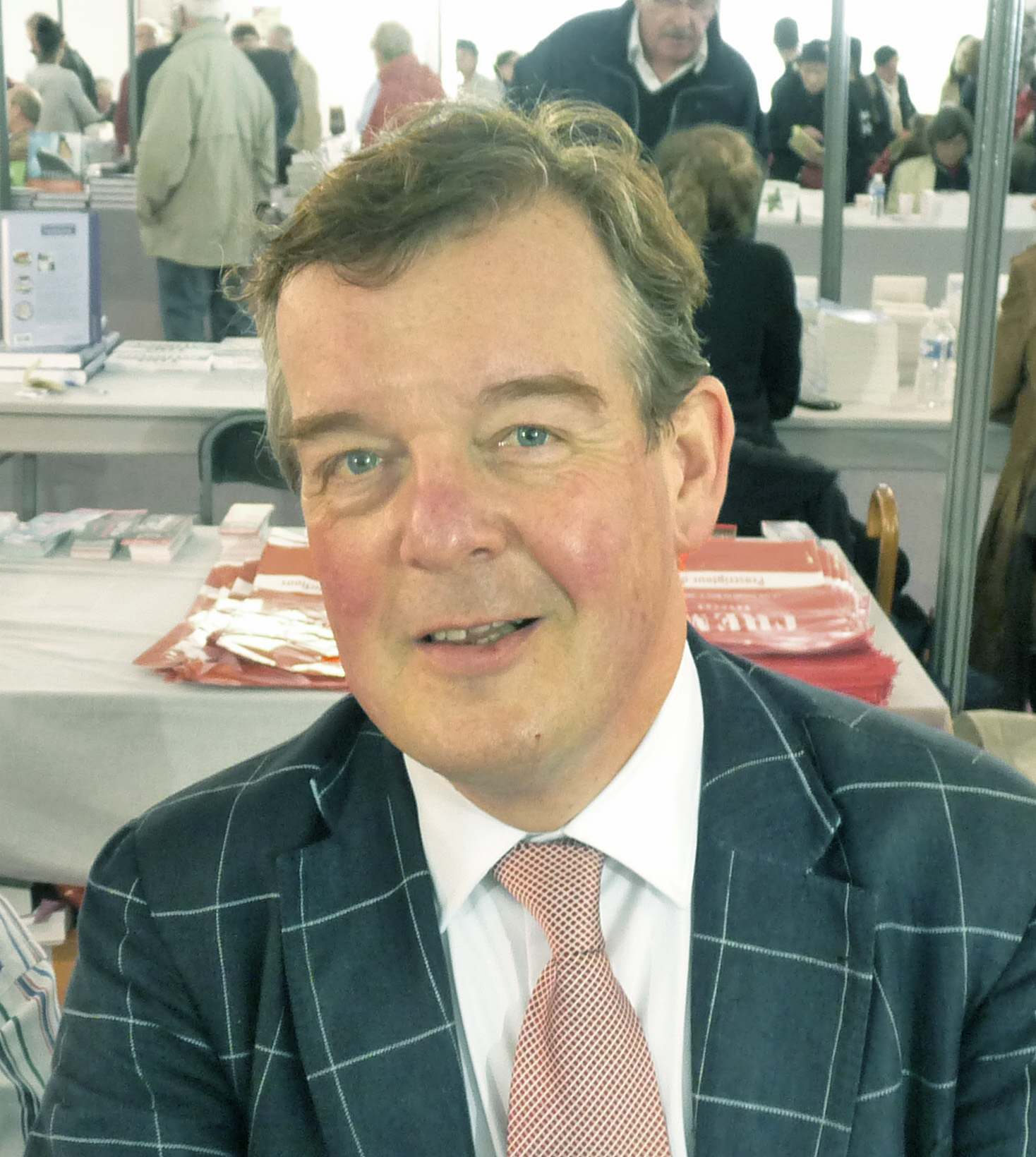
Stéphane Hoffmann in 2012

Stéphane Hoffmann (6 March 1958, Saint-Nazaire) is a French writer.

== Biography ==
Stéphane Hoffmann was sent to the Jesuits at Saint-François-Xavier in Vannes for ten years, then to the Frères de Ploërmel at the Lycée Saint-Louis in Saint-Nazaire.

After he studied in hypokhâgne at lycée Janson-de-Sailly in Paris, and although admitted in khâgne, he preferred to continue history and law studies in 1977 at the Paris-Sorbonne University and the Panthéon-Assas University. He finished them with a bachelor's degree in history (1980) and a master's degree in private law, obtained in 1983 in Nantes, where he lived from 1980 to 1992.

After three days working as a chronicler in the radios of Nantes, he organized "Les mardis nantais" between 1983 and 1987, evenings where he would receive some writers, including Félicien Marceau, Bernard-Henri Lévy, Jean d'Ormesson, Régine Deforges, Hélène Carrère d'Encausse, and Geneviève Dormann.

The publication of his first novel in 1989 opened him the doors of Le Figaro Magazine, where he published his first article on the history of the sandwich in 1990. He wrote a few hundred more on books, actresses, cigars and the best way to polish one's shoes.

Since March 2013, he holds a television critic's column: "La vision télé de Stéphane Hoffmann".

Having lived from 1992 to 2002 in four arrondissements of Paris (15th, 6th, 9th, 7th), he settled in La Douettée, a hamlet on the banks of the Isac, on the outskirts of the forest of Gâvre in Loire-Atlantique.

At La Baule-Escoublac, he has organized and animated since 2003 "Les Rendez-Vous de La Baule", where he invites every year twenty authors to meet their readers. And, since 2011, "Les Rendez-Vous des écrivains", the first weekend of December.

== Works ==
- 1989: Le gouverneur distrait, novel – Albin Michel
- 1990: Château Bougon, novel – Albin Michel, 1990 – Prix Roger Nimier 1991
- 1991: Voyage à l'Ouest - dix étapes en Loire-Atlantique. Conceived and presented by Stéphane Hoffmann, with texts by Patrick Besson, Michel Déon, Geneviève Dormann, Irène Frain, Luba Jurgenson, Félicien Marceau, Éric Neuhoff, François Nourissier, Didier van Cauwelaert and Armel de Wismes - Albin Michel
- 1994: Félicien Marceau, essay – Éditions du Rocher
- 1995: Gaillot l’Imposteur, leaflet – Éditions du Rocher
- 1996: Le Bon Tabac, traité sur les bienfaits du tabac – Albin Michel
- 1997: La Droite honteuse, tableau des mœurs politiques françaises à la fin du 20e siècle – Éditions du Rocher
- 1998: Le Grand Charles, or En écoutant Trenet chanter, portrait discographique de Charles Trenet – Albin Michel
- 2000: Journal d’un crétin, novel – Éditions du Rocher – Prix Louis Barthou of the Académie française
- 2001: La Gloire des cachalots, pamphlet contre les notables – Éditions du Rocher
- 2002: Le Gros Nul, selfportrait – Éditions du Rocher
- 2007: Des filles qui dansent, novel – Albin Michel – Prix Bretagne 2008
- 2008: Des garçons qui tremblent, novel – Albin Michel - Prix Ève Delacroix (Académie française) and Grand Prix d'honneur of la ville de La Baule (Société littéraire et artistique de La Baule)
- 2011: Les Autos tamponneuses, novel - Albin Michel, - first selection Prix de Flore 2011 - finalist Prix Interallié 2011 - finalist Prix des Deux Magots 2012
- 2014: Le Méchant prince et autres histoires sans morales, short stories - Albin Michel
- 2016: Un enfant plein d'angoisse et très sage, novel - Albin Michel - Prix Jean-Freustié 2016 - first selection Renaudot - first selection Grand Prix du roman de l'Académie française - first selection Interallié - selection Prix Renaudot young adult - finalist Grand prix Jean Giono - selection prix des Deux Magots 2017.
