= Radio J =

Jewish radio station in Paris

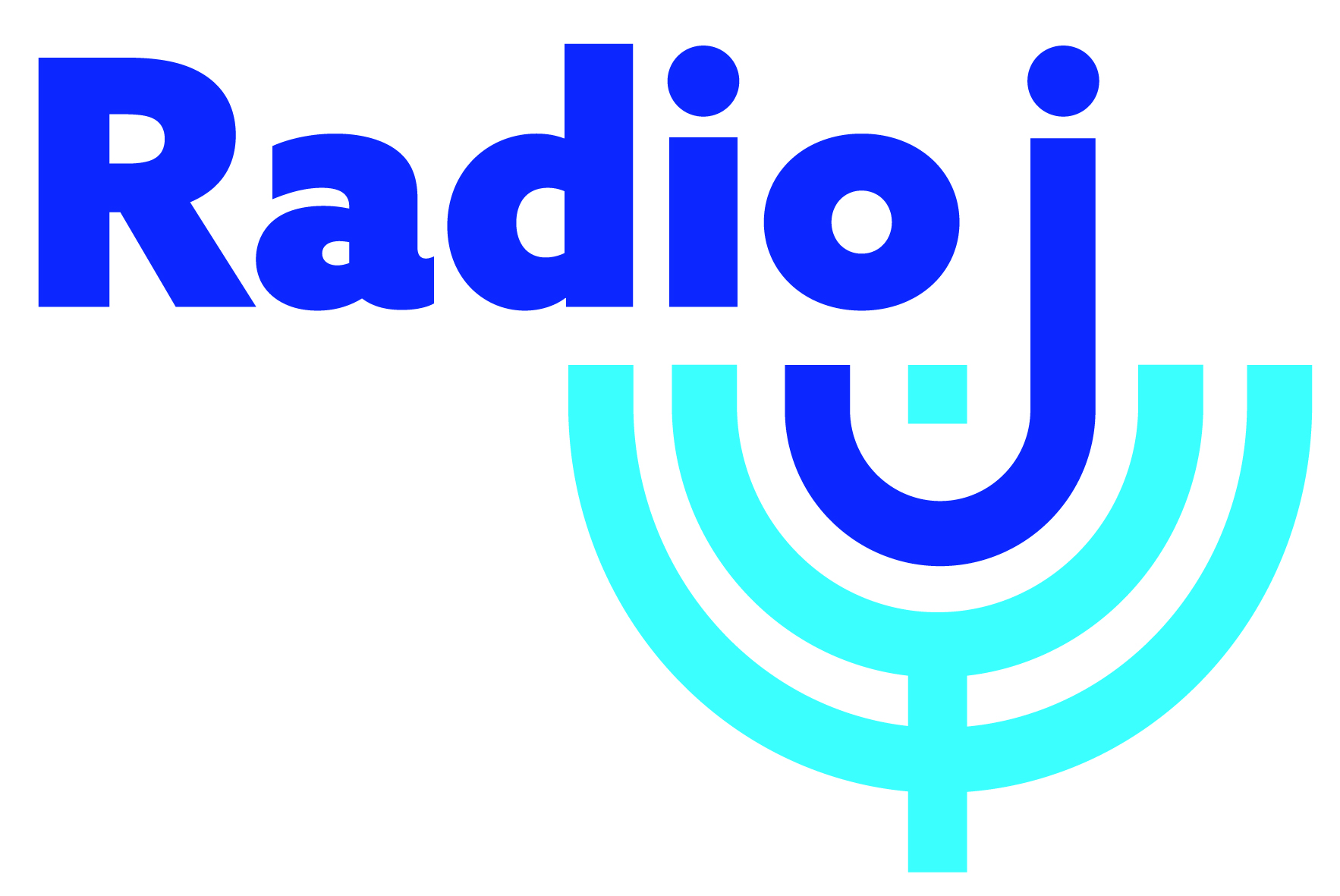

Paris; France
- Frequency: 94.8 MHz (shared time)

Ownership
- Owner: Groupe DPRJ

History
- First air date: 1981

Technical information
- ERP: 4 kW
- Transmitter coordinates: 48°52′48″N 2°17′2″E

Links
- Website: radioj.fr

Radio J is a Jewish community radio station in Paris. It broadcasts on 94.8 MHz in a time-sharing agreement with two additional Jewish stations, Radio Shalom and RCJ, from a transmitter in the 17th arrondissement of Paris, atop the Hyatt Regency Paris Étoile. It has half of the air time on the frequency after the 2020 unification of Radio J and Judaïques FM under common management and branding.

Of the three Jewish radio stations, Radio J is identified as the closest to the religious community and to the state of Israel and the most right-wing. One of its founders, Guy Rozanowicz, stated that "Radio J has allowed the Jews of France to strengthen their ties with the Jewish state". Michel Zerbib, who ran the Radio J newsroom in the mid-2000s, noted the station's "very militant stance in defense of the Jewish people and the State of Israel".

== History ==
After the liberalization of French radio in 1981, new stations sprang up across the country, including four Jewish stations in the Paris area. In 1983, the Haute Autorité de la communication audiovisuelle (HACA), then the French broadcast regulator, ordered the Jewish community radio stations to broadcast to the Paris area in a time sharing agreement: Radio Shalom, Radio J, Radio Communauté (renamed RCJ in 1992), and Judaïques FM. The stations reflected different components and points of view of the Jewish community. Groups close to the various stations called the time-sharing agreement a "congenital flaw" and "radio aberration".

In 2005, Radio J ended an agreement by which it used the same advertising management as Radio Shalom after a dispute emerged over an advertisement promoting a pilgrimage to a Tunisian synagogue, which Radio Shalom was willing to air but not the other stations.

=== Consolidation with Judaïques FM ===
In 2018, Marc Eisenberg took operational control of Radio J and Judaïques FM. At that time, both stations moved to the same facilities, though they remained separate for regulatory purposes, and began to share news and other resources. Dov Zerah was named the director of Radio J.

In 2020, the two stations announced that, with CSA approval, they would combine as Radio J, though still retaining separate operating authority. The combined station would share social media accounts and also be rated as one station by Médiamétrie. All existing programs would remain unchanged. The combined station broadcasts during Radio J's former hours of 4:00 to 8:00 and 14:00 to 16:30 as well as from 8:30 to 11:00, 21:00 to 23:00, and midnight to 2:30, time periods formerly associated with Judaïques FM.

== Programming ==
One of Radio J's most noted programs is the Sunday political show Le forum ("The Forum"), where remarks by guests are regularly reported on in the general media. In 2011, the station was criticized for inviting Marine Le Pen on the program—the first such invitation it had ever extended to a far-right politician—and retracted the invitation.
