= RCJ =

RCJ is a common abbreviation for

- RCJ (radio station), a Jewish radio station in Paris
- Royal Courts of Justice in the Strand in London, England
- Royal Courts of Justice, Belfast in Chichester Street in Belfast, Northern Ireland
- Rogationists of the Heart of Jesus, a Catholic religious order
