= Radio Shalom (Paris) =

Jewish radio station in Paris

Paris; France
- Frequency: 94.8 MHz (shared time)

History
- First air date: 1981

Technical information
- ERP: 4 kW
- Transmitter coordinates: 48°52′48″N 2°17′2″E

Links
- Website: radioshalom.fr

Radio Shalom is a Jewish community radio station based in Paris, France. It broadcasts on 94.8 MHz in a time-sharing agreement with two additional Jewish stations, Radio J and RCJ, from a transmitter in the 17th arrondissement of Paris, atop the Hyatt Regency Paris Étoile. The station, characterized by its pro-peace editorial stance to the Israel–Palestine conflict, is financed by advertising.

== History ==
After the liberalization of French radio in 1981, new stations sprang up across the country, including four Jewish stations in the Paris area. In 1983, the Haute Autorité de la communication audiovisuelle (HACA), then the French broadcast regulator, assigned a single frequency to the four stations, which would share time: Radio Shalom, Radio J, Radio Communauté (renamed RCJ in 1992), and Judaïques FM. The stations reflected different components and points of view of the Jewish community, with Radio Shalom having a "pacifist" and "secular" orientation. Radio Shalom was assigned the time of 4:30 to 9 p.m. for its broadcasts. This made it the only station whose programming was aired in one contiguous block of air time. Despite hours called "restrictive and inconvenient" in a 1996 feature in Le Monde, the station emerged as the most-listened-to of the quartet. In 1995, it absorbed a significant portion of Judaïques FM's operations in the context of serious discord between the 94.8 stations; the Conseil supérieur de l'audiovisuel (CSA) attempted to mediate the dispute but was unsuccessful. Groups close to the various stations called the time-sharing agreement a "congenital flaw" and "radio aberration".

Albert Mallet, the director of Radio Shalom, made several bids in the mid-1990s for a full-time frequency for Radio Shalom in the crowded Parisian frequency spectrum but was unsuccessful. In 1996, the license for Chante France at 90.9 MHz came up for renewal and Radio Shalom presented a competing proposal, but the CSA opted to renew Chante France's license.

In 2000, businessman Robert Assaraf became the majority shareholder of Radio Shalom; the station continued its pro-peace editorial stance and general association with the Peace Now movement. A dispute over an advertisement promoting a pilgrimage to a Tunisian synagogue led to a falling out between Radio J and Radio Shalom, resulting in the latter breaking from the former's advertising management. At this time, Radio Shalom was the only one of the four that had relations with Beur FM, a national station catering to Maghreb communities.

Due to failing health, Robert Assaraf withdrew from management of Radio Shalom in 2014, with control passing to his brother, Roger. That year, the station was placed in receivership due to €1 million in accumulated debt, heralding the start of a difficult two-year period during which many programs were cut back and replaced with music to reduce costs. One host, Lorino, described the ensuing legal battles as an "emotional roller coaster". In 2016, a Paris commercial court ruled in favor of an ownership consortium led by Bernard Abouaf, Pierre Gandus, and Armand Amsellem, which promised to return it to its original mission as an "information radio station focused on Israel and the Middle East".

Other Jewish radio stations in France take programming and news material from the Paris stations.
