= Michel Doury =

French writer and translator (1931–2007)

Michel Doury (1931–2007) was a French writer and translator (in particular Thomas Pynchon, Raymond Chandler, Richard Brautigan and Leonard Cohen). In 1969, he won the Roger Nimier Prize with his work L'indo. In 1988 he was awarded the Prix Mottart by the Académie française.

== Work ==
- 1965: La Paix des braves, Julliard
- 1967: Un matin froid, Christian Bourgois éditeur
- 1968: Le Jardin anglais, Julliard
- 1969: L'Indo, Julliard
- 1971: La Chasse en octobre, Julliard
- 1972: Le Petit Requiem, followed by Pour Déroulède
- 1977: Le Grand Soir, Éditions de la Table ronde
- 1986: Monsieur Léopold, Éditions Balland
- 1987: Vive l'empereur, Éditions Balland
