= Éric Neuhoff =

French novelist and journalist

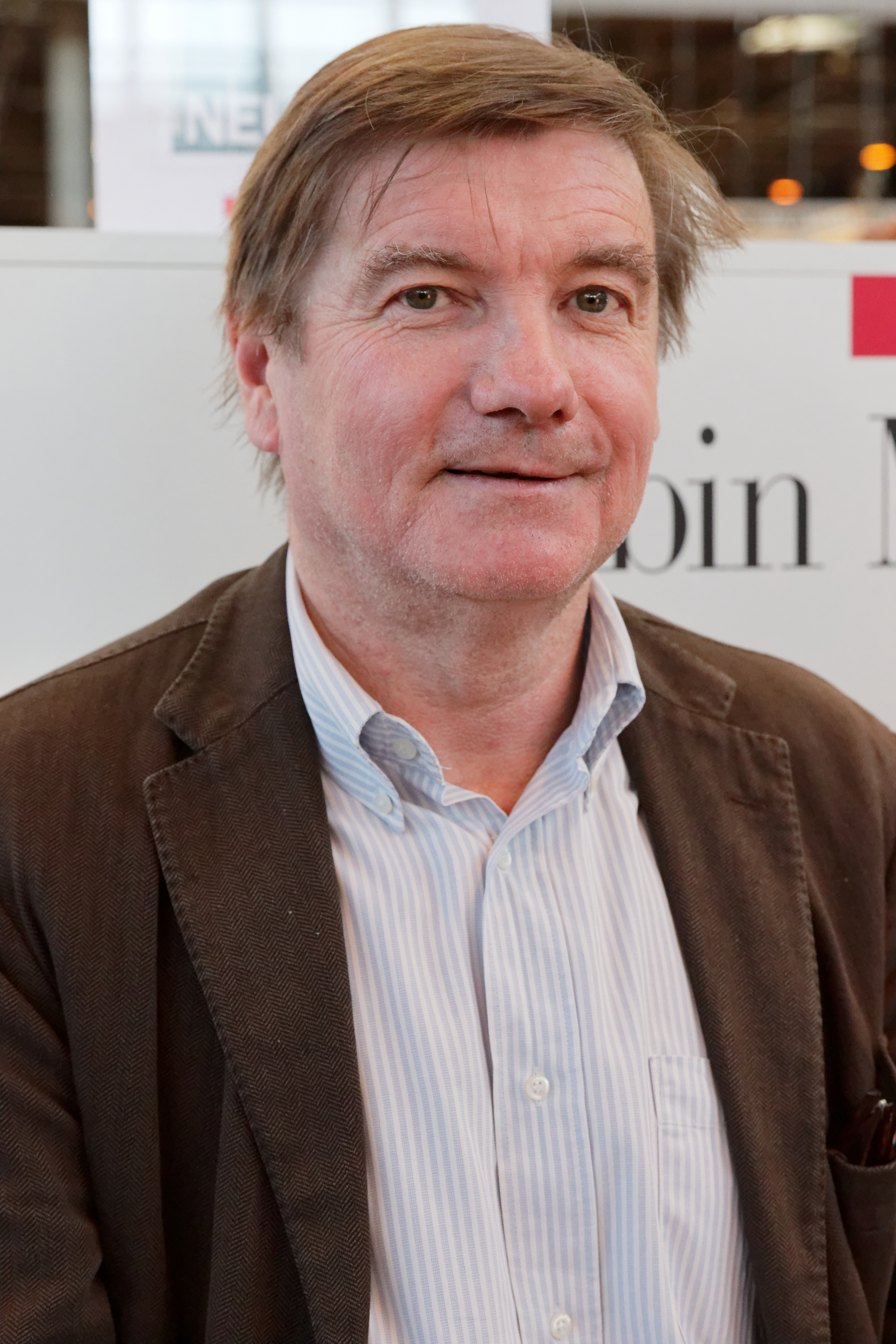
- Neuhoff in 2017
- Born: 4 July 1956 (age 70)
- Occupations: Novelist, journalist
- Writing career
- Movement: Néo-hussard

Éric Neuhoff (born 4 July 1956) is a French novelist and journalist. He debuted in 1982 as a journalist at Le Quotidien de Paris and used a style nicknamed "néo-hussard", after the Hussards movement of the 1950s. He thus became associated with writers such as Denis Tillinac, Patrick Besson and Didier Van Cauwelaert, who debuted around the same time and used a similar style. He received the 1990 Roger Nimier Prize, and has received awards such as the Prix des Deux Magots, Prix Interallié and Grand Prix du roman de l'Académie française.

He has worked as a journalist and film critic for France Inter, Canal+ Cinéma and Madame Figaro. He co-wrote the screenplay for the 2001 film Savage Souls, directed by Raúl Ruiz.

He serves on the jury of the Prix Fitzgerald, a literary prize in the French Riviera where Francis Scott Fitzgerald wrote Tender is the Night.

== Works ==
- 1982: Précautions d'usage, La Table Ronde
- 1984: Un triomphe, Olivier Orban
- 1984: Nos amies les lettres, Olivier Orban
- 1986: Des gens impossibles, La Table Ronde
- 1987: Lettre ouverte à François Truffaut, Albin Michel
- 1989: Les Hanches de Laetitia, Albin Michel, Roger Nimier Prize 1990
- 1992: Actualités françaises, Albin Michel
- 1992: Comme hier, Albin Michel
- 1993: Pas trop près de l'écran (with Patrick Besson), Le Rocher
- 1994: Michel Déon, Le Rocher
- 1995: Barbe à papa, Prix des Deux Magots
- 1997: La Petite Française, Prix Interallié
- 1998: Champagne !, Albin Michel
- 1998: La Séance du mercredi à 14 heures, La Table Ronde
- 2001: Un bien fou, Albin Michel, Grand Prix du roman de l'Académie française
- 2003: Histoire de Frank, Fayard
- 2006: Quand les brasseries se racontent, Albin Michel
- 2007: Pension alimentaire, Albin Michel
- 2009: Les Insoumis, Fayard
- 2012: Mufle, Albin Michel, Prix Trop Virilo 2012
- 2013: Dictionnaire chic du cinéma, Écriture
- 2014: L'amour sur un plateau (de cinéma), L'Herne
- 2015: Dictionnaire chic de la littérature étrangère, Écriture
- 2016: Deux ou trois leçons de snobisme, Écriture
- 2017: Costa Brava, Albin Michel
- 2018: Les Polaroïds, Le Rocher
- 2019: (Très) cher cinéma français, Albin Michel, Prix Renaudot Essai
- 2020: Sur le vif, Le Rocher
- 2022: Rentrée littéraire, Albin Michel
