= Capucine Motte =

Belgian born French woman of letters (born 1971)

Capucine Motte (born 1971) is a Belgian-born French woman of letters. A former lawyer (New York and Paris) and gallerist, she won the 2013 edition of the Roger Nimier Prize.

== Works ==
- La Vraie Vie des jolies filles, Éditions Jean-Claude Lattès, Paris, 2010, 301 p. ISBN 978-2-7096-3456-4 - Prix Contrepoint - 2011
- Apollinaria : une passion russe, Éditions Jean-Claude Lattès, Paris, 2013, 296 p. ISBN 978-2-7096-3631-5 - Prix Roger Nimier 2013
