= Robert Assaraf =

Moroccan historian and writer

- روبرت الصراف
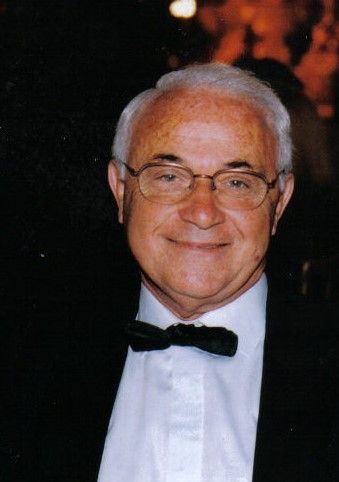
- Robert Assaraf in 2006]
- Born: November 5, 1936; Rabat, Morocco
- Died: March 5, 2018; Ramat HaSharon, Israel
- Occupations: Historian, writer
- Known for: Studies on Moroccan Jewish history

Robert Assaraf (Arabic: روبرت الصراف) (5 November 1936 in Rabat – 5 March 2018 in Ramat HaSharon) was a Moroccan Jewish historian and writer. He resided between Paris, France and Marrakesh, Morocco.

== Career ==
Assaraf began his career in the cabinet of the Ministry of the Interior of Morocco. He then joined the ONA Group, where he became the General Director and Delegate Administrator, until his retirement in 1990. In 1996 he established the Centre International de Recherche sur les Juifs du Maroc and co-founded l’Union mondiale du judaïsme marocain in 1999. He was the President of the Worldwide Moroccan Jewish Union.

Assaraf was also the president of Radio Shalom and was the vice-president of the French magazine Marianne, until 2005 when he sold his shares to Yves de Chaisemartin.

In his lifetime, Assaraf published a number of books the Jewish population of Morocco and the contemporary politics of Israel. A historical survey of the Jewish population in Morocco was published in 2005. In September 2008 he published a survey of the emigration and the Diaspora of the Moroccan Jews.

Towards the end of his life Assaraf relocated to Ramat HaSharon in Israel, where he died on 5 March 2018.

== Books ==
- Juifs du Maroc à travers le monde : Émigration et Identité Retrouvée. Preface by Patrick Girard (Suger Press, 2008)
- Ariel Sharon et ses Batailles Politiques (2006)
- Une Certaine Histoire des Juifs du Maroc : 1860-1999 (2005)
- Le Drame d'Israël: de la paix à la guerre (2001)
- Une Crise des Hommes; Israël, 1995-1999 (Plon, 1999)
- Mohammed V et les Juifs du Maroc à l'époque de Vichy (Plon, 1997)
