= David Le Bailly =

French journalist

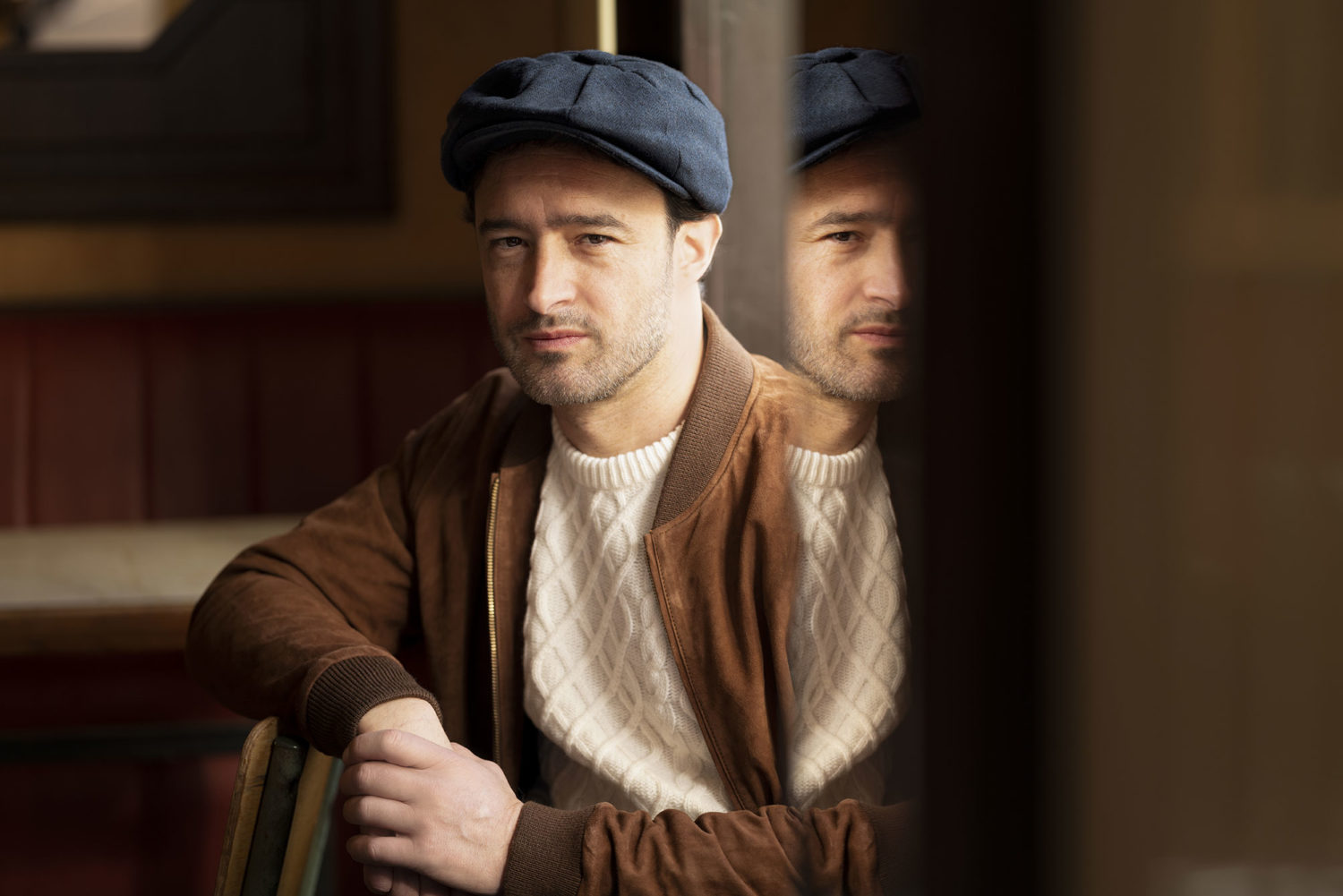
David Le Bailly

David Le Bailly is a French journalist born in Paris.

After working in the economic press (L'AGEFI, La Tribune), David Le Bailly joined the editorial staff at Paris Match in 2002. Specializing in investigations, he worked on the Bettencourt, Karachi and Cahuzac affairs. He also conducted interviews with Roberto Saviano, Mohamed El Baradei, Julian Assange, Boris Berezovsky or Marina Silva. In 2014, he published his first book, La captive de Mitterrand, a novel-investigation on Anne Pingeot, François Mitterrand's shadow companion for more than thirty years. This work earned him the Prix Roger Nimier as well as the Prix Bernard-Mazières du livre politique. In 2014, he left Paris Match to join the editorial staff of L'Obs. He published several investigations, but also reports on France after the 2015 attacks.

== Publications ==
- 2014: La captive de Mitterrand. Paris: Stock. 2014. p. 352. ISBN 978-2234075344.
