= François Sonkin =

French writer

- Born: 14 July 1922
- Died: 24 December 2010 (aged 88)
- Writing career
- Language: French
- Notable work: Un amour de père
- Notable awards: Prix Femina

François Sonkin (14 July 1922 - 24 December 2010) was a French writer, and winner of the Prix Femina, 1978, for Un amour de père.

== Novels ==
- 1964: La Dame
- 1965: Admirable
- 1967: Le Mief
- 1971: Les Gendres, Roger Nimier Prize
- 1978: Un amour de père, Prix Femina
- 1990: Un homme singulier et ordinaire
