= Aude Lancelin =

French journalist (born 1973)

Aude Lancelin (French: [od lɑ̃slɛ̃]; born 7 June 1973, Tours) is a French journalist.

She was previously deputy editor-in-chief at two prominent French weekly magazines: Marianne from 2011 to 2014 and L'Obs from 2014 to 2016. She joined Le Média in 2017 and became its director in July 2018.

== Education ==
Aude Lancelin studied at lycée Henri-IV and then at La Sorbonne. She received an agrégation de philosophie in 1996.

== Career ==
She started her journalistic career in 2000 with Le Nouvel Observateur (also referred to as "L'Obs") where she wrote as a book critic. She interviewed several philosophers, including Alain Badiou, Jean Baudrillard, Jean-Claude Michéa, Peter Sloterdijk, Jacques Rancière and Slavoj Zizek.

She worked from 2011 at Marianne as a deputy editor-in-chief, in charge of the magazine's "Culture" and "Idées" pages.

In 2014, she returned to L'Obs, following the appointment of Matthieu Croissandeau as editor-in-chief. Her termination from the magazine in May 2016 triggered a controversy. She claimed the termination was politically motivated because of her reporting. Forty or so intellectuals published a letter in Libération on 25 May 2016, to protest about her termination, which they qualified as an "intellectual police operation".

She joined Le Média in 2017 and replaced Sophia Chikirou as its director in July 2018.

On 9 April 2019, she posted on Twitter a press release announcing her resignation as President of Le Média and referring to a "coalition [whose] stated goal was to topple the current management team".

== Contributions ==
On 26 July 2011, Aude Lancelin published an article critical of Claudine Tiercelin, then recently appointed at Collège de France. This article triggered an open letter penned by Jacques Bouveresse in support of Claudine Tiercelin.

After leaving L'Obs in May 2016, she denounced the collusion between journalists and politicians in a book entitled "Le Monde Libre". Invited on Jean-Jacques Bourdin's TV show, she accused President Hollande of "managing" the careers of French journalists. She also noted: "Powerful money interests have never been so involved [with the French media]. Mainstream media are at the feet of French largest corporations. The situation in the media is worrying". She laments the managerial approach of the media and the destruction of the ideal of an independent press promoted by the Conseil de la Resistance after WW2. In her opinion, the fact that investors like Patrick Drahi and Xavier Niel are controlling the biggest media holding in France is a democratic earthquake.

In 2017, a few days before the French presidential election, she denounced Emmanuel Macron as a candidate made by French corporate leaders in order to protect their interests. She further accused those leaders of using their controlling interest in the French press to boost Emmanuel Macron's popularity.

== Books ==
- « Histoire d'une réhabilitation », dans Olivier Tinland (dir.), Nietzsche penseur du chaos moderne, Paris, Scali, 2007 ISBN 978-2-35012-113-0
- « Le déclinisme », dans Jérôme Garcin (dir.), Nouvelles Mythologies, Paris, le Seuil, 2007 ISBN 978-2-02-096233-9
- Les Philosophes et l'Amour : aimer de Socrate à Simone de Beauvoir, avec Marie Lemonnier, Paris, Plon, 2008 ISBN 978-2-259-20622-8
- L'Explication : conversation avec Aude Lancelin, avec Alain Badiou et Alain Finkielkraut, Paris, Lignes, 2010 ISBN 978-2-35526-052-0
- Le Monde libre, Paris, Les liens qui libèrent, 2016 ISBN 979-10-209-0460-7, paru en format poche en 2017 chez J'ai lu
- Éloge de la politique, avec Alain Badiou, Paris, Flammarion, 2017 ISBN 978-2-08-135248-3
- La Pensée en otage. S'armer intellectuellement contre les médias dominants, Les Liens qui libèrent, Paris, 2018, 110 p. ISBN 979-10-209-0603-8

== Literary career ==
Aude Lancelin began her literary career on 2/09/2020 with a first "social" novel entitled La Fièvre published by LLL "LES LIENS QUI LIBÈRENT", the action of which takes place in the midst of the yellow vests' revolts. Aude Lancelin signs a committed novel in homage to the true and tragic story of a young man who committed suicide after being sentenced to prison for a paving stone thrown in a demonstration
