= Stéphane Denis =

French journalist and writer

Stéphane Denis (1949, St. Moritz) is a French journalist and writer.

== Biography ==
After working in ministerial offices in the late 1970s, he first worked for Le Quotidien de Paris, then for Paris Match, Marianne and le Figaro. He won the 2001 edition of the prix Interallié for his novel Sisters and the Prix Roger Nimier in 1994 for his work Les événements de 67.

In 1998, he was co-writer of the TV movie Quand un ange passe, realised by Bertrand Van Effenterre.

For several months he was a member of the radio show Les Grosses Têtes by Philippe Bouvard on RTL, in the middle of the 2000s.

He was an unsuccessful candidate for the Académie française in the chair #36 of Jean-François Deniau, in the election of 15 November 2007.

== Works ==
- 1981: La Chute de la maison Giscard, JC Lattès, OCLC 8552366.
- 1982: Sophie, ou, La Rive droite, Lattès, OCLC 11433090.
- 1983: La Leçon d'automne, Albin Michel, ISBN 978-2-2260-1918-9.
- 1985: Le Cœur net, la Table ronde, ISBN 978-2-7103-0249-0.
- 1991: Feu de paille, Fayard, ISBN 978-2-2130-2656-5.
- 1992: L'Amoraliste, Fayard, ISBN 978-2-2130-2907-8.
- 1992: Mitterrand s'en va, Olivier Orban, ISBN 2-85565-780-6, under the pseudonym Manicamp.
- 1993: L'Affaire Poivre, Stock, OCLC 31217999.
- 1994: Les Événements de 67, Plon, ISBN 978-2-2590-2569-0, Prix Roger Nimier
- 1995: Histoire de France, Fayard, ISBN 978-2-2135-9584-9.
- 1996: Les Derniers Jours, Fayard, ISBN 978-2-2135-9727-0.
- 1997: Madame est morte, Fayard, ISBN 978-2-2135-9946-5.
- 1998: Un beau crime, Fayard, ISBN 978-2-2136-0062-8.
- 1998: People, Fayard, ISBN 978-2-2136-0120-5.
- 1998: Le Roman de l'argent, Albin Michel, ISBN 978-2-2260-3384-0.
- 1999: Chambres d'hôtes, Fayard, ISBN 978-2-2136-0443-5.
- 2000: La Grande Forme, Fayard, ISBN 978-2-2136-0650-7.
- 2000: Elle a maigri pour le festival, et d'autres nouvelles des gens célèbres, Fayard, ISBN 978-2-2136-0809-9, (Prix Goncourt de la nouvelle)
- 2001: Sisters, Fayard, ISBN 978-2-2136-0999-7, Prix Interallié
- 2002: Capitaine Troy : une enfance au temps du général, Fayard, ISBN 978-2-2136-1322-2.
- 2003: Charmant garçon, Fayard, ISBN 978-2-2136-1634-6.
- 2004: Les Immeubles Walter, Fayard, ISBN 978-2-2136-2064-0.
- 2004: Un mauvais sujet : chroniques 1993-2003, Fayard, ISBN 978-2-2136-1074-0.
- 2005: Minty, Fayard, ISBN 978-2-2136-2475-4.
- 2005: Chirac s'en va, Éditions Grasset, 2005 ISBN 2-246-69871-5 under the pseudonym Manicamp.
- Pauses, Fayard
1. 2006: L'Enfance de l'art, ISBN 9782213624747
2. 2007: La Lutte des classes, ISBN 9782213629353
3. 2008: La Fin des journaux, ISBN 9782213633664
- 2008: Un espion trop parfait, Fayard, ISBN 9782213634531
- 2009: Un parfait salaud, Grasset, ISBN 978-2-246-74041-4
- 2010: L’Ennemi du bien, Grasset, ISBN 978-2-246-74051-3
- 2013: Les Dormeurs, Grasset, ISBN 978-2-246-80183-2
- 2015: La Tombe de mon père, Grasset, ISBN 978-2-246-81115-2.
