= L'Atelier du roman =

- Discipline: Literature
- Language: French

Publication details
- History: 1993–present
- Frequency: Quarterly

Standard abbreviations
- ISO 4: Atelier Rom.

L'atelier du roman (English: Workshop of the Novel) is a quarterly French literary review founded in Paris in 1993 by the essayist Lakis Proguidis, and currently distributed by Groupe Flammarion and Canadian publisher Boréal.

Writers whose work has appeared in the magazine include Milan Kundera, Martin Amis, Benoît Duteurtre, Philippe Muray, Fernando Arrabal, and Michel Houellebecq.
