= RCJ (radio station) =

Jewish radio station in Paris

Paris; France
- Frequency: 94.8 MHz (shared time)

History
- First air date: 1981
- Former names: Radio Communauté (1981–1992)

Technical information
- ERP: 4 kW
- Transmitter coordinates: 48°52′48″N 2°17′2″E

Links
- Website: radiorcj.info

RCJ (French: Radio de la Communauté Juive, "Jewish Community Radio") is a Jewish radio station broadcasting on 94.8 MHz FM in Paris, France. It is owned by the Association Fonds Social Juif, an affiliate of the Fonds social juif unifié (Unified Jewish Social Fund, FSJU), and broadcasts as one of three Jewish stations sharing the frequency alongside Radio Shalom and Radio J. All three stations are broadcast from a transmitter in the 17th arrondissement of Paris, atop the Hyatt Regency Paris Étoile. Studios are located in the FSJU building in the Rue Broca.

Of the three stations, RCJ is identified as the most institutional and cultural in orientation.

== History ==
After the liberalization of French radio in 1981, new stations sprang up across the country, including four Jewish stations in the Paris area. In 1983, the Haute Autorité de la communication audiovisuelle (HACA), then the French broadcast regulator, ordered the Jewish community radio stations to broadcast to the Paris area in a time sharing agreement: Radio Shalom, Radio J, Radio Communauté, and Judaïques FM. The stations reflected different components and points of view of the Jewish community, with Radio Shalom having a "pacifist" and "secular" orientation. Radio Communauté programs aired from 8:00 to 8:30, 11:00 to 14:00, and 23:00 to 00:00. Groups close to the various stations called the time-sharing agreement a "congenital flaw" and "radio aberration".

After the HACA ordered the time-sharing arrangement, Radio Communauté and Judaïques FM entered into an agreement by which the former would handle most of the latter's management and take most of its program time, leaving Judaïques FM six to seven hours a week to program itself, though it remained a separately authorized station. This arrangement would last for more than a decade; in 1992, Radio Communauté changed its name to RCJ (Radio Communauté–Judaïques FM) as a reflection of the compact. The effect of the agreement was that RCJ programmed nearly half the air time of the frequency. However, a dispute between the two parties led to Judaïques FM breaking off the agreement unilaterally and signing a new one with Radio Shalom. This, in turn, led to RCJ refusing Judaïques the use of its air time. The Conseil supérieur de l'audiovisuel (CSA) attempted to mediate the dispute but failed. In 2014, Radio Shalom relocated to the same floor of the same building as RCJ, retaining its editorial independence.

Other Jewish radio stations in France take programming and news material from the Paris stations. The stations only unite one day a year to carry the Tzedakah Radiothon, benefitting the FSJU.
