= Bernard Chapuis =

French writer and journalist (born 1945)

- Born: 1945 (age 80–81); Algiers, Algeria
- Occupations: Writer; journalist
- Writing career
- Notable awards: Prix Roger Nimier (2005); Prix des Deux Magots (2010)

Bernard Chapuis (born 1945 in Algiers) is a French writer and journalist.

== Biography ==
A journalist working for Combat, he joined Le Canard enchaîné in the 1970s. He later succeeded Robert Escarpit for the daily notes in Le Monde.

In 2005, he won the prix Roger-Nimier for his novel La Vie parlée published by éditions Stock and the prix des Deux Magots in 2010 for Le Rêve entouré d'eau at the same publisher. This novel also earned him the Prix Mottard of the Académie française.

He was named officier in the Ordre des Arts et des Lettres in January 2010.

Chapuis served as a contributing editor at L'Officiel in the early 2010s.

== Works ==
- 1977: Jean Laurain; Bernard Chapuis. L'Éducation populaire ou la Vraie révolution: L'expérience des maisons des jeunes et de la culture. Paris: Éditions de Correspondance municipale. p. 253.
- 1983: Le Moulag: Conversation de nuit. Paris: Éditions Fayard. 1983. p. 246. ISBN 978-2-213-01245-2.
- 1986: Terminus Paris. Paris: Éditions Formes du secret. 1978. p. 185. ISBN 978-2-86301-001-3.
- 1987: Bernard Chapuis; Ermine Herscher (1987). Qualités, objets d'en France. Boulogne-Billancourt, Paris: Éditions Du May. p. 95. ISBN 978-2-906450-14-1.
- 1997: L'Année dernière. Paris: Éditions Stock. 1999. pp. 141. ISBN 978-2-234-05119-5.
- 2005: La Vie parlée. Paris: Éditions Stock. 2005. p. 228. ISBN 978-2-234-05737-1. Prix Roger-Nimier 2005)
- 2006: Vieux garçon. Paris: Éditions Stock. 2007. p. 246. ISBN 978-2-234-05828-6.
- 2009: Le Rêve entouré d'eau. Paris: Éditions Stock. 2009. p. 288. ISBN 978-2-234-06085-2. (Prix des Deux Magots 2010)
- 2012: Onze ans avec Lou. Paris: Éditions Stock. 2012. p. 272. ISBN 978-2-234-07095-0., Prix Jean-Freustié 2012

== Filmography ==
- 2010 : Ensemble, nous allons vivre une très, très grande histoire d'amour... by Pascal Thomas
- 2015 : Valentin Valentin by Pascal Thomas
