= Bessora =

French-Gabonese-Swiss writer

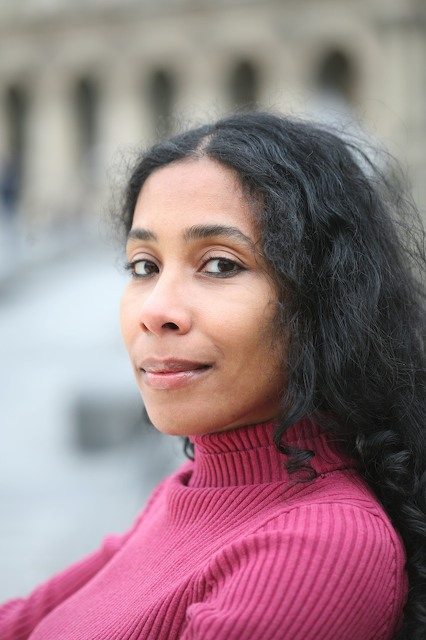
- Bessora at the Louvre in 2007
- Born: 1968 (age 57–58); Brussels, Belgium
- Education: HEC Lausanne; Paris Dauphine University
- Occupations: Novelist, short story writer
- Writing career
- Language: French
- Genre: Fiction
- Notable awards: Fénéon Prize; Grand prix littéraire d'Afrique noire
- Website: www.bessora.fr

Bessora (born 1968, Brussels, Belgium) is a novelist and short story writer. After a career in international finance in Geneva, she studied anthropology and wrote her first novel. Since 1999 Bessora has published a book a year on average, mainly through the publishing group Gallimard. Her books have been translated into several languages. Bessora has been awarded the Fénéon Prize in 2001 for her novel Ink Stains, and the Grand prix littéraire d'Afrique noire in 2007 for her novel Pick Me Pretty Sirs, and the Swiss Literature Prize and Prix Kourouma for Vous, les ancêtres.

== Biography ==
Having first dreamed of being a stewardess, Bessora later attended the HEC Lausanne, and then the Paris Dauphine University. After obtaining a degree in management and a master's degree in applied economics, she worked in finance before changing course. Following a journey in South Africa, she studied anthropology in Paris, before publishing her first novel in 1999. She obtained a doctorate in anthropology in 2002, and continued to write novels. She has been compared to Raymond Queneau, and Nathalie Sarraute.

She was awarded the Fénéon Prize in 2001 for her novel Ink Stains, and the Grand prix littéraire d'Afrique noire in 2007 for her novel Pick Me Pretty Sirs... In 2024 she was awarded a Swiss Literature Prize and the Prix Kourouma for Vous, les ancêtres.

== Selected novels ==
- 53 cm, Le Serpent à Plumes, Paris, 1999
- Les Taches d'encre (Ink Stains), Le Serpent à Plumes, Paris, 2000 – (Fénéon Prize)
- Deux bébés et l'addition (Two Babies and the Bill), Le Serpent à Plumes, Paris, 2002
- Petroleum, Denoël, Paris, 2004
- Cueillez-moi jolis messieurs... (Pick Me Pretty Sirs...), Gallimard, Paris, 2007 – (Grand prix littéraire d'Afrique noire)
- Et si Dieu me demande, dites-Lui que je dors (If God Asks, Tell Him I'm Sleepling), Gallimard, Paris, 2008

== Short stories ==
- 7 secondes plus au nord (7 Seconds North ), Nouvelle Revue Française n° 587, Gallimard, 2008.
- Bionic Woman, Les Balançoires (Ananda Devi (ed.)), éditions Tropiques, Yaoundé, 2006.
- Le cru et le cuit, adaptation of Claude Lévi-Strauss's Le cru et le cuit, in Dernières nouvelles du colonialisme, Vent d'ailleurs, 2006
- Les Compagnies Low-Cost (Low-Cost Companies), in Nouvelles Mythologies, Éditions du Seuil, Paris, 2007
- Courant d'air aux Galeries (Drafts in Galleries), Eden productions, Paris, 2003

== Sources ==
- "Bessora, a Writer with a Thirty-Eight Shoe Size", Adele King, in Wasafiri, 1747–1508, Volume 24, Issue 2, 2009, pp. 60–65.
- "Bessora", in World Literature Today, Volume 75, 77, 79, 81 (2002, 2003, 2005, 2007).
- "Bessora", in The French Review, Eilene Hoft-March, May 2009.
- Bessora, at the Berlin International Literature Festival
