= Prix Roger Nimier =

French literary award

The Roger Nimier Prize (French: 'Prix Roger-Nimier') is a French literature award. It is supposed to go to "a young author whose spirit is in line with the literary works of Roger Nimier". Nimier (1925–1962) was a novelist and a leading member of the Hussards movement. The prize was established in 1963 at the initiative of André Parinaud and Denis Huisman and is handed out annually during the second half of May. It comes with a sum of 5000 euro.

== Recipients ==
- 1963: Jean Freustié for La Passerelle, Éditions Grasset
- 1964: André de Richaud for Je ne suis pas mort, Éditions France-Empire
- 1966: Clément Rosset for Lettre sur les chimpanzés, Éditions Gallimard
- 1967: Éric Ollivier for J'ai cru trop longtemps aux vacances, Éditions Denoël
- 1968: Patrick Modiano for La Place de l'Étoile, Gallimard
- 1969: Michel Doury for L'Indo, Éditions Julliard
- 1970: Robert Quatrepoint for Mort d'un Grec, Denoël
- 1971: François Sonkin for Les Gendres, Denoël
- 1972: ex-aequo Claude Breuer for Une journée un peu chaude, Éditions France-Empire
- 1972: ex-aequo André Thirion for Révolutionnaires sans révolution, Éditions Robert Laffont
- 1973: Inès Cagnati for Le jour de congé, Denoël
- 1974: François Weyergans for Le Pitre, Gallimard
- 1975: Frédéric Musso for La Déesse, La Table Ronde
- 1976: Alexandre Astruc for Ciel de cendres, Éditions du Sagittaire
- 1977: Emil Cioran for all his work
- 1978: Érik Orsenna for La Vie comme à Lausanne, Éditions du Seuil
- 1979: Pascal Sevran for Le Passé supplémentaire, Olivier Orban
- 1980: Gérard Pussey for L'Homme d'intérieur, Denoël
- 1981: Bernard Frank for Solde, Flammarion
- 1982: Jean Rolin for Journal de Gand aux Aléoutiennes, JC Lattès
- 1983: Denis Tillinac for L'Été anglais, Robert Laffont
- 1984: Didier Van Cauwelaert for Poisson d'amour, Seuil
- 1985: Antoine Roblot for Un beau match, La Table Ronde
- 1986: Jacques-Pierre Amette for Confessions d'un enfant gâté, Olivier Orban
- 1987: Alain Dugrand for Une certaine sympathie, JC Lattès
- 1988: Jean-Claude Guillebaud for Le Voyage à Kéren, Arléa
- 1989: Frédéric Berthet for Daimler s'en va, La Table ronde
- 1990: Éric Neuhoff for Les Hanches de Lætitia, Albin Michel
- 1991: Stéphane Hoffmann for Château Bougon, Albin Michel
- 1992: François Taillandier for Les Nuits Racine, Éditions de Fallois
- 1993: Dominique Muller for C'était le paradis, Seuil
- 1994: Stéphane Denis for Les événements de 67, Plon
- 1995: Dominique Noguez for Les Martagons, Gallimard
- 1996: Éric Holder for En compagnie des femmes, Le Dilettante
- 1997: Jean-Paul Kauffmann for La Chambre noire de Longwood: le voyage à Sainte-Hélène, La Table ronde
- 1998: Jérôme Garcin for La Chute de cheval, Gallimard
- 1999: Marc Dugain for The Officers' Ward (La Chambre des officiers), JC Lattès
- 2000: Arnaud Guillon for Écume Palace, Arléa
- 2001: Charles Dantzig for Nos vies hâtives, Grasset
- 2002: Nicolas d'Estienne d'Orves alias Néo for Othon ou l'aurore immobile, Manitoba-Les Belles lettres
- 2003: Marie-Claire Pauwels for Fille à papa, Albin Michel
- 2004: ex-aequo David Foenkinos for Le Potentiel érotique de ma femme, Gallimard
- 2004: ex-aequo Adrien Goetz for La Dormeuse de Naples, Éditions Le Passage
- 2005: Bernard Chapuis for La Vie parlée, Stock
- 2006: Christian Authier for Les liens défaits, Stock
- 2007: Jean-Marc Parisis for Avant, pendant, après, Stock
- 2008: Yannick Haenel for Cercle, L'Infini
- 2009: Xavier Patier for Le silence des termites, La Table Ronde
- 2010: Nelly Alard for Le Crieur de nuit, Gallimard
- 2011: Françoise Dorner for Tartelettes, jarretelles et bigorneaux, Albin Michel
- 2012: Jean-Luc Coatalem for Le Gouverneur d'Antipodia, Le Dilettante
- 2013: Capucine Motte for Apollinaria, JC Lattès
- 2014: David Le Bailly for La Captive de Mitterrand, Stock
- 2015: Émilie de Turckheim for La Disparition du nombril, Héloïse d'Ormesson
- 2016: Paul Greveillac for Les Âmes rouges, Gallimard
- 2017 : Pierre Adrian for Des âmes simples, Equateurs
- 2019 : Arnaud de la Grange for Le Huitième Soir, Gallimard
- 2020 : not attributed
- 2021 : not attributed
- 2022 : Céline Laurens for Là où la caravane passe, Albin Michel
- 2023 : Paul Pavlowitch for Tous immortels, Buchet Chastel
