= Judaïques FM =

Jewish radio station in Paris

Paris; France
- Frequency: 94.8 MHz (shared time)

Ownership
- Owner: Association pour le progrès et le développement des cultures juives (Association for the Progress and Development of Jewish Cultures)

History
- First air date: October 1981
- Last air date: December 2020 (Note: The station technically has separate authority to broadcast but has been integrated into Radio J, which since December 2020 broadcasts across the assigned time for both stations.)

Technical information
- ERP: 4 kW
- Transmitter coordinates: 48°52′48″N 2°17′2″E

Judaïques FM ([ʒy.da.ik ɛf ɛm], "Jewish FM") was a radio station in Paris, France. It broadcast on 94.8 MHz as part of a four-way shared-time arrangement, consisting entirely of Jewish radio stations, between 1981 and 2020. While technically still a separate station with a separate authorization to broadcast, in 2020, it combined for branding and ratings purposes with Radio J, one of the other three stations on the frequency, with all of its programming and personalities being maintained. The stations had been under connected management since 2018.

Within the four-station ensemble, Judaïques FM was intended as the most politically independent of the set and emphasized a multicultural viewpoint. It called itself la radio du judaïsme français ("the radio station of French Judaism"). Historically, it was also one of the smallest stations in terms of resources. For more than a decade, Radio Communauté, renamed RCJ in 1992, handled many of the management functions of Judaïques FM in exchange for most of its allotted air time.

== History ==
After the liberalization of French radio in 1981, new stations sprang up across the country, including four Jewish stations in the Paris area. Judaïques FM was created that October in a split from Radio J and originally had no live programming, relying on recorded music. In 1983, the Haute Autorité de la communication audiovisuelle (HACA), then the French broadcast regulator, ordered the Jewish community radio stations to broadcast to the Paris area in a time sharing agreement: Radio Shalom, Radio J, Radio Communauté (renamed RCJ in 1992), and Judaïques FM. The stations reflected different components and points of view of the Jewish community. Groups close to the various stations called the time-sharing agreement a "congenital flaw" and "radio aberration".

Shortly after the time-sharing agreement was ordered, Judaïques signed a management agreement with Radio Communauté, connecting the two stations seen as more moderate between Radio Shalom and Radio J. Radio Communauté, which renamed itself RCJ (Radio Communauté–Judaïques FM) in 1992 as a reflection of the arrangement, handled most of the management functions and programming for Judaïques, which in turn would directly produce just 6 to 7 hours a week of programming, compared to the six hours a day each group was assigned on the frequency. This also made RCJ the largest broadcaster on the shared frequency.

However, this arrangement unraveled in 1995. Founder Vladimir Spiro found the control of RCJ and its parent, the Fonds social juif unifié (Unified Jewish Social Fund), to be nearly "hegemonic". Tensions peaked on 21 October, when RCJ refused to broadcast the programs of Judaïques FM. Judaïques FM then turned to Radio Shalom for operational assistance. The Conseil supérieur de l'audiovisuel (CSA) attempted to mediate the dispute but failed.

In 2014, Judaïques FM had just two part-time journalists and a corps of volunteers, compared to Radio J's five full-time journalists and two more at Radio Shalom.

=== Consolidation with Radio J ===
In 2018, Marc Eisenberg took operational control of Radio J and Judaïques FM. At that time, both stations moved to the same facilities, though they remained separate for regulatory purposes, and began to share news and other resources.

In 2020, the two stations announced that, with CSA approval, they would combine as Radio J, though still retaining separate operating authority. The combined station would share social media accounts and also be rated as one station by Médiamétrie. All existing programs would remain unchanged. The combined station broadcasts during Radio J's former hours of 4:00 to 8:00 and 14:00 to 16:30 as well as from 8:30 to 11:00, 21:00 to 23:00, and midnight to 2:30, time periods formerly associated with Judaïques FM.
