= Jean-Dominique Merchet =

French journalist working for Marianne (born 1959)

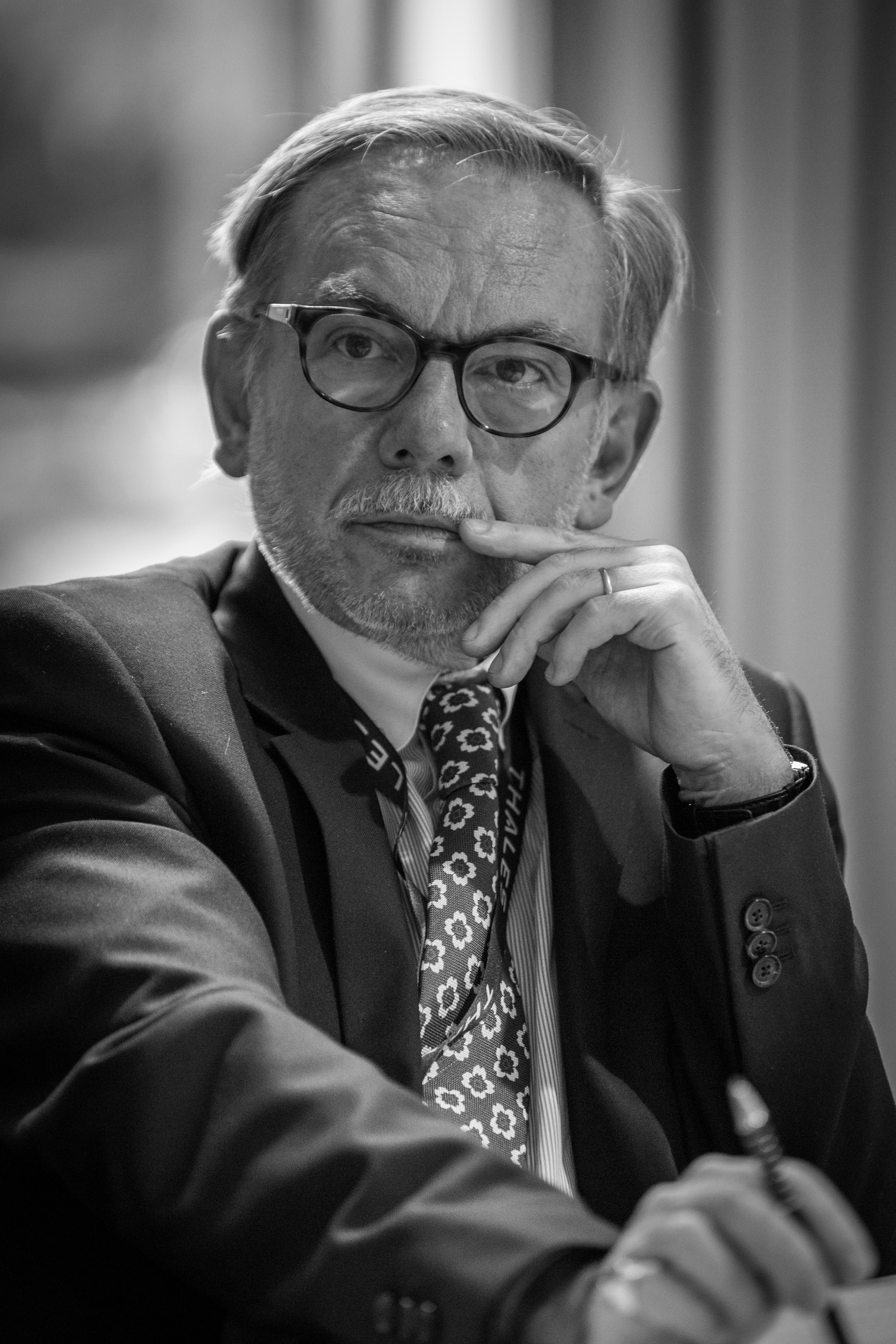
- Born: 26 October 1959; Besançon

Jean-Dominique Merchet (born 26 October 1959 in Besançon) is a French journalist working for the daily newspaper L'Opinion, of which he is the diplomatic and defense correspondent. He specializes in strategy, defense and military issues and often appears on radio and TV shows, notably C'est dans L'air on TV5, as a commentator.

== Biography ==
Merchet started his journalistic career as a columnist for the monthly Le Monde Diplomatique. In the 90s he joined the daily Libération, where he wrote on defense topics. Since July 2007, he has been publishing a professional blog, Secret Défense. He left Libération after the summer of 2010 to join the weekly Marianne where he held the position of deputy editor responsible for international affairs. In July 2013 he joined the newly established L'Opinion as a correspondent for diplomatic and defense issues.

He is an alumnus of the Institute of Advanced Studies in National Defence (49th session).

Merchet notably authored a biography of Caroline Aigle, the first French female fighter pilote, and Mourir pour l'Afghanistan, a book on the Afghanistan War.

== Works ==
- Les Commandos Marine, co-authored with Marie Babey (photos), France Delory, Paris, 1999
- Caroline Aigle, vol brisé, Jacob-Duvernet, Paris, 2007
- Mourir pour l'Afghanistan, Jacob-Duvernet, Paris, 2008
- Défense européenne, la grande illusion, Larousse, coll. "À dire vrai", Paris, 2009
- Une histoire des forces spéciales, Jacob-Duvernet, 2010
- La Mort de Ben Laden, Jacob-Duvernet, 2012
- De la cavalerie aux forces spéciales. l'histoire du 13e RDP. Pierre de Taillac, 2014
- Macron Bonaparte, Stock, 2017
- Sommes-nous prêts pour la guerre ?, Robert Laffont, 2024
