= Xavier Patier =

French Civil Service official and writer

Xavier Patier (5 March 1958, Brive-la-Gaillarde) is a high French Civil Service official and writer.

== Biography ==
Graduated from the Institut d'études politiques de Paris, Xavier Patier is also a former student of the École nationale d'administration (class "Solidarité"). Parallel to his administrative career, marked by several passages in the ministerial chambers, close to Jacques Chirac and Simone Veil, he devoted himself to the writing of his literary work, which earned him several prizes.

He is one of the grandsons of former minister Edmond Michelet.

== Works ==
- 1986: Frère Honorat, Éditions Gallimard
- 1988: Le Juge, Gallimard, Cino Del Duca prize
- 1988: Le Migrateur
- 1990: Point d'orgue, Gallimard
- 1992: Pour en finir avec le travail, essay, La Table ronde
- 1994: Reste avec moi, Gallimard
- 1994: Bientôt nous ne serons plus rien, La Table ronde
- 1995: C'était pas si mal sous Giscard, theatre, La Table ronde
- 1997: Trois minutes de soleil en plus, short stories, La Table ronde
- 1996: Poison, La Table ronde
- 1999: La Foire aux célibataires, La Table ronde
- 2000: Horace à la campagne, Les Belles-Lettres
- 2000: Les Trentenaires, La Table ronde
- 2001: Le Démon de l'acédie, La Table ronde
- 2001: L'Acquitté, La Table ronde
- 2002: La Chasse, essay, Le Cavalier bleu, fondation Sommer prize
- 2002: Chasses à cœur ouvert, with Pierre Moinot, Léon Mazzella and Philippe Verro
- 2003: Laisser-courre, La Table ronde
- 2004: Le Château absolu, La Table ronde
- 2006 Le Roman de Chambord, Éditions du Rocher, Patrimoine littéraire prize of the Prix littéraires Les Lauriers Verts (2006)
- 2008: Le Silence des termites, La Table ronde, Prix Roger Nimier (2009)
- 2010: Un arbre en hiver, éditions Le Promeneur
- 2012: Chaux vive, La Table ronde
- 2014: Blaise Pascal, la nuit de l'extase , Éditions du Cerf, series "Épiphanie"
- 2020: Demain, la France. Tombeaux de Mauriac, Michelet et De Gaulle, Éditions du Cerf.

== Honours ==
- Chevalier of the Ordre national du Mérite
- Chevalier of the Légion d'honneur (2004)

== Distinctions ==
- Corresponding member of the Académie des beaux-arts (elected 21 octobre 2009, section des correspondents libres)
