= Dominique Muller =

French journalist and novelist

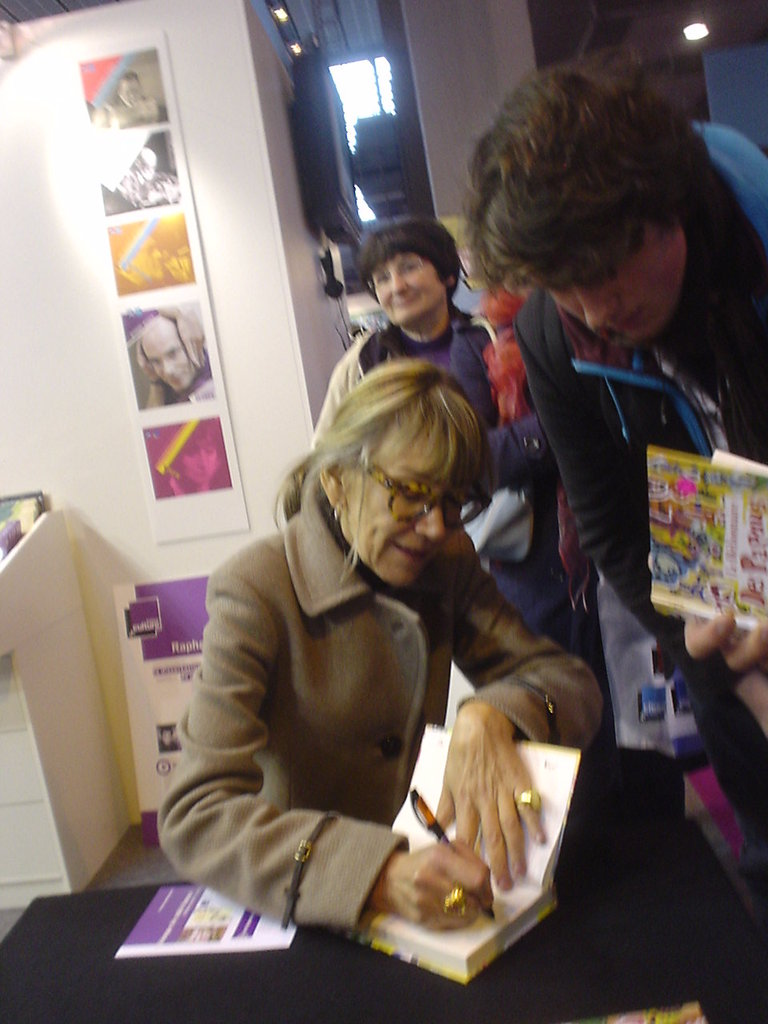
Dominique Muller in 2010

Dominique Muller, real name Dominique Muller-Wakhevitch, (9 August 1949, (Note: Some sources give 9 September 1949 as birthdate.) Strasbourg) is a French journalist and novelist, author of several historical mysteries.

== Biography ==
For several years Dominique Muller was a literary director at the éditions Ramsay. She took part to the Des Papous dans la tête radiko program on France Culture. In 1993 she won the Prix Roger Nimier for C'était le paradis and the Prix du jury Jean-Giono For her autobiographical narration Les Caresses et les Baisers (1998). Les Malgré-nous (2003), which recounts the first Nazi raids in Alsace during the Second World War, obtained a great public success. In "Désormais Venise" (2005), Dominique Muller evokes her passionate love affairs with Maurice Rheims.

In 1999, she launched into the historical detective novel genre with a series whose hero is the doctor Florent Bonnevy, nicknamed Sauve-du-Mal, whose investigations take place under the Régence of Philippe, duc d'Orléans. A rationalist and follower of the ideas advocated by the Encyclopédistes, doctor Florent leaves his native Holland to settle in France. Having become a familiar of the Régent, who does not always trust him, he must hide his Jewish origins from his wife Justine. In Sauve-du-Mal et les tricheurs (1999), he investigates the past of a friend of Justine found dead in a maison close. In Le Culte des dupes (2000), he is the target of a sect worshiping the Egyptian gods who, under this cover, is trafficking young girls in a convent. Very well documented, the series Sauve-du-Mal observes a style in the manner of the writers of the eighteenth century.

In 1989, she was awarded the Prix Mottard of the Académie française for her novel Danger public.

Muller lives in Venice and Paris and now signs her works Dominique Muller-Wakhevitch.

== Work ==
=== novels ===
==== Detective series Sauve-du-Mal ====
- 1999: Sauve-du-Mal et les tricheurs, Paris, 10/18, series "Grands Détectives", No. 3074,ISBN 2264027452.
- 1999: Le Culte des dupes, 10/18, 1999, series "Grands Détectives", No. 3075, ISBN 2264027460.
- 2000: Trop de cabales pour Sauve-du-Mal, 10/18, series "Grands Détectives", No. 3161, ISBN 2264027479.
- 2001: Sauve-du-Mal et l'appât du grain, 10/18, series "Grands Détectives", No. 3291, ISBN 2264031646.
- 2001: Sauve-du-Mal dans l'ombre du tsar, 10/18, series "Grands Détectives", No. 3350, ISBN 2264031646.

==== Other novels ====
- 1986: Brave Petite, Paris, Le Seuil, ISBN 9782020092166.
- 1988: Danger public, Le Seuil, ISBN 2020102889, Prix Mottard of the Académie française
- 1993: C'était le paradis, Le Seuil, ISBN 9782020177412, Prix Roger-Nimier.
- 1995: Le Meilleur de la vie, Fayard, ISBN 2213594767.
- 2000: Les Filles prodigues, Le Seuil, ISBN 2020417855.
- 2001: Les Chapeaux de roues, Le Seuil, ISBN 2020516918.
- 2003: Les Malgré-nous, Le Seuil, ISBN 2020613360.
- 2006: Aimer sans bagages, Le Seuil, ISBN 2020862603.
- 2008: Lire la notice et vivre ensuite, Stock, ISBN 2234061393.
- 2010: Laguna nostra, Robert Laffont, ISBN 2221105397.

=== Autobiographical stories ===
- 1998: Les Caresses et les Baisers, Paris, Le Seuil, ISBN 2020344033.
- 2005: Désormais Venise, Paris, Le Seuil, ISBN 2020685833.

=== Biographies ===
- 1990: Une traînée de poudre: Jeanne Du Barry, la dernière favorite, Paris, JC Lattès.
- 1996: Une reine pas très catholique, biographie d'Anne Boleyn, Paris, NiL Éditions, ISBN 9782290049112

=== Essay ===
- 1998: Demander la lune, Paris, Nil; reprint, Paris, Le Seuil, 1999, series "Points", No. 688, ISBN 2020352966.

== Bibliography ==
- Claude Mesplède [in French] (2007). Dictionnaire des littératures policières. Temps noir (in French). Vol. 2. Nantes: Joseph K. pp. 398–399. ISBN 978-2-910-68645-1. OCLC 315873361..
