= Daniel Schneidermann =

French journalist (born 1958)

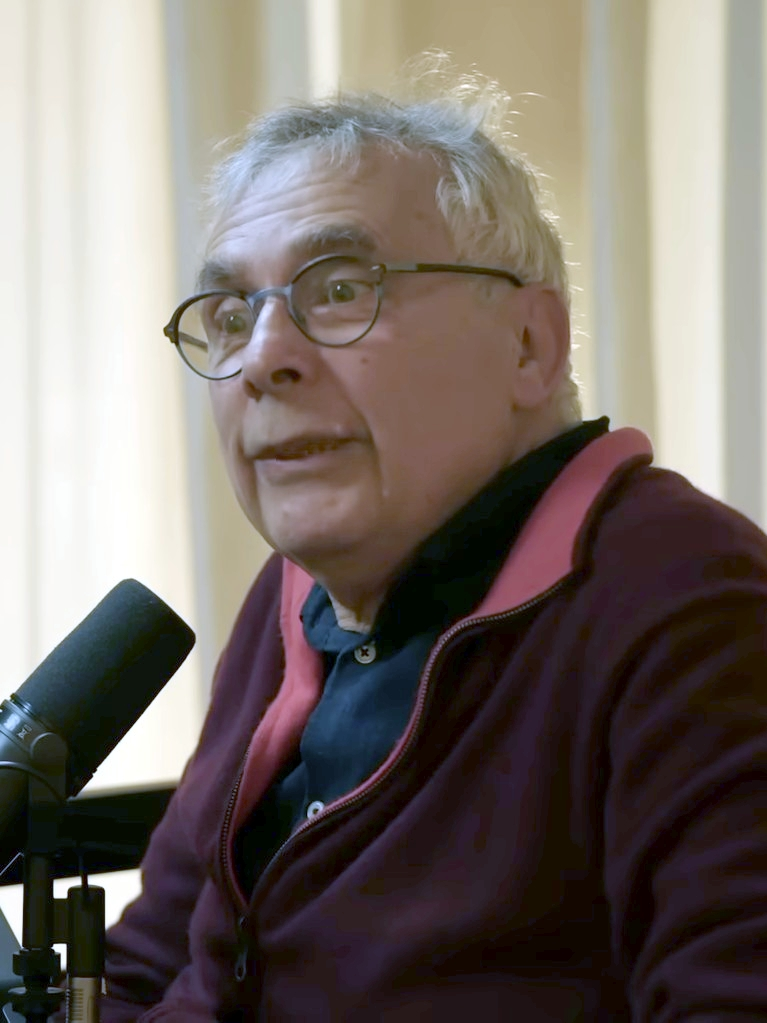
- Schneidermann in 2025
- Born: 5 April 1958 (age 67); Paris, France
- Occupation: Journalist

Daniel Schneidermann (born 5 April 1958, Paris) is a French journalist who focuses on the analysis of televised media. He is mainly active in weekly columns—in the past in Le Monde and presently in Libération and on a video channel: Arrêt sur images (Freeze-frame), formerly broadcast by the public TV channel France 5, but currently financed by subscription. The television show was canceled in 2007 by France 5 direction, an incident that led to the creation of the Arret Sur Images web site.

== Biography ==
After his studies at the Centre de formation des journalistes, Daniel Schneidermann joined the newspaper Le Monde in 1981, where he was made a foreign correspondent in 1983. In 1992, he began writing daily columns on television for Le Monde, critiquing the way in which TV presents information and influences viewers, continuing the tradition of television criticism begun thirty years earlier by writers like François Mauriac or Morvan Lebesque (see, on this subject, the book The Critical Eye - The Television Critic (L'œil critique - Le journaliste critique de télévision) by Jérôme Bourdon and Jean-Michel Frodon.)

In 1995, the success of his written columns allowed him to create a weekly program on France 5 called "Arrêt sur images" ("Freeze-Frame"), which he both produced and moderated. The journalist Pascale Clark anchored the show with him during the first year. The objective of Arrêt sur images is to "decode" television's images and talk, and with the help of diverse columnists and journalists, to analyze the sources and the effectiveness of the narrative use of media. The program tries to use the Internet for the purposes of self-criticism. Each month, an internet "forum-master," who is responsible for following the viewer debates in the internet forum for Arrêt sur images, comes on the show to question Daniel Schneidermann about remarks submitted by the contributors to the site.

Schneidermann wrote weekly columns for Le Monde until October 2003, when he was fired, after the publication of his book The Media Nightmare (Le Cauchemar médiatique), in which he deplored the fact that the management of Le Monde had not responded to criticism directed at them by the authors of the book The Dark Side of Le Monde. In his last column (A Column at Sea or Une chronique à la mer), he related how disappointed and surprised he was by the sanctions of a paper, which vaunts its transparency.

He became a media columnist for the daily newspaper Libération, whose publisher, Serge July, he had derided in 1989 in his book Where are the cameras? (Où sont les caméras ?); notably, July rebuked Schneidermann for having "changed sides."

Schneidermann shows an equal interest in analysis of the internet as a source of data, notably in regard to the development of blogs, and of the Wikipedia website. In 2006, for example, he stated that he considered the development of anonymous biographers and encyclopedists a terrifying prospect.

== Criticism ==
As a media critic, Schneidermann has become the target of criticism, either directed at himself personally or at his show, Freeze-Frame.

=== Pierre Bourdieu ===
A January 20, 1996 Freeze-Frame episode focused on criticism by sociologist Pierre Bourdieu, who was invited to join journalists Jean-Marie Cavada and Guillaume Durand. Bourdieu believed that the show had not actually allowed him to express himself and confirmed his original idea that "television can’t be criticized on television;" Daniel Schneidermann responded that Bourdieu's criticism showed a misunderstanding of how television actually worked. In 1996, Bourdieu published the book "On Television" ("Sur la télévision"), while Schneidermann, in 1999, brought out "About Journalism After Bourdieu" ("Du journalisme après Bourdieu.")

The film Enfin pris? (Caught at last?), directed by the journalist Pierre Carles, who worked with Schneidermann for a short period, features Schneidermann as its protagonist, a character Carles seems to suspect of partiality and denial. The movie is based on scenes from the episode with Pierre Bourdieu, and refers to the fact that, at a later time, the CEO of Vivendi Universal, Jean-Marie Messier was invited to a "Freeze-Frame" show, by himself, where Schneidermann challenged Bourdieu to appear on the program in debate format.

=== Dismissal from Le Monde ===
Besides the controversy surrounding the book The Dark Side of Le Monde (La Face cachée du Monde) by Pierre Péan and Philippe Cohen, Daniel Schneidermann criticized, in his own book The Media Nightmare (Le Cauchemar médiatique) the reaction of the management of the daily paper, stating that they did not respond to the arguments presented in the book. The directors of Le Monde fired him in October 2003 on the grounds of "legitimate and serious cause": according to the paper, a passage in Schneidermann's book was "detrimental to organization for which he works." The journalist took the paper to labor arbitration in Paris, which decided in his favor in May 2005. Le Monde has appealed this decision.

On the other hand, in 2003 Schneidermann himself fired a freelance employee of Arrêt sur images and a moderator of the Internet forum, whom he accused of behavior contrary to the principles of the program. This dismissal was condemned by the courts on May 20, 2005 as abusive because it did not have sufficient cause.

== Quotes ==
On the subject of media frenzy:

"In the maelstrom, all the protagonists get confused, those who speak and those who listen, journalists and readers, witnesses and participants, all spread the same message. The surging river doesn't let anyone get to the shore." (Le Cauchemar médiatique, 2003)

== Bibliography ==
- Tout va très bien, monsieur le ministre ("Everything's just fine, Mr. Minister"), Belfond, 1987, ISBN 2-7144-2069-9.
- Où sont les caméras ? ("Where are the cameras?"), Belfond, 1989, ISBN 2-7144-2308-6.
- Un certain Monsieur Paul, l'affaire Touvier ("A Certain Mr. Paul: the Touvier Affair"), Fayard, 1989 (avec Laurent Greilsamer), ISBN 2-213-59248-9.
- Les Juges parlent ("The Judges Speak"), Fayard, 1992 (avec Laurent Greilsamer), ISBN 2-213-02939-3.
- La Disparue de Sisterane ("The Woman who Disappeared from Sisterane"), Fayard, 1992, ISBN 2-213-02847-8.
- Arrêts sur images ("Freeze-Frames"), Fayard, 1994, ISBN 2-213-59180-6.
- Anxiety Show, Arléa, 1994, ISBN 2-86959-216-7.
- Nos mythologies ("Our Mythologies"), Plon, 1995, ISBN 2-259-18164-3.
- L'Étrange Procès ("The Mysterious Trial"), Fayard, 1998, ISBN 2-213-60104-6.
- Du journalisme après Bourdieu ("Journalism After Bourdieu"), Fayard, 1999, ISBN 2-213-60398-7.
- Les Folies d'Internet ("Internet Follies"), Fayard, 2000, ISBN 2-213-60694-3.
- Où vont les juges ? ("Where are the Judges going?), Fayard, 2002 (avec Laurent Greilsamer), ISBN 2-213-61077-0.
- Le Cauchemar médiatique ("The Media Nightmare"), Denoël, 2003, ISBN 2-07-031704-8.
- Berlin, 1933: la presse internationale face à Hitler, Editions du Seuil, 2018, ISBN 978-2-02-136926-7.

Documentary:

- Kosovo, des journalistes dans la guerre ("Kosovo, journalists in the war") (Arte, 2000, running time: 90 minutes)

== Notes and references ==
The above began as a translation of the French Wikipedia article fr:Daniel Schneidermann.
