= Benoît Duteurtre =

French novelist and essayist (1960–2024)

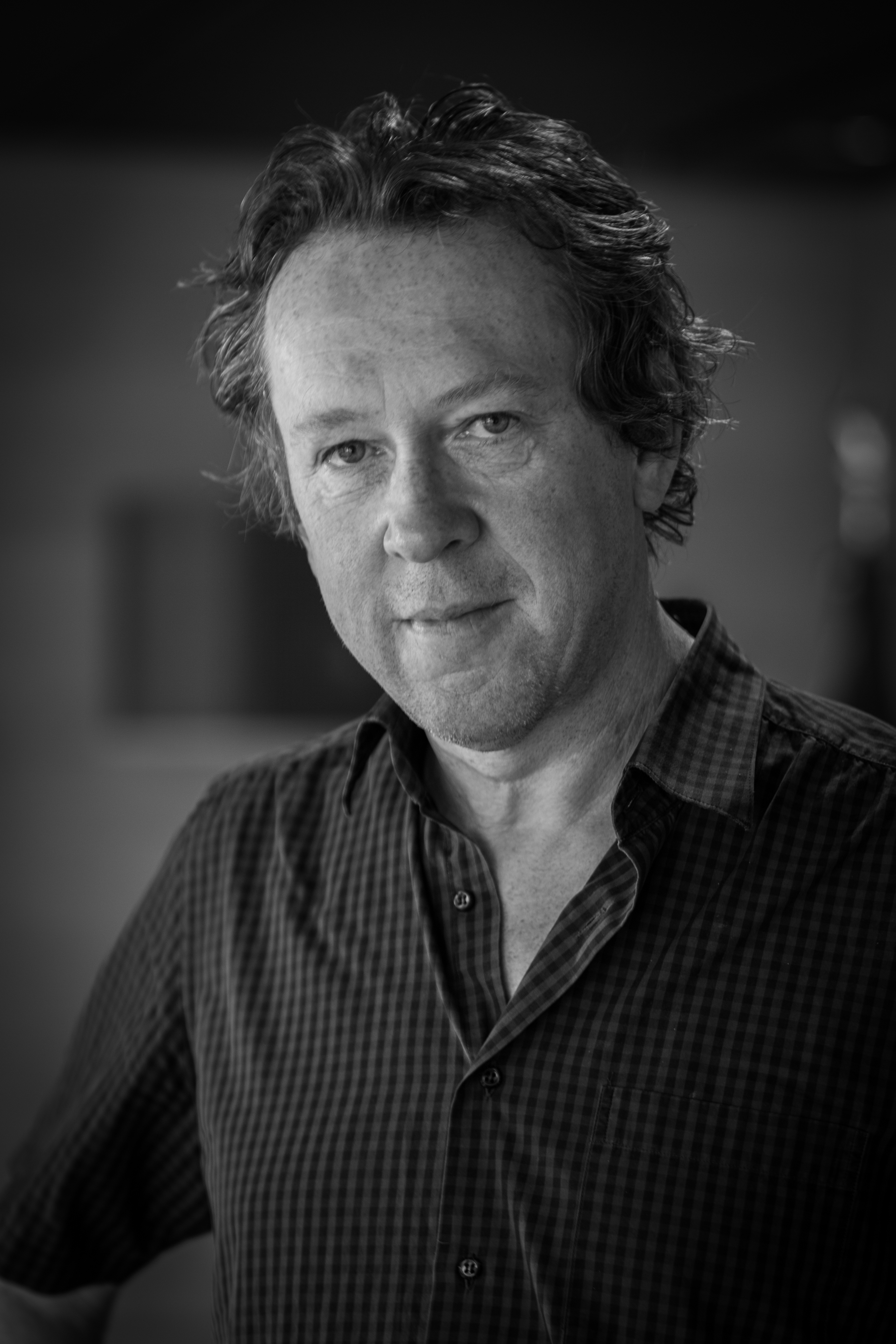
- Duteurtre in 2015
- Born: 20 March 1960; Sainte-Adresse, Seine-Maritime, Upper Normandy, France
- Died: 16 July 2024 (aged 64); Vosges, France
- Occupations: Writer; novelist; critic; musician; producer; host
- Writing career
- Period: 1985–2024

Benoît Duteurtre (French: [dytœʁtʁ]) (20 March 1960 – 16 July 2024) was a French novelist and essayist. He was also a musical critic, musician, producer and host of a radio show about music. He spent his time between Paris, New York and Normandy.

== Background ==
Benoît Duteurtre was born in Sainte-Adresse, Seine-Maritime, Upper Normandy, where he spent his first years. He was the son of Jean-Claude Duteurtre and Marie-Claire Georges. He was also the great-grandson of the French president René Coty. He attended Saint-Joseph, a Catholic educational institution in Le Havre. Duteurtre began to write at an early age. At fifteen, he presented his first texts to Armand Salacrou, a French dramatist established in Le Havre, who encouraged him to pursue his efforts. Le Havre, a heavily destroyed city during World War II and rebuilt in the structural classicism style will often reappear in Duteurtre's later works.

At the age of sixteen, Benoît Duteurtre was fascinated with modern music, especially the work of Pierre Boulez. In 1977, Benoît began musicology studies at the university of Rouen, France. That same year, he met Karlheinz Stockhausen and, a year later, Iannis Xenakis. In 1979, Benoît Duteurtre studied for a month with György Ligeti, whose musical theory later had a strong influence in his life. He graduated with a license in Musicology.

== Life in the early '80s ==
However, Benoît Duteurtre also kept writing. In 1982, he sent Samuel Beckett a text called Nuit (Night); Beckett later convinced Duteurtre to publish it in La Revue des Editions de Minuit. At the time, Duteurtre lived in Paris, occasionally playing piano at the French music festival Le Printemps de Bourges, at the Théâtre Nanterre-Amandiers (in the Paris suburbs), or in a pop music French hit called Paris Latino. After that, he worked as a pollster, as a seller in a bazaar and worked as an accompanist in dance courses. He also wrote articles for the French Playboy magazine.

== The first novels and the early '90s ==
Duteurtre's first novel, Sommeil Perdu, is about a depressed young man leaving his hometown to live in Paris. It was published in 1985, when Duteurtre was a journalist writing for several French newspapers. In 1987, he published his second novel, Les Vaches (completed and renamed À propos des vaches in 2000), which presents the life of a boy growing up between his school year in Le Havre and his holidays in the French mountains. The magazine L'infini also published some of his short stories.

In 1991, Benoît Duteurtre became a music advisor for the Lyon Biennal of French music, and started to host a radio show about music.

L'amoureux malgré lui (1989) started a social study followed by Tout doit disparaître (1992). In this novel Duteurtre relates some personal experiences from his activities as a journalist and music critic. He sent this novel to Guy Debord, who returned a friendly letter with these words "Il vous a suffi de voir le même siècle et sa sorte d'art, vous l'avez ressenti justement" (you only needed to see the same century and its kind of art, you felt it precisely). Tout doit disparaître also revealed some of Duteurtre's questions about contemporary music, especially wondering about what happened to French classical music in the late 20th century and why European contemporary music is unable to attract a large audience. These ideas would later be thoroughly developed in his essay Requiem pour une avant-garde.

Duteurtre discovered New York in 1990 and was charmed. This experience improved his understanding of the behaviour of France towards the USA. In 1993, he helped to revive the French musical collection Solfège (DuSeuil).

== Requiem pour une avant-garde ==
Requiem pour une avant-garde, an essay published in 1995 analyzing and criticizing the institutionalization of contemporary music in France, triggered fierce criticism from some French newspapers. A journalist for the well-known French newspaper Le Monde published an article comparing Duteurtre to Robert Faurisson, a revisionist. Duteurtre sued the newspaper and won. Le Monde was forced to publish Duteurtre's answer. Supports came from several French newspapers and magazines (Le Point, Le Monde de la musique, Diapason) and from the International Herald Tribune newspaper.

Though the criticism of the work and the influence of Pierre Boulez as a composer is one of the main components of this essay, Duteurtre also put forward the problem of France's current nostalgia for its artistic leadership during the Belle Epoque in the late 19th-early 20th century. This idea would reappear later in some of his novels.

== Late 1990s works ==
In 1995, Marcel Landowski and Duteurtre created an association Musique Nouvelle en Liberté (New Music in Liberty) to promote new composers.

In 1996, Duteurtre published the novel Gaieté parisienne, about the Paris gay community. The novel also portrays an almost 30-year-old man worried about the from now on known-pattern of his own life. Drôle de temps, a series of six short stories published in 1997 received the Prix de l'Académie Française (French Academy Award). Milan Kundera was seduced and wrote a friendly article which concurs with another fan of Duteurtre, Philippe Muray, on important ideas about the role of a writer in the modern world.

In 1999 was published the novel Les malentendus, which details a series of crossed courses involving a young Arab immigrant in France, a company head woman, a young man who had graduated from Science-po, and a disabled gay middle-aged man. In 2001 the novel Le Voyage en France was awarded the Prix Médicis (Medicis award). In this last novel a young American, fond of the late 19th-early 20th century France discovers the modern France and in the same time, interlinked, the course of a middle-aged man spending his life between euphoria and depression.

Service Clientèle (2003) is a series of short chapters related to commercial or technical assistances of companies selling cellulars, flight tickets and Internet connexions. This last work was kindly noted by François Taillandier in the French newspaper L'Humanité. La Rebelle was published in 2004 and portrays a female TV show host, left-leaning but nevertheless careerist and the plot which involves her, a young Egypt-born gay computer engineer, an old swindler and a big French company CEO.

Jérôme Savary's music-hall comedy Viva l'Opéra-Comique, whose texts were written by Duteurtre was premiered at Théâtre national de l'Opéra-Comique, Paris, in March 2004.

In 2005, La petite fille et la cigarette (The Little Girl And the Cigarette) was published, describing the horrible and slow chains of events by which a state employee will switch from a rather quiet life to the most horrible situation.

Duteurtre's novel Chemin de fer was published in 2006 and tells the story of a fifty-year-old woman divided between her career in Paris and her love for a small old-fashioned countryside house in the mountains. This latest novel is also a reflection of the evolution of our society and the so-called progress people have to adapt.

He also wrote for the French literature magazine L'Atelier du Roman with authors like Milan Kundera and Michel Houellebecq. In April 2007 he wrote in this magazine an article for the death birthday of Philippe Muray, titled Muray est une fête (Muray is a feast).

In his last novel "La cité heureuse", published in August 2007, a big company (in French La Compagnie) acquired a whole city and turned it into a cultural theme park. Its inhabitants work as activity leaders. One of them, a TV series scriptwriter tries to adapt to this new life. Also published in 2007 "Ma belle époque", a collection of texts issued in different French newspapers, compose what Duteurtre thought to be like a self-portrait of himself.

In 2009, he signed a petition in support of Roman Polanski, calling for his release after Polanski was arrested in Switzerland in relation to his 1977 charge for drugging and raping a 13-year-old girl.

== Later life and death ==
Benoît Duteurtre was latterly a journalist writing for several French newspapers such as Marianne, le Figaro and Paris-Match and presented a radio show producer for France Musique, a French public radio. He was also a member of the publisher Editions Denoël's reading committee. His books have been translated into fifteen languages. Duteurtre worked with the actress Fanny Ardant on Véronique, an operetta from André Messager for January 2008.

Duteurtre died in Vosges on 16 July 2024, at the age of 64.

== Bibliography ==
=== Novels ===
- (1985) Sommeil Perdu
- (1987) Les vaches
- (1989) L'amoureux malgré lui
- (1992) Tout doit disparaître
- (1996) Gaieté parisienne
- (1997) Drôle de temps
- (1999) Les malentendus
- (2000) À propos des vaches
- (2001) Le voyage en France
- (2003) Service Clientèle
- (2004) La Rebelle
- (2005) La petite fille et la cigarette
- (2006) Chemin de fer
- (2007) La Cité heureuse
- (2008) Les Pieds dans l'eau
- (2009) Ballets roses
- (2010) Le Retour du Général
- (2011) L'Été 76
- (2012) À nous deux, Paris !
- (2014) L'Ordinateur du Paradis
- (2016) Livre pour adultes
- (2018) En marche !
- (2021) Ma Vie Extraordinaire
- (2022) Dénoncez-Vous Les Uns Les Autres
- (2024) Le Grand Rafraîchissement

=== Essays ===
- (1995) Requiem pour une avant-garde
- (1997) L'opérette en France
- (2002) Le grand embouteillage
- (2007) Ma belle époque
- (2013) Polémiques
- (2015) La nostalgie des buffets de gare
- (2017) Pourquoi je préfère rester chez moi

=== Papers and short stories in ===
- Revues Minuit
- L'Infini
- L'Atelier du roman
- Nouvelle revue française
- Le débat
- Revue des deux mondes
- NRV
- Commentaire

=== Common books under the direction of Duteurtre ===
- (1991) 150 ans de musique française
- (2002) Un siècle d'Opéra
- (2003) Paris, capitale de la musique, 1850–1950
- (2003) André Messager
