= Bloy =

Bloy is a surname. Notable people with the surname include:

- Francis Bloy (1904–1993), the Episcopal Bishop of Los Angeles between 1948 and 1974
- Harry Bloy (born 1946), former BC Liberal Member of the Legislative Assembly in the province of British Columbia, Canada
- Léon Bloy (1846–1917), French novelist, essayist, pamphleteer and poet
