= Denis Tillinac =

French writer (1947–2020)

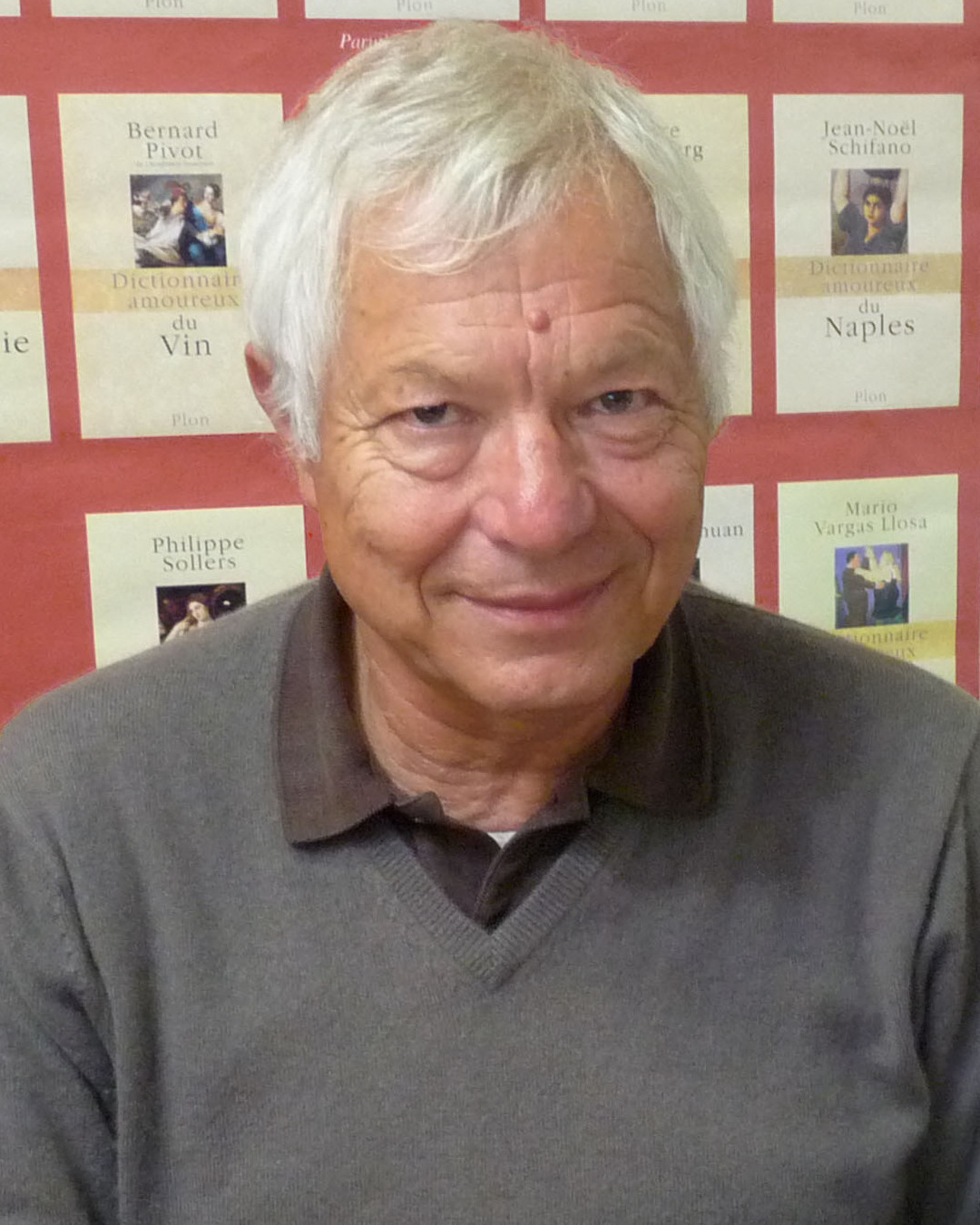
- Denis Tillinac in 2009
- Born: 26 May 1947; Paris, France
- Died: 26 September 2020 (aged 73); Vosne-Romanée, Côte-d'Or, France
- Education: Institut d'études politiques de Bordeaux
- Occupations: Journalist; Writer

Denis Tillinac (26 May 1947 – 26 September 2020) was a French writer and journalist.

== Biography ==
As a writer, he received the following literary prizes: Prix de la Table ronde française (1982), Prix Roger Nimier (1983), Prix Kléber-Haedens (1987), Prix Jacques-Chardonne (1990), Prix du roman populiste (1993), Grand prix de littérature sportive (1993), Prix Paul-Léautaud (1999).

He served as Jacques Chirac's personal representative to the Permanent Council of the Francophonie from 1995 to 1998.

He wrote a weekly column in Valeurs actuelles.

In 2007, the Ministry of Foreign Affairs had proposed his name for the post of ambassador to the Holy See. This proposal was not approved by the Vatican, because Denis Tillinac was divorced.

In 2008, he became head of the humanities division of the scientific council of the ISMaPP.

He was close to Jacques Chirac. In 2012, he wrote an open letter to Marine Le Pen to ask her to support Nicolas Sarkozy in the second round of the presidential election.

He was a Catholic and wrote books about the Catholic origins of France.

Tillinac died on 26 September 2020 at the age of 73.

== List of publications ==
- Les Corréziens, (with Pierre Dauzier, Robert Laffont, 1991)
- En désespoir de causes
- Le mystère Simenon
- L'Ange du désordre
- Elvis : Balade sudiste
- Je nous revois...
- Le Bonheur à Souillac
- Le rêveur d'Amériques
- Sur les pas de Chateaubriand
- Boulevard des Maréchaux
- L'Irlandaise du Dakar
- Chirac le Gaulois
- Le Jeu et la Chandelle (1994)
- Dernier verre au Danton (1996)
- Don Juan (1998)
- Ou va le monde? (co-author with Alain Finkielkraut and Jean-Claude Guillebaud, 2000)
- Le Dieu de nos pères, défense du catholicisme (Bayard Presse, 2004)
- Dictionnaire amoureux de la France (with Alain Bouldouyre, Plon, 2008)
- Rue Corneille (Editions de La Table Ronde, 2009)
- Femmes de guerre, texte in Inconnues corréziennes, résonances d'écrivains. (co-author, Editions Libel, 2009)
- Dictionnaire amoureux du catholicisme (Plon, 2011)
- Considérations inactuelles (Plon, 2012)
