= Jean-Claude Guillebaud =

French writer (1944–2025)

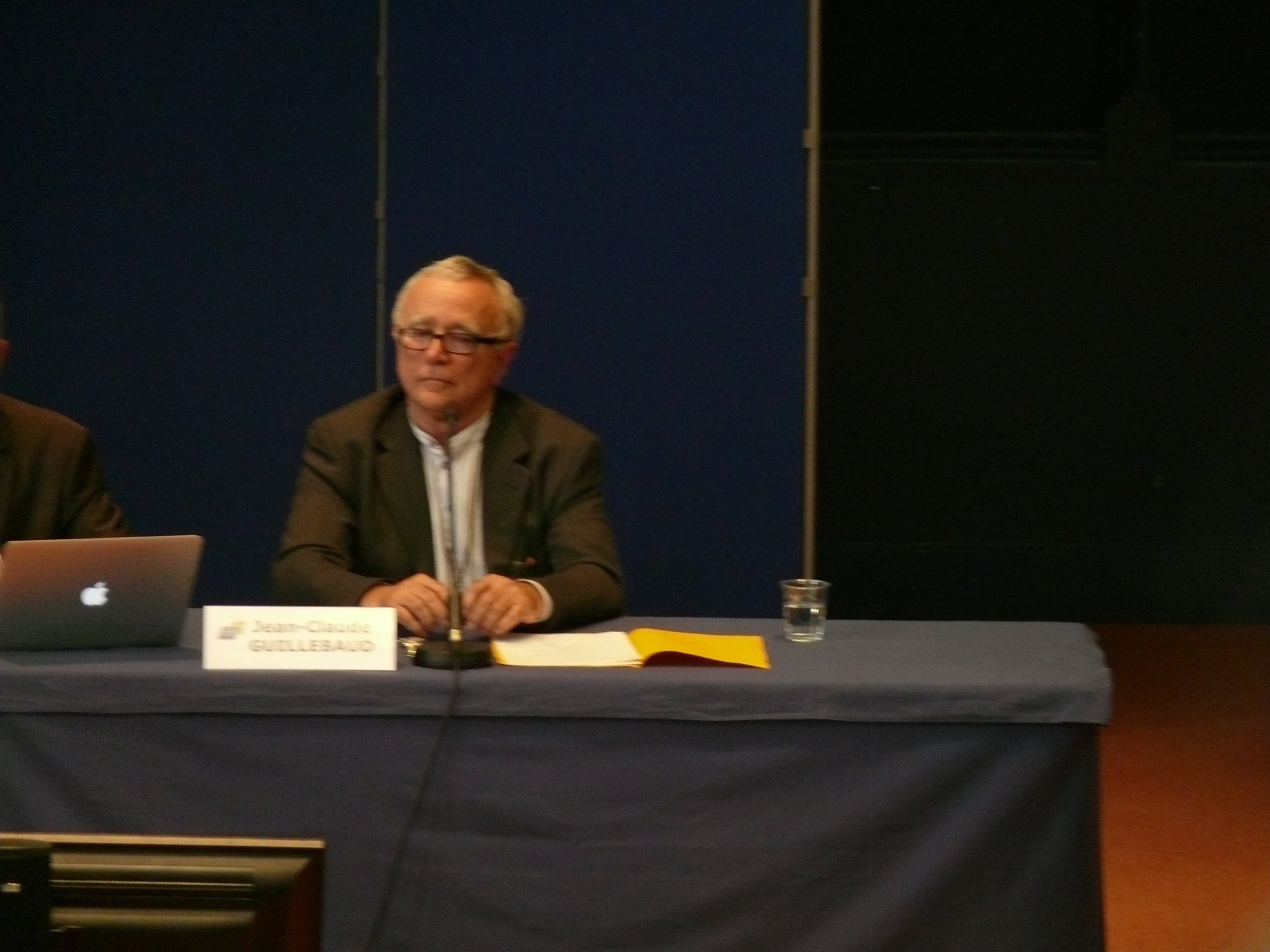
- Guillebaud in 2014
- Born: 21 May 1944; Algiers, French Algeria
- Died: 8 November 2025 (aged 81); Angoulême, France
- Occupation: Journalist
- Employer: La Vie

Jean-Claude Guillebaud (21 May 1944 – 8 November 2025) was a French writer, essayist, lecturer and journalist.

== Life and career ==
A journalist at the daily Sud Ouest, then at the newspaper Le Monde and the weekly Le Nouvel Observateur, Jean-Claude Guillebaud also directed the organisation Reporters Without Borders. In 1972 he was the recipient of the Prix Albert-Londres. He was a member of the sponsorship committee of the Coordination française pour la Décennie of the culture of peace and non-violence. In 2005, Guillebaud published La force de conviction. He kept a weekly column on the life of the media in the television supplement of Le Nouvel Observateur before replacing Jacques Julliard as columnist at Le Nouvel Observateur from November 2010. He also kept a chronicle of observation of French society and politics in the Catholic weekly La Vie. Since June 2008, he was a member of the supervisory board of the press group Bayard Presse. In 2016, he presided the 23rd Prix Bayeux-Calvados des correspondants de guerre.

Guillebaud died in Angoulême on 8 November 2025, at the age of 81.

== Writings ==
- 1969: Chaban-Delmas ou l'art d'être heureux en politique, Éditions Grasset
- 1974: Les Jours terribles d'Israël, Éditions du Seuil
- 1976: Les Confettis de l'Empire, Seuil
- 1978: Les Années orphelines, 1968-1978, Seuil
- 1980: Un voyage vers l'Asie, Seuil
- 1980: Un voyage en Océanie, Seuil
- 1988: Le Voyage à Kéren, Arléa, Prix Roger Nimier ISBN 2-86959-027-X
- 1993: La Colline des Anges : Retour au Viêt Nam with Raymond Depardon, Seuil
- 1995: La Trahison des Lumières : enquête sur le désarroi contemporain, Seuil, Jean-Jacques Rousseau ISBN 2-02-023447-5
- 1998: La Tyrannie du plaisir, Seuil, Prix Renaudot Essai ISBN 2-02-028949-0
- 1999: La Refondation du monde, Seuil, ISBN 2-02-036134-5
- 2001: Le Principe d'humanité, Seuil, ISBN 2-02-047434-4, Prix européen de l'essai Charles Veillon
- 2002: L'Esprit du lieu, Arléa
- 2003: Le Goût de l'avenir, Seuil, ISBN 2-02-054761-9
- 2005: La force de conviction : à quoi pouvons-nous croire ?, Seuil, ISBN 2-286-01245-8
- 2007: Comment je suis redevenu chrétien, Seuil, ISBN 9782757807019
- 2007: Figures à Cordouan by Pierre-Henri Simon, preface, Le Croît Vif
- 2009: La confusion des valeurs, ISBN 978-2-220-06105-4
- 2008: Le Commencement d'un monde, Seuil, ISBN 9782020967075
- 2010: Sont-ils morts pour rien ? : Un demi-siècle d'assassinats politiques, with Jean Lacouture, Seuil ISBN 978-2020998321
- 2011: La vie vivante, Éditions Les Arènes, ISBN 978-2-3520-4139-9
- 2011: Le Goût de l'avenir, Seuil, ISBN 978-2-020-92739-0
- 2011: Le Deuxième Déluge, Éditions Desclée de Brouwer, ISBN 978-2-220-06345-4
- 2012: Une autre vie est possible, Éditions L'iconoclaste, ISBN 978-2-91336-646-6
- 2013: Je n'ai plus peur, Éditions L'iconoclaste, ISBN 978-2-913366-62-6
- 2016: Le tourment de la guerre, Éditions L'iconoclaste
