= Arrêt sur images =

Logo

Arrêt sur images ("Freeze-frame", also abbreviated as the acronym ASI) was initially a weekly French television program, created and presented by journalist Daniel Schneidermann and broadcast on La Cinquième from 1995 (renamed France 5 in January 2002) to 2007 and produced by Carrere group. Funding for the show ceased in 2007 on Philippe Vilamitjana's decision.

After being taken off the air, Schneidermann created a website, @rrêt sur images (also known by the acronym @SI). A provisional form of the web site was in place by September 2007, a more-definitive one was in place by January 2008. The internet subscription campaign launched on this occasion was a success, despite minimal mainstream media coverage.

From 2008 until 2014, Arrêt sur images chose to pay only 2.1% in VAT as the law imposes on the print press. In 2014 the French legislature voted that on-line sites would henceforth be indeed taxed at this rate, but the tax authority continued to demand six years back taxes at the higher rate of 19.7%. In the end, the National assembly voted to forgive the debt (of 540,000 €) in December 2015.

Since 2008 a television channel, Arretsurimages.tv, which broadcasts the weekly debate led by Daniel Schneidermann, the literary program (D@ns le texte) presented most often by Judith Bernard, the program @ux Sources by Maja Neskovic and a program on the television series and films launched in October 2012, @u prochain épisode, hosted by film columnist Rafik Djoumi. The team launched an iPhone application in early November 2009, an Android app in October 2010 and an application for tablet computers in December 2011. All these applications were developed by an @sinaute (the name given to a paying subscriber to the @rrêt sur images website). They provide access to site content directly on compatible devices.

== Media critique ==
"The principal vocation of @rrêt sur images is reflecting critically on media."

== Notable guests ==
Notable guests on the program have included politician and former minister Jean-Pierre Chevènement, economist Frédéric Lordon, economist Jacques Sapir, Éric Coquerel (political coordinator of the Left Front party), politician and former minister Jean-Luc Mélenchon, filmmaker François Ruffin, also editor-in-chief of Fakir, sociologist Pierre Bourdieu, former Charlie Hebdo satirist Luz. Schneidermann's guests are not always famous and have included secondary-school teachers, political anthropologists, union, and religious leaders.

== The @si team ==
- Producer, @rrêt sur Images program host and columnist: Daniel Schneidermann;
- Current permanent journalists: Gilles Klein (present since the creation of the @SI site, generalist with specialization in general French journals and foreign press), Sébastien Rochat (generalist specialized in pensions since January 2010), Laure Daussy (generalist since March 2010) and David Medioni (editor since January 2013);
- Other presenters / hosts: Judith Bernard for the program D@ns le Texte (program that turns on the occasion into the program D@ns le Film). From March 2009 to May 2011, Guy Birenbaum presented the program Ligne J@une. During the summer of 2009, Anne-Sophie Jacques, Alain Korkos, Maja Neskovic and Laurence Lacour have exceptionally animated the emissions @rrêt sur Images. During the summer of 2010, Anne-Sophie Jacques has re-enlisted this role for a few emissions. Since September 2011, she hosts a monthly program focused on the economy with Daniel Schneidermann;
- Writers, columnists current or recent, in writing and / or text in programs (were all present at least once on a platter, but Sherlock): Judith Bernard (social criticism chronic), Anne-Sophie Jacques (etymological chronic and economic chronic), Alain Korkos (image analysis chronic, left the team in early September 2010 after a pay dispute to finally return in February 2011), Dan Israel (general journalist) left the team in November 2012 while he was there from the beginning of the project, Didier Porte (video humor chronic, since July 2010), the mysterious Sherlock Com' (termination / explanation of communication plans), Rafik Djoumi (since May 2010 column on film or television), Maja Neskovic (which is set in a "short" version of ten minutes of her show @ux Sources);
- Technical team: François Rose (emissions production), Marion Harrington (librarian), Mireille Campourcy (webmaster), Les Points Sonneurs (sound engineers).
