= Philippe Muray =

French essayist and novelist (1945-2006)

Philippe Muray (1945 in Angers (France) – March 2, 2006 in Paris) was a French essayist and novelist. None of his works have yet been translated into English. In 2010, the French actor Fabrice Luchini read some of Muray's works at the Théâtre de l'Atelier in Paris, which contributed to a renewed discussion of his writings in the French press. His views had a real impact on the public discussion about modernity.

== Biography ==
Muray's father was a writer and translator of English-language authors (Jack London, Melville, Kipling, etc.) and his mother a devout reader. According to Muray himself, his parents contributed significantly to his literary education and taste of literature. As soon as he could, he started to study humanities in Paris.

During some months in 1983, he taught French literature at Stanford University in California. There he developed the concept of L'empire du bien (the Empire of the Good), and he collected materials to write his book Le XIXe siècle à travers les âges (The 19th Century through the Ages), published in 1984. In that book he underlines the importance of occultism in the formation of socialism.

He also published an essay about Céline, in which he tried to explain the fierce antisemitism of the physician and critically acclaimed author of Journey to the End of the Night. Muray went on to argue that Céline's antisemitism was partly a consequence of his hygienist beliefs – as did the Nazis, Céline believed that the Jews where both an obstacle to progress and a social illness.

Philippe Muray died on 2 March 2006 of lung cancer and is buried at the Montparnasse Cemetery in Paris.

== Writing ==
An exceptional literary stylist and novelist, Philippe Muray published many an article and essay in various French magazines such as L'Atelier du roman, criticizing what he saw as the absurdities and anomalies of the modern world. A philosopher and an artist, he described the major upheavals that have led to the modern-day way of life, trying to show how some aspects of modernity such as jihadists and neofascists wholly embraced the views of those they opposed.

A satirist, he often wrote in a polemical tone, and his perspective is sometimes classified as that of a cultural antimodernist or even reactionary, though Muray did not qualify himself as such. He also wrote various works of fiction, mostly under pseudonyms, of which most are not yet known. Some of his best-known works, Postérité, Rubens's Glory, On ferme, Square Wheels, Spiritual Exorcisims, L'empire du bien, Dear Jihadi, Minimum Respect, and Festivus Festivus, have yet to be published in English.

Muray's writing style is often detailed, insistent, and comical. A productive intellectual who described himself as a student of Louis Ferdinand Céline, Balzac, Bloy, Bernanos, and Péguy, he coined numerous neologisms, mostly pejorative, such as "Mutin de Panurge" (any credulous person who believes himself a rebel and freethinker while following and enforcing the latest trends of the day), "Artistocrate" (an artist who is completely aligned with the political power structure of the day and whose artistic activity becomes that of a charge, as under the Ancien Régime), and "Rebellocrate" (a person who pretends to be radical but is in fact allied with the power structure). The last is in some way akin to the concept of "recuperation". Notably, he referred – tongue in cheek – to the new form of Homo Sapiens, devoted to pleasure and personal fulfillment, as "Homo Festivus."

Thought first and foremost a novelist whose intent was to describe the mores of his day and their consequences, Muray was also an intellectual interested in major political and cultural changes. In his non-fiction work The 21st Century throughout the Ages, Muray went on to explain how the gradual fall of the Church in Europe after the French Revolution gave rise, in its place, to a wave of occultism, protosocialist, and parapsychology ideologies. These ideologies are for Muray the root and stem of the major political movements that flourished in the 20th century and still dominate modern-day life – i.e. feminism, marxisim, fascism, environmentalism, etc. For Muray, intellectuals such as Auguste Comte, Jules Michelet, Victor Hugo, Allan Kardec, Freud, Helena Blavatsky, Emile Zola, Lenin, Adolf Hitler, Foucault, and far-right thinkers such as Edouard Drumont were all proponents of some kind of occultism that manifested itself through different "brands" of "socialist" beliefs (though Muray nuanced his proposal: according to him some of these public figures also held views that also went against occultism, as in the case of Sigmund Freud). Muray went on to comment that the movement inspired French thinkers to hope for a regeneration of the human being in a form adapted to life in a Utopian society. This "New Man", stripped of his primordial defects, it was hoped, would be able to put the theories of socialists such as Karl Marx and Benito Mussolini into practice.

== Criticism ==
In 2002, Daniel Lindenberg included Muray in his list of "new reactionaries", along with Michel Houellebecq, Maurice Dantec, Alain Badiou, Alain Finkielkraut, and others. It has been demonstrated by Muray that Daniel Lindenberg had not read his works.

Muray was criticised by the American historian Eugen Weber in his book France, Fin de Siècle. While agreeing with the insight that there was a significant nexus between occultism and socialism in 19th-century France, his overall assessment was that it was a ″wordy, pretentious, excruciatingly bad book [...] serious students would do better [...] to turn to Auguste Viatte's Sources occultes du Romantisme.″
