= Patrick Besson =

French writer and journalist (born 1956)

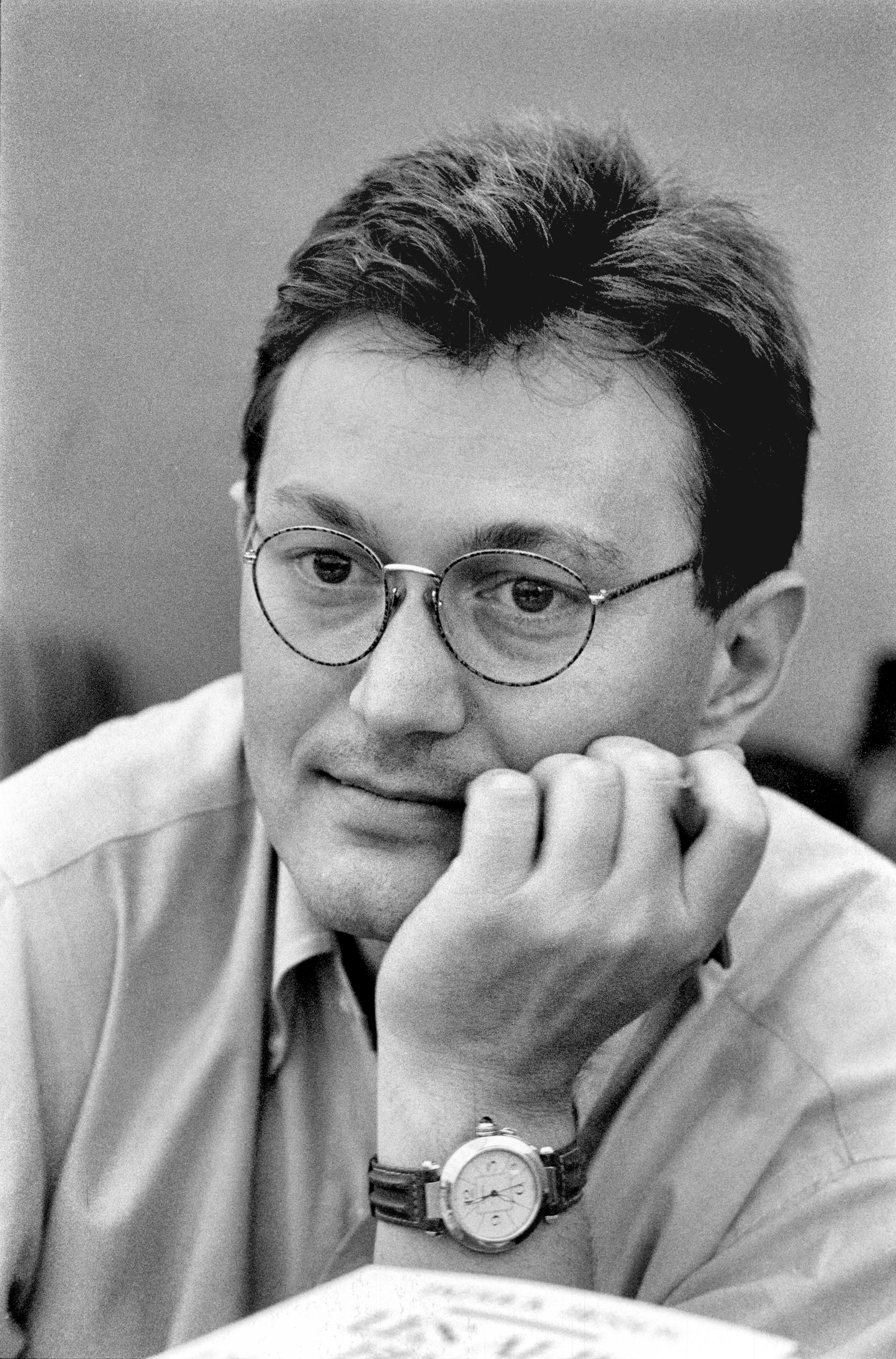
- Born: 1 June 1956 (age 70); Monastir, Tunisia
- Occupation: Writer
- Notable work: Dara

Patrick Besson (born 1 June 1956) is a French writer and journalist.

== Life ==
Besson was born of a half-Russian father and a Croatian mother. He published his first novel, Early Mornings of Love, in 1974, at age 17.

A Communist sympathizer, Besson is a literary chronicler with the newspaper L'Humanité. He also wrote for the newspaper L'Idiot international, whose editor is Jean-Edern Hallier.

Besson supported Serbia during the Yugoslav Wars, which created tension with other intellectuals like Michel Polac, Romain Goupil and Didier Daeninckx. Attacks by Daeninckx led Besson to criticize him in a novel, called Didier Denounces (editions Gerard de Villiers).

Besson wrote a poem, Sonnet Pour Florence Rey, in dedication to the girl who went on a killing spree in Paris in 1994.

In 1987, "L'Humanite" sent Besson to Brazzaville to attend a congress of writers against the South African apartheid.

== Awards ==
Besson received a Grand prix du roman de l'Académie française in 1985 for Dara and the Prix Renaudot in 1995 for Braban.

He was awarded Order of the Serbian Flag.

== Works ==
- Les Petits Maux d'amour, éditeur : Seuil 1974 (ISBN 9782020012270)
- L'école des absents, éditeur : Du Seuil 1976 (ISBN 9782020044752)
- La Maison du jeune homme seul, éditeur : Hachette 1979 (ISBN 9782010057113)
- La boum, avec Danièle Thompson, Éditions Jai Lu 1983 (ISBN 9782277215042 )
- Dara, Éditions du Seuil 1985 (ISBN 2020088878)
- La Chute de Saigon : Théâtre 1986, éditeur : Messidor
- Lettres d'Europe, avec (France) Symposium international sur l'identité culturell 1988 (ISBN 9782226032751)
- La statue du commandeur, éditeur : Albin Michel 1988 (ISBN 9782226034632)
- Ah! Berlin et Autres Récits, éditeur : Gallimard 1989 (ISBN 978-2070381173)
- Un peu d'humanité, éditeur Messedor 1989 (ISBN 9782209061198)
- Divers gauche, éditeur Messedor 1990 (ISBN 9782209064182)
- La Paresseuse, éditeur Albin Michel 1990 (ISBN 2226048324)
- Le congrès de Tours n'aura pas, édition : Messidor 1990 (ISBN 2209063299)
- Les années Isabelle, éditeur : du Rocher; réédition en 2010, éditeur : Millee (ISBN 9782755501353)
- Rot coco, Éditeur : R. Deforges 1991 (ISBN 9782905538871 )
- Les ai-je bien descendus? éditeur : Messidor 1991 (ISBN 9782209066100)
- Je sais des histoires, éditeur : du Rocher 1991 (ISBN 9782268011400 )
- Julius et Isaac, éditeur : Albin Michel 1992 (ISBN 9782226059611)
- Le deuxième couteau, éditeur : Christophe Barrault 1993 (ISBN 9782736000172)
- La femme riche, éditeur : Albin Michel 1993 (ISBN 9782286047559)
- Le viol de Mike Tyson, Editeur : Scandéditions 1993(ISBN 9782209068326)
- L'argent du parti, éditeur : Le Temps des cerises 1993 (ISBN 9782841090013)
- Pas trop près de l'écran, with Éric Neuhoff, éditions du Rocher 1993 (ISBN 2268016250)
- Souvenir d'une galaxie dite nationale-bolchevique éditions du Rocher 1994 (ISBN 9782268017280)
- Les Braban, éditions Albin Michel 1995 (ISBN 978-2226078513)
- Sonnet pour Florence Rey et autres textes, éditeur : L'Âge d'Homme 1996 (ISBN 9782825107249)
- Folks, ou, [o kósmos], éditeur : du Rocher 1996 (ISBN 9782268021621)
- Haldred: Récit, éditeur : Calmann-Lévy 1996 (ISBN 978-2702126363)
- Amicalement rouge, éditeur : Messidor 1996 (ISBN 978-2209059485)
- Didier dénonce, éditeur : G. de Villiers 1997 (ISBN 9782738658913)
- Dedans, dehors: Les nouvelles frontières de l'organisation, éditeur : Vuibert 1998 (ISBN 9782711779857)
- Lettre à un ami perdu, éditeur : Jai lu 1998 (ISBN 9782277302186)
- Belgrade 99, suivi de Contre les calomniateurs de la Serbie, éditeur : L'Âge d'Homme 1999 (ISBN 9782825113264)
- La Titanic, éditeur: Rocher Eds Du 1999 (ISBN 2268032256 )
- Accessible à certaine mélancolie, éditeur : Albin Michel 2000 (ISBN 9782226117342)
- J'aggrave mon cas, éditeur : Rocher 2001 (ISBN 978-2268039350)
- Lui, éditeur : Point 2001 (ISBN 2757816195)
- Le deuxième couteau, éditeur : Lgf 2001 (ISBN 2253150134 )
- L'Orgie échevelée, éditeur : Fayard 2001 (ISBN 9782842059521)
- 28, boulevard Aristide Briand, éditeur : Christian de Bartillat 2001 (ISBN 978-2841002344)
- Un état d'esprit éditeur : Fayard 2002 (ISBN 9782213611877)
- Vous n'auriez pas vu ma chaîne en or ?, éditeur : La Table ronde 2002 (ISBN 9782710325062)
- 28, boulevard Aristide-Briand, suivi de "Vacances en Botnie", éditeur : J'ai lu 2003 (ISBN 9782290334331 )
- Paris vu dans l'eau, éditeur : Presses De La Renaissance 2003 (ISBN 2856169104)
- Les Voyageurs du Trocadéro, éditeur : Rocher Eds 2003 (ISBN 2268044491)
- Le Sexe fiable, éditeur : Mille et une nuits 2004 (ISBN 9782842058180)
- Encore que, éditeur : Mille et une nuits 2004 (ISBN 9782842058708)
- Solderie, éditeur : Fayard 2004 (ISBN 9782842058722)
- La Cause du people, éditeur : Fayard 2004 (ISBN 9782213614496)
- Le dîner de filles, éditeur : Le Serpent à Plumes 2005 (ISBN 978-2268056661)
- Les Frères de la Consolation, éditeur : Grasset & Fasquelle 2005 (ISBN 9782246510529)
- Ma rentrée littéraire, éditeur : Cavatinea 2005 (ISBN 2915850011)
- Saint-Sépulcre !, éditions Points 2005 (ISBN 9782757801727)
- Le corps d'Agnès Le Roux, éditeur : fayard 2006 (ISBN 9782213629124)
- Marilyn Monroe n'est pas morte, éditeur : Mille et une nuits 2006 (ISBN 2842059530)
- Défiscalisées, éditeur : Mille et une nuits 2006 (ISBN 9782842059330)
- Zodiaque amoureux, éditeur : Mille et une nuits 2006 (ISBN 9782842059330 )
- Nostalgie de la princesse, éditeur : Fayard 2006 (ISBN 9782213629490 )
- Belle-sœur, éditeur : Fayard 2007 (ISBN 9782213632421)
- La Science du baiser, éditeur : Points 2007 (ISBN 9782757804865)
- Accessible à certaine mélancolie, éditeur : Points 2007 (ISBN 9782757806418)
- Et la nuit seule entendit leurs paroles , éditeur : Mille et une nuits 2008 (ISBN 9782755500547)
- La Statue du commandeur , éditeur : Points Publication 2008 (ISBN 9782757809990)
- 1974, éditeur : Fayard 2009 (ISBN 9782213643359)
- Mais le fleuve tuera l'homme blanc, éditeur : Fayard 2009 (ISBN 9782213629667)
- La Haine de la Hollande, éditeur : Infini Cercle Bleu 2009 (ISBN 9782354050030)
