= Hyatt Regency Paris Étoile =

Hotel in Paris, France

- Hyatt Regency Paris Étoile
- Interactive map of the Hyatt Regency Paris Étoile area

General information
- Type: Hotel
- Location: Paris 17th arr.
- Coordinates: 48°52′50″N 02°17′04″E
- Completed: 1974
- Owner: Constellation Hotel Holdings (Qatar Holding)
- Management: Hyatt Hotels

Height
- Antenna spire: 190 m (620 ft)
- Roof: 137 m (449 ft)

Technical details
- Floor count: 33

Design and construction
- Architects: Henri Guibout, Serge Maloletenkov, Yves Betin.

Website
- www.hyatt.com/en-US/hotel/france/hyatt-regency-paris-etoile/parhr

The Hyatt Regency Paris Étoile is a skyscraper hotel located near the Porte Maillot in the 17th arrondissement of Paris, France. The 995-room hotel was built in 1974 as the Hôtel Concorde La Fayette, and is the second largest in Paris after the Le Méridien Étoile. The hotel is part of the Palais des Congrès, one of the city's convention centers. It is the fourth-tallest building in the city of Paris (which does not contain the La Défense business district). A spire of 53 metres (174 ft) stands on its roof.

== History ==
The hotel's location was formerly a free space, hosting amusement parks during the summer. After World War II, temporary buildings were quickly built there in order to host some services from French ministries. In 1960, facing the international boom in tourist and congress activities, the Chambre de Commerce et d'Industrie and the Tourism Committee decided to build a convention centre on the site. The selected architects were Henri Guibout, Serge Maloletenkov and Yves Betin. During that study, it was decided to build a large luxury hotel adjacent to the centre. The hotel opened in 1974 as the Hôtel Concorde La Fayette.

It was sold in 2013 by Starwood Capital to Constellation Hotel Holdings (a division of Qatar Holdings) and became the Hyatt Regency Paris Etoile on 23 April 2013.

== Characteristics ==
- 137 metres (449 ft) high, 190 metres (620 ft) with its antenna
- 995 rooms and suites on 34 floors
- Mayo Restaurant
- A Windo Skybar panoramic bar on the 34th floor
- 35 reception rooms totalling 2,800 square metres (30,000 sq ft) of meeting space
- The Hyatt Catering service, which serves practical and gourmet dining in all areas of the Palais des Congrès

== See also ==
- List of tallest buildings and structures in the Paris region
