= Jean-Edern Hallier =

French writer, critic and editor

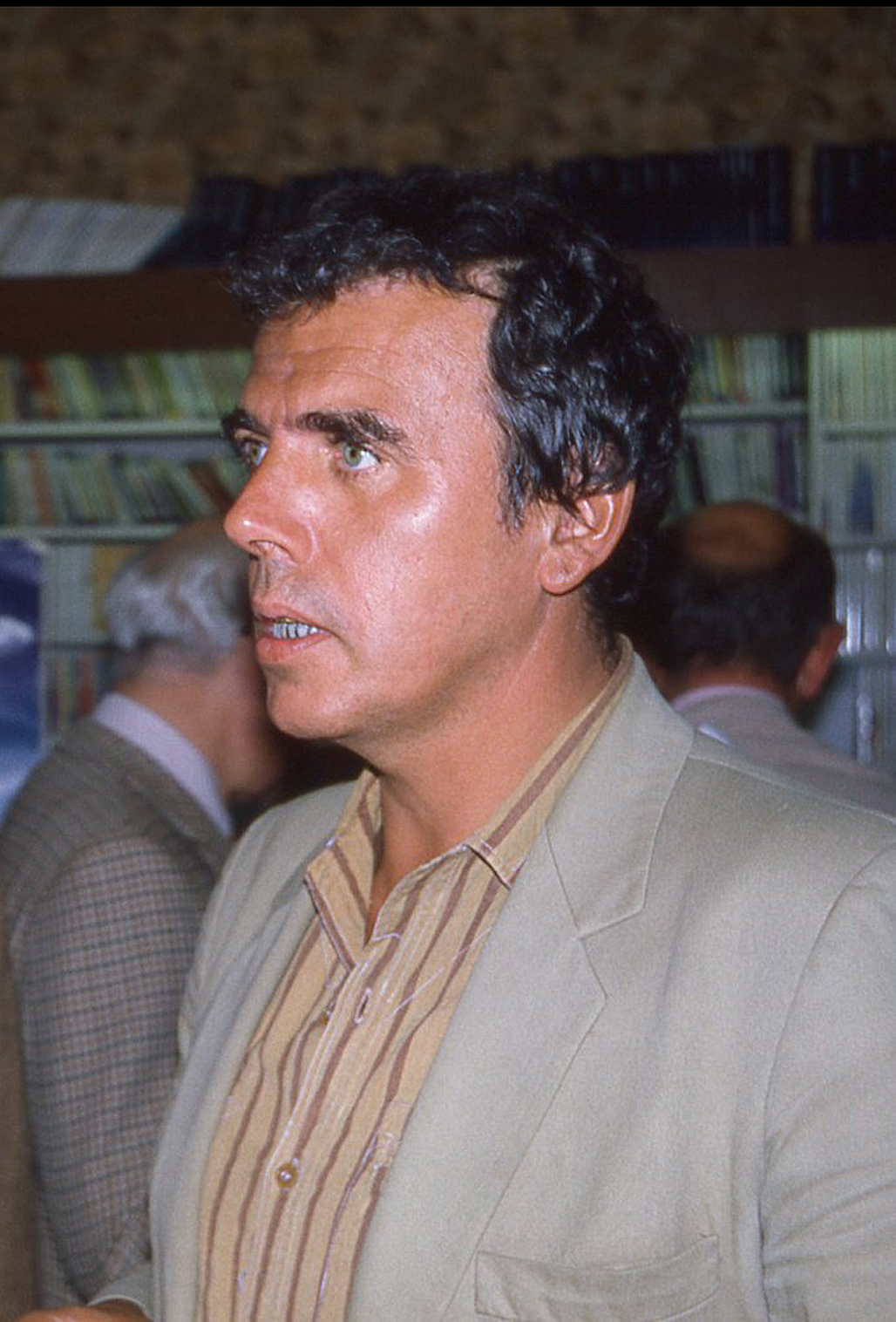
- Jean-Edern Hallier in 1981
- Born: Jean Hallier; 1 March 1936; Saint-Germain-en-Laye, France
- Died: 12 January 1997 (aged 60); Deauville, France
- Occupation: Writer

Jean-Edern Hallier (1 March 1936 – 12 January 1997) was a French writer, critic and publisher.

After his exclusion from the literary review Tel Quel, which he co-founded with Philippe Sollers, Hallier went on to publish novels and satirical pamphlets, and created the controversial newspaper L'Idiot International.

== Overview ==
The son of World War I French General André Hallier, Jean Hallier was born in 1936. While the Hallier family has ancient Breton roots on his father's side, he later claimed in his novel L'évangile du fou (1986) that his mother had Alsatian and Jewish heritage. He was baptised in the village of Edern, whose name he later added to his first name Jean.

Hallier, returning to France after World War II, first studied at the Abbey of Pierre-Qui-Vire and then at a Paris lycée and at the University of Oxford. He travelled extensively, even getting shipwrecked in the Persian Gulf, and in 1960 founded the literary review Tel Quel along with Philippe Sollers and Jean-René Hughenin. Three years later he published his first novel, Les Aventures d'une jeune fille ("The Adventures of a Young Girl"). He then worked as an editor for publishing house Plon and completed a second novel, Le Grand écrivain ("The Great Author"), in 1967.

Deeply stirred by the 1968 student riots in Paris, Hallier disclosed left-wing political views in the partly autobiographical La Cause des peuples (1972). He engaged into politics full-time and started the first, leftist version of his paper, L'Idiot international, partly funded at first by Jean-Paul Sartre and Simone de Beauvoir.

Hallier traveled to Chile after Pinochet's 1973 coup, carrying funds gathered by Régis Debray. Hallier was supposed to hand the money out to the Chilean resistance. However, he returned to Paris without the money and without having delivered it to the resistance, claiming he had bought 400,000 hectares in the Amazon Basin to provide shelter for the future Chilean exiles. He progressively broke up with the left-wing after this event. He also broke with the literary style of the nouveau roman with Chagrins d'amour, which was shortlisted for the Prix Goncourt in 1974.

He hosted one of the first pirate radio stations in 1977, "Radio Verte", close to the ecology movement. Radio Verte only ran for two days, but wielded a lasting influence.

He was suspected of simulating his own kidnapping in 1982, and of organizing a bombing in Régis Debray's building (which caused no casualties), a suspicion recently confirmed by Régis Debray and Gilles Ménage, who worked for President François Mitterrand in the Elysée cell involved in the wiretap scandal (see below). He also committed, it was alleged, less serious "attacks", such as setting fire to Françoise Mallet-Joris's doormat. Mallet-Joris was a member of the Goncourt jury, and the fire was meant as a protest against the way literary prizes were awarded.

Politically, Hallier was successively a Maoist, an admirer of Fidel Castro, while at the same time getting close to Jacques Chirac, and supported Pinochet after his return from his expedition to Chile.

For a time, he was close to François Mitterrand, who successfully ran for President in 1981 for the Socialist Party (PS), but later opposed him, threatening to reveal the existence of his illegitimate daughter Mazarine Pingeot. From the moment he threatened to publish a pamphlet on Mitterrand in 1982, he was closely watched by a special cell in the Elysée Palace in an attempt to block the revelation of Mazarine's existence. Hallier's telephone conversations were continually eavesdropped on by this cell from 1982 onwards. He and any potential publisher were hounded by tax inspectors dispatched to instil the fear of "God" (Mitterrand's nickname) into them. His apartment was also burned down in an arson attack.

In 1991, L'Idiot international was one of the French newspapers which opposed participation to the Gulf War, and Jean-Edern Hallier went to Iraq to cover the events. Earlier, he had published Salman Rushdie's The Satanic Verses (1988), and personally delivered a copy of the book to the Iranian embassy in Paris. He was sued for defamation in articles published in L'Idiot international by Jack Lang as well as other people. He never defended himself during the trials, and never went to Appeal Court; he had to auction off his flat in order to pay damages to Bernard Tapie who had successfully charged him with defamation.

Jean-Edern Hallier died from a cerebral haemorrhage after falling from his bicycle in Deauville in 1997.

== Bibliography ==
Works by Jean-Edern Hallier

- Les Aventures d'une jeune fille, Seuil, 1963:
- Le Grand écrivain, Seuil, 1967;
- La Cause des peuples, Seuil, 1972;
- Chagrin d'amour, Editions Libres-Hallier, 1974;
- Le Premier qui dort réveille l'autre, Le Sagittaire, 1977;
- Chaque matin qui se lève est une leçon de courage, Editions Libres-Hallier, 1978;
- Lettre ouverte au colin froid (a pamphlet against then-president Giscard d'Estaing), Albin Michel, 1978;
- Un barbare en Asie du Sud-Est, Editions Néo, 1980;
- Fin de siècle, Albin Michel, 1980;
- L'Évangile du fou, Albin Michel, 1986.

Works about Jean-Edern Hallier

- Carré d'Art : Jules Barbey d'Aurevilly, Lord Byron, Salvador Dalí, Jean-Edern Hallier, Jean-Pierre Thiollet, with texts by Anne-Élisabeth Blateau and François Roboth, Anagramme Editions, 2008. ISBN 978-2-35035-189-6
- Hallier, l'Edernel jeune homme, Jean-Pierre Thiollet, Neva Editions, 2016. ISBN 978-2-35055-217-0
- Jean-Edern Hallier, l'idiot insaisissable, Jean-Claude Lamy, Albin Michel, 2017. ISBN 978-2-226-31997-5
- Hallier ou l'Edernité en marche, Jean-Pierre Thiollet, Neva Editions, 2018. ISBN 978-2-35055-247-7
- Hallier Edernellement vôtre, Jean-Pierre Thiollet, with texts by Isabelle Coutant-Peyre and François Roboth, Neva Editions, 2019. ISBN 978-2-35055-273-6
- Hallier, L'Homme debout, Jean-Pierre Thiollet, with texts by François Roboth, Neva Editions, 2020.ISBN 978-2-35055-285-9
- Hallier, L'Edernel retour, Jean-Pierre Thiollet, with texts by François Roboth, Neva Editions, 2021.ISBN 978-2-35055-295-8
- Hallier en roue libre, Jean-Pierre Thiollet, with texts by François Roboth, Neva Editions, 2022.ISBN 978-2-35055-305-4
- Hallier tout feu tout flamme, Jean-Pierre Thiollet, with text by François Roboth, Neva Editions, 2023.ISBN 978-2-35055-309-2
- Hallier, chagrins d'amour, Jean-Pierre Thiollet, with text by François Roboth, Neva Editions, 2024.ISBN 978-2-35055-313-9
- Hallier de A à Z. L'esprit à l'oeuvre, volume 1, Jean-Pierre Thiollet, with text by François Roboth, Neva Editions, 2025.ISBN 978-2-35055-322-1
