= H (novel) =

1973 novel by Philippe Sollers

- First edition
- Author: Philippe Sollers
- Original title: H
- Translator: Veronika Stankovianska, David Vichnar
- Language: French
- Genre: Fiction
- Publisher: Equus Press
- Publication date: 1973
- Publication place: France
- English publication date: 2015
- Media type: Print
- Pages: 172 pp.
- ISBN: 978-0-9931955-0-1

H (French: H) is a 1973 novel by French novelist Philippe Sollers. The novel was distinguished by its lack of punctuation, similar to Sollers's novels Lois and Paradis. The book was published in English translation in 2015. Critic Roland Champagne describes H as the "culmination" of the "breakdown in traditional writing for Sollers," a period that began with Sollers's novel Lois.

== Overview ==
Sollers opens H with a reference to Deleuze and Guattari's Anti-Oedipus. This reference, Roland Champagne argues, reflects a kinship between the Anti-Oedipus authors' view of the self as a "desiring machine" and Sollers's desire to parody the "texts which create the self and thereby produce mirror-images of the self as it is reflected in the languages of culture."

H is characterized by Sollers's preoccupation with Joyce's Finnegans Wake, a book that provides Sollers an example of "a true subversion of language and a profound historical vision." H also reveals Sollers's interest in Ezra Pound's work, "the epic thrust through time and across space."

Sollers had written in Tel Quel that he needed a "rhythm that reflects the tangle of social relationships." Roland Champagne, in his book on Sollers, writes "for this, he need[ed] a new form that will allow the spoken word to provide such a complex voicing, without the hindrances of formal written structure with its paragraphs, capitalization, and punctuation.

David Hayman wrote that H was a departure for Sollers in that "[i]t is the first of Sollers's books to have frequent glimmers of humor ... and the first to come to its public, as did the Wake, without an explicit ‘key,’ a preliminary road map. The reader must chart his own H space and time, carve out chunks of H meaning, and supply punctuation and emphases.”

Hayman goes on to distinguish H from its antecedents such as Finnegans Wake: "While the Wake has strong, if hidden, elements of plot and character, and a coherent and systematic development, there is no plot line in H or Paradis. If there are personalities, there are no personae. Instead we have the overarching person (sujet) of the writer imposing itself discreetly through its rhythms upon a vision of history as process, or rather of historical flux.”

== Reception ==
French literary critic Roland Barthes grouped H with three other books by Sollers, Drame, Paradis, and Lois, and described these four as books that

have to be referred to as novels because there is no other term to designate them. But they do not tell stories, describe a particular society or present identifiable characters. They are texts of which language itself is the subject, language which is wholly free from the duty to describe. The world which these texts presents is not one which the reader could either identify as her own or see clearly as different from it. In the past, in Barthes's view it was the author's duty to describe such a world which held language unjustifiably captive. One of the reasons he writes with such enthusiasm about Sollers is the way in which texts such as Paradis and Lois show what happens when this duty is removed.

Philip Barnard and Cheryl Lester also viewed H as a turning point in Sollers's work, while also acknowledging its clear antecedents in the work of authors like Joyce and Faulkner:

Without yet returning to plot and character, the novels H (1973) and Paradis (1981) transform the discrete segments and pronounced architecture of the earlier works into a continuous, unpunctuated flow of rhythmic prose. With these two novels, Sollers achieved a tour de force of modernist poetics whose clear precedents are Joyce and Faulkner. The powerful narrative voice that emerges in these works foregrounds song, chant, psalmody, and real rhythms that point toward their sources in sacred texts and Dantean epos.

Driftless Area Review lauded H, stating "[a]long with Ulysses and Beckett’s Three Novels, H can take its place in the permanent avant-garde."

== Sources ==
- Barnard, Philip; Lester, Cheryl (1988). "Philippe Sollers: Femmes". Yale French Studies (After the Age of Suspicion: The French Novel Today (Special Issue)): 163–166. doi:10.2307/2929366. ISBN 0-300-04386-4. JSTOR 2929366.
- Barthes, Roland (1987). Writer Sollers. Minneapolis: University of Minnesota Press. ISBN 0-8166-1627-2.
- Champagne, Roland (1996). Philippe Sollers. Atlanta: Rodopi. ISBN 978-9042000049.
- "Translation Tuesdays: H, by Philippe Sollers". Driftless Area Review. 17 November 2015.
- Hayman, David (1974). "An Interview with Philippe Sollers". Iowa Review. 5.4 (Winter) (4): 91–101. doi:10.17077/0021-065X.1773.
- Hayman, David (1978). "An Interview with Philippe Sollers". In Hayman, David; Anderson, Elliott (eds.). In the Wake of the Wake. Madison: University of Wisconsin Press. ISBN 0-299-07600-8.
- Pollard, Malcolm Charles (1994). The Novels of Philippe Sollers: Narrative and the Visual. Atlanta: Brill Rodopi. ISBN 978-90-5183-707-0.
- Sollers, Philippe (2015). H. London: Equus Press. ISBN 978-0993195501.
