= Alessandro Mercuri =

Italian author and director (born 1973)

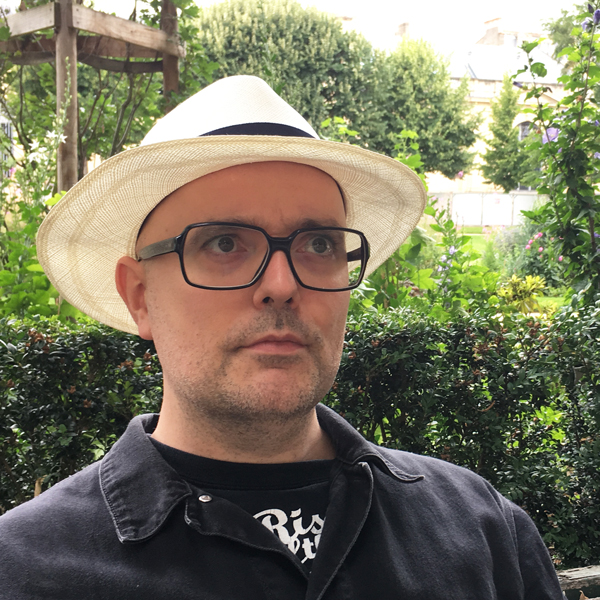
Alessandro Mercuri

Alessandro Mercuri is an Italian author and director, born in 1973.

After studying philosophy in France, he graduated from CalArts, with a MFA in Live Action.

In 2001 he made Alien American, a documentary film about a woman who claimed to be coming from another planet. Selected at the Rotterdam International Film Festival and screened at the Gallery 825 of the Los Angeles Art Association, the film is “neither a fake documentary nor a real fiction that refuses the hierarchy of fact over fiction and, more usefully, shows that this phantasmagoria constitutes American ideology » according to the American critic Holly Willis.

His first essay, Kafka Cola, without pity or added sugar, was published in France in 2008. Described by the critics as an “unidentified literary object”, as “a mega-modern fiction” or as a “treaty of fictional sociology”, the book was praised by Philippe Sollers on its release.

In 2011, with Haijun Park, he founded ParisLike, an online bi-lingual creative arts magazine, devoted to the artistic, literary and scientific avant-gardes. ParisLike features video-documentaries, interviews and critical essays, both in French and in English. Among others: documentaries, interviews and recordings of performances with Bruno Latour, Luc Moullet, Philippe Sollers, Bertrand Hell, Yehezkel Ben-Ari, Luc Ferrari, Michel Maurer, eRikm, Pascal Perrineau, Serge Lehman, Jean Levi, Camille Paglia, Anita Molinero.

== Bibliography ==
=== Publications in French ===
- Kafka Cola, sans pitié ni sucre ajouté, éditions Léo Scheer, 2008 (ISBN 978-2-7561-0156-9)
- Mondo Kawaii in Écrivains en série (saison 2), éditions Léo Scheer, 2010 (ISBN 978-2-7561-0269-6)
- Onfray, Sade et Sarkozy - Le bon, l’obscène et le vulgaire in L'Infini n° 109, éditions Gallimard, 2010 (ISBN 978-2-07-012797-9)
- Kiss Me Deadly in Rouge déclic n°1, éditions La Page noire, 2010 (ISSN 2104-0966)
- Peeping Tom, éditions Léo Scheer, 2011 (ISBN 978-2-7561-0306-8)
- Monsieur Ces Maintenants in L'Infini n°122, éditions Gallimard, 2013 (ISBN 978-2070140381)
- Le dossier Alvin, éditions art&fiction, collection Re:Pacific, 2014 (ISBN 978-2-940377-78-7)
- Holyhood, éditions art&fiction, collection ShushLarry, 2019 (ISBN 978-2-940570-55-3)

=== Publications in English ===
- The adventures of Jesús Maria Veronica in Holyhood in ParisLike, 2011 (ISSN 2117-4725)
- Mad(e) in France - Land of Madness by Luc Moullet in ParisLike, 2011 (ISSN 2117-4725)
- Toxic Dream, about the works of sculptor Anita Molinero in ParisLike, 2012 (ISSN 2117-4725)
- Kino-Porno-Pravda, a pornographer behind the camera, about Raphaël Siboni documentary Il n’y a pas de rapport sexuel in ParisLike, 2012 (ISSN 2117-4725)
- Night of the Living Dead in ParisLike, 2012 (ISSN 2117-4725)
- Aix-voto in ParisLike, 2013 (ISSN 2117-4725)
- The Assassination of Apollinaire in ParisLike, 2013 (ISSN 2117-4725)
- Dallas, city of Hate in ParisLike, 2013 (ISSN 2117-4725)
- Mandrake is Mandrake in ParisLike, 2013 (ISSN 2117-4725)
