= Amérique =

Amérique is the French translation of America.

It may also refer to:

- Amériques, a composition for orchestra by Edgard Varèse
- L'Amérique, a version of Yellow River (song) by Joe Dassin
- L'Amérique, a 1979 novel by Jean Thibaudeau
- L'Amérique, several translations and adaptations of Amerika (novel) by Franz Kafka
- L'Amérique, a sculpture by Gilles Guérin
- L'Amérique, a song by France Gall

== See also ==
- Americas § French
- America (disambiguation)
