= Catherine Cusset =

French novelist (born 1963)

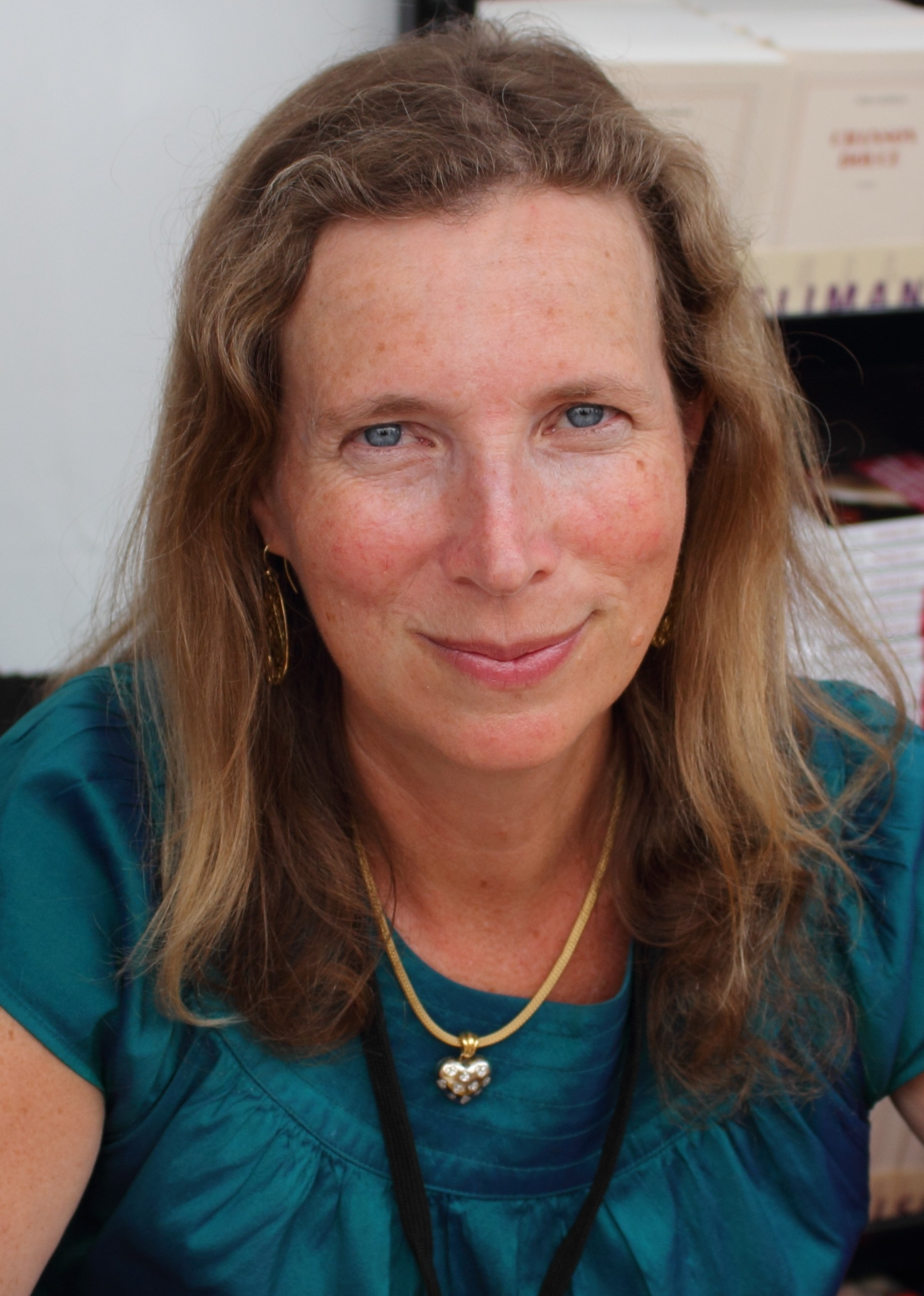
- Born: May 16, 1963 (age 63); Paris
- Occupation: Novelist
- Writing career
- Language: French
- Genre: Literary fiction
- Notable works: Life of David Hockney: A Novel, The Story of Jane, La haine de la famille, Un brillant avenir, L'autre qu'on adorait
- Website: catherinecusset.co.uk

Catherine Cusset (born in Paris, May 16, 1963) is a French novelist and the author of Life of David Hockney: A Novel (Other Press, 2019), The Story of Jane (Simon & Schuster, 2001), and 12 other novels published by Éditions Gallimard between 1990 and 2018. Some of her novels (Jouir, La Haine de la famille, Confessions d'un radine, and New York, Journal d’un cycle) are described as autofiction, a French literary movement that is a hybrid of fiction and autobiography. Others are more romantic, but all share some recurring themes: the family, desire, and cultural conflicts between France and America. She stands out from her contemporaries with a direct, incisive, visual form of writing, marked by the influence of Anglo-Saxon novelists.

External audio
- A Fictional Biography in Life of David Hockney, Interview With Catherine Cusset, Weekend Edition, NPR

Cusset's work has been translated into 22 languages (Belarusian, Bulgarian, Czech, English, German, Greek, Hebrew, Italian, Japanese, Mandarin, Norwegian, Persian, Portuguese, Romanian, Russian, Serbo-Croatian, Slovenian, Spanish, Taiwanese, Turkish, Ukrainian, and Vietnamese).

== Early life and education ==
Cusset is the daughter of a Breton Catholic father and a Parisian Jewish mother. She is the sister of historian and philosopher François Cusset, playwright and philosopher Yves Cusset, and medical doctor Sophie Cusset. She spent her youth in Paris, where she attended Lycée La Fontaine, then Lycée Louis-le-Grand. A former student of the École normale supérieure, she completed her Agrégation to become a professor of classics.

Cusset holds two PhD's: one from Paris Diderot University (Paris VII), where she wrote a dissertation on Marquis de Sade (La raison et la fiction dans L'Histoire de Juliette), and one from Yale University, where she wrote a dissertation on the 18th-century libertine novel (No Tomorrow: The Ethics of Pleasure in the French Enlightenment). She taught 18th-century French literature at Yale University from 1991 to 2002, before turning to writing novels full-time.

Based in the United States for the past 30 years (with interludes in Prague, 1997–1999, and London, 2011–2013), she now lives in Manhattan with her American husband and daughter and spends her summers in Brittany, France.

== Literary career ==
Catherine Cusset entered the French literary scene with La Blouse Roumaine, published in 1990 by Philippe Sollers in his collection L'Infini at Éditions Gallimard. The novel explores the adulterous affair of a French woman married to an American. She thinks she can control her adventure but finds herself caught up in her own game, abandoned at the same time by both her lover and her husband.

Her second novel, En toute innocence, published in 1995, was a finalist for the Prix Femina and a great critical success. It recounts, in the first person, the anxieties of a young girl who wants to lose her virginity and who, three times, encounters death in her path. The short book is written in a single breath, with a jerky rhythm.

À vous, published in 1996, is a novel inspired by the character of Philippe Sollers and his philosophy of pleasure. The narrator, Marie (a recurring name in Cusset's novels), addresses herself from the United States to her Parisian spiritual mentor whose silence obsesses her, whose contempt she imagines, while seeking the means to finish off with him.

Jouir, published in 1997, was Cusset's first autofiction novel. Through a mosaic of scenes related to sexuality, Jouir sketches the portrait, in raw and incisive language, of a woman caught between the strength of her desire and her fear of betraying. The book was badly received by critics when it came out, who either ignored it or attacked it violently.

With Le problème avec Jane, published in 1999, Cusset wrote a more traditional whodunit. Jane is a young professor at a prestigious and fictitious American university that one can recognize as Yale University. One day, Jane finds at her door a manuscript entitled The Problem with Jane. As she starts to read it, she discovers that the anonymous author of the manuscript is intimately and disturbingly familiar with her professional setbacks and her marital problems. It is the story of her own life. But who is the author? An old boyfriend? A rejected lover? The husband she divorced? A jealous colleague, or one secretly in love? A friend? Praised by readers, a finalist of the Prix Medicis and the recipient of the Grand Prix des lectrices de Elle in 2000, Le problème avec Jane sold more than 200,000 copies in French. Le problème avec Jane was translated into English and published by Simon & Schuster as The Problem with Jane.

La Haine de la famille, published in 2001, was acclaimed by critics and by Bernard Pivot, who presented it at the Bouillon de culture TV show on January 19, 2001, as a success story. Exploring mother-daughter relationships over the course of three generations, Cusset's tragicomic family saga spares the reader no detail - the wedding night of the parents, the mother's issues related to digestion, or the grandmother's agony at the hospital. The novel questions the gaze of the narrator, Marie, who is the judge of her mother.

Confessions d'une radine, published in 2003, continued Cusset's work of autofiction and self-criticism with a sequence of funny and spicy stories that probe self-hatred related to money - a topic that may be even more taboo than sex. The novel probes the instinct that drives one to save money and to be wary of the other, and which prevents one from enjoying life, rather than "spend without counting."

Amours transversales, published in 2004, returns to the romantic vein of Le problème avec Jane. A narrative built upon four short stories with recurring characters, Amours transversales is about those loves that are not the ones upon which one has based one's life, but which are no less important: temporary, incidental loves that draw across our lives a transversal line.

Following a silence of four years, Un brillant avenir was published in 2008 and became one of Cusset's greatest successes to date. Selected for the second round of the Prix Medicis and the penultimate round of the Prix Goncourt, the novel won the Prix Goncourt des Lycéens, which propelled it to the best-seller lists for six months. A mix of autobiographical inspiration and novelistic writing, Un brillant avenir traces the life of a woman born in 1936 in Romania from where she eventually fled with her Jewish husband to emigrate to the United States. Hoping to offer her son a "bright future," she saw instead this future being compromised by the arrival into his life of another woman, a French daughter-in-law.

New York, Journal d’un cycle, published in 2009, is a story with photos that appeared in the collection "Traits et portraits" directed by Colette Fellous at Mercure de France. This story dates back to a dozen years earlier and, by its writing, is closer to Jouir and Confessions of a radine. It describes a couple's quarrels around the desire for a child, set in a New York landscape made up of violence, intensity of movement, and unexpected apparitions. The cycle is both the narrator's menstrual cycle and the bike on which she spends her days in New York, moving fast and seeking inner peace.

Une éducation catholique, published in 2014, tells the childhood story of the narrator, Marie, brought up by a practicing Catholic father and an atheist mother of Jewish origin. Starting with the narrator's religious education, the narrative broadens into a reflection on faith, emerging sexuality, and the need to create gods.

L’autre qu’on adorait, published in 2016, was one of four finalists for the Prix Goncourt. It received four prizes: Le Choix Goncourt de la Belgique, Le Choix Goncourt de la Roumanie, Le Choix Goncourt de la Slovenie, and Le Choix Goncourt de la Suisse.

Vie de David Hockney: roman, published in 2018, imagines the life of English painter David Hockney. Cusset wrote the novel before actually meeting Hockney and drew inspiration from published biographies and interviews of the artist. The book was awarded the Prix Anaïs-Nin, translated into English, and published by Other Press in 2019 as Life of David Hockney: A Novel.

== Awards and recognition ==
1995: Prix Femina finalist for En toute innocence.

2000: Grand Prix des lectrices de Elle for Le problème avec Jane

2007: Chevalier de l’Ordre des Arts et des Lettres

2008: Prix Goncourt des Lycéens for Un brillant avenir

2013: Prix littéraire d'Arcachon for Indigo

2016: Prix Goncourt finalist for L'autre qu'on adorait

2016: Le Choix Goncourt de la Belgique for L'autre qu'on adorait

2016: Le Choix Goncourt de la Roumanie for L'autre qu'on adorait

2016: Le Choix Goncourt de la Slovenie for L'autre qu'on adorait

2016: Le Choix Goncourt de la Suisse for L'autre qu'on adorait

2016: Officier de l’Ordre des Arts et des Lettres

2018: Prix Anaïs Nin for Vie de David Hockney

== Bibliography ==
=== Novels in French ===
- La blouse roumaine, Paris, Gallimard, 1990. Folio edition 2015.
- En toute innocence, Paris, Gallimard, 1995. Folio edition 2001.
- À vous, Paris, Gallimard, 1996. Folio edition 2003.
- Jouir, Paris, Gallimard, 1997. Folio edition 1999.
- Le problème avec Jane, Paris, Gallimard, 1999. Folio edition 2018. Grand prix des lectrices de Elle, 2000.
- La haine de la famille, Paris, Gallimard, 2001. Folio edition 2002.
- Confessions d'une radine, Paris, Gallimard, 2003. Folio edition 2004.
- Amours transversales, Paris, Gallimard, 2004. Folio edition 2005.
- Un brillant avenir, Paris, Gallimard, 2008. Folio edition 2010. Prix Goncourt des Lycéens, 2008.
- New York, Journal d’un cycle, Paris, Mercure de France, 2009. Folio edition 2011.
- Indigo, Paris, Gallimard, 2013. Folio edition 2014.
- Une éducation catholique, Paris, Gallimard, 2014. Folio edition 2016.
- Le côté gauche de la plage, Brest, Dialogues, 2015.
- L’autre qu’on adorait, Paris, Gallimard, 2016. Folio edition 2018. Prix Goncourt finalist, 2016.
- Vie de David Hockney: roman, Paris, Gallimard, 2018. Prix Anaïs Nin, 2018.
- La définition du bonheur, Paris,

=== Novels Available in English ===
- The Story of Jane, New York, Simon and Schuster, 2001.
- Life of David Hockney: A Novel, New York, Other Press, 2019.

=== Nonfiction ===
- No Tomorrow: The Ethics of Pleasure in the French Enlightenment, University of Virginia Press, 1999.
