= ParisLike =

ParisLike is a bi-lingual e-journal devoted to the new artistic, literary, intellectual and scientific practices. Founded in 2011 by Alessandro Mercuri and Haijun Park, the review features video documentaries, performances, interviews, critical essays and illustrated texts subtitled and translated into English.

Among others figures who can be found in the magazine: Pierre Guyotat, Luc Moullet, Bruno Latour, Philippe Sollers, Bertrand Hell, Yehezkel Ben-Ari, Peter Szendy, Pascal Perrineau, eRikm, Luc Ferrari, Michel Maurer, Anita Molinero, Ryan Trecartin and Lizzie Fitch, Serge Lehman, Jean Levi, Camille Paglia, Cécile Mainardi, Erik Morse...

Productions of the magazine are part of the digital archives of the fr:FRAC Languedoc-Roussillon, fr:CEVIPOF, Documents d'artistes, INSERM. Some were screened at the Centre Pompidou, University of Tokyo and at New York University and one essay was published by the Éditions Gallimard.

== Videos ==
- Joyeux animaux de la misère with Pierre Guyotat (2015, 27min.)
- Stardust Philosophy with Peter Szendy (2013, 40 min.)
- Paris Mirage with Xavier Boissel (2013, 39 min.)
- The Angel of the Odd with Côme Fabre (2013, 32 min.)
- Mandrake is Mandrake with Mandrake the Magician and Leon Mandrake (2013, 31 min.)
- Sade's Way with Philippe Sollers (2013, 31 min.)
- Possession & Shamanism with Bertrand Hell (2013, 62 min.)
- Radium Unlimited with Serge Lehman (2013, 25 min.)
- The Dream of de La Panouse with Paul de La Panouse (2013, 20 min.)
- France in the Boudoir with Pascal Perrineau (2012, 24 min.)
- Any Ever, about Ryan Trecartin and Lizzie Fitch exhibition at the Musée d’Art Moderne de la Ville de Paris (2012, 12 min.)
- Spiral Dregs with eRikm (2012, 34 min.)
- 36 Enfilades by Luc Ferrari with Michel Maurer (2012, 37 min.)
- Inaugural Address of the French President with Gaspard Delanoë (2012, 10 min.)
- The Cinema according to Luc with Luc Moullet (2011, 33 min.)
- Toxic Dream with Anita Molinero (2011, 20 min.)
- Ufo Follies with Bruno Latour (2011, 19 min.)
- Venus Heel with Raphael Young (2011, 13 min.)
- The Electrical Hippocampus with Yehezkel Ben-Ari (2011, 26 min.)

== Interviews ==
- The myth of the hands of clay, with Jean Levi
- Rebel With a Cause, with Camille Paglia
