= Jean Thibaudeau =

French writer and translator

- Born: 17 March 1935; La Roche-sur-Yon (Vendée
- Died: 18 December 2013 (aged 78); Paris
- Occupations: Writer; Translator

Jean Thibaudeau (7 March 1935 – 18 December 2013) was a French writer and translator.

A novelist, essayist, playwright and translator, he was a member of the editorial board of the literary magazine Tel Quel.

He translated into French works by Julio Cortázar, Edoardo Sanguineti, Italo Calvino. He was also the author of an innovative radio work that has been translated and adapted in many countries.

== Works ==
- 1960: Une cérémonie royale, Paris, Éditions de Minuit, Prix Fénéon (1961)
- 1966: Ouverture, Paris, Éditions du Seuil
- 1967: Ponge, Paris, Éditions Gallimard, serie "La bibliothèque idéale"
- 1968: Imaginez la nuit, novel, éd. du Seuil, series "Tel Quel"
- 1970: Mai 1968 en France, preceded by Printemps rouge by Philippe Sollers, éd. du Seuil, series "Tel Quel"
- 1972: Socialisme, avant-garde, littérature : interventions, Paris, Les Éditions sociales
- 1974: Ouverture... Roman noir ou Voilà les morts, à notre tour d'en sortir, éd. du Seuil
- 1978: L'Amour de la littérature, Paris, Flammarion
- 1979: L'Amérique, Flammarion, series Digraphe, ISBN 2-08-062513-6
- 1984: Journal des pirogues, Paris, L'Un dans l'autre, series "Palimpsestes", ISBN 2-904545-01-8
- 1987: Mémoires : album de familles, Seyssel, éd. Comp'Act, series Liber"
- 1991:Souvenirs de guerre : poésies et journal, followed by Dialogues de l'aube, Paris, Hatier, series "Haute enfance"ISBN 2-218-03750-5
- 1994: Comme un rêve : roman et autre histoires, Paris, éd. Écriture, ISBN 2-909240-09-6
- 1994: Mes années "« Tel quel » : mémoire, Éd. Écriture, ISBN 2-909240-10-X
- 1999: Lettres à Jean Thibaudeau, Francis Ponge. Présentation et notes du destinataire, Cognac, Éditions Le Temps qu'il fait
- 2004: Préhistoires, Monaco / Paris, Éditions du Rocher, series "Esprits libres", ISBN 2-268-04931-0
- 2011: Ouverture [romans], Grenoble, de l'incidence éditeur, ISBN 978-2-918193-06-7

== Theatre ==
- Le concert de vocables, directed by Christian Rist and Jean Thibaudeau, text by Francis Ponge. With Nelly Borgeaud, Catherine Ferran, Denise Gence (et al.). Performed in Avignon, 21 July 1985.

== Radio interviews ==
- 1975: [Five] interviews with Alain Robbe-Grillet, France Culture. 1 recordable CD (1 h 07 min 55 s), Institut national de l'audiovisuel, series "Entretiens avec...", 1986
- 1976: [Four] interviews with Italo Calvino, France Culture, 2 recordable CDs (54 min 27 s et 51 min 19 s), Institut national de l'audiovisuel, series "Entretiens avec...", 1986

== Radio Fictions ==
- 1961: Reportage international d'un match de football réalisé par Alain Trutat, France Culture. 1 CD (74 min), éditions Phonurgia nova / Ina, series "Les Grandes heures de la radio..", 1998. ISBN 2-908325-09-8
- 1998: Mai 68 en France, 1 book and 1 compact disc of sound archives of the May events by Europe1, éditions Phonurgia nova, series "Les Grandes heures de la radio.."
