= Le Parti pris des choses =

Le Parti pris des choses is a collection of 32 short to medium-length prose poems by the French poet and essayist Francis Ponge. It was first published in 1942. The title has been translated into English as Taking the Side of Things and as The Nature of Things. (Note: Perhaps to echo Lucretius although the book's philosophical underpinnings are more often associated with phenomenology.)

== Background ==
=== Life and career ===
Francis Ponge was born in 1899 in Montpellier, France. He started writing at a relatively young age, gaining notice even in the early 1920s. Like many French writers of his time, he was also politically associated, joining the ranks of the Socialist Party in 1919. As a writer, he joined the Surrealist movement for a short time during the 1930s; this also had political ramifications, influencing him to join the Communist Party. However, his most notable works were to come later in his life.

He fought in both World Wars, and it was after his stint in the army in World War II that he decided to leave the Communist Party. It was at this time, in 1942, that he joined the French Resistance and also published what is considered his most famous work, Le parti pris des choses. This text was in fact written over the span of 15 years, from 1924 to 1939.

After his publication of Le parti pris des choses, Ponge was not unnoticed in the literary world. He was praised heavily by literary heavyweights Albert Camus and Jean-Paul Sartre in the early 1960s. Furthermore, the French literary magazine Tel Quel also touted his work during this time period. While he has only recently gained more popularity in the United States, he also spent the later part of his years lecturing across the country and also was a visiting professor at Barnard College and Columbia University.

Francis Ponge won several awards late in his career. This included the Neustadt International Prize for Literature in 1974.

=== Motivation ===
Ponge's works often describe mundane objects – for example "The Pebble" or "The Oyster" – extensively, but in such a way that his works are categorized as prose poetry. Robert W. Greene, a literary critic, noted about the intentions of his works, "He seeks a balance of equivalences, an equation between the order of things and the order of words".

Ponge was also influenced by the ideas of his time. He has his own ideas about the absurd, influenced by Albert Camus in a number of ways. Ponge himself wrote in the Tome Premier that he believed in the unreliability of language and criticized Camus’ views of the search for a single principle as opposed to a number of principles. Many of his writings can be seen as a way to both return to the concrete values of language while also revealing its absurdity.

=== Contemporaries ===
Ponge was well respected by his contemporaries in France and they often helped drive his literary career. An example of this was Tel Quel's praise for Ponge's works throughout the 1960s. Camus and Sartre both respected his work immensely. The philosophical movements of the time in which both Camus and Sartre were leaders in turn influenced Ponge's own work. For instance, Ponge used Camus’ ideas about absurdity to form his own views. It was in fact partly due to Sartre's praise of Ponge that he was able to win the prestigious Neudstadt Prize.

== Style ==
Ponge stated that his overarching goal was to create a "single cosmogony" through his works, an aim readily apparent in poems like "Le Galet" which is a miniature cosmogony all by itself. Each of the works in the collection explores some object in the corporeal world, "borrowing the brevity and infallibility of the dictionary definition and the sensory aspect of the literary description". Lee Fahnestock, one of Le parti pris des choses’ translators, describes the work as "construct[ing] a new form of definition-description". The style shown in Le parti pris des choses was Ponge's first foray into what would become his definitive trademark.

=== The Objeu ===
Much of Ponge's poetic style reflects his idea of the "objeu" (a portmanteau word combining objet (object/thing) and jeu (game)), or the "objective play of the mind". The objeu is the act of pointedly choosing language or subject matter for its double meanings, hidden connections, and sensory effects on the reader. Indeed, his attitude toward the depiction of objects is neatly summed up by the saying "Parti Pris des Choses = Compte Tenu des Mots," which translates loosely to "taking the side of things = taking into account the words." Indeed, where pure description is inadequate to truly capture the spirit of an object, Ponge employs auditory effects (e.g. assonance, sibilance, and paronomasia) as well as images that delight all the senses. He anthropomorphized his animal and arboreal subjects to make them more relatable. According to Fahnestock, the objeu allowed him to "say several things on several levels at once, while unobtrusively demonstrating the particular nature of words and things".

However, though Ponge attempted to evoke the feeling of the object he was describing by any possible means, he simultaneously believed that good poems were "the most structured, the most uninvolved, the ‘coldest’ possible". To him, the employment of the objeu was rote enough that the evocation of emotion could still be "cold" and "uninvolved." It comes as no surprise that Ponge admired the art of such artists as Cézanne, Braque, and Picasso – Post-Impressionists and Cubists whose mission was to capture the feeling and significance in addition to the form of their subjects – for Ponge shared their goal.

Though the objeu was prominent, creative interpretation and plays on words never took the reins: description was always the primary goal. When discussing "Le Galet," Ponge stated that "most important for the ‘health’ of the contemplator is the naming, in the course of his investigations, of all the qualities which he discovers: these qualities, which ‘transport’ him, must not transport him beyond the limits of reasonable and accurate expression". To step out of this realm would be to submit to subjectivity and self-indulgence, qualities which Ponge looked down upon above all.

=== Ponge and the Poetry World ===
While Ponge's work is most often classified as prose poetry, he publicly rejected the moniker of "poet", stating that he "uses poetic magma… only to get rid of it". While much commentary is focused on this, it appears from his writing style that Ponge's issue was more with the self-indulgent lyricism of some poets than with the concept of poetry itself. Ponge appears to have a very conflicted relationship with poetry. Though he made such statements as "ideas are not my forte," his works abound with ideas: he stated early in his career that "it is less the object that must be painted than an idea of that object," a statement which can be accepted alongside even his later works. Though he looks with disdain upon personal involvement, his own concept of the objeu points to great personal investment in his work.

The style of description and calculated subconscious evocation that Ponge established in his early writings starting with Le parti pris des choses was emulated by later French poets, notably Yves Bonnefoy, Jacques Dupin, and André Du Bouchet, the first two of whom employ the "old master's" techniques of subtle wordplay. Du Bouchet, by contrast, has taken Ponge's style of conveying sense impressions and made it his own. These poets are by no means Ponge devotees, but each has drawn something from their predecessor.

== Poems ==
Of the poems of Ponge's self-proclaimed "poetic encyclopedia", "Snails", "The Pebble", and "The Mollusk" are often subject to scrutiny. Each displays a characteristic Pongian theme or themes.

=== The Pebble ===
"The Pebble", or "Le Galet", is easily the longest poem in the collection, being exceptionally long for the genre of prose poetry on the whole. To describe a pebble, Ponge starts at the beginning, literally, the beginning of time itself, diverging from his usual trend of descriptions and assertions. Instead, the reader gets a condensed cosmogony, describing the formation of the first rock, (the Earth, or however the reader wants to interpret it) as a sort of allegory of The Fall. Venturing through the "expulsion of life", "cooling", large tectonic plates, all the way down to the pebble itself, or the "kind of stone that I [Ponge] can pick it up and turn it over in my hand", the pebble comes to stand for rock as a species or entity. The metaphor not to be missed in this poem is the stone as Time, where the "great wheel of stone" rolls ever on as "plant life, animals, gases and liquids revolve quite rapidly in their cycles of dying". This then can be taken as Ponge's view of humanity, as he himself in an essay on "The Pebble" compares looking within himself to telling the story of the pebble. For Ponge, it is best to "consider all things as unknown, and to ... begin again right from the beginning".

== Translations ==
Le Parti pris des choses has been translated into English several times. Translators of the collection or of parts of it include Lee Fahnestock, Robert Bly and Beth Archer Brombert.

=== Lee Fahnestock ===
Fahnestock's translation of Le Parti pris des choses is entitled The Nature of Things. While she admits that a more exact translation of "le parti pris des choses" would be something more like "taking the side of things" or "the side taken by things" (implying that the things in the poems speak for themselves without humans), Fahnestock argues that humanity "is never absent from the page." She believes that Ponge gives his subjects human qualities, and she incorporates this idea into her translations. She also argues that when translating Ponge's work, it is sometimes best to incorporate things like rhythm, sound, and puns rather than purely literal translations of the original. Thus, she says that her goal in her translation was to maintain these effects in the English rather than always keeping the exact meaning of the words themselves. She admits that any text by Ponge is challenging to translate because of his use of colloquialisms and puns, and that while something is inevitably lost in translation, enough can be retained to demonstrate the beauty of his ideas across the language barrier.

=== Robert Bly ===
Robert Bly has translated several poems by Francis Ponge and Bly's own work has been heavily influenced and inspired by Ponge's "object" poems, in which he finds a kind of observation of the world that is neither objective nor subjective. For Bly, Ponge is the master of close observation of objects in poetry. He says, "Ponge doesn’t try to be cool, distant, or objective, nor ‘let the object speak for itself.’ His poems are funny, his vocabulary immense, his personality full of quirks, and yet the poem remains somewhere in the place where the senses join the objects." His work on Ponge is embodied in his book Ten Poems of Francis Ponge Translated by Robert Bly and Ten Poems of Robert Bly Inspired by the Poems of Francis Ponge.

=== Beth Archer Brombert ===
Translator and author Beth Archer Brombert published a volume of Ponge poems, The Voice of Things (1972), in which her translation of Le parti pris des choses is titled Taking the Side of Things. She appreciates Ponge's "description-definition-literary art work" that avoids both the dullness of a dictionary and the inadequacy of poetic description. She claims that his poems lead to an account of "the totality of man's view of the universe and his relationship to it." She compares Ponge's poems in Le parti pris des choses to blocks of marble; words are the raw materials, and the objects Ponge describes "emerge as do figures from stone." While she accepts that these poems are like fables in that they use objects to "point to a veiled meaning," she claims that they are not conventional fables because their purpose is not to moralize. Instead, they show the reader that "the condition of life is mortality, but in death there is life," and through his poems he describes the weapons against mortality.
