= Frédéric Berthet =

French writer (1954–2003)

- Born: 20 August 1954; Neuilly-sur-Seine
- Died: 25 December 2003 (aged 49); Paris
- Occupation: Writer
- Years active: 1986–1996

Frédéric Berthet (20 August 1954 – 25 December 2003) was a 20th-century French writer.

== Biography ==
A former student of the École Normale Supérieure (1974-1977), Frédéric Berthet is a resident at the Bibliothèque nationale de France where he notably worked on the "fonds Barrès".

Frédéric Berthet was cultural attaché in New York from 1984 to 1987. Pierre Bayard, One of his comrades in the École Normale and friend, said of him: "He had a fascinating aura, thanks to his prestigious associations:Barthes, Sollers, Julia Kristeva... But most of all, he was very funny. [...] Thanks to him I discovered Fitzgerald, Philip Roth, Brautigan, Evelyn Waugh"....

Five books were published during his lifetime, in the space of ten years. Simple journée d'été, which the author himself defined as a "suite" of short stories, in the musical sense of the term, appeared in Denoël's L'Infini series in January 1986. Notably, this first publication contained no mention of genre or literary format. Daimler s'en va, a new incursion into the "romanesque territory," according to his own terms, was published in the same series, now at Gallimard, in May 1988. The book, praised in particular in Le Monde by Bertrand Poirot-Delpech, who devoted the work his entire column, experienced a critical success. From then on, and although the title of this novel invited to reflection like the last word of his narrative to silence, each of Frédéric Berthet's books was awaited with curiosity.

In January 1993, appeared simultaneously Felicidad, his second collection of short stories (L'Infini's headline read "Nouvelles du front"), and Paris-Berry (that of the "Blanche Collection" read "Counter-attack"), a short story as unclassifiable as the preceding ones, but which aroused in the press a wave of interrogations, if not indignations: a bit casual, was this irruption in the mythical collection of Gallimard a provocation?

His last book, Le Retour de Bouvard et Pécuchet was published by Éditions du Rocher in March 1996.

The literary work of Frédéric Berthet, however, began in 1970. He was 16 years old. Over the course of these thirty-three years, his literary activity was carried out in various forms: essays, lectures, communications, interviews, translations, articles and press columns... Their reading reveals today that each of these events participated of the same topicality of thought: the realization of a "program" formulated since 1970 and remained in suspense the day after his disappearance.

Frédéric Berthet lived in Chambon-sur-Voueize since 1993.

== Work ==
- 1986: Simple journée d'été (short stories), Éditions Denoël
- 1988: Daimler s'en va (novel), Éditions Gallimard, Prix Roger Nimier 1989
- 1993: Felicidad (short stories), Gallimard, prix de la nouvelle Académie française 1993)
- 1993: Paris-Berry (narration), Gallimard
- 1996: Le Retour de Bouvard & Pécuchet, Le Rocher

=== Posthumous editions ===
- 2006: Journal de Trêve (literary diary 1979–1982), followed by Lettre à Saul Bellow, Gallimard
- 2011: Correspondances 1973–2003 (selection of letters), La Table Ronde

=== Literary magazines ===
- 2007: Rouge, Blanc, Noir & Or (short story), La Nouvelle Revue française n° 580, Gallimard
- 2007: The Book of Truce (abstract of Journal de Trêve, translation by Linda Coverdale), "The Reading Room" n° 7, New York: Great Marsh Press
- 2008: La Petite en enfer (short story), Décapage n° 33, La Table Ronde
- 2011: En paix (chronique de presse), Décapage n° 43, La Table Ronde
- 2012: Ce qu'ils appelaient désespoir (short story), L'Infini n° 121, Gallimard
- 2013: Time-Lapse (abstract of Préparatifs de roman 1976–1979), La Revue Singulière
