= Paradis (novel) =

1981 French novel

- Cover of French edition published by Editions Points
- Author: Philippe Sollers
- Language: French
- Genre: Fiction
- Publisher: Éditions du Seuil
- Publication date: 1981
- Publication place: France
- Media type: Print
- Pages: 347 pp.
- ISBN: 978-2020499965

Paradis is a 1981 novel by French novelist Philippe Sollers. Sollers conceived the book as a literary homage to Dante's Paradiso. Noted by critics for its lack of punctuation, Paradis has been compared to The Cantos of Ezra Pound and Joyce's Finnegans Wake. Paradis was published in three volumes: Paradis, followed later by Paradis II and Paradis III.

== Overview ==
Sollers described the origins of Paradis as being traceable to a "creative rage" that first resulted in his book Lois, which marked a departure from the "slightly obsessive ascetic" mode in which he wrote his books Drame and Nombres, books which he characterized as representing a "period of research into the disposition of writing methods."

Sollers said of the book's title, Paradis:

[It] implies a rewriting of Dante's Paradiso, but it's a paradise that has changed a good deal since Dante's time. Perhaps the phrase which best gives the sense of my title is a sentence from Sade, who says, "Everything is paradise in this hell." I am off to palm off as pleasurable, or at least acceptable, all that would ordinarily be more disturbing, both spiritually and physically. My approach has changed because I've focused attention more radically and integrally on the Bible.

Sollers commented that the book reflects his interest in the "unprecedented period of flux or mutation" of Western culture:

[M]y work on Paradis concentrates on that point. I'm not speaking only of the New Testament. Obviously, I describe Christianity as an adventure at once pathetic and comic. I was inspired by Joyce in this.

== Critical reception ==
Poet and literary critic Hilary Anne Clark has commented on the formal difficulties that Paradis presents to readers:

Philippe Sollers' Paradis contains a ... major block to comprehension in that it lacks any form of visual punctuation to guide the reader in making sense, in reconstituting its units of meaning. Each page of Paradis is a solid, unbroken mass of words, whose visual density is further emphasized by the use of a very black, italicized typescript. Lacking the visual landmarks provided by conventional punctuation practice, the reader can neither encompass the entire work, nor often decide where one unit of sense takes up from a preceding unit or gives way to a succeeding one.

Clark goes on to cite Paradis as an example of an encyclopedic tendency in literature, comparing it to Joyce's Finnegans Wake and Pound's Cantos:

The dominance of the encyclopaedic gesture in Finnegans Wake, Paradis and the Cantos allows us to account for the characteristic length, obscurity and "bookishness" of these works; they absorb the traits and tensions of essay, Menippean satire and epic while yet exceeding these traits in their fictional translation of the encyclopaedic paradoxes noted above. This translation manifests itself in each work as a characteristic parodic hesitation before the authority of totalizing predecessors; it manifests itself in the texts' fascination with images of a paradisiacal completion and timelessness, a tendency that is undercut by a repetitive, digressive or fragmented form which asserts the inevitability of time and incompletion. Further, the Wake, Paradis and the Cantos, in their overt and extensive intertextual activity, emphasize the textual boundaries of encyclopaedic knowledge. Nonetheless, in their foregrounding and valorization of speech rhythms, the works also repeat the challenge that the encyclopaedia brings to its own limited nature as written book.

Critics Philip Barnard and Cheryl Lester note that in Paradis, "Sollers achieved a tour de force of modernist poetics whose clear precedents are Joyce and Faulkner. The powerful narrative voice that emerges in these works foregrounds song, chant, psalmody, and real rhythms that point toward their sources in sacred texts and Dantean epos."

Roland Champagne, in his monograph on Philippe Sollers, writes that

The humor of Paradis is found in its game of messages embedded in apparently unrelated sequences of spoken text. The messages are inserted by the omniscient voice of the poet/writer for the reader to decipher. These are encoded signals that the poet/writer offers as guides through the text. The poet/writer is basically saying that he is the only one who can find the way through this maze of contemporary culture's language.

French literary critic Roland Barthes grouped Paradis with three other books by Sollers, Drame, H, and Lois, and described these four as books that

have to be referred to as novels because there is no other term to designate them. But they do not tell stories, describe a particular society or present identifiable characters. They are texts of which language itself is the subject, language which is wholly free from the duty to describe. The world which these texts presents is not one which the reader could either identify as her own or see clearly as different from it. In the past, in Barthes' view it was the author's duty to describe such a world which held language unjustifiably captive. One of the reasons he writes with such enthusiasm about Sollers is the way in which texts such as Paradis and Lois show what happens when this duty is removed.

== Paradis in translation ==
Paradis has not been translated into English in its entirety, although an English-language excerpt was published in an issue of TriQuarterly devoted to works that reflect the influence of Joyce's Finnegans Wake.

== Sources ==
- Barnard, Philip; Lester, Cheryl (1988). "Philippe Sollers: Femmes". Yale French Studies (After the Age of Suspicion: The French Novel Today (Special Issue)): 163–166. doi:10.2307/2929366. ISBN 0-300-04386-4. JSTOR 2929366.
- Barthes, Roland (1987). Writer Sollers. Minneapolis: University of Minnesota Press. ISBN 0-8166-1627-2.
- Champagne, Roland (1996). Philippe Sollers. Atlanta: Editions Rodopi. ISBN 978-9042000049.
- Clark, Hilary Anne (1985). The Idea of a Fictional Encyclopaedia: Finnegans Wake, Paradis, the Cantos (Ph.D. thesis). University of British Columbia.
- Hayman, David (1978). "An Interview with Philippe Sollers". In Hayman, David; Anderson, Elliott (eds.). In the Wake of the Wake. Madison: University of Wisconsin Press. pp. 122–141. ISBN 0-299-07600-8.
- Sollers, Philippe (1978). "From Paradis". In Hayman, David; Anderson, Elliott (eds.). In the Wake of the Wake. Translated by Carl Lovitt. Madison: University of Wisconsin Press. pp. 101–106. ISBN 0-299-07600-8.
- Sollers, Philippe (1981). Paradis. Paris: Éditions du Seuil. ISBN 978-2020499965.
