= Women (Sollers novel) =

1983 novel by Philippe Sollers

- French 1983 edition
- Author: Philippe Sollers
- Original title: Femmes
- Translator: Barbara Bray
- Language: French
- Genre: Fiction
- Publisher: Columbia University Press
- Publication date: 1983
- Publication place: France
- English publication date: December 1990
- Media type: Print
- Pages: 559 pp.
- ISBN: 978-0231065467

Women (French: Femmes) is a 1983 novel by French novelist Philippe Sollers. First published in English translation in 1990, Women marked Sollers's move to a more accessible form of fiction writing after a series of difficult experimental texts. The novel was a best-seller in France and attracted attention as a roman à clef that contained recognizable portraits of significant French intellectual figures, such as Louis Althusser, Roland Barthes, Jacques Lacan, and Sollers himself.

== Plot summary ==
Will is an American journalist living in Paris. On leave from his duties writing about international politics at the Journal, he travels around the globe as he works on a novel in which he intends to expose the domination of the world by women. Through his friend Kate, Will has become aware of a secret international organization called the World Organization for Male Annihilation and a New Natality, or WOMANN, that intends to stage a secret takeover of world power. WOMANN's secret manifesto details a plan to take over the world by strictly controlling the reproductive process through the use of abortion, sperm banks, and artificial insemination; by expurgating, banning, or "contextualizing" the products of certain male geniuses; and also by declaring war on the patriarchal tyranny of religion through a campaign of "divide and rule." Will, who is a freethinker and notorious womanizer, is marked as an enemy by WOMANN. The novel follows Will's sexual escapades around the world with a number of women whose interest in the novel he is writing (the novel we are reading) leads him to suspect he is being surveilled by WOMANN. Will has enlisted a notorious French novelist, "S." (who bears significant similarities to Philippe Sollers), to publish the novel under S's name since Will is worried about the response of his family in the United States if he were to publish it under his own name. Will's monologue about his life and opinions includes extended digressions about such topics as politics, literature, sex, contemporary life, religion, and the Bible. Will's amorous exploits are occasionally interrupted by time spent at home with his wife, Deb, and his son Stephen. He is eventually injured in a terrorist attack that kills his lover Cyd, an English TV journalist. The novel concludes with Will leaving Paris to start a new life with Deb and Stephen in New York City.

== Reception ==
Readers and critics greeted Women enthusiastically when the book was first published in France in 1983. The novel was a best-seller in France and was celebrated by critics as "one of the best books in recent years." Roland Champagne, in his book-length survey of Sollers's career, attributed the book's popularity to the "sense of humor that [Sollers] exhibits with his narrating voice," and went on to say that the character of Will, the protagonist of Women, is emblematic of Sollers's tendency to model his protagonists on himself, a dynamic Champagne described as "the self as humorous other."

Elaine Kendall, writing in the Los Angeles Times, called Women "ferociously misogynistic" and wrote that the novel "splinters into frank pornography." Kendall went on to say that "Women may be the first pointillist post-feminist novel," and contended that "Women stridently demands to be taken seriously as a nihilistic satire on philosophy, religion, the arts, social science, America, France, and whatever else swims into view."

Other reviewers were less troubled by the ostensibly misogynist content. Leon Roudiez, writing in World Literature Today, maintained that in opposition to the book's "macho rhythm," Sollers's writing in Women also displayed "a female tide that gives it a complex, perplexing quality." Roudiez went on to praise Women as "a personal prospect of the intellectual, literary, and political scene during the past few years as well as an account of [Sollers's] own concerns and obsessions." Roudiez was laudatory in his assessment, calling Women "a book that should be read by all those interested in the contemporary scene as well as those who might be troubled by Bataille's notion of eroticism as the sanctioning of life unto death." Roudiez contended that the book "might teach us more about contemporary reality than the ponderous writings of historians could do."

The Antioch Review, in its assessment of Women, hailed the novel as "a very interesting trip into the fantastic mental Odyssey of a modern writer." In particular, the Antioch Review found Will to be a fascinating character, describing him as "witty, aggressive, narcissistic, and driven by the relentless desire to explore contemporary life."

The London Review of Books gave a more measured assessment of Women and emphasized the correspondences between the characters in the novel and real luminaries from the French literary and philosophical world: "Women is not only, as the title suggests, a kiss-and-tell epic ... but an explicit roman à clef containing mildly scandalous and instantly recognizable portraits of such celebrated figures as Lacan, Althusser, and Barthes." Conceding that Women is "infectiously high-spirited at times," the reviewer concluded that the book seemed "not so much a machine to think as a machine for ego-massaging.... Whether Woman adds to or detracts from Philippe Sollers's notoriety is, in the end, a pretty trivial question."

Susan Ireland, writing about Women for The Review of Contemporary Fiction, recommended the book, stating that "those willing to join Sollers in his playful romp through Parisian literary milieux may well enjoy the social satire and the effervescent virtuosity of his style."

Extended considerations of Women appear in the book-length treatments of Sollers's oeuvre by Roland Champagne and Malcolm Pollard. Champagne contends that despite Sollers's turn to a more straightforward narrative style than in his previous experimental works, this change "is undercut by the self-deprecating tone of the narrative voice." Champagne goes on to point out that Sollers's "style is not flatly sincere... the humor of Femmes is subtle because the sexism of the narrator and the other males is asserted by response to the assertive threats of the women characters."

Both Roland Champagne and Malcolm Pollard see Sollers's fascination with William de Kooning as central to the novel, and crucial to understanding novel's perspective on women. "The feminine side of De Kooning intrigues Sollers and might be very similar to the side of Sollers that is suggested in the portrayal of women in Femmes. The desires of women are not obvious to men and yet both of these artists, De Kooning and Sollers, involve their own eroticism in a fascination with desiring women." Pollard argues that Sollers sees De Kooning as an "ally" for his narrator since De Kooning's life, like Will's, is marked by battle against dogmatic enemies. Pollard identifies an "analogy ... between De Kooning as a painter attacked for the form and content of his art, and Will as narrator concerned with the threat posed to freedom of expression in the novel."

An English-language excerpt from Women was published in Yale French Studies in 1988, and Women appeared in an English translation by Barbara Bray in 1990.

== Sources ==
- Barnard, Philip; Lester, Cheryl (1988). "Philippe Sollers: Femmes". Yale French Studies (After the Age of Suspicion: The French Novel Today (Special Issue)): 163–166. doi:10.2307/2929366. ISBN 0-300-04386-4. JSTOR 2929366.
- Champagne, Roland (1996). Philippe Sollers. Atlanta: Rodopi. ISBN 978-9042000049.
- Ireland, Susan (Summer 1991). "Review of Women". The Review of Contemporary Fiction. 11 (2): 229.
- Kendall, Elaine (21 December 1990). "A Pointillist Novel Best Seen from a Distance". Los Angeles Times. p. E-9.
- Parrinder, Patrick (10 January 1991). "Funny Old Fame". London Review of Books. 13 (1): 18.
- Pollard, Malcolm Charles (1994). The Novels of Philippe Sollers: Narrative and the Visual. Atlanta: Brill Rodopi. ISBN 978-90-5183-707-0.
- Roudiez, Leon (Autumn 1983). "Review of Femmes". World Literature Today. 57 (4): 602. doi:10.2307/40139125. JSTOR 40139125.
- Sollers, Philippe (1983). Femmes. Paris: Gallimard. ISBN 9782070376209.
- Sollers, Philippe (1990). Women. Translated by Barbara Bray. New York: Columbia University Press. ISBN 978-0231065474.
- "Review of Women". Antioch Review. 49 (3): 473. Summer 1991. JSTOR 4612440.
