= Jean-Pierre Thiollet =

French writer and journalist (born 1956)

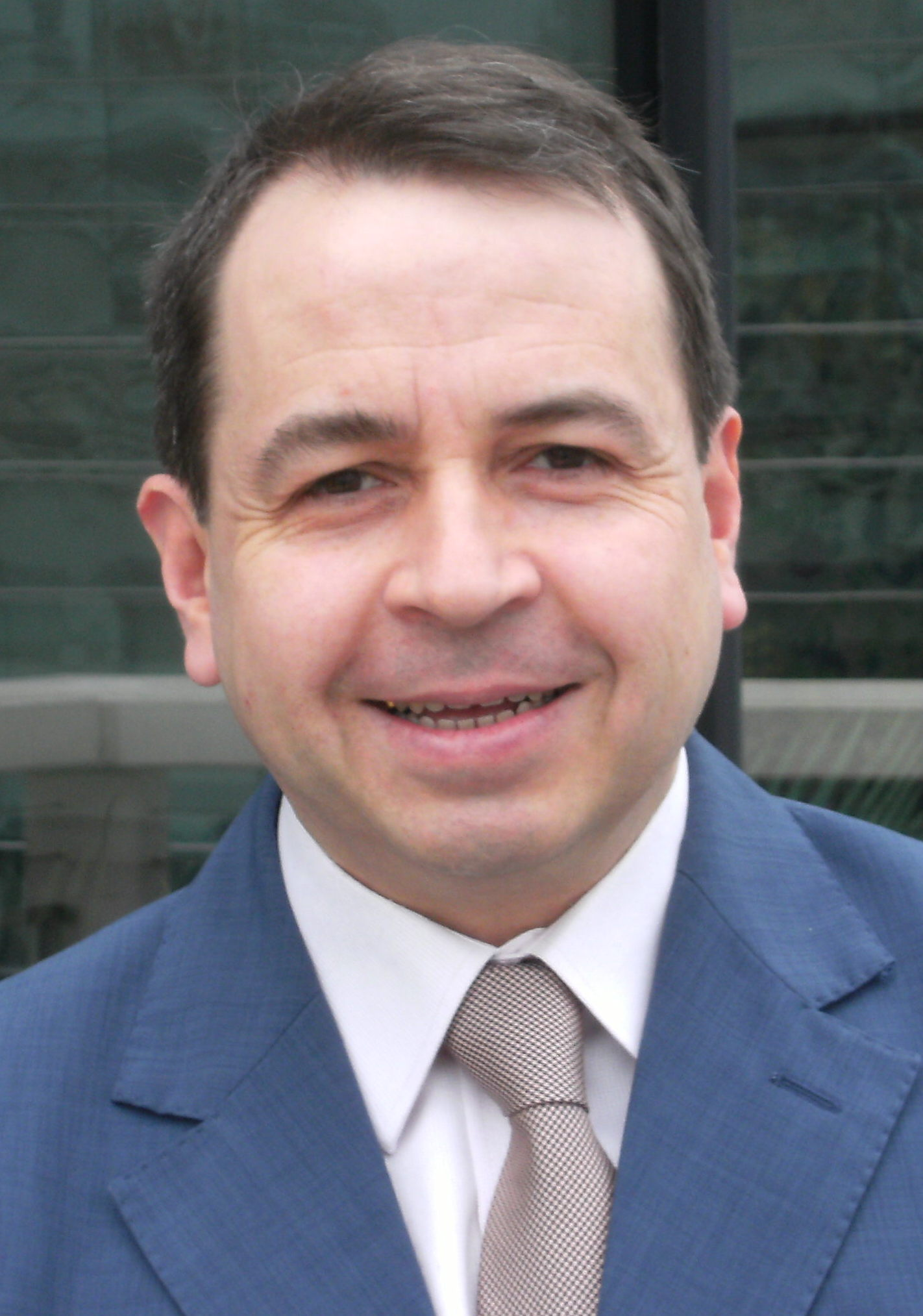
- Born: 9 December 1956 (age 69); Poitiers, France
- Education: Sorbonne Nouvelle University Paris 3
- Occupations: Writer, columnist
- Writing career
- Language: French
- Notable works: Sax, Mule & Co (2004); Je m'appelle Byblos (2005); Barbey d'Aurevilly (2006); Carré d'Art : Byron, Barbey d'Aurevilly, Dalí, Hallier (2008); Bodream (2010); Piano ma non solo (2012), Hallier, l'Edernel jeune homme (2016)

Jean-Pierre Thiollet (French: [ʒɑ̃pjɛʁ tjɔlɛ]; born 9 December 1956) is a French writer and journalist. He is also affiliated with the European Confederation of Independent Trade Unions, a European trade union.

== Career ==
Thiollet attended a school in Châtellerault, in Poitiers he attended classes préparatoires aux grandes écoles and acquired a degree in Parisian universities (Pantheon-Sorbonne University, University of Paris III:Sorbonne Nouvelle, Paris-Sorbonne University).

In 1978, he was admitted to Saint-Cyr (Coëtquidan), a French military academy.

During the 1980s and early 1990s, he was a member of a French press organization that focused on music halls, the circus, dance and the arts.

From 1982 to 1986, his telephone conversations with writer Jean-Edern Hallier were monitored as part of illegal wiretaps conducted during the presidency of François Mitterrand. In the late 1980s, he served as vice president of Amiic, a Geneva-based real estate investment organization. He was a lecturer at international meetings of the organization, which was dissolved in 1997. In the early 1990s, he contributed as a writer and art critic for the French magazine L'Amateur d'Art. From 1988 to 1994, he was editor-in-chief for Le Quotidien de Paris.

During the 1997 parliamentary elections, he served as Communications Director and as a member of the Mayor's Cabinet. Later that year, he published Le Chevallier à découvert (Laurens, Paris). In 1999, he co-produced Studies (Chopin) recorded by Radoslav Kvapil. From 1999 to 2001, he was the Company Secretary of Mea Publications Limited in the United Kingdom. Since 2007, he has been a member of the World Grand Family of Lebanon (RJ Lebanon Club).

In 2009, Thiollet signed a petition in support of the film director Roman Polanski, calling for his release after Polanski was arrested in Switzerland in relation to his 1977 charge for drugging and raping a 13-year-old girl. From 2009 to 2012, he worked as one of the France-Soir editors.

In October 2016, after dedicating a book about Jean-Edern Hallier to "the youth native from Euroland, zone F, the victim of an old criminal political ruling class", he denounced in an interview "the French crime, committed by a political class, from the left as from the right".

In 2020, his wife, Monique, ran as a candidate in Châtellerault's municipal elections with support from La République en Marche.. In March 2026, she was elected municipal councillor and community councillor, then appointed deputy mayor.

In 2025, he wrote the preface to "Présences", a collection of poems by Michèle Gabillas-Bazin.

== Selected bibliography ==
- Hallier de A à Z. L'esprit à l'oeuvre, volume 1, with text by François Roboth, Neva Editions, 2025.ISBN 978-2-35055-322-1
- Hallier, chagrins d'amour, with text by François Roboth, Neva Editions, 2024.ISBN 978-2-35055-313-9
- Hallier, tout feu tout flamme, with text by François Roboth, Neva Editions, 2023.ISBN 978-2-35055-309-2
- Hallier en roue libre, with texts by François Roboth, Neva Editions, 2022.ISBN 978-2-35055-305-4
- Hallier, L'Edernel retour, with texts by François Roboth, Neva Editions, 2021.ISBN 978-2-35055-295-8
- Hallier, L'Homme debout, with texts by François Roboth, Neva Editions, 2020.ISBN 978-2-35055-285-9
- Hallier Edernellement vôtre, with texts by Isabelle Coutant-Peyre and François Roboth, Neva Editions, 2019. ISBN 978-2-35055-273-6
- Hallier ou l'Edernité en marche, with text by François Roboth, Neva Editions, 2018. ISBN 978-2-35055-247-7
- Improvisation so piano, with texts by Bruno Belthoise, Jean-Louis Lemarchand and François Roboth, Neva éditions, Paris, 2017. ISBN 978-2-35055-228-6
- Hallier, l'Edernel jeune homme, with texts by Gabriel Enkiri and François Roboth, Neva éditions, Paris, 2016. ISBN 978-2-35055-217-0
- Créer ou reprendre un commerce (Create or take over a business), Vuibert Ed., Paris, 2011 (3rd ed). ISBN 978-2-7117-6462-4
- Bodream ou rêve de Bodrum, Anagramme Ed., Paris, 2010. ISBN 978-2-35035-279-4
- Carré d'Art: Barbey d'Aurevilly, Lord Byron, Salvador Dalí, Jean-Edern Hallier, with texts by Anne-Élisabeth Blateau and François Roboth, Anagramme Ed., Paris, 2008. ISBN 978-235035-189-6
- Les Risques du manager, with A. Kibarian, Vuibert Ed., Paris, 2008. ISBN 978-2-7117-8734-0
- La Fiscalité immobilière pour tous (Property taxation for all), Vuibert Ed, Paris, 20017.ISBN 978-2-7117-8769-2
- Barbey d'Aurevilly, with texts by Eugen Drewermann, Jean-Louis Christ and Bruno Bontempelli, H & D, 2006 (ISBN 2-914266-06-5) and 2007 (ISBN 2 914 266 08 1). With CDRom. ISBN 2-914266-06-5
- Foreword to Willy, Colette et moi by Sylvain Bonmariage, Anagramme Ed., 2004 (reprint). ISBN 2-914571-60-7
- Demain 2021 — Jean-Claude Martinez (book-length interview), G. de Bouillon, 2004. ISBN 9782841911615
- Les Dessous d'une Présidence, Anagramme Ed., 2002. ISBN 2-914571-14-3
- Beau linge et argent sale – Fraude fiscale internationale et blanchiment des capitaux (Tax Avoidance, Tax Evasion and Money Laundering), Anagramme Ed., 2002, ISBN 2-914571-17-8.
- La Pensée unique, collective work (with Jean Foyer), Economica/J. M. Chardon & D. Lensel Ed., 1998. ISBN 2-7178-3745-0
- Les baux sans peine (The leases without penalty), Axiome Ed., 1999. ISBN 978-2844620408
- La Vie plurielle (Conjugal life. Types of union in the new legislative arena : information for all on their advantages and disadvantages), Axiome Ed., 1999. ISBN 2-8446203-61
- Le Chevallier à découvert, Laurens Ed., 1998. ISBN 2-911838-51-3
- Euro-CV, Top Ed., 1997. ISBN 2-87731-131-7
- L'Anti-Crise, with M-F Guignard, Dunod, 1994. ISBN 2-10-002401-9
- Os très primeiros meses num novo emprego, with M-F Guignard, transl. Maria Mello, Biblioteca do desenvolivemento pessoal, Publicações Europa-América, Mem Martins, 1993. ISBN 972-1-03683-8 (Réussir ses trois premiers mois dans un nouveau poste, Nathan, Paris, 1992. ISBN 2-09-176362-4)
- Utrillo, collective work, F. Birr Ed., 1982. ISBN 2-85754-009-4
