= Philippe Forest =

French author and professor of literature

Philippe Forest (born 18 June 1962) is a French author and professor of literature. He has been awarded the First Novel Prix Femina (1997) and the Prix Décembre (2004), and his works have been translated into English, Italian, Spanish, Japanese, Korean, and Chinese. He has taught at several Universities, including Cambridge, Edinburgh, and Saint-Andrews, and the University of Nantes.

== Publications ==
Novels, French

- L'enfant éternel (Prix Femina), Gallimard, 1997; Folio, 1998
- Toute la nuit, Gallimard, 1999
- Sarinagara (Prix Décembre), Gallimard 2004; Folio, 2006
- Le Nouvel Amour, Gallimard, 2007
- Le siècle des nuages, Gallimard, 2010

Novels, translated

- Sarinagara, Mercury House, 2009

Essays

- Philippe Sollers, Seuil, 1992
- Camus, Marabout, 1992
- Le Mouvement surréaliste, Vuibert, 1994
- Textes et labyrinthes : Joyce, Kafka, Muir, Borges, Butor, Robbe-Grillet, éd. Inter-universitaires, 1995
- Histoire de Tel Quel, Seuil, 1995
- Oé Kenzaburô, Pleins Feux, 2001
- Le roman, le je, Pleins Feux, 2001
- Près des acacias, l'autisme, une énigme (avec des photos d'Olivier Menanteau), Actes Sud/ 3CA, 2002
- Raymond Hains, uns roman, Gallimard 2004
- La beauté du contresens et autres essais sur la littérature japonaise (Allaphbed 1), Cécile Defaut, 2005
- De Tel Quel à L'Infini, nouveaux essais (Allaphbed 2), Cécile Defaut, 2006
- Le Roman, le réel et autres essais (Allaphbed 3), Cécile Defaut, 2007
- Tous les enfants sauf un, Gallimard, 2007
- Aragon, Gallimard, 2015 (Prix Goncourt de la biographie)
- Une fatalité de bonheur, Grasset, 2016

Napoléon 1er. La fin et le commencement, Gallimard, 2020
