= Writer Sollers =

Book by Roland Barthes

- Cover of the first edition
- Author: Roland Barthes
- Original title: Sollers écrivain
- Language: French
- Publication date: 1979
- Publication place: France

Writer Sollers (French: Sollers écrivain) is a short book published in 1979 by the French literary critic Roland Barthes. In his discussion of the controversial French writer Philippe Sollers, Barthes raises critical issues of central importance such as the nature of narrative, the theory of language, the problems of traditional realism and the relationship between literature and politics.
