= Watteau in Venice =

1991 novel by Philippe Sollers

Watteau in Venice: A Novel
- Author: Philippe Sollers
- Original title: La fête à Venise
- Translator: Alberto Manguel
- Cover artist: Canaletto, Regatta On The Grand Canal – 1730–35
- Language: English
- Genre: Fiction
- Published: New York: C. Scribner's Sons, 1994 (first English edition)
- Media type: Book
- Pages: 240
- ISBN: 9780684194516
- OCLC: 30155464

Watteau in Venice (French: La fête à Venise) is a novel by French author Philippe Sollers published in 1991 by Editions Gallimard, later translated into English by Alberto Manguel, and then published in 1994 by Charles Scribner's Sons.

The novel is a satirical story of art theft in Venice, including a romance with an American art student and frequent references to art. Ann Irvine of 'Library Journal' describes it as "a clever and sophisticated work that will appeal most to those who know European art and music." Alexander Theroux of Review of Contemporary Fiction is less complimentary: "...all of it comprising a kind of Art Crit 301 strung to a weak detective story – the novel hasn't a smidge of drama – gave Sollers to believe he had a good idea for a novel. Sadly, he did not."
