= Marcelin Pleynet =

French poet, art critic and essayist

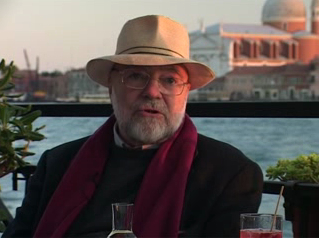
Marcelin Pleynet, Venice, 2006

Marcelin Pleynet (born 23 December 1933, in Lyon, France) is a French poet, art critic and essayist. He was Managing Editor of the influential magazine Tel Quel from 1962 to 1982, and co-edited the journal L'Infini (Gallimard) with Philippe Sollers. He was Professor of Aesthetics at the École nationale supérieure des Beaux-Arts in Paris from 1987 to 1998. He has published numerous monographs on 20th-century art, notably Situation de l’art moderne: Paris-New York (in association with William Rubin), Henri Matisse, Robert Motherwell: La vérité en peinture, Les Modernes et la tradition, Les États-Units de la peinture and L’art abstrait. He has also published books of poetry and the novel Prise d’otage, and an edition of Giorgione et les deux Vénus.

== Bibliography ==
=== Essays ===
- Le savoir-vivre, Gallimard, 2006
- Alechinsky le pinceau voyageur, Gallimard, 2002
- Rothko et la France, L'épure Eds, 1999
- Rimbaud en son temps, Gallimard, 2005
- Judit Reigl, L'insolite-Adam Biro, 2001
- Les voyageurs de l'an 2000, Gallimard, 2000
- Poésie et "révolution", la révolution du style, Pleins Feux Eds, 2000
- Chardin - Le sentiment et l'esprit du temps, L'épure Eds, 1999
- Rothko et la France, L'épure Eds, 1999
- Notes sur le motif suivi de La Dogana, Dumerchez Naoum, 1998
- Lautréamont, Seuil, 1998
- L'homme habite poétiquement, Actes Sud, 1998
- Une saison, Dumerchez Naoum, 1996
- Henri Matisse, Gallimard, 1993
- Les modernes et la tradition, Gallimard, 1990
- L'Art abstrait, tome 5 (avec Michel Ragon), Adrien Maeght, 1988
- New-York Series, les sculptures en cire de Félix Rozen, galerie Gary, Paris, 1979/88
- Les Etats-Unis de la peinture, Seuil, 1986
- Fenêtre sur le Japon, exhibition of Félix Rozen, Central color Paris, 1986
- La place de Félix Rozen dans l'art contemporain (Situation pièce, Centre d'Action Culturelle, Saint Brieux, text read by the author), 1984
- Painting and System, Univ of Chicago, 1984
- Modernism-Modernity and the Philosophy of History, NSCAD Univ Press, 1983/2004

=== Poetry ===
- Le Pontos, Gallimard, 2002
- Premières poésies, Cadex, 1988
- Fragments du choeur - vers et proses, Denoël, 1984
- Le propre du temps, Gallimard, 1995
- Stanze, Seuil, 1973

=== Novels ===
- Prise d'otage, Gallimard 1986
- La vie à deux ou à trois, Gallimard, 1992
