= Jean-Pierre Faye =

French philosopher and writer (1925–2026)

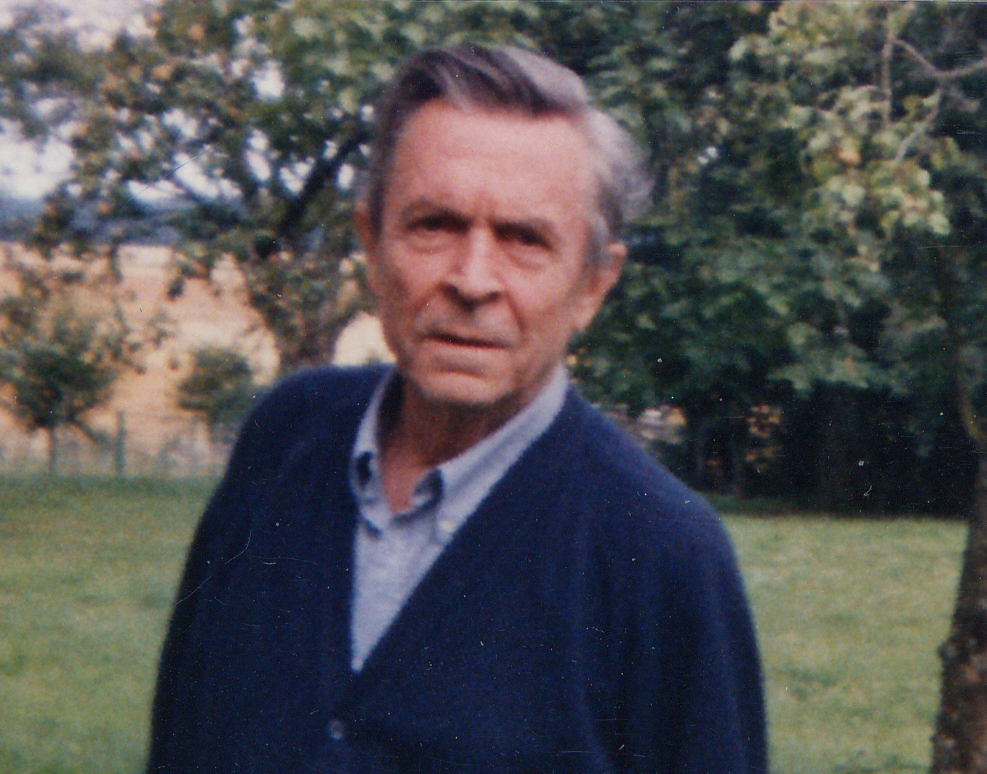
- Faye in 2002
- Born: 19 July 1925; Paris, France
- Died: 26 March 2026 (aged 100); Toulouse, France
- Occupations: Philosopher, writer
- Known for: Horseshoe theory

Jean-Pierre Faye (French: [ʒɑ̃pjɛʁ faj]; 19 July 1925 – 26 March 2026) was a French philosopher and writer of fiction and prose poetry.

== Life and career ==
Faye was born in Paris on 19 July 1925. He was a member of the editing committee of the avant-garde literary review Tel Quel, and later of Change. He received the Prix Renaudot for his 1964 novel L'Écluse (Éditions Seuil). He was a regular contributor to Gilles Deleuze's literary journal Chimère. With Jacques Derrida and others, he authored the "Blue Report" (French: Le rapport bleu), which led to the Collège international de philosophie in 1983. He soon turned against deconstructionism and postmodernism, as he reflected in Langages totalitaires 2: la raison narrative (1995). His essays, including Théorie du récit and Langages Totalitaires, remain influential studies of the use and abuse of language by totalitarian states and ideologies. Faye is credited with creating the horseshoe theory.

== Death ==
Faye died in Toulouse on 26 March 2026, at the age of 100.

== Select bibliography ==
- Dictionnaire politique portatif en cinq mots: démagogie, terreur, tolérance, répression, violence. Essai de philosophie politique. Gallimard, 1982.
- Balthus : les dessins. Adam Biro, 1998. ISBN 978-2-87660-231-1.
- Concepts number 7: Jean-Pierre Faye et la Philosophie. Sils Maria, 2005. ISBN 978-2-930242-44-6.
- Introduction aux langages totalitaires : Théorie et Transformations du récit. Revised edition Hermann, 2003. ISBN 978-2-7056-6450-3.
- Journal du voyage absolu : Jeux et enjeux du Grand Danger, accompagné des Transformants féminins. Hermann, 2003. ISBN 978-2-7056-6469-5.
- (with Anne-Marie de la Vilaine) La déraison antisémite et son langage. Actes Sud, 1993. ISBN 978-2-7427-0094-3.
- La frontière: Sarajevo en archipel. Actes Sud, 1999. ISBN 978-2-7427-0601-3.
- Langages totalitaires. Reprinted Hermann, 2004. ISBN 978-2-7056-6480-0.
- La philosophie desormais. Colin, 2004. ISBN 978-2-200-26550-2.
- Le langage meurtrier. Hermann, 1996. ISBN 978-2-7056-6256-1.
- Le livre du vrai. Evénement violence. L'Harmattan, 1998. ISBN 978-2-7384-7148-2.
- Le Siècle des idéologies. Agora, 2002. ISBN 978-2-266-10141-7.
- Nietzsche et Salomé. Ecrivains, 2000. ISBN 978-2-246-58591-6.
- (with Jacqueline Russ) Qu'est-ce que la philosophie? Colin, 1997. ISBN 978-2-200-01548-0.
