= L'Infini =

French literary collection and magazine

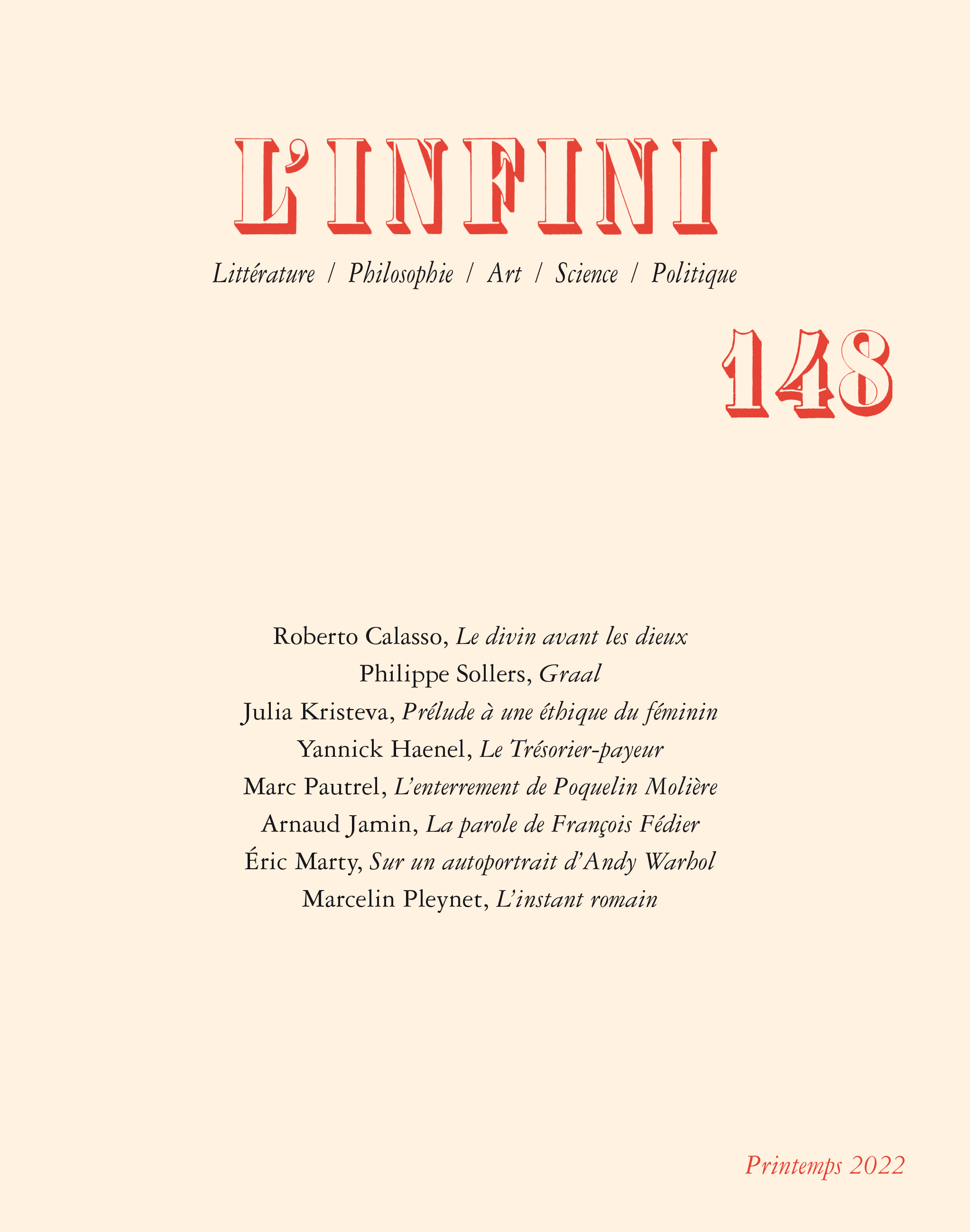
L'Infini

L'Infini (in English Infinity) is a French literary collection and magazine, established in 1983 in Paris by Philippe Sollers as a follow-up of the magazine Tel Quel. The magazine was first published by Éditions Denoël and later on by Éditions Gallimard.

The magazine has published work by French authors, including its founder, Philippe Sollers, Louis-Ferdinand Céline, Julia Kristeva, Marcelin Pleynet, and other notable French writers and young authors such as Marc-Edouard Nabe, Pierre Bourgeade, François Meyronnis, Yannick Haenel, Frédéric Berthet, David di Nota, Clément Rosset, Alexandre Duval-Stalla, Chantal Thomas, Thomas A. Ravier, Cécile Guilbert, Bernard Sichère, Raphaël Denys, and Alessandro Mercuri. Others include Philip Roth and Milan Kundera.
