= Francis Ponge =

French essayist and poet

Ponge in later years

Francis Jean Gaston Alfred Ponge (French: [pɔ̃ʒ]; 27 March 1899 – 6 August 1988) was a French poet. He developed a form of prose poem, minutely examining everyday objects. He was the third recipient of the Neustadt International Prize for Literature in 1974.

== Life ==
Ponge was born into a Protestant family in Montpellier, the son of Armand Ponge, a banker, and his wife Juliette, née Saurel. He studied in Paris at the Sorbonne and the École de droit where he read law, In 1918–1919 he served in the French army. In 1919 he joined the Socialist Party.

Ponge worked for the Parisian publishing companies Gallimard (1923–1931) and Hachette (1931–1937), and before the outbreak of the Second World War he was briefly an insurance salesman. His earliest poems were published in 1923, and he established a reputation in French literary circles, principally for his contributions to the Nouvelle Revue Française. The editor of the publication, Jean Paulhan, became Ponge's mentor, and remained so for many years. Their correspondence continued until Paulhan's death in 1968. During the 1930s Ponge was for a short while associated with the Surrealist movement, influenced by which he joined the Communist Party in 1937.

During the Second World War, Ponge joined the French Resistance. He also worked for the National Committee of Journalists, 1942–1944 and was literary and artistic director of the communist weekly L'Action 1944–1946. He left the Communist Party in 1947. From 1952 to 1965 he held a professorship at the Alliance française in Paris. In 1966 and 1967 he was a visiting professor at Barnard College and Columbia University in the US.

In his later years Ponge was a recluse, living at his country house. He died in Le Bar-sur-Loup at the age of 89.

Awards made to Ponge included the Neustadt International Prize for Literature (1974), the Académie française's French National Poetry Prize (1981), and the Grand prix of the Société des gens de lettres (1985). He was a Commandeur of the Légion d'honneur (1983).

== Works ==
In his work, Le Parti pris des choses (often translated The Voice of Things), he meticulously described common things such as oranges, potatoes and cigarettes in a poetic voice, but with a personal style and paragraph form (prose poem) much like an essay.

Ponge avoided appeals to emotion and symbolism, and instead sought to minutely recreate the world of experience of everyday objects. He described his own works as "a description-definition-literary artwork" which avoided both the drabness of a dictionary and the inadequacy of poetry. His principal aim was to avoid stereotypical thinking. In Le Grand Recueil (The Grand Collection), published in 1961 he explained his "concentration on simple objects – stones, grass, directed towards a restoration of the power and purity of language," according to his obituary in The Times.

In 1967 he published his best-known work, Le Savon, translated as Soap (1969), a long prose poem that, in the words of The Times "is unique precisely because, and often very humorously, it exhausts the topic of the word and the thing." An extract from the original, and an English translation published in 1969, illustrate this:

Le Savon
Si je m'en frotte les mains, le savon écume, jubile...
Plus il les rend complaisantes, souples,
liantes, ductiles, plus il bave, plus
sa rage devient volumineuse et nacrée...
Pierre magique!
Plus il forme avec l'air et l'eau
des grappes explosives de raisins
parfumés...
L'eau, l'air et le savon
se chevauchent, jouent
à saute-mouton, forment des
combinaisons moins chimiques que
physiques, gymnastiques, acrobatiques...
Rhétoriques?
[...]

Soap
If I rub my hands with it, soap foams, exults...
The more complaisant it makes them, supple,
smooth, docile, the more it slobbers, the more
its rage becomes voluminous, pearly...
Magic stone!
The more it forms with air and water
clusters of scented grapes
explosive...
Water, air and soap
overlap, play
at leapfrog, form
combinations less chemical than
physical, gymnastical, acrobatical...
Rhetorical?
Translation by Lane Dunlop:

Other works include 'La Guêpe', a word play on the name of painter Émile Picq (1911–1951).

== Bibliography ==
- Le Parti pris des choses (1942)
- Proêmes (1948)
- La Rage de l'expression (1952)
- Le Grand Recueil (I. "Méthodes", 1961; II. "Lyres", 1961; III "Pièces", 1962)
- Pour un Malherbe (1965)
- Le Savon (1967) as Soap, Jonathan Cape, London
- Interviews with Philippe Sollers (1970)
- La Fabrique du Pré (1971)
- Comment une figue de paroles et pourquoi (1977)
- Pages d'atelier, 1917–1982 (Gallimard, 2005)

== Source of information and publicity for Francis Ponge's work ==
The association based on a suggestion of Armande Ponge (daughter of Odette and Francis Ponge) was founded by Jean-Marie Gleize in Paris in 2011 and was named Société des Lecteurs de Francis Ponge (S. L. F. P.). The Ordinary General Assembly take place once a year alternatively in Paris and in Lyon. The association is aimed not only at disseminating and promoting Ponge's writing, but also at encouraging cultural knowledge and research. It provided financing for the publication of the Society's bulletin replaced since 2017 by the Cahiers Francis Ponge published by Classiques Garnier. The Internet site (http://francisponge-slfp.ens-lyon.fr) offers news, historical as well as recent articles, links and contains some informations about Francis Ponge's works, letters and manuscripts and radio, video, photo archives.
