= Peter Szendy =

French philosopher and musicologist

Peter Szendy (born 1966 in Paris) is a French philosopher and musicologist. He is the David Herlihy Professor of Humanities and Comparative Literature at Brown University.

His Écoute, une histoire de nos oreilles (2001, English translation in 2008: Listen, A History of Our Ears) is a critique of Romantic and Modernist conceptions of listening. Paying close attention to arrangements as "signed listenings" and to the juridical history of the listener, Szendy suggests an alternative model based on deconstruction: listening, he argues (quoting C. P. E. Bach), is a "tolerated theft", and our ears are always already haunted by the ear of the other.

In Sur écoute. Esthétique de l'espionnage (2007), he draws on Foucault's analysis of the Panopticon and Deleuze's Postscript on the Societies of Control in order to show how the act of listening always entails issues of power and dominion. Sur écoute proposes an archeology of overhearing, following many paths, from the Bible to spy movies like Hitchcock's Torn Curtain or Coppola's The Conversation.

In Membres fantômes : des corps musiciens (2002), Szendy rethinks the concept of body as construed in the history of Western musical thought and sketches the outlines of a "general organology" based on the rhetorical concept of "effiction". In his book on Moby Dick (Prophecies of Leviathan. Reading Past Melville), he develops a theory of reading as prophecy, while reassessing Derrida's famous sentence: "il n'y a pas de hors-texte".

Hits: Philosophy in the jukebox (Tubes. La philosophie dans le juk-box, 2008) analyzes haunting melodies as powerful articulations or jointings between the psyche and the global market. Globalization becomes the key motive of Kant chez les extraterrestres: philosofictions cosmopolitiques (2011), a reading of Carl Schmitt and Kant that follows the trail of extraterrestrial presence in many of the philosopher's major works (from his Theory of Heavens to his anthropology from a Pragmatic Point of View). The specifically cosmopolitical dimension of mankind in Kant, Szendy argues, does not reside in the traditional, "vertical" definitions that locate man between the beast and the divine, but in the "horizontal" comparison that projects him in outer space.

Kant chez les extraterrestres draws on the two meanings of the Greek word kosmos, oscillating between cosmetics and cosmopolitics. In his latest book, L'apocalypse-cinéma. 2012 et autres fins du monde (2012), Szendy develops his reflections on the concept of world into a theory of film as a "cineworld" ("cinémonde") always exposed to its radical finitude.

== Publications (English) ==
- Listen: a history of our ears, with a foreword by Jean-Luc Nancy, Fordham University Press, 2008.
- Prophecies of Leviathan. Reading Past Melville, with an afterword by Gil Anidjar, Fordham University Press, 2010.
- Hits. Philosophy in the Jukebox, Fordham University Press, 2011.
- Kant in the Land of Extraterrestrials. Cosmopolitical Philosofictions, Fordham University Press, 2013.
- Phantom Limbs: On Musical Bodies, Fordham University Press, 2015.
- All Ears: The Aesthetics of Espionage, Fordham University Press, 2016.
- The Supermarket of the Visible: Toward a General Economy of Images, Fordham University Press, 2019.
- Powers of Reading: From Plato to Audiobooks, Zone Books, 2025.

== Publications (French) ==
- Theodor W. Adorno, Sur quelques relations entre musique et peinture, traduction française et préface de Peter Szendy, Éditions La Caserne, 1995.
- Lire l'Ircam, suivi d'un texte inédit de Gilles Deleuze, Ircam-Centre Pompidou, 1996.
- Musica practica : arrangements et phonographies de Monteverdi à James Brown, L'Harmattan, coll. « Esthétiques », 1997.
- Écoute : une histoire de nos oreilles, précédé de Ascoltando par Jean-Luc Nancy, Éditions de Minuit, 2001.
- Machinations de Georges Aperghis, Ircam-L'Harmattan, 2001.
- Membres fantômes : des corps musiciens, Minuit, 2002.
- Wonderland : la musique, recto-verso (avec Georges Aperghis), Bayard, 2004.
- Les prophéties du texte-Léviathan : lire selon Melville, Éditions de Minuit, 2004.
- Béla Bartók, Ecrits, traduction française et préface de Peter Szendy, Éditions Contrechamps, 2006.
- Sur écoute : esthétique de l'espionnage, Éditions de Minuit, 2007.
- Tubes : la philosophie dans le juke-box, Éditions de Minuit, 2008.
- Kant chez les extraterrestres : philosofictions cosmopolitiques, Éditions de Minuit, 2011.
- L'Apocalypse-cinéma : 2012 et autres fins du monde, Capricci, 2012.
- A Coups de points. La ponctuation comme expérience, Éditions de Minuit, 2013.
- Le Supermarché du visible, Éditions de Minuit, 2017.
- Pouvoirs de la lecture. De Platon au livre électronique, La Découverte, 2022.
