= Sophie Zhang =

Sophie Zhang may refer to:

- Sophie Zhang (whistleblower), data-analyst and Facebook whistleblower
- Zhang Xueying, Chinese actress whose English name is Sophie Zhang
