= Philippe Sollers =

French writer (1936–2023)

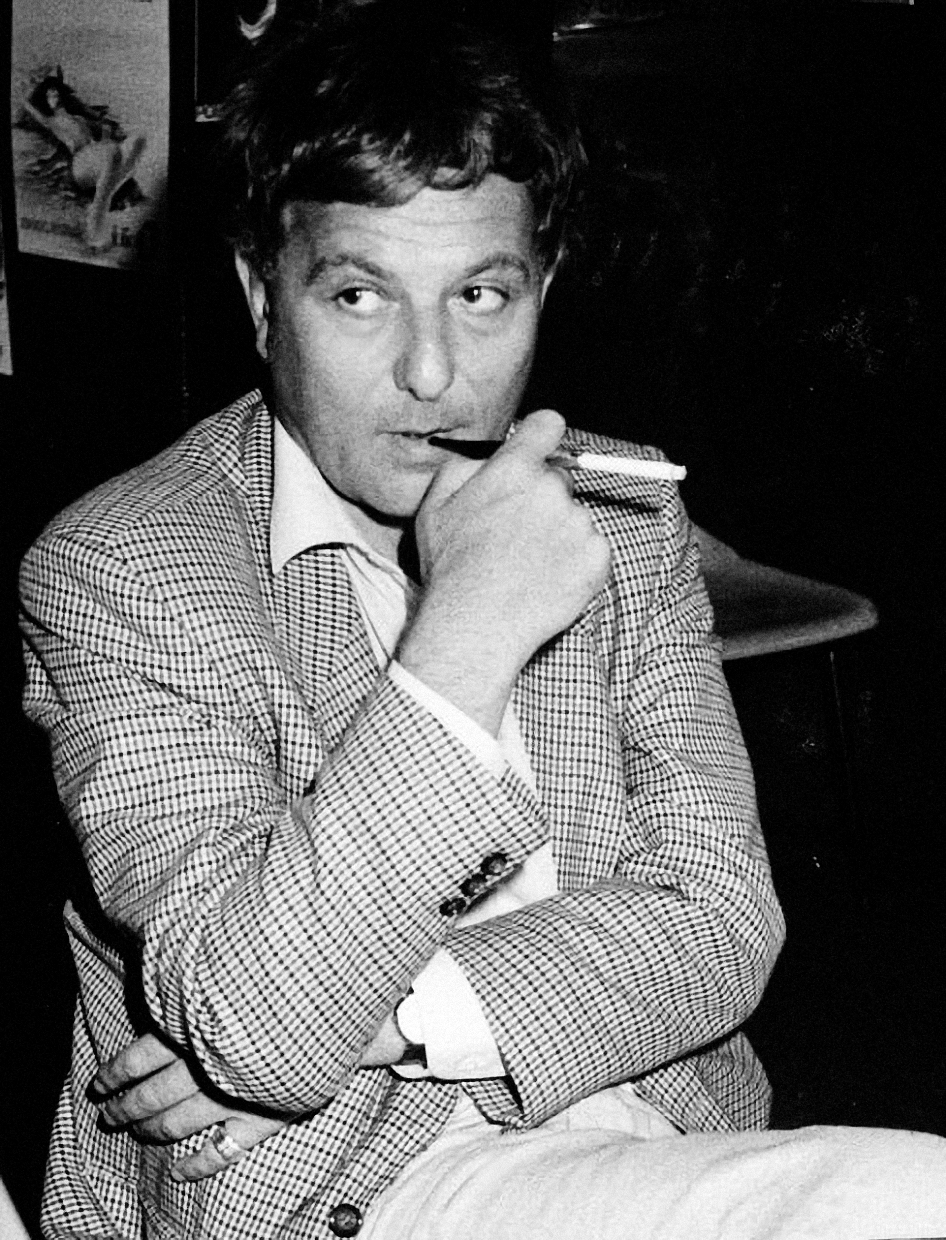
- Sollers in 1983
- Born: Philippe Joyaux; 28 November 1936; Talence, France
- Died: 5 May 2023 (aged 86); Paris, France
- Education: Lycée privé Sainte-Geneviève; ESSEC Business School
- Occupations: Writer, critic, editor
- Spouse: Julia Kristeva (m. 1967)

Philippe Sollers (French: [sɔlɛʁs]; born Philippe Joyaux; 28 November 1936 – 5 May 2023) was a French writer, critic and editor.

== Early life ==
Sollers was born as Philippe Joyaux on 28 November 1936, in Talence, France. His family ran the local Société Joyaux Frères, the iron factory Recalt producing material for kitchens, metal constructions and machines for the aircraft manufacturer SNCASO under the German military administration in occupied France during World War II. His parents were Octave Joyaux and Marcelle Molinié. He moved to Paris in 1955 and studied at the Lycée privé Sainte-Geneviève of Versailles and at the ESSEC Business School.

In Portrait du Joueur (1985), Sollers reflects on his upbringing as the child of a prosperous bourgeois family, weaving in the stories and legends surrounding his ancestry. Though he initially pursued studies in economics, preparing to assume management of his father’s factory, his early literary influences soon steered him in a different direction. Guiding him along this new path was his first mentor, the poet Francis Ponge, whose support and influence proved decisive.

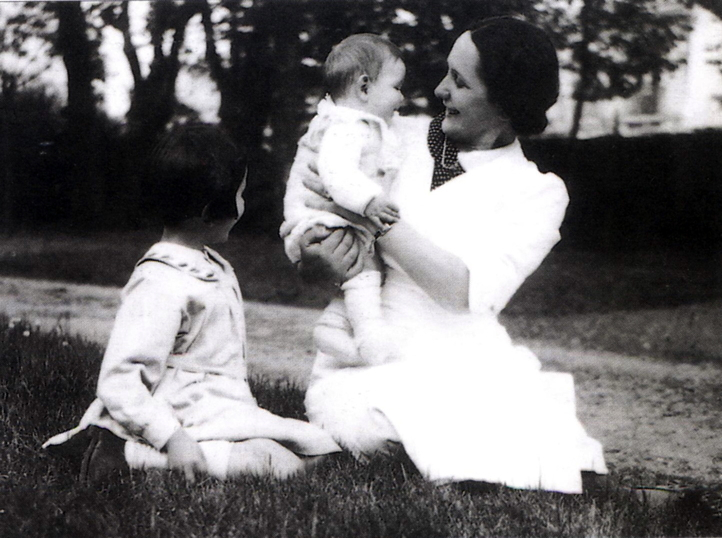
Philippe Sollers in Bordeaux in the homestead park in 1937 with his mother and his sister Annie.

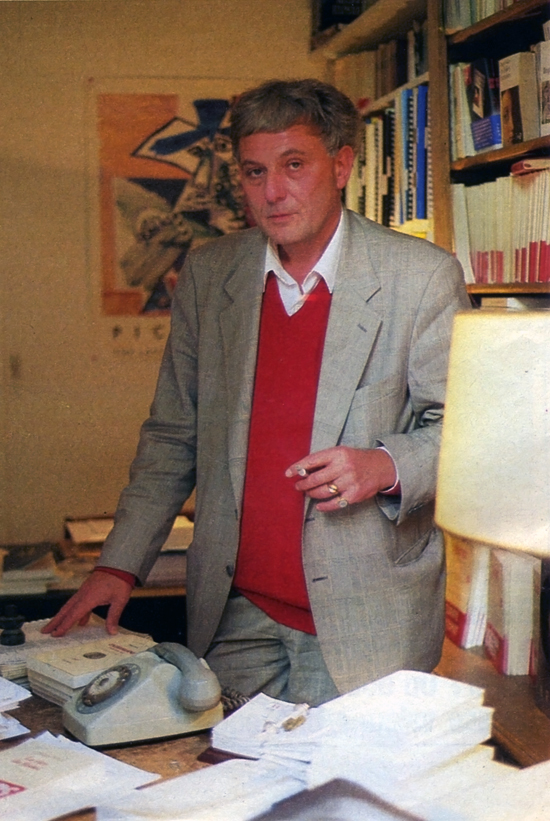
Sollers in 1992

== Work ==
Following his first novel, A Strange Solitude (1958), hailed by François Mauriac and Louis Aragon, Sollers began, with The Park (1961) the experiments in narrative form that would lead to Event (Drame, 1965) and Nombres (1968). Jacques Derrida analyzed these novels in his book Dissemination. Sollers then attempted to counter the high seriousness of Nombres in Lois (1972), which featured greater stylistic interest through the use of wordplay and a less formal style. The direction taken by Lois was developed through the heightened rhythmic intensity of non-punctuated texts such as Paradis (1981).

In 1960 he founded the avant garde literary journal Tel Quel along with writer and art critic Marcelin Pleynet, which was published by Le Seuil and ran until 1982. Sollers then created the journal L'Infini, published first by Denoël, then by Gallimard with Sollers remaining as sole editor and Pleynet as editorial secretary.

Sollers was at the heart of the period of intellectual fervour in the Paris of the 1960s and 1970s. He contributed to the publication of critics and thinkers such as Jacques Derrida, Jacques Lacan, Louis Althusser, and Roland Barthes. Some of them were later described in his novel Femmes (1983), alongside other figures of French intellectualism active before and after May 1968.

His writings and approach to language were examined and praised by French critic Roland Barthes in his book Writer Sollers.

Sollers's other novels include Women (1983), Portrait du joueur (1984), Le coeur absolu (1986), Watteau in Venice (1991), Studio (1997), Passion fixe (2000), and L'étoile des amants (2002), which introduced a degree of realism to his fiction, in that they make more explicit use of plot, character, and thematic development. They offer the reader a fictional study of the society in which he or she lives by reinterpreting, among other things, the roles of politics, media, sex, religion, and the arts.

== Controversies ==
In 1990, following a televised disagreement between Canadian novelist Denise Bombardier and the French writer Gabriel Matzneff over Matzneff's recently published memoir about his sexual relationships with young teenagers, a few days later, on the television channel France 3, Sollers referred to Bombardier as "a badly fucked bitch" (connasse mal-baisée).

== Personal life ==
Sollers married philosopher Julia Kristeva in 1967. He died on 5 May 2023, at the age of 86. For more than fifty years, he also had a relationship with the Belgian novelist Dominique Rolin (1913–2012).

== Bibliography ==
=== Essays ===
- Agent secret, Mercure de France, 2021
- "Complots" – Gallimard, 2016
- "Portraits de femmes" – Flammarion, 2013
- "Fugues" – Gallimard, 2012
- "Discours Parfait" – Gallimard, 2010
- "Vers le Paradis" – Desclée de Brouwer, 2010 (with DVD – a movie "Toward Paradise" by Georgi K. Galabov and Sophie Zhang)
- "Guerres secrètes" – Carnets nord 2007
- "Fleurs" – Hermann éditions 2006
- Dictionnaire amoureux de Venise, 2004
- "Mystérieux Mozart" – Plon 2001
  - "Mysterious Mozart" – University of Illinois Press, 2010
- "Éloge de l'Infini" – Gallimard, 2001
- "Francis Ponge" – Seghers éditions, 2001
- "Francesca Woodman" – Scalo Publishers 1998
- "Casanova l'admirable" – Plon 1998
  - "Casanova the Irresistible" – University of Illinois Press, 2016
- "La Guerre du Goût" – Gallimard, 1994
  - "Liberté du XVIIIème" (Extract from La Guerre du Goût) – Gallimard, 2002
- "Picasso, le héros" – Le cercle d'art 1996
- "Les passions de Francis Bacon" – Gallimard 1996
- "Sade contre l'Être suprême" – Gallimard 1996
- "Improvisations" – Gallimard, 1991
- "De Kooning, vite" – La différence 1988
- "Théorie des Exceptions" – Gallimard, 1985
- "Sur le Matérialisme" – Seuil, 1974
- "L'Écriture et l'Expérience des Limites" – Seuil, 1968
  - Writing and the Experience of Limits – Columbia University Press, 1982
- "Logiques" – Seuil, 1968
- "L'Intermédiaire" – Seuil, 1963
- Le Défi – c.1958 (awarded Fénéon Prize, 1958)

=== Novels ===
- La Deuxième Vie, afterword by Julia Kristeva – Gallimard, 2024
- Graal – Gallimard, 2022
- Légende – Gallimard, 2021
- Désir – Gallimard, 2020
- Le Nouveau – Gallimard, 2019
- Centre – Gallimard, 2018
- Beauté – Gallimard, 2017
- Mouvement – Gallimard, 2016
- L'École du Mystère – Gallimard, 2015
- Médium – Gallimard, 2014
- L'Éclaircie – Gallimard, 2012
- Trésor d'Amour – Gallimard, 2011
- Les Voyageurs du temps – Gallimard, 2009
- Un vrai roman, Mémoires – Plon 2007
- Une Vie Divine – Gallimard, 2006
- L'Étoile des Amants – Gallimard, 2002
- Passion Fixe – Gallimard, 2000
- Un amour américain – Mille et une nuits, 1999
- Studio – Gallimard, 1997
- Le cavalier du Louvre, Vivant Denon – Plon 1995
- Le Secret – Gallimard, 1993
- La Fête à Venise – Gallimard, 1991
  - Watteau in Venice -Scribner's, 1994
- Le Lys d'Or – Gallimard, 1989
- Les Folies Françaises – Gallimard, 1988
- Le Cœur Absolu – Gallimard, 1987
- Paradis 2 – Gallimard, 1986
- Portrait du Joueur – Gallimard, 1984
- Femmes – Gallimard, 1983
  - Women – Columbia UP, 1990
- Paradis – Seuil, 1981
- H – Seuil, 1973
- Lois – Seuil, 1972
- Nombres – Seuil, 1966
- Drame – Seuil, 1965
  - Event – Red Dust, 1987
- Le Parc – Seuil, 1961
  - The Park – Red Dust, 1986
- Une Curieuse Solitude – Seuil, 1958
  - A Strange Solitude – Grove Press, 1959

=== Interviews ===
- Contre-attaque – Grasset, 2016
- L'Évangile de Nietzsche – Cherche Midi, 2006
- Poker (interviews with Ligne de risque)- Gallimard, 2005
- Voir écrire (with Christian de Portzamparc) – Calmann-Levy, 2003
- La Divine Comédie – Desclée de Brouwer, 2000
- Le Rire de Rome – Gallimard, 1992
- Vision à New York – Grasset, 1981
- Entretiens avec Francis Ponge – Seuil, 1970

=== Translations in English ===
- Casanova the Irresistible – University of Illinois Press, 2016
- H – Equus Press, 2015
- Mysterious Mozart – University of Illinois Press, 2010
- Writing and Seeing Architecture (with Christian de Portzamparc) – University Of Minnesota Press, 2008
- Watteau in Venice – Scribner's, 1994
- Women – Columbia University Press, 1990
- Event – Red Dust, 1987
- The Park – Red Dust, 1986
- Writing and the Experience of Limits – Columbia University Press, 1983
- A Strange Solitude – Grove Press, 1959

== Legacy ==
Sollers appears as a character in Philip Roth's Operation Shylock (1993), Michel Houellebecq's novel Atomised (1998) and several novels by Marc-Édouard Nabe, including L'Homme qui arrêta d'écrire (2010). His writings inspired the eponymous Japanese rock band Sollers. A character based on Sollers features in Laurent Binet's 2015 novel La Septième Fonction du langage (Grasset), translated into English as The Seventh Function of Language (2017).

=== Prix Philippe Sollers ===
In 2025, the French author and academic Philippe Forest created the Prix Philippe Sollers to recognize literature that "counters the prevailing gloom, flat thinking, and contemporary nihilism with a vitality of language, sharp-witted thought, and inner freedom.” In other words, the overarching goal of the prize is to "keep alive the intellectual and literary legacy of Philippe Sollers." The works considered by the jury, presided over by Forest, are novels, essays, poetry, and graphic novels. Self-published works are not considered. First selections are announced in September followed by final selections in November. The first award ceremony was held on 27 November 2025 at the Grand Hôtel Cayré in the 7th arrondissement of Paris.

After a turbulent first year, in which several members of the jury resigned, the jury reorganized and changed the venue for the ceremony to the Café Beaubourg in Paris, its walls decorated with pages from Sollers' novel Paradis.

The jury besides Forest includes:

- Frédéric Beigbeder
- Amélie de Bourbon Parme
- Gérard de Cortanze
- Jacques Henric (2025 only)
- Nicolas Idier
- Marc Lambron
- Catherine Millet (2025 only)
- Emmanuel Moses
- Éric Naulleau (2025 only)
- Marcelin Pleynet
- Christian de Portzamparc (architect who designed the Café Beaubourg)
- Sophie Zhang
- Laure Adler
- Marcelin Pleynet (honorary member)
- Arnaud Viviant
- Catherine Cusset (joined 2026)
- Alexandre Duval-Stalla (lawyer and writer)
- Georgi K. Galabov (writer)

The 2025 prize was awarded to two works: Feux sacrés by Cécile Guilbert (Grasset), in the narrative category, and to Les Lois et les Nombres by Romain Graziani (Gallimard), in the essay category.

== Further reading and literary criticism ==
- Roland Barthes, Writer Sollers, 1979 (ISBN 0-485-11337-6)
- Jacques Derrida, Dissemination, 1983 (ISBN 0-226-14334-1)
- Julia Kristeva, Polylogue, 1977 (ISBN 2-02-004631-8)
- Michel Foucault, Distance, aspect, origine : Philippe Sollers, Critique n° 198, November 1963
- Malcolm Charles Pollard, The novels of Philippe Sollers : Narrative and the Visual, 1994 (ISBN 90-5183-707-0)
- Philippe Forest, Philippe Sollers, 1992 (ISBN 2-02-017336-0)
- Eric Hayot, Chinese Dreams: Pound, Brecht, Tel Quel, 2004 (ISBN 0-472-11340-2)
- Hilary Clarke, The Fictional Encyclopaedia: Joyce, Pound, Sollers, 1990 (ISBN 0-8240-0006-4)
- Alex Gordon, ‘Roland Barthes’ Sollers Ēcrivain and the Problem of the Reception of Philippe Sollers’ L’écriture percurrente’, Journal of the Institute of Humanities, Seoul National University, No. 48, February 2002, pp. 55–83.
- Sade's Way, Sollers on Sade, video documentary on ParisLike, 2013 (ISSN 2117-4725)
