= Tel Quel =

Avant-garde literary magazine in France (1960–1982)

- Publisher: Éditions du Seuil
- Founder: Philippe Sollers; Jean-Edern Hallier
- Founded: 1960
- Final issue: 1982
- Country: France
- Based in: Paris
- Language: French

Tel Quel (translated into English as, variously: "as is," "as such," or "unchanged") was a French avant-garde literary magazine published between 1960 and 1982.

== History and profile ==
Tel Quel was founded in 1960 in Paris by Philippe Sollers and Jean-Edern Hallier and published by Éditions du Seuil. Important essays working towards post-structuralism and deconstruction appeared here. Publication ceased in 1982, and the journal was succeeded by L'Infini under Sollers's continued editorship.

Though the journal originally published essays more in line with what current literary theory calls "structuralism," it would eventually feature work that reflected the revaluation of literary, artistic, and music criticism that began in France in the 1960s.

The editors committee included Philippe Sollers, Jean-Edern Hallier, Jean-René Huguenin, Jean Ricardou, Jean Thibaudeau, Michel Deguy, Marcelin Pleynet, Denis Roche, Jean-Louis Baudry, Jean-Pierre Faye, Jacqueline Risset, François Wahl, and Julia Kristeva (married to Philippe Sollers since 1967).

Authors and collaborators include Roland Barthes, Michel Foucault, Maurice Blanchot, Pierre Boulez, Jacques Derrida, Jean Cayrol, Jean-Pierre Faye, and Shoshana Felman.

In 1971 the journal broke with the French Communist Party and declared its support for Maoism. In 1974 the editorial members Philippe Sollers, Marcelin Pleynet, François Wahl, Roland Barthes and Julia Kristeva visited China. The trip, which was tightly organized by Chinese government officials, would later be processed in several essays and books by the participants. In the autumn of 1976 the journal explicitly distanced itself from Maoism.

Tel Quel featured a special section for terrorism in Italy in 1978, and Maria Antonietta Macciocchi and Leonardo Sciascia were among the contributors of the section.
