= Jean-René Huguenin =

French writer (1936–1962)

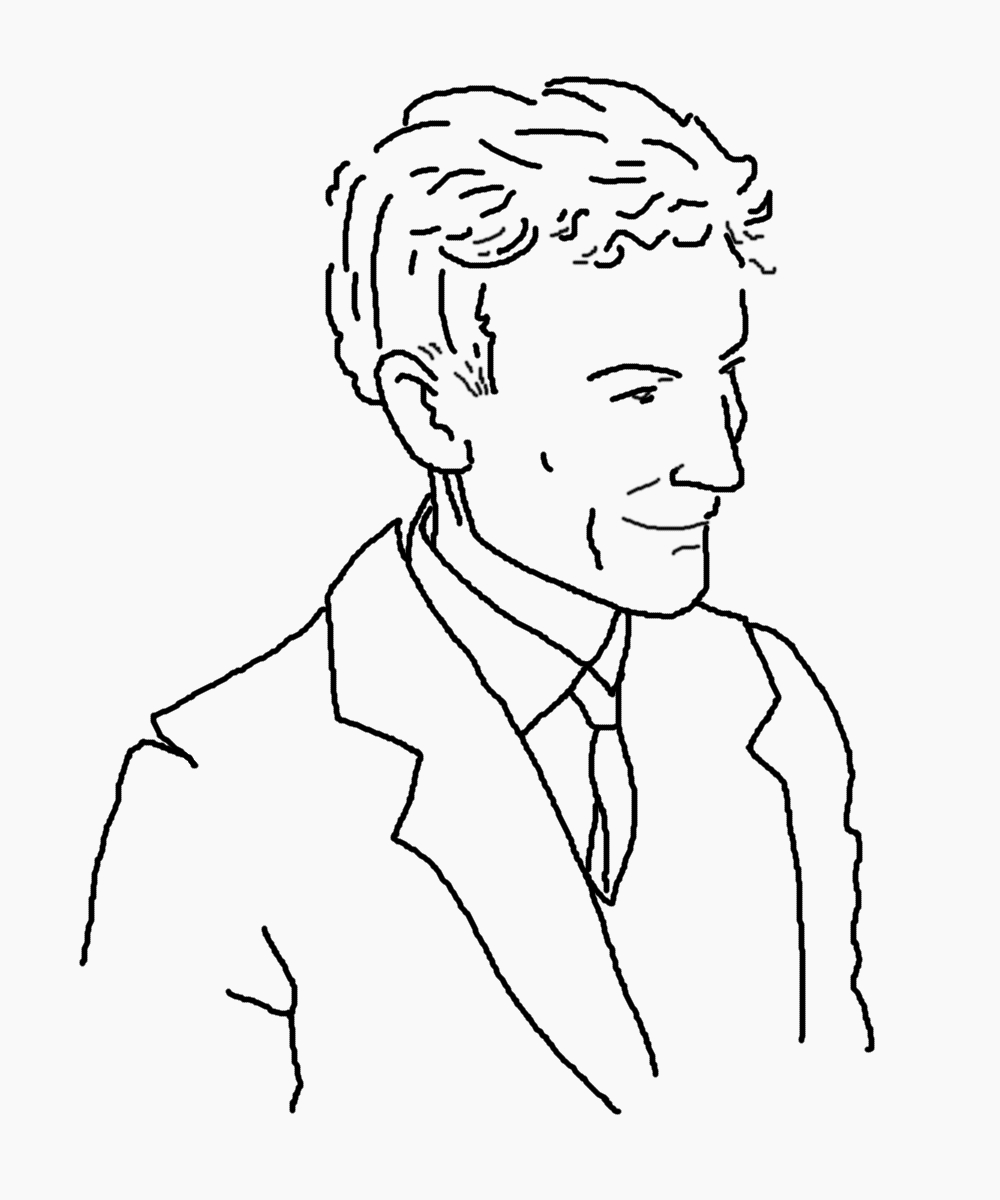
- Sketch of Jean-René Huguenin
- Born: 1 March 1936; Paris, France
- Died: 22 September 1962 (aged 26); Eure-et-Loir, France
- Education: Sciences Po
- Occupations: Novelist, diarist
- Writing career
- Period: 1956-1962

Jean-René Huguenin (1 March 1936 – 22 September 1962) was a French writer. He began writing articles for La Table ronde and Arts at the age of 20. In 1960, he published his first and only novel, La Côte sauvage, which became a critical success and was praised by François Mauriac and Julien Gracq. The book was published in the United States in 1961 as The Other Side of the Summer and the United Kingdom in 1963 as A Place of Shipwreck. On 22 September 1962, Huguenin died in a car accident at the age of 26.

In 2013, a biography on Huguenin by Jérôme Michel was published under the title Un jeune mort d’autrefois – Tombeau de Jean-René Huguenin.

== Bibliography ==
- La Côte sauvage (1960)
  - The Other Side of the Summer (1961), translated by Richard Howard, New York: George Braziller
  - A Place of Shipwreck (1963), translated by Sylvia Townsend Warner, London: Chatto & Windus
- Journal (1955–1962)
- Une autre jeunesse (1965)
- Le Feu à sa vie, unpublished texts and letters collected by Michka Assayas (1987)
- Jean-René Huguenin, Au Signe de la Licorne, (1999), texts by Jean-René Huguenin, Dominique Pradelle, Didier Da Silva
- Les enfants de septembre, Bouquins (2023)
