= Sylvie Kauffmann =

French journalist (born 1955)

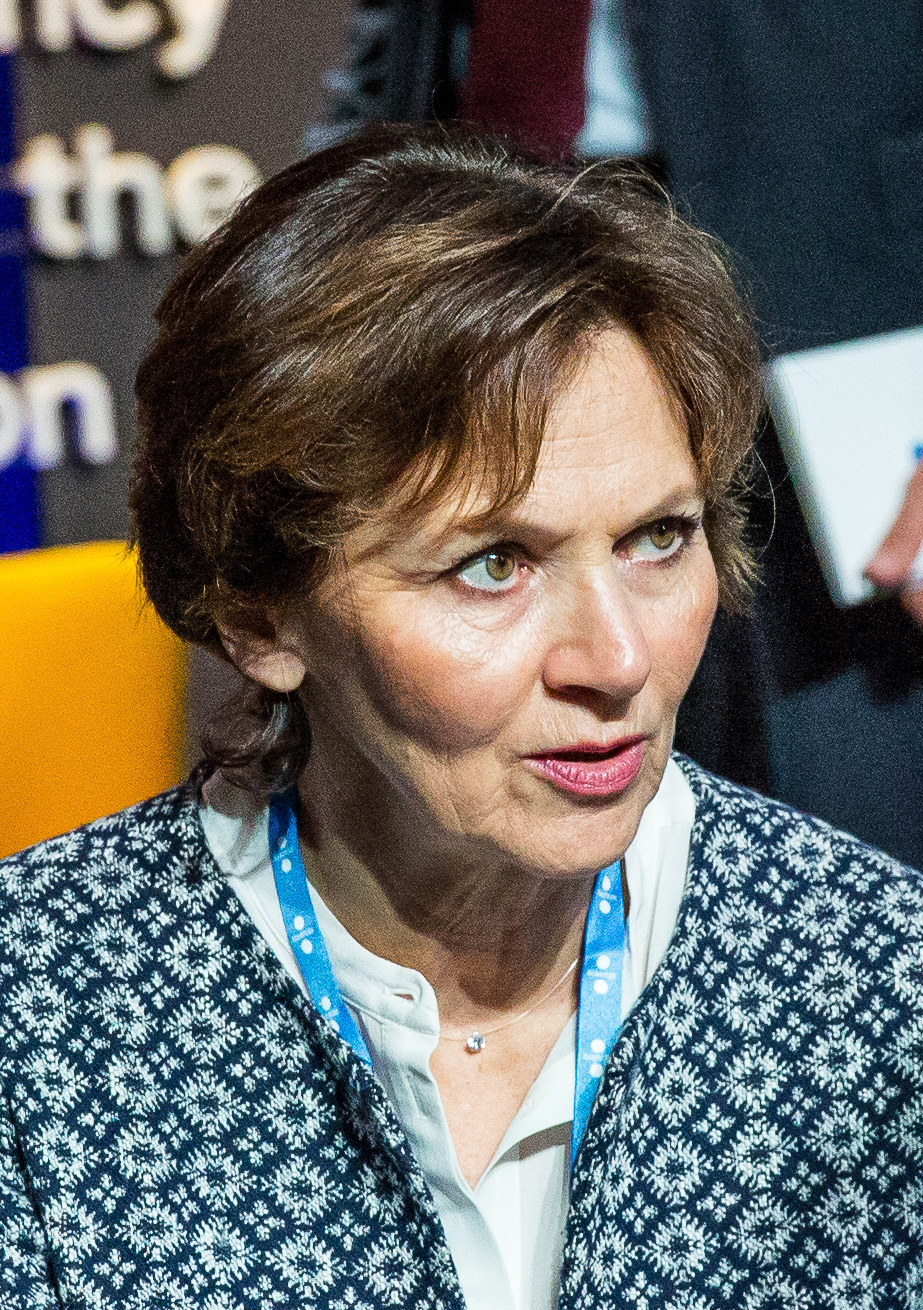
- Kauffmann in 2017
- Born: 30 October 1955 (age 71); Marseille, France
- Occupation: Journalist
- Years active: 1979–present
- Employers: Agence France-Presse (1979–1988); Le Monde (1988–present)
- Spouse: Pierre Buhler

Sylvie Kauffmann (born 30 October 1955) is a French journalist for Agence France-Presse (AFP) and the newspaper Le Monde. She worked for AFP in France in 1979 and as a foreign correspondent from 1980 to 1988. Kauffmann joined Le Monde as Moscow correspondent in 1988 and later Eastern and Central Europe correspondent from 1989 to 1993. She worked in the United States from 1993 to 2001 and Latin America in 2002 and 2003. Kauffman was appointed deputy chief editor of Le Monde in 2003 and covering Southeast Asia as reporter-in-large from 2006 to 2009. In 2010, she was appointed the newspaper's first woman editor-in-chief, serving in the role until 2011.

== Early life and education ==
Kauffmann was born on 30 October 1955 in Marseille, France, to a military doctor. She earned degrees from the Centre de Formation des Journalistes (English: Training Centre for Journalists) in Paris, the Instituts d'études politiques, the Sciences Po Aix, the University of Provence and a degree in Spanish from Bilbao's University of Deusto.

== Career ==
=== AFP, 1979–1988 ===
In 1979, Kauffmann began her career in journalism as the French desk for the French news agency Agence France-Presse (AFP). One year later, she was made a foreign correspondent for the agency, spending 1980 to 1984 in London and 1984 from 1985 in Warsaw, Nouméa in 1985, and then in Moscow between 1986 and 1988, during the period of Glasnost and Perestroika.

=== Le Monde, 1988–present ===
Kauffmann joined Le Monde as its Moscow correspondent in 1988. The following year, she was made Eastern and Central Europe correspondent, covering the Fall of the Berlin Wall, the Dissolution of the Soviet Union, and the political changes of Eastern Europe's new democracies converting to a market economy.

Kauffmann was moved by Le Monde to the United States in 1993, serving as Washington correspondent, until she was made New York Bureau Chief in 1996, serving in the position until 2001. According to The New York Times, Kauffman's "coverage of the United States was considered particularly objective and admirable, given the ambivalent relationship France has often had with the United States", observing the Presidency of Bill Clinton and the emergence of the Internet. In 1998 and 1999, she participated in the French-American Foundation's Young Leaders programme. She returned to Paris in 2001 but was sent back to New York later in the year to cover the Aftermath of the September 11 attacks as reporter-as-large. Kauffman's article collection of the attacks entitled Chronicle of America at War earned her the Prix AFRI-Thucydide international journalism award. From 2002 to 2003, she travelled to Latin America to cover the Argentine financial crisis, the election of Luiz Inácio Lula da Silva as President of Brazil and Hugo Chávez's presidency in Venezuela.

In 2003, Kauffmann returned to Le Monde's Paris headquarters and became part of the editorial team when she was appointed deputy chief editor, becoming responsible for the newspaper's major reporters, and leading its in-depth reporting section. She continued in the role until 2004, when she was made managing editor of the newspaper until 2006. Kauffman was then made correspondent and reporter-at-large for Le Monde based in Singapore, covering Southeast Asia, Burma, the Philippines, China and India with a weekly column.

Éric Fottorino asked her in late 2009 to consider an improved articulation of information for the newspaper and its website. Kauffmann was appointed editor-in-chief of Le Monde by Fottorino on 18 January 2010, succeeding Alain Frachon whose two-year term in the position had ended in 2009 and becoming the first woman to hold the post. During her tenure as executive director, she indicated her desire to improve the print newspaper and website, transforming Le Monde into “the paper that never sleeps.” Kauffmann also oversaw the collaboration of WikiLeaks with El Pais, The Guardian and The New York Times. In 2011, she was one of 13 candidates to apply for the position of director of Le Monde. Although the newspaper staff supported Kauffmann's candidacy, the owners Pierre Bergé, Xavier Niel and Matthieu Pigasse and a selection committee rejected her and appointed Érik Izraelewicz as director of Le Monde.

Kauffmann left the post of editor-in-chief soon after, but remained at Le Monde as an editor. Kauffmann contributes to the opinion pages of The New York Times International Edition, the Financial Times, and regularly appears on the France Culture radio programme L'Esprit public.

== Other activities ==
=== Corporate boards ===
- Google, Member of the Advisory Council

=== Non-profit organizations ===
- Paris School of International Affairs (PSIA), Member of the Strategic Committee
- Reuters Institute for the Study of Journalism, Member of the Advisory Board
- AFP Foundation, Member of the Board
- European Council on Foreign Relations (ECFR), Member of the Council
- European Press Prize, Member of the Panel of Judges
- Transatlantic Leadership Network, Member of the Council of Advisors
- Trilateral Commission, Member of the European Group

== Personal life ==
Kauffmann is married to the ambassador Pierre Buhler.
