= André Fontaine =

French journalist and historian (1921–2013)

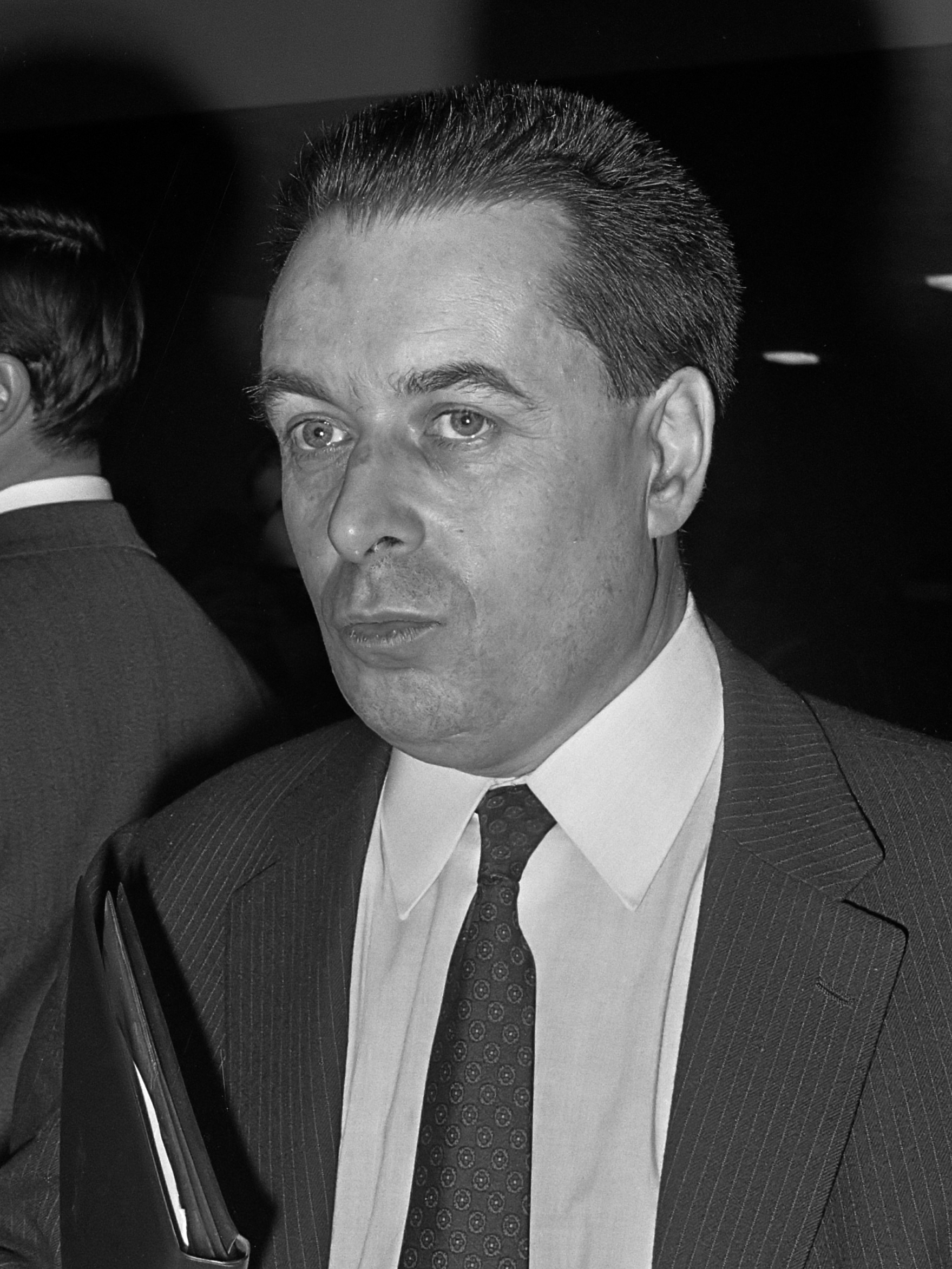
- André Fontaine (1969)
- Born: 30 March 1921; Paris, France
- Died: 17 March 2013 (aged 91); Paris, France
- Occupations: Historian and journalist

André Fontaine (Paris, France; 30 March 1921 – ibidem, 17 March 2013) was a French historian and journalist. He started working at Temps Présent, and then was director at Le Monde in 1947, at the official beginning of the Cold War. He became the newspaper's editor from 1969 to 1985, and director from 1985 to 1991. As of February 2007 he was still contributing articles to the paper. André Fontaine is famous for his historical thesis, according to which the Cold War in fact started as soon as 1917 with the cordon sanitaire policy.

Fontaine died in Paris on 17 March 2013, aged 91.

== Biography ==
His father Georges Fontaine, a sales clerk, was awarded the Croix de guerre 1914–1918 (France).

André Fontaine graduated from the Society of Mary (Marianists) Lycée Fénelon Sainte-Marie de Monceau with a licentiate in literature, and advanced degrees in public law and political economy. He writes short stories while convalescing from measles. In July 1942, he submitted them to the Catholic weekly Temps présent, which was renamed Positions during the Occupation. The latter published them and, in the process, hired him as the weekly's editorial secretary, as well as brochures and small books, such as those in the “Ici la France” and “Fête et saisons” collections, co-published with Éditions du Cerf in July 1942. It was in this position that Hubert Beuve-Méry spotted him, making him one of his four “musketeers” along with Jacques Fauvet, Pierre Viansson-Ponté and Bernard Lauzanne.

== Bibliography ==
- L'Alliance atlantique à l'heure du dégel, Calmann-Lévy, 1960
- Histoire de la Guerre froide in two volumes (De la révolution d'octobre à la guerre de Corée and De la guerre de Corée à la crise des alliances), 1965 et 1966, Fayard
- La Guerre civile froide, 1969, Fayard
- Le Dernier Quart du siècle, 1976, Fayard
- La France au bois dormant, 1978, Fayard
- Histoire de la détente (Un seul lit pour deux rêves), 1981, Fayard
- Sortir de l'hexagonie, Stock 1984
- L'un sans l'autre, 1991, Fayard
- Après eux le déluge, de Kaboul à Sarajevo, 1995, La Martinière
- La Tache rouge, le roman de la Guerre froide, 2004, La Martinière; re-edited with augmented chronology, Le Seuil, « Points »-histoire, 2006

== Honours and awards ==
- Chevalier of the Order of the Crown (Belgium)
- Chevalier of the Order of the Dannebrog
- Officier of the Order of the Lion of Finland
- Officier of the Order of Leopold
- Officier of the Order of Vasa
- Commandeur of the Order of Merit of the Federal Republic of Germany
- Commandeur of the Order of Merit of the Italian Republic
- Commandeur of the Order of the Phoenix (Greece)
