= Claude Julien (journalist) =

French journalist

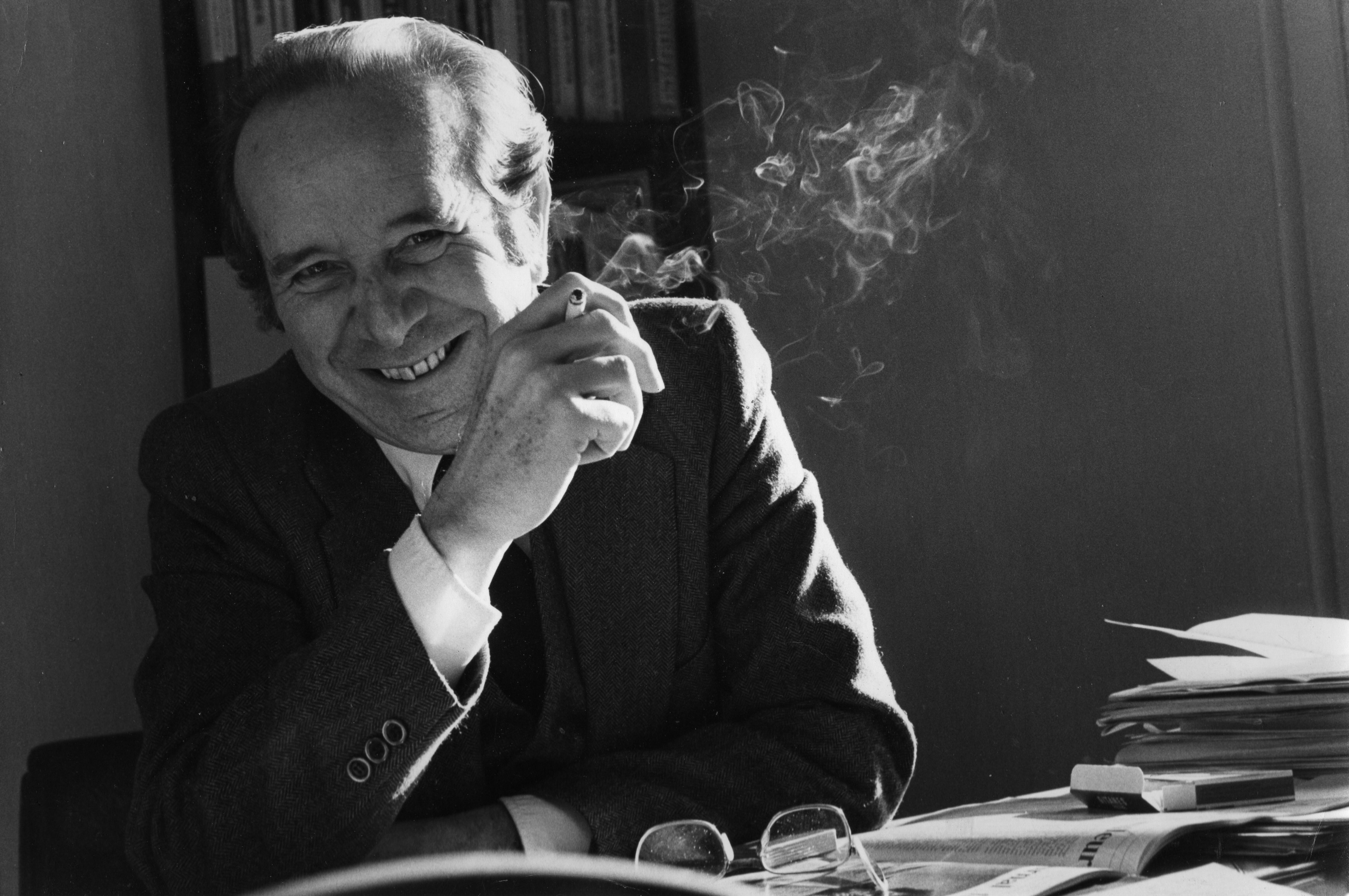
- Claude Julien in Paris, 1979
- Born: 17 May 1925; Saint-Rome-de-Cernon, Aveyron, France
- Died: 5 May 2005; Sauveterre-la-Lémance, Lot-et-Garonne, France
- Occupations: Journalist, director of Le Monde diplomatique
- Writing career
- Notable works: America’s Empire, Suicide of the democracies

Claude Julien (17 May 1925, Saint-Rome-de-Cernon (Aveyron, France) – 5 May 2005, Sauveterre-la-Lémance (Lot-et-Garonne, France)) was a French journalist. He joins the foreign department of French newspaper of record Le Monde in 1951. In 1973, he became editor-in-chief then director of Le Monde diplomatique.

== Biography ==
Of modest origins, Claude Julien was born in a large family in Saint-Rome de Cernon. His father was a railroad station manager and he was the ninth of thirteen children. He passes the Certificat d'études primaires in June 1937 and then the French National diploma in June 1940.

He was a militant for the French Young Christian Students (YCS) from 1937 and then for the Young Christian Workers. In 1942, during World War II, the YCS hires him to work in Lyon, where is the administration center for the Zone libre. He quickly follows to join the Resistance. At the time of the Liberation, in September 1944, with the assistance of officer Pierre Dunoyer de Segonzac, he founded the newspaper Debout (Standing Up or On Our Feet) in Castres, in accordance with the motto of the city.

In December 1946, the YCS sends him to the USA for a period of 20 months to help develop the movement in that country. He simultaneously takes courses in political science at the University of Notre Dame in Indiana (USA). "He then discovers the land of contrasts, of poverty and wealth, of white and black people, of social struggles and of consumerism."

Back in France, he became a journalist for the magazine La Vie (1949–1950) and also works for Présence Africaine. He then becomes the editor-in-chief of La Dépêche marocaine in Tangier (October 1950 – March 1951). He joined the foreign service of Le Monde in 1951.

In January 1960, he publishes the first volume of his book Le nouveau Nouveau Monde (The new New World), "which constitutes an in-depth analysis of the contemporary US". The second volume is published in April 1960.

He writes La Révolution Cubaine (The Cuban Revolution) in 1961, which becomes the first book published in France dealing with this major event of Latin America's contemporary history.

Reacting against a common preconception, he publishes the stand out book L'Empire Américain (America's Empire) in 1968, which will receive the French literary award of the Prix Aujourd'hui. The book argues that, despite the USA not possessing colonies, they do, regardless, constitute an "Empire without borders". "It is nowadays the most powerful that history has ever known, by its manufacturing capacity (with 6% of the world's population, the USA account for 43% of the non-communist world's production), by its military power, by its catching dynamism and by the extension of its influence." The book will be updated in 1973 for the occasion of its republication in a Pocket edition. Very well documented, the book will remain for a long time as "the indispensable instrument to the understanding of contemporary international politics".

In 1969, he is appointed at the direction of Le Monde's foreign department.

In January 1973, he succeeds François Honti as the director of Le Monde diplomatique (meaning "The Diplomatic World" in French), of which he will considerably increase the circulation and readership. "Claude Julien transforms Le Monde Diplomatique into a more incisive organism, offering to more numerous readers meticulous analyses of the major international, social, economic and cultural issues. He modifies the layout, increases the pagination, widens the thematics and fully acknowledges the Third World". Under his direction, until 1990, the circulation of the newspaper will increase from 50.000 to 150.000 copies.

On the occasion of the American Revolution's bicentenary, he publishes Le Rêve et l'Histoire (The Dream of History, or, Two-hundred years of American history) and proceeds to be invited in the television talk-show Apostrophes March 19th of 1976.

In June 1980, the Society of Editors of the newspaper Le Monde elects four candidates, of which Claude Julien, to succeed director Jacques Fauvet. It was the first and last time this method of appointment was tried. At the term of a long process, Claude Julien is elected manager of the newspaper in April 1981. "Preaching economic austerity as much as editorial strictness, Claude Julien displeases a staff used to more generosity and flexibility." The 11th of January 1982, the Society of Editors holds a vote of no confidence in his regard. He immediately resigns from his post of administrative director and then of manager, in May, after a new candidate, André Laurens, has been nominated. Claude Julien then fully dedicates himself again to Le Monde Diplomatique.

After he retires in 1990, he involves himself in a number of secular organizations, focused on education, nonviolence, peace and culture.

== Bibliography ==
Specialist of North America, Claude Julien has published, in french, the following books:

- Puissance et faiblesses des syndicats américains, Le Monde monograph, 1955.
- L'Amérique en révolution, in collaboration with Jacqueline Julien, Bibliothèque de l'homme d'action, 1956.
- Cuba ou la ferveur contagieuse, Le Monde monograph, 1960.
- Le nouveau Nouveau Monde, Julliard, 1960.
- Sermons noirs, translation of God's Trombones by James Weldon Johnson, Le club du livre chrétien, 1960.
- La Révolution cubaine, Julliard, 1961.
- Le Canada, dernière chance de l'Europe, Grasset, 1965.
- L'Empire américain, Grasset, 1968, awarded by french Aujourd'hui prize.
- Le Suicide des démocraties, Grasset, Paris, 1972.
- L'Empire américain, second edition, revised and updated, Le Livre de Poche, 1973.
- Le Rêve et l'Histoire. Deux siècles d'Amérique, Grasset, 1976.
- Le devoir d'irrespect, Moreau, 1979.
- 1959, Castro prend le pouvoir, Seuil, Les événements dans Le Monde, presented by Marcel Niedergang, 1999
- Le devoir d'irrespect, second edition, HB, 2007.

=== English Translation ===
- L'Empire américain:
  - United States of America: America’s Empire, two editions :
    - Pantheon Books, translated by Renaud Bruce, 1971, ISBN 9780394414812.
    - Vintage Books, translated by Renaud Bruce, 1973.
- Le suicide des démocraties:
  - United Kingdom: Suicide of the democracies, Calder & Boyars, translated by J. A. Underwood, 1975, ISBN 9780714510613.

=== Others Translations ===
- Le nouveau Nouveau Monde:
  - Spain: El nuevo Nuevo Mundo, Cid Madrid, translated by E. Jarnes Bergua, 1960.
- Le Canada, dernière chance de l'Europe:
  - Canada: Canada : Europe's last chance, Macmillan, translated by Penny William, 1968.
- L'Empire américain:
  - Brasil: O Império americano, Civilização brasileira, translated by Fernando de Castro Ferro, 1970.
  - Canada: L'Empire américain, Institut Nazareth et Louis-Braille, edited in braille, 1970.
  - Chine: Mei li jian di guo, Wenton, translated by Yun Noiannian, 1971.
  - Cuba: El Impero norte americano, Ciencias Sociales del Instituto del libro, translated by Francisco Masvidal, 1970.
  - Denmark: Det amerikanske imperium, Gyldendals Logboger, translated by Jens Juhl Jensen, 1971, ISBN 9788700156722.
  - Finland: Imperium Kasvot, Otava, translated by Kalle Salo, 1970.
  - Germany: Das amerikanische imperium, Ullstein, translated by Edwin Ortmann, 1969.
  - Italy: L’impero americano, Il Saggiatore di Alberto Mondadori, translated by Furio Belfiore and Rosalba Buccianti, 1969.
  - Japan: Amerika towa nani ka : kokkyō naki teikoku no jisshōteki kenkyū, Saimaru Shuppankai, translated by Takashi Oi and Akiyoshi Hoshino, 1970.
  - Lebanon: L'Empire américain, Dar Al Hakika, translated by Naji Abou Khalil and Docteur Fouad Chahin, 1970.
  - Netherlands: Het Amerikaanse imperialisme, Wolters-Noordhoff, translated by B.V.A. Röling, 1969.
  - Poland: Imperium amerykanskie, Ksiazka i wiedza, translated by Stefan Meller, 1971.
  - Slovenia: Ameriski imperij, Drzavna Zalozba Slovenije, translated by Marjan Poljanec, 1974.
  - Spain: El imperio americano, Grijalbo, translated by Esteban Riambau, 1969.
  - Sweden: Det amerikanska imperiet, Bonniers, translated by Katarina Beskow, 1969.
  - Turkey: Amerikan imparatorlugu, Hitit Yayinlari, translated by Tahsin Saraç and Aysel Gülercan, 1969.
- Le suicide des démocraties:
  - Argentina: El suicido de las democracias, Extemporaneos, translated by Hugo Martinez Moctezuma, 1975.
  - Brasil: O suicidio das democracias, Artenova, translated by Marina Colasanti, 1975.
  - Greece: αυτοκτονία των δημοκρατιών, Aakaio, translated by A. I. Aibeph, 1974.
  - Italy: Il suicidio delle democrazie, Il Saggiatore, translated by Marisa Calimodio, 1973.
  - Japan: Kuzureyuku minshu kokka, Saimaru Shuppankai, translated by Tsuneo Amano, 1975.
  - Poland: Samobojstwo demokracji, Ksiazka i wiedza, translated by Janina Perlin, 1974.
  - Portugal: O suicidio das democracias, Arcadia, translated by Manuel Martins Costa, 1974.
  - Spain: El suicidio de las democracias, two editions :
    - Nova terra, translated by Ana Gonzalez and Miguel Elena Rosello, 1974, ISBN 9788428008112.
    - Hogar del libro, translated by Ana Gonzalez and Miguel Elena, 1985, ISBN 9788472792036.
  - Turkey: Demokrasilerin intihari, Milliyet Yayinlari, translated by Mehmet A. Kayabal, 1974.
- Le Rêve et l’Histoire:
  - Portugal: O Sonho e a Historia, Arcadia, translated by Rafael Gomes Filipe and Francisco Agarez, 1976.
  - Syria: لحلم والتاريخ: مئتا عام من تاريخ أمريكا , Dar Tlass, translated by Nakhla Class, 1976.
