= CNews (newspaper) =

French newspaper

- Type: Free daily newspaper
- Format: demi-berliner
- Owner(s): Bolloré médias Société éditrice du Monde
- Publisher: MatinPlus SA
- President: Ludovic Pompignoli (Publication Director)
- Editor-in-chief: Thomas Liard
- Founded: 6 February 2007; 19 years ago
- Language: French
- City: Paris, Lyon, Bordeaux, Lille, Marseille, Nantes, Toulouse
- Country: France
- Website: cnews.fr

CNews is a free French daily newspaper. Launched in Île-de-France on 6 February 2007, it was also known as MatinPlus (before 2008), Direct Matin Plus (from 2008 to 2010), Direct Matin (from 2010 to 2017), CNews Matin (in 2017), and CNews (after 4 December 2017, with the same name as the television news channel CNews owned by Canal+). It is owned by Bolloré, principally held by Vincent Bolloré.

The morning paper competes with 20 minutes, a free newspaper distributed in the morning in Île-de-France. Its distribution includes 500,000 copies in Île-de-France and more than 900,000 in France. From 2006 to 2010, the free newspaper Direct Soir - also owned by the Bolloré group - was distributed in the evening. MatinPlus is jointly published by the media groups La Vie-Le Monde (Le Monde) and Bolloré (Havas, and Direct 8 until 2011) through their subsidiaries Bolloré médias and Sofiprom. The MatinPlus SA group is held by the Bolloré group (70%) and Le Monde owns 30% with the possibility to own up to 50%.

It is the Paris bridgehead of the newsgroup VillePlus in association with La Dépêche du Midi, Le Progrès, La Provence, Sud Ouest and La Voix du Nord. They offer free daily newspapers in Montpellier (CNews Montpellier Plus), Lyon (CNews Lyon Plus), Marseille (CNews Provence), Bordeaux (CNews Bordeaux) and Lille (CNews Lille). CNews is also distributed in Nantes (CNews Grand Ouest), Toulouse (CNews Toulouse), Nice (CNews Côte d'Azur) and Strasbourg (CNews Strasbourg), in a version similar to the one distributed in Paris. It is published in the demi-berliner format, which allows for easy transportation - an important consideration since it is distributed in areas with public transportation.

== History ==
In November 2006, François Bonnet, editor in chief of La Vie-Le Monde, responsible for Paris Plus, announced to the Agence France-Presse that he was resigning from the new free newspaper because of editorial disagreements:

Je quitte le groupe Le Monde parce que je suis en désaccord total avec ce qui s'avère in fine être un projet Bolloré et non plus un projet Bolloré/Le Monde. Il s'est avéré assez rapidement que Vincent Bolloré avait son propre projet élaboré avec Jacques Séguéla - I quit Le Monde because what I thought was a Bolloré/LeMonde project is actually a Bolloré project. Quickly it became apparent that Vincent Bolloré had developed the paper with Jacques Séguéla.

— Le Monde

François Bonnet indicated that the free paper was transformed into a kind of press paper where the content was not as important as the advertising space. The question of "l'enjeu de l'information" - "the challenge of information" or, content versus advertising space, was rapidly coming to the surface in the history of the young newspaper. In the first instance, on 25 May 2008, Bolloré Média decided to censor an article from Courrier International. The article was critical of the French police, and went against the neutrality of the newspaper, according to Jean-Christophe Thiéry, president of Bolloré-Média.

In January 2009, an article that was a collaboration with Le Monde was censored. The article, written by Eric Nunès, exposed a marketing strategy that RATP used to collect digital data from users when users purchased a Navigo card. The article was associated with Direct Matin affairs. Direct Martin had a commercial contract with RATP concerning distribution of the newspaper in metro stations. In addition, a subsidiary of Bolloré (IER) specializes in the transportation, access control, and RFID technology used by RATP for the Navigo cards. IER was a client of RATP.

Two free newspapers, Direct Matin Plus and Direct Soir, were in the red in 2007 (40 million euros) and in 2008 (estimated 25 million euros). Direct Soir has not appeared since December 2010. In January 2012, Bolloré announced the end of the partnership with Le Monde and Courrier International in Direct Martin. Le Monde retains its 30% holdings in MatinPlus SA.

On 27 February 2017, following the change of iTELE to CNews, Direct Matin became CNews Matin. On 4 December 2017, CNews Matin becomes CNews in issue number 2,772, adopting the logo and the graphic of the television channel CNews.

== Visual identity (logo) ==
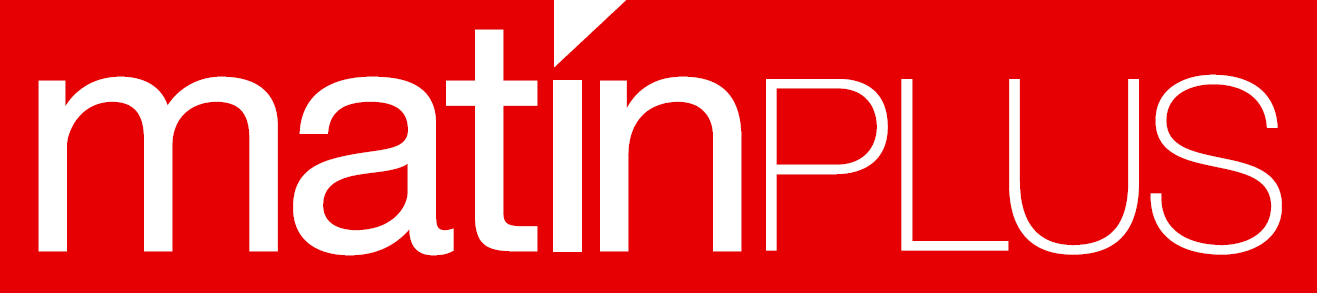
Old logo of Matin Plus from 6 February 2007 to 11 January 2008

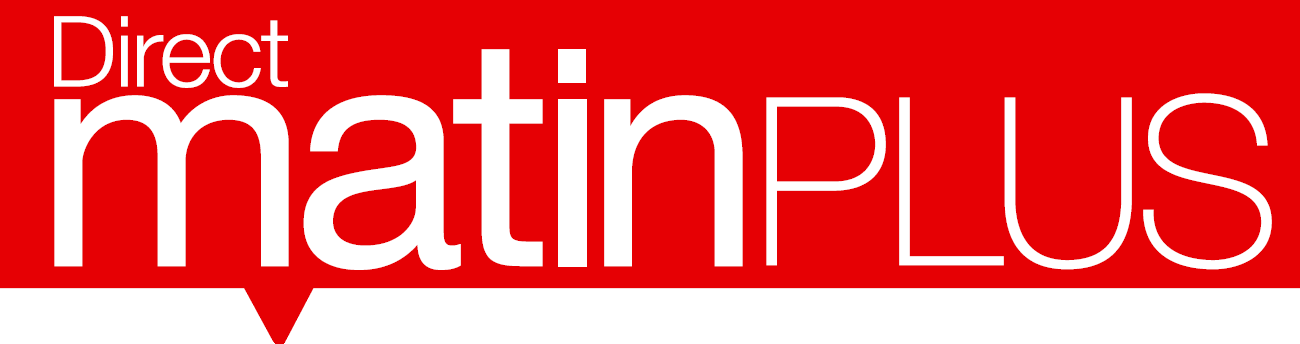
Old logo of Direct Matin Plus from 14 January 2008 to 25 January 2008

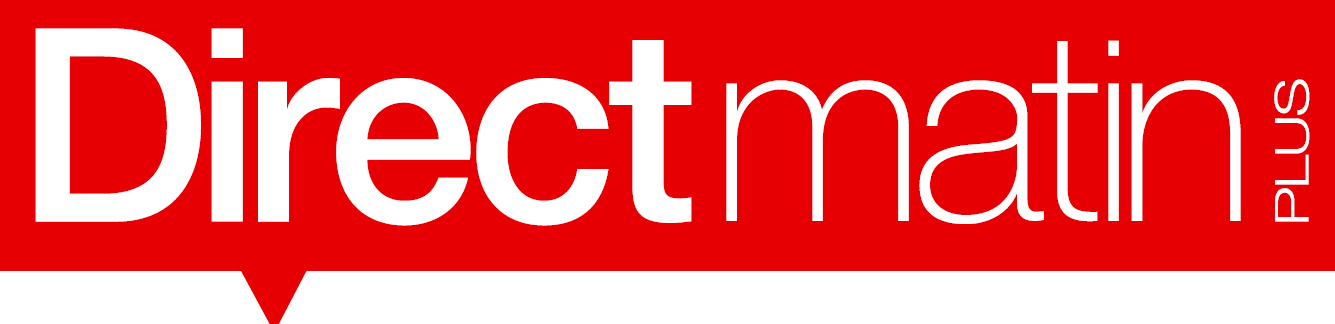
Old logo of Direct Matin Plus from 28 January 2008 to 21 May 2010

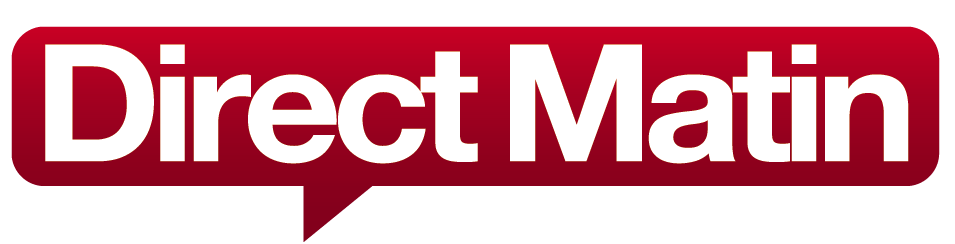
Old logo of Direct Matin from 25 May 2010 to 24 February 2017

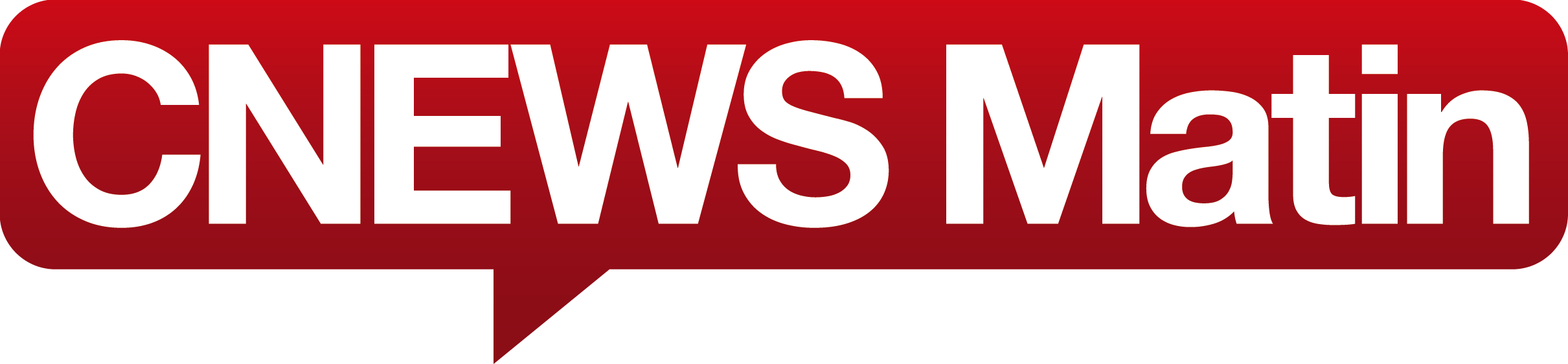
Old logo of CNews Matin from 27 February 2017 to 1 December 2017.

== Editorial content ==
The paper is composed of between 28 and 32 pages, depending upon the amount of advertisements. The content in MatinPlus has color photographs with captions and articles written by journalists. The paper is divided into sections including sections for World news, news within France, Sports, a puzzle section, a television programming section, and a section about cuisine. Initially and up to the year 2012, a section covering four pages of articles were included from Le Monde, and an article was also included from Courrier International each day. The influence of Vincent Bolloré's editing of CNews is very present: One is validated almost daily, according to a statement from one employee in the France section of the paper. The billionaire says the same thing, "Dans mes médias, j’ai le 'final cut' " - "In my companies, I have the final cut". Serge Nedjar, assistant to Vincent Bolloré and general director of the newspaper, chooses some of the topics to be written about, other topics are ignored.

France Info has reported that under the direction of Serge Nedjar, Direct Matin is very concerned not to displease politicians, regardless of their political party. There is an environment which discourages making waves. An ex-employee quoted from France Info said that Nejar is very "Sarkoziest" and that this was obvious when Sarkozy was in power. Even so, the ex-employee said, one cannot criticize François Hollande. Critical articles about Ségolène Royal and Arnaud Montebourg were also forbidden. It was not difficult to remove journalists according to an ex-employee - there were always young journalists and CDDs in the newsroom so it was easy not to renew someone at the end of the year. As soon as a journalist created opposition, that person would leave.

== Newsroom ==
The newsroom has its own writing staff. The main articles are written by 20 journalists. The articles are organized into different sections:

- local news
- French news
- World news
- Sports
- Culture
- Television, film, internet

The editing team of Direct Matin is composed of journalists whose focus is mostly on only this role. Cover articles of larger size are provided by journalists from Matin Plus. The Matin Plus team works in the Bolloré tower at Puteaux. These cover articles could be extended, with a project of paid newspaper "quality" announced by Vincent Bolloré in 2009 and 2010.

The newspaper can also be downloaded directly from its website as a PDF document. Since April 2012, a web-based version has been accessible. Directmatin.fr, which became CNewsmatin.fr, is available with a different version than the paper version.

== Controversy ==
According to journalist Thomas Deltombe, Direct Soir and Matin Plus were used by the Bolloré group to promote their contracts in Africa:

C’est ainsi que Matin plus, quotidien réalisé en partenariat avec Le Monde, dresse un bilan flatteur des vingt-cinq années de règne du chef de l’État camerounais Paul Biya. Le gouvernement de Yaoundé, apprend-on avec surprise, se démène pour « revaloriser le pouvoir d’achat » des Camerounais et « renforcer les institutions de promotion des droits de l’homme» (Matin plus, 26 October 2007). Le « gratuit » ne rectifiera pas son discours en février 2008 lorsque les émeutes de la faim seront écrasées dans le sang, faisant une centaine de morts. - It is the case that Matin Plus, the daily free newspaper published in association with Le Monde, draws a flattering assessment of the 25-year reign of Cameroonian head-of-state Paul Biya. The government of Yaoundé, we are surprised to learn, is calling for "improvements in the purchasing power" of Cameroonians and is also calling for a "strengthening of institutions responsible for developing human rights." (Matin plus, 26 October 2007). The "free daily" newspaper did not correct its discussion of the February 2008 Cameroonian hunger riots, which were crushed by the government and resulted in 100 deaths.

== See also ==
- 20 minutes
- Metro
