= Fenoglio =

Fenoglio may refer to:

== People with the surname ==
- Beppe Fenoglio, an Italian writer
- Jérôme Fenoglio (born 1965), French journalist
- Pietro Fenoglio (1865–1927), Italian architect and engineer
- Virgilio Fenoglio, Argentinian chessmaster

== Other ==
- ?, a fictional character in the Inkworld trilogy by Cornelia Funke
