= Le Monde mensuel =

News magazine in France (2010–2014)

- Categories: News magazine
- Frequency: Monthly
- Founded: 2010
- First issue: 4 February 2010
- Final issue: 2014
- Company: Le Monde SA
- Country: France
- Based in: Paris
- Language: French

Le Monde mensuel was a French language monthly news magazine published in Paris, France, from 2010 to 2014. It mostly covered selected articles from Le Monde published in the preceding month.

== History and profile ==
Le Monde mensuel was first published on 4 February 2010. It was a monthly news magazine published on the first Thursday of each month. The publisher of the monthly was Le Monde SA and the magazine had its headquarters in Paris. In addition to the articles of Le Monde, the 120-page monthly also included a detailed analysis of news.

The editorial team of Le Monde mensuel was led by Jerome Gauthere. The magazine ceased publication in 2014.
