= Le Monde =

French daily newspaper founded in 1944

- Logo of Le Monde

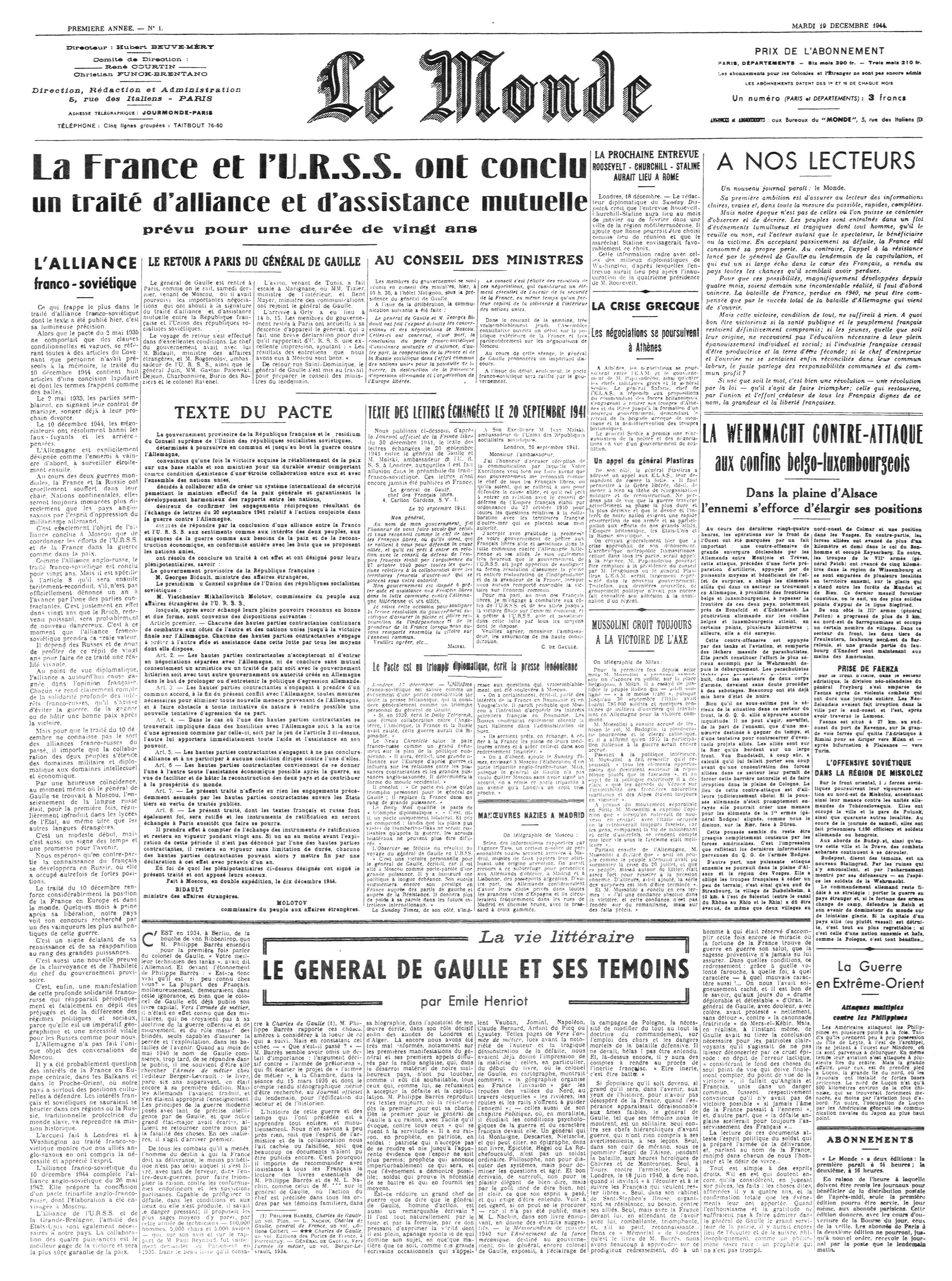
- Front page on the Franco-Soviet Treaty of Alliance from the first issue of Le Monde, 19 December 1944
- Type: Daily newspaper
- Format: Berliner
- Owner: Groupe Le Monde
- Founder: Hubert Beuve-Méry
- Publisher: Société éditrice du Monde
- Editor: Louis Dreyfus, Jérôme Fenoglio
- Founded: 19 December 1944
- Language: French; English (digital edition, since April 2022)
- Headquarters: Paris, France
- Circulation: 479,243 (as of 2022)
- Price: €3.80 (Sunday–Monday through Friday issues), €5.50 (Saturday issue)
- ISSN: 0395-2037 (print); 1950-6244 (web)
- OCLC number: 833476932
- Website: lemonde.fr

Le Monde (French: [l(ə) mɔ̃d]; lit. 'The World') is a French newspaper founded in 1944 by Hubert Beuve-Méry. It is the most widely read paid national daily newspaper in France, with 2.44 million readers in 2021, and the most widely circulated, with around 500,000 subscribers, including 414,000 digital subscribers and 87,000 print subscribers.

It presents itself as a "newspaper of record". Former editor Éric Fottorino preferred not to describe the newspaper as a "newspaper of record", stating instead that it was "not just any newspaper", but rather one that "claims to become the reference, an alloy of competence and editorial independence built over several decades". It is nevertheless widely regarded as such, including internationally.

Le Monde is the last French daily traditionally described as an "evening paper". It is published in Paris in the early afternoon with the following day's date, and later in some major cities, before being distributed elsewhere the next morning.

According to Radio France, Le Monde has adopted successive editorial lines since its founding, generally located, albeit reductively, on the centre-left. A 2010 academic work also characterises its editorial stance as centre-left. In April 2022, an Ifop survey indicated that among regular readers of Le Monde, 48% voted for left-wing candidates in the first round of the 2012 presidential election, and 27% voted for Emmanuel Macron.

Le Monde is owned by Groupe Le Monde. Its shareholding structure includes the holding company Le Monde libre, notably owned by Xavier Niel, and the Independence Pole, held by employees, trade unions, and associations.

== History ==
=== 1944–1968: Foundation and establishment as a newspaper of record ===
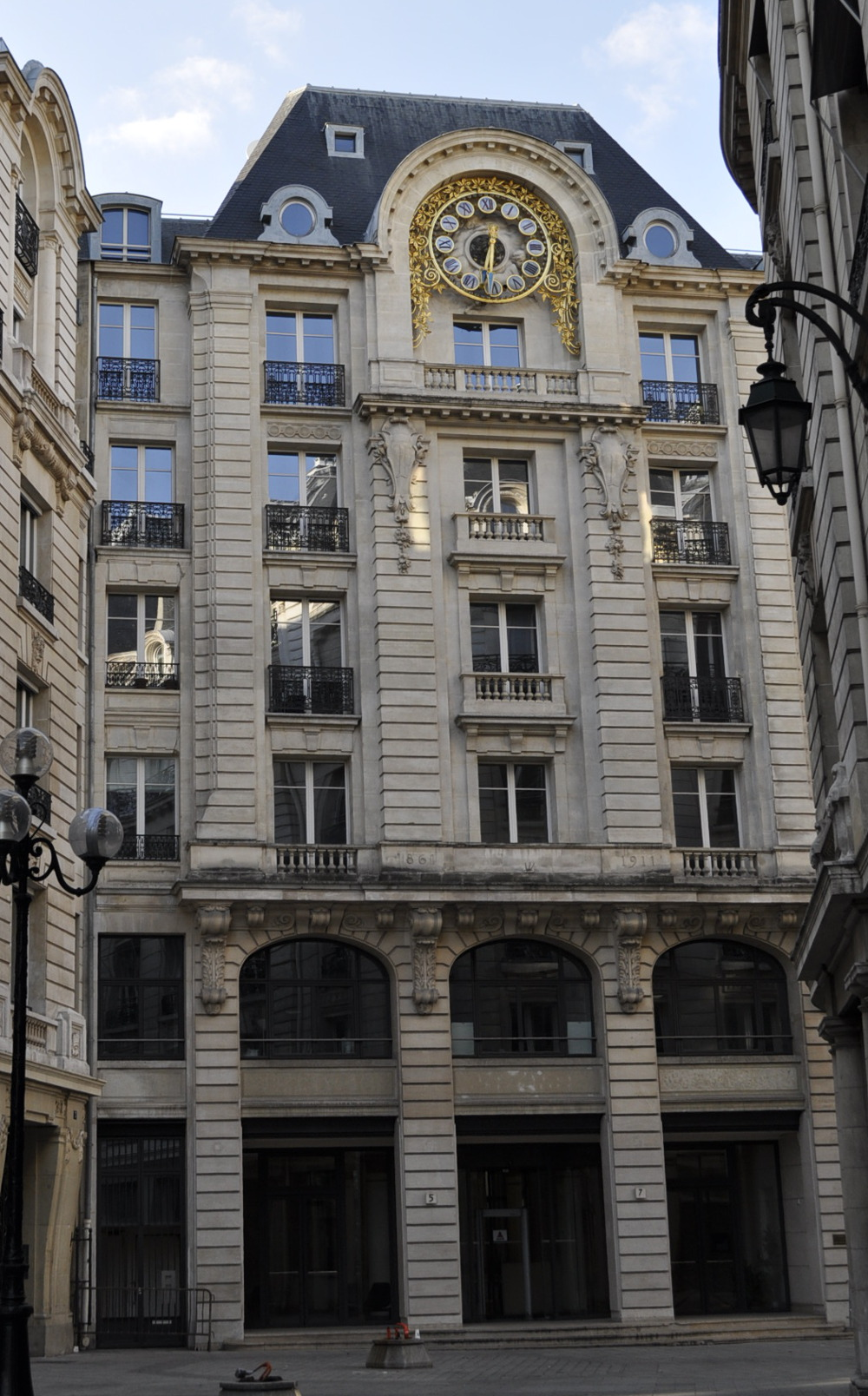
The editorial offices of Le Monde were located at 5, Rue des Italiens, Paris, from its creation until 1989 (photograph taken in 2015).

The first issue of Le Monde was published on 18 December 1944, dated 19 December 1944, and consisted of a single double-sided page. It succeeded the newspaper Le Temps, which had been shut down under the Ordinances of 1944 on the press targeting publications that appeared during the German occupation of France during World War II. The premises of Le Temps were requisitioned and its equipment seized. Le Monde, as beneficiary of this confiscation, adopted its format and layout, took over much of its editorial staff, workers, and employees, as well as its former offices on Rue des Italiens, where it would remain for 44 years. This location earned it the nickname "the Rue des Italiens daily".

General de Gaulle, who wished to provide France with a "prestige newspaper" oriented toward international affairs and serving as an unofficial voice of the Republic, was a driving force behind its creation. He tasked his Minister of Information, Pierre-Henri Teitgen, with finding a director, a difficult task since many press figures of the time had either collaborated during the occupation or were already leading newspapers of the clandestine press. Georges Bidault, president of the National Council of the Resistance, suggested Hubert Beuve-Méry. Beuve-Méry hesitated for a long time, as he sought to run a newspaper independent of political, economic, and religious powers.

On 11 December 1944, Hubert Beuve-Méry founded the limited liability company (SARL) Le Monde with capital of 200,000 francs divided into 200 shares. Its first editorial committee also included René Courtin, a professor of law, and Christian Funck-Brentano, formerly responsible for press matters in General de Gaulle's cabinet. Like Le Temps, the daily was intended for elites, and reached a circulation of 150,000 copies as early as 1945. Born in the shadow of political power, Le Monde gradually emancipated itself under Beuve-Méry, who secured its editorial independence during the Cold War and the First Indochina War.

Employees have played a central role in the management of the newspaper. In 1951, the Le Monde Journalists' Society was created to safeguard the paper's editorial independence. It was initially allocated just over 28% of the shares of SARL Le Monde. (This was followed by companies representing employees and managers in 1968, and readers in 1985.) In 1956, Le Monde became the owner of its building at 5 Rue des Italiens. From the early 1960s onward, its circulation expanded rapidly, tripling over 20 years, from 137,433 copies in 1960 to 347,783 in 1971, and nearly 500,000 by the late 1970s.

This financial and editorial independence was also political. The newspaper became a meeting point for several major currents of thought, primarily linked to Christian democracy in domestic affairs and to moderate anti-colonialism in foreign policy.

These positions generated debate. In addition to tensions with de Gaulle, Jean-Jacques Servan-Schreiber, head of the foreign affairs section, left the newspaper in the early 1950s, criticizing what he saw as its neutralism in East–West relations. In 1954, Le Monde diplomatique was launched. In 1955–1956, the Conseil national du patronat français, chaired by Georges Villiers, considered Le Monde too left-leaning and decided to support the launch of a competing daily, Le Temps de Paris. The operation was coordinated by Jean Jardin, a former close adviser to Pierre Laval. When the first issue appeared in March 1956, Beuve-Méry was reassured by what he considered the competitor's mediocre quality; publication ceased after only a few months.

In 1957, the newspaper refused to publish an article by Jean-Paul Sartre on the use of torture during the Algerian War. Under the Fifth Republic, the newspaper supported General de Gaulle's foreign policy, while criticizing his domestic policies.

=== 1969–1981: Evening newspaper of the centre-left ===
Hubert Beuve-Méry, the founder of the newspaper, retired in 1969. During the 1970s, the paper clearly moved toward supporting the Union of the Left and denounced the financial scandals that erupted under the Presidency of Valéry Giscard d'Estaing (notably the Diamonds Affair). The strong hostility of the newspaper's journalists toward Valéry Giscard d'Estaing was examined in a 2014 investigation entitled Le jour où... « Le Monde » choisit de torpiller Giscard ("The day when... 'Le Monde' chose to torpedo Giscard").

In her investigation, Raphaëlle Bacqué revisited the Diamond affair as it was experienced within Le Monde and emphasized the highly political nature of its coverage. She noted in particular the general hostility of the newsroom's journalists toward Giscard d'Estaing and their closeness to the Socialist and Communist opposition. She also described internal debates between those, such as political editor Raymond Barillon, who were cautious and reluctant to relay the revelations of Le Canard enchaîné, and others, such as columnist Philippe Boucher, who strongly opposed "Giscardism" and wanted to push the story further by linking it to additional revelations, including those reported by Minute concerning a building permit obtained by Raymond Barre and information about the African assets of Giscard's cousins. Philippe Boucher, later appointed to the Council of State by François Mitterrand, acknowledged in 2014 that he had been somewhat excessive in his handling of the affair.

At the time, although the editorial line did not explicitly claim to be left-wing, it was generally sympathetic to revolutionary socialist movements (Vietnam, the Portuguese Revolution), going so far as to headline "Phnom Penh liberated" when the city was taken by the Khmer Rouge in April 1975.

In 1981, Claude Julien succeeded Jacques Fauvet. Readership was then at its peak. The newspaper supported the candidacy of François Mitterrand in the 1981 French presidential election. After the Socialist candidate's victory, Jacques Fauvet wrote in the 11 May 1981 issue:

This victory is finally that of respect over disdain, realism over illusion, frankness over artifice—in short, that of a certain morality.

Following the election, the newspaper's open support for François Mitterrand cost it a significant number of readers.

=== 1982–1994: Financial and editorial difficulties ===
In 1985, André Laurens, who had succeeded Claude Julien in 1982, was removed from the newspaper's leadership following a decline in circulation. While the paper had sold an average of 434,000 copies between 1974 and 1981, circulation fell to 335,000 copies in 1985, dropping below the break-even point. Laurens was criticized in particular for his relationship with François Mitterrand's brand of socialism.

He was replaced by André Fontaine. Under Fontaine, the editorial line distanced itself from Mitterrandism, notably expressing skepticism about the nationalization policy pursued by Pierre Mauroy. The sinking of the Rainbow Warrior in particular allowed the newspaper to demonstrate its independence and led to a rebound in sales. Le Monde subsequently took a leading role in exposing scandals of the Mitterrand era, such as the Irish of Vincennes affair and the Carrefour du développement affair. A marked animosity then developed between Mitterrand and the newspaper, targeting in particular journalist Edwy Plenel. Several Le Monde journalists were subjected to illegal wiretapping by the authorities.

In 1985, BNP required the newspaper to sell its historic building on the Rue des Italiens. Le Monde moved to 15 Rue Falguière (15th arrondissement) in April 1989, into a building designed by architects Pierre du Besset and Dominique Lyon. It later relocated to 21 bis Rue Claude-Bernard (5th arrondissement) in 1996, and finally, in 2004, to Boulevard Auguste-Blanqui (13th arrondissement) in a building designed by architect Christian de Portzamparc, whose architecture was inspired by the former headquarters of The New York Times.

In 1989, due to competition from Libération and the revival of Le Figaro, circulation had declined by 40,000 copies over a ten-year period.

In February 1990, a triumvirate was appointed to succeed André Fontaine. Composed of Daniel Vernet (managing director), Bruno Frappat (editor-in-chief), and Martin Desprez (managing director for administration), it was ultimately replaced, following internal rivalries, by Bruno Frappat, who remained head of the newsroom, and economist Jacques Lesourne. Lesourne was elected director of publication of Le Monde on 8 January 1991, becoming the first non-journalist to hold the position.

=== 1994–2003: Colombani's expansion strategy ===
In 1994, Le Monde changed its legal status from a limited liability company (société à responsabilité limitée, SARL) to a public limited company (société anonyme, SA) with an executive board and a supervisory board. Following the resignation of Jacques Lesourne, who had been unable to halt the decline in circulation and advertising revenue, Jean-Marie Colombani, editor-in-chief, was elected director of publication of the newspaper in March 1994, first by the journalists' association and then by the newspaper's shareholders. In April 1994, he appointed Noël-Jean Bergeroux as editor-in-chief. In 1995, Colombani launched a new format for the daily newspaper.

During the 1995 French presidential election, Colombani's hostility toward Jacques Chirac following the Ouvéa cave hostage taking, the anti-Mitterrand stance of Edwy Plenel, (Note: His 1994 book Un temps de chien recalls the Rainbow Warrior affair, the Irish of Vincennes affair, the Carrefour du développement affair, the Urba affair, the Pechiney-Triangle affair, among others.) and the globalist outlook associated with Édouard Balladur and promoted by Alain Minc, chairman of the supervisory board of SA Le Monde, led the newspaper to be accused by its peers of "Balladurism." Le Canard enchaîné headlined on 18 January 1995, "Le Monde Balladurized? It's not a Minc affair," a controversy that unsettled part of its readership.

After an initial recapitalization of 295 million francs in 1995, Le Monde launched its presence on the Internet in 1996. LeMonde.fr offered online feature packages, a graphical version of the front page from 1:00 p.m., the full newspaper before 5:00 p.m., current news in cooperation with the Agence France-Presse, and sections devoted to the stock market, books, multimedia, and sports. Two years later, full online access to the newspaper cost five French francs (equivalent to €0.76), compared with 7.50 francs (€1.15) for the printed edition. Some articles from the weekly print supplement Télévision-Radio-Multimédia were made freely available online in a multimedia section later renamed "New Technologies."

Re-elected in 2000, Jean-Marie Colombani undertook the construction of a media group, the Groupe Le Monde. After an unsuccessful attempt to acquire L'Express from Vivendi Universal Publishing (formerly Havas) in 1997, he took control of the Les Journaux du Midi group (formerly Midi Libre SA) in 1999 and acquired a 30% stake in the "Publications de la vie catholique" in 2003, notably including La Vie, Courrier International, and Télérama, whose real estate assets were later sold. In 2002 and 2003, more than €60 million were raised through bonds redeemable in shares, increasing an already high level of long-term debt.

=== 2003–2008: Crisis of the newspaper and the executive board ===
In 2003, a series of books and academic works criticized the neutrality of the newspaper and targeted the three leading figures of Le Monde: Jean-Marie Colombani, Edwy Plenel, and Alain Minc. In the journal Actes de la recherche en sciences sociales, sociologist Patrick Champagne, associated with the Bourdieusian school, analyzed the evolution of the daily newspaper and the influence of Jean-Marie Colombani in an article entitled "Le médiateur entre deux mondes." These criticisms escalated into accusations with the publication of the essay La Face cachée du « Monde ». In February 2003, the book by Pierre Péan and Philippe Cohen argued, among other points, that the management team had deliberately shifted toward a logic of profitability and sales at the expense of journalistic ethics.

The authors also denounced the monthly salary of the newspaper's editor-in-chief (€26,000 per month), despite an estimated group loss of €25 million for the 2003 financial year (with consolidated revenue of €460 million, the year of acquisition of the La Vie catholique group). According to the book, the original editorial line had been altered to serve the power objectives of a small affiliated group, involving collusion with economic elites. Alleged disregard for raison d'État was also central to the critique. Other commentators accused the newspaper of editorial bias, claiming that it actively campaigned for Lionel Jospin during the 2002 French presidential election.

A highly publicized defamation lawsuit brought by the group was ultimately resolved through mediation by Guy Canivet, First President of the Court of Cassation, in June 2004, thereby avoiding a trial.

This mediation was criticized by the media watchdog group Acrimed as an attempt to stifle debate.

Alain Rollat, a journalist at Le Monde from 1977 to 2001, also sharply criticized what he viewed as managerial failings under Jean-Marie Colombani, whom he considered chiefly responsible for the growing influence of financial interests over the so-called newspaper of record. The publication of his testimony was largely ignored by his former colleagues.

Daniel Schneidermann, then an employee of Le Monde, criticized the newspaper's leadership in his book Le Cauchemar médiatique, arguing that management failed to respond substantively to the arguments made in La Face cachée du « Monde ». He was dismissed in October 2003 for "real and serious cause," with management claiming that a passage in his book was damaging to the company. Schneidermann sued the newspaper before the labour courts in Paris and won in May 2005, a decision upheld on appeal in March 2007.

Another investigative book, published the following year by Patrick de Saint-Exupéry on the Rwandan genocide, contributed, according to Éric Fottorino, to unease among journalists at Le Monde, as the newspaper had in 1994 endorsed what he later described as an erroneous narrative of a "double genocide" that exonerated French diplomacy.

On 29 November 2004, Edwy Plenel resigned as editor-in-chief and left the newspaper entirely in September 2005. Colombani appointed Patrick Jarreau as interim editor, recalling him from Washington.

In response to the crisis, Le Monde accepted a capital increase by the Lagardère Group and published a new format on 7 November 2005, prepared by Éric Fottorino and his think tank "Vivaldi." According to Fottorino, the overhaul of the newspaper's structure led to a sustained rise in reader satisfaction, exceeding 80 percent.

Tensions surrounding Lagardère's role intensified. In September 2005, after 24 years of partnership with the RTL program Le Grand Jury, the newspaper was replaced by Le Figaro, following Lagardère's capital increase and its ownership of rival radio station Europe 1.

On 3 May 2007, Colombani publicly called for a vote for Ségolène Royal. Three weeks later, on 22 May 2007, the journalists' association of Le Monde refused to grant him a third term as head of the executive board. Subsequent leadership changes culminated in a collective resignation in December 2007, followed by Éric Fottorino's appointment as president of the executive board in January 2008.

In January 2008, the newspaper was ordered by a Barcelona court to pay €300,000 in damages for defamation in an article concerning alleged doping practices at FC Barcelona.

The daily newspaper lost €15 million in 2007 alone, with circulation down 10 percent over four years and advertising revenue down 40 percent. Facing continued debt, the group undertook restructuring measures in 2008, including the sale of several subsidiaries.

=== 2009–2018: the Bergé–Pigasse–Niel trio ===
In May 2009, Éric Fottorino criticized Nicolas Sarkozy in an editorial for what he described as the president's "boastfulness and frenzy," triggering a crisis with shareholders. Billionaire Vincent Bolloré, a friend of the head of state, announced that he would stop printing his free daily Direct Matin on Le Monde printing presses. Le Journal du Dimanche, owned by billionaire Arnaud Lagardère, another close associate of Sarkozy, announced that it would change printers. Finally, Les Échos, owned by billionaire Bernard Arnault, also a personal friend of the president, terminated its contract with the printing plant owned by Le Monde. According to Éric Fottorino, "power was trying to suffocate us through industrial means."

During the same period, an investigation published by Le Monde highlighted the central role of the bank BNP Paribas in French crony capitalism, repeatedly citing its CEO, Michel Pébereau. This episode led BNP Paribas, despite being Le Monde's long-standing bank, to refuse to assist the newspaper while it was in severe financial difficulty. Fottorino later reflected that it was probably ill-timed, while negotiating the newspaper's future, to antagonize someone who held part of the solution, asking whether displeasing powerful actors condemned the paper to decline, while concluding that it was too late to turn back.

In June 2010, five potential buyers were presented: Le Nouvel Observateur, El País, the Italian publishing group that produces L'Espresso, the Swiss group Ringier, and a trio formed by Pierre Bergé (entrepreneur and owner of Têtu), Matthieu Pigasse (businessman, owner and president of Les Inrockuptibles), and Xavier Niel (founder of Free).

This bid prompted a meeting between President Nicolas Sarkozy and Éric Fottorino on 9 June 2010. The head of state warned that if the Bergé–Pigasse–Niel option were chosen, the state would forgo contributing €20 million to rescue the newspaper's printing operations.

At the end of June, the Bergé–Pigasse–Niel offer was overwhelmingly supported by employee shareholders. Orange and Le Nouvel Observateur withdrew their bids, and the choice was validated by a vote of the supervisory board on 28 June 2010 (11 votes in favor and 9 abstentions).

On 2 November 2010, the acquisition of the newspaper by the trio was formally approved. The Le Monde Group then came under the control of the holding company Le Monde libre, which held 64 percent of the capital and was owned by the three businessmen along with the Spanish media group Prisa.

The circumstances surrounding the sale were criticized in an article published in June 2011 by Le Monde diplomatique, entitled Comment « Le Monde » fut vendu.

On 14 September 2010, Le Monde announced that it had filed a complaint against unknown persons for violation of the protection of journalists' sources, after French intelligence services were used by the executive branch to identify the source of a newsroom journalist. Bernard Squarcini, head of the Direction centrale du renseignement intérieur (DCRI), acknowledged that he had ordered an intelligence inquiry into leaks related to the Bettencourt affair, an action widely viewed as infringing press freedom.

On 15 December 2010, Éric Fottorino was dismissed from his positions as chairman of the management board and publisher of Le Monde because of disagreements with shareholders. He was replaced as chairman by Louis Dreyfus, and on 7 February 2011, Érik Izraelewicz was appointed editor-in-chief of the group, a choice approved by journalists with 74 percent of the vote. Izraelewicz died suddenly on 27 November 2012, at the age of 58, after a heart attack at the newspaper's headquarters.

After an interim period led by Alain Frachon, Natalie Nougayrède was proposed on 1 March 2013 by the three main shareholders and became editor of Le Monde following a positive vote by the newsroom. Her mandate, alongside Louis Dreyfus, was to place the digital transformation at the center of their leadership.

This quickly led to tensions with the newsroom. In February 2014, protests erupted following the announcement of a mobility plan that involved shifting around fifty positions toward digital operations and eliminating several sections. On 6 May 2014, seven members of the editorial management resigned, citing major dysfunctions and a lack of trust and communication with editorial leadership. Lacking support from shareholders, Natalie Nougayrède resigned on 14 May 2014, stating that she no longer had the means to fully and calmly perform her duties.

A new organizational structure was introduced on 28 May 2014. Gilles van Kote was appointed interim director by the Bergé–Niel–Pigasse trio, pending a vote by the journalists' association, while Jérôme Fenoglio became head of the editorial staff.

On 6 October 2014, Le Monde launched a new layout described by its chief executive Louis Dreyfus as clearer and more open.

On 30 June 2015, following the resignation of Gilles van Kote and a second vote by the journalists' association, Jérôme Fenoglio became director of the daily newspaper, while Luc Bronner was appointed editor-in-chief.

The fact-checking section Les Décodeurs was created on 10 March 2014, and on 1 February 2017, its journalists launched a search engine known as Décodex.

Following the death of Pierre Bergé in September 2017, Xavier Niel and Matthieu Pigasse each bought half of his shares in Le Monde libre, which then held 72.5 percent of the Le Monde Group.

On 25 October 2018, Matthieu Pigasse sold 49 percent of his stake in the company Le Nouveau Monde to Czech billionaire Daniel Křetínský, owner of Czech Media Invest and the weekly Marianne, as well as part of the magazine division of the Lagardère Group. This move raised concerns within the newspaper's independence pole, which described the operation as abrupt, and generated tensions with Xavier Niel.

=== 2019–2020 ===
In March 2019, the Bill & Melinda Gates Foundation awarded the publishing company a grant of US$2,126,790 over three years for Le Monde Afrique, in order to support its coverage of development and global health in Africa and to inform and engage audiences through high-quality journalism.

The foundation was already a partner of Le Monde Afrique, having supported the project since its creation in 2015, and had previously awarded grants in this context.

In July of the same year, Matthieu Pigasse and Daniel Křetínský negotiated the purchase of the shares held by the Spanish group Prisa, which owned 20 percent of the Le Monde Group, triggering renewed tensions with Xavier Niel. Discussions also raised the possibility that Křetínský could take control of the holding company Le Nouveau Monde. These developments caused concern within the newsroom, which called for the preservation of editorial independence in a collective op-ed published in Le Monde.

The two main shareholders, Xavier Niel and Matthieu Pigasse, agreed to sign the approval rights mechanism requested by the newsroom.

Negotiations between Le Nouveau Monde and Prisa ultimately failed, and the approval rights granted the newspaper's independence pole the power to block changes in shareholder control.

At the beginning of 2020, all departments of the Le Monde Group moved into a new headquarters designed by the Norwegian architectural firm Snøhetta. The building is located on Avenue Pierre-Mendès-France, in the Paris Rive Gauche district of the 13th arrondissement of Paris, overlooking the railway tracks of Gare d'Austerlitz.

In July 2020, the group announced that it had recorded a net profit of €2.6 million in 2019 on revenue of €302.7 million, driven by strong growth in its digital subscriber base. For the third consecutive year, the group posted a positive financial result. However, the first half of 2020, marked by the COVID-19 pandemic in France, was expected to reduce group revenue by €18 million, with a 50 percent drop in advertising income.

According to the magazine Marianne, the newsroom of Le Monde, like other left-leaning newspapers, was divided between two camps described as multiculturalists and republican universalists. The divide was said to focus less on economic and political models, such as class struggle versus social democracy, and more on social issues including feminism, minorities, and Islam. The emergence of the #MeToo movement against harassment was described as triggering a major internal crisis at the newspaper, and an article by Zineb Dryef devoted to Assa Traoré also prompted internal criticism. Luc Bronner, then editor-in-chief, rejected accusations that the newspaper was being overly accommodating on these issues.

=== Since 2021 ===
In April 2021, Le Monde announced the creation of an endowment fund intended to ensure the group's long-term capital independence.

The newspaper's new headquarters in 2021, located at 67–69 Avenue Pierre-Mendès-France

On 1 January 2022, management announced a 20-cent increase in the newsstand price, citing rising production costs, particularly the price of paper.

The daily also faced the departure of its two most prominent cartoonists. Plantu, who had worked for the newspaper since 1 October 1972, ended his career at Le Monde in March 2021 after 50 years, leaving the front-page space to colleagues from the Cartooning for Peace collective. In January 2021, the newspaper's managing editor Caroline Monnot issued an apology for publishing a cartoon by Xavier Gorce that could be interpreted as minimizing the seriousness of incest and using inappropriate language with regard to victims and transgender people. After 18 years of collaboration, Gorce announced his departure from the newspaper, stating that "freedom is not negotiable" and criticizing pressure from social media activists.

In September 2022, the newspaper's management decided to remove from publication an opinion column by researcher Paul-Max Morin entitled "Réduire la colonisation en Algérie à une 'histoire d'amour' parachève la droitisation de Macron sur la question mémorielle" following protests from the Élysée Palace. According to the Élysée, the article contained a factual error resulting from a misinterpretation of remarks made by President Macron in Algiers.

In June 2024, the newspaper called on its readers to form a "republican front" against the National Rally in the 2024 French legislative election.

In October 2024, the supervisory board was renewed, with Aline Sylla-Walbaum appointed as chair. A former chief of staff to François Fillon, she is employed by Chaumet, owned by Bernard Arnault, and also serves as a board member of Unibail-Rodamco-Westfield, a company linked to Xavier Niel, the main shareholder of Le Monde and Arnault's son-in-law. She was joined on the board by Cécile Cabanis, also employed by Xavier Niel through Unibail.

In January 2025, Le Monde announced its decision to leave the X social network, citing the "intensification of activism" by Elon Musk and the "growing toxicity of exchanges" on the platform. The newsroom emphasized that this decision, though difficult, was part of an effort to preserve editorial independence and to avoid contributing to an environment harmful to public debate.

== Publications ==
=== The daily newspaper Le Monde ===
Le Monde is distinctive in that it is dated one day ahead of its actual publication date. In France, it is the only daily newspaper, together with Présent, that intended to retain this formula as of 2013. Its issue of the day is thus available from around 1:00 p.m. in Paris, Lyon, and Toulouse (as well as in printable digital format), and in the evening in a few major French cities, and everywhere else the following day, including internationally.

For example, an edition printed on Friday the 1st is dated Saturday the 2nd.

Although it is still commonly referred to as an "evening daily", Le Monde has in practice become a midday newspaper. Editorial deadlines take place in the morning at 10:30 a.m., making it possible to include news that breaks overnight or early in the morning, unlike most competing newspapers, which close their editions during the night.

As of 18 December 2025, the newspaper is structured as follows:

- Front page: consisting of an opinion column, very often accompanied by a current-affairs photograph; the editorial of the day in the center; a cartoon by Plantu at the bottom of the page; and other short items developed later in the paper;
- Page two: notably featuring the daily press cartoon by Xavier Gorce;
- Page three: named for its position, this page is devoted to an in-depth investigation of a specific topic, whether linked to recent events or to longer-term investigative reporting. A large space is devoted to images;
- Planet: one to two pages devoted to environmental news;
- International, International & Europe: four to five pages devoted to international and European news;
- France: three to four pages devoted to French news, primarily political;
- Economy: two to three pages devoted to economic, financial, and industrial news;
- Analysis: three to four pages reserved for debates (op-eds, opinion columns, public reactions, open letters, etc.) or for in-depth analysis of a current issue;
- Culture: two to three pages devoted to French and international cultural news. The Wednesday issue focuses on new film releases;
- & You: one page devoted to practical, everyday life;
- Obituaries: death notices, tributes, marriages, and births;
- Weather & games: the weather section has no longer appeared in print since 6 October 2014 following the launch of a new formula; it is available online on the newspaper's website;
- Final page (generally page 28): devoted to readers' letters and an opinion column by a public figure.

Each issue of Le Monde includes a counter-investigation, which may concern any section of the newspaper.

While the overall structure of the newspaper usually remains almost identical from one day to the next, the editorial staff may devote additional pages to a given topic in response to major news events. For example, during its coverage of the earthquake of March 2011 in Japan, the Planet section occupied nearly ten pages in some issues.

Since 2009, Le Monde has designated a "Personality of the Year". Recipients have included Brazilian president Luiz Inácio Lula da Silva in 2009 and Julian Assange in 2010.

For just over twenty years (2000–2021), Le Monde offered subscribers a PDF version of the print newspaper. In spring 2021, it informed subscribers that the PDF version was being discontinued due to fraud and unauthorized content sharing.

=== Le Monde.fr ===
Le Monde logo with ".fr", designed by Pierre Katz in June 2005

Le Monde has been present on the Internet under its own domain name (lemonde.fr) since 19 December 1995.

Almost all of the newspaper's textual content is freely accessible on the website every day in the early afternoon. Articles less than three days old are also freely available, although without the newspaper's photographic and infographic material. Additional sources are made available to readers, including news agency dispatches and blog posts.

Access to the archives is limited for subscribers to the newspaper, who are entitled to consult up to 25 archive articles per month free of charge; beyond that limit, archive access is paid. Since April 2002, it has been possible to subscribe to the paid section of the website, providing access to agency dispatches (AFP, AP, and Reuters), a database of election results updated since 1969, and multimedia content, including nearly one million Le Monde articles online, corresponding to the complete daily newspaper since 1987.

In addition, since September 2006, Le Monde has launched a new service, the Electronic Newspaper. This service makes it possible to read Le Monde online while benefiting from features specific to digital formats, such as page-flipping, digital zoom, and search functions. In July 2008, and again in March 2012, the website's homepage was completely redesigned.

The electronic edition of the newspaper was first created in 1994. It was developed internally and distributed on electronic networks through an agreement with CompuServe and Edelweb, a French company specializing in online security. The web version was launched on 19 December 1995, 51 years after the first print issue, and was produced by a team of three journalists recruited by Michel Colonna d'Istria.

Since 1999, the website has been published by the company Le Monde interactif, a majority-owned subsidiary of Le Monde with a 34% stake held by Lagardère. Le Monde interactif was initially chaired by Alain Giraudo, then by Bruno Patino, following the failure of the Tout.lemonde.fr portal launched in 2000. The CEO of Le Monde interactif was subsequently Philippe Jannet, who was replaced in 2012 by Isabelle André.

=== Les Décodeurs ===
Les Décodeurs is a section of the Le Monde website, created on 10 March 2014, which is dedicated to fact-checking. According to a book by Rémy Rieffel and Jean-Baptiste Legavre, professors of information and communication sciences at Paris-Panthéon-Assas University's French Press Institute, the success of sections such as Les Décodeurs at Le Monde or "Désintox" at Libération is the result of "the valorization within newsrooms of fact-checking, intended to control the accuracy of statements made by politicians".

It is "a well-deserved success", according to journalist Fidel Navamuel, editor of the website "Les Outils du Web". Around ten journalists work in this section, which was formally created in 2014 after operating for three years as a blog.

The Les Décodeurs section is funded in particular by Facebook.

According to Louis Dreyfus, "it is Facebook that enabled us to finance part of the growth of our teams, while respecting the integrity of the content".

This partnership was strengthened in 2019, with Facebook becoming the newspaper's leading external driver of subscriptions.

==== Décodex ====
On 1 February 2017, three years after its creation, Les Décodeurs launched "Décodex", a search engine accessible via its website or through a browser extension. It is presented as "a tool for verifying information intended for teachers (and others)". Décodex relies on a database of hundreds of websites, mainly French but also English, American, and German. Its primary purpose is to help distinguish reliable sources from misleading, conspiratorial, or highly biased websites. It had 1000 websites by the end of 2017 divided into 4 categories: regular disseminators of fake news, occasional disseminators, satirical websites and generally reliable sources.

=== LeMonde.fr blogs ===
Since the early 2000s, lemonde.fr allowed its subscribers to publish blogs hosted on the website. On 10 April 2019, the newspaper announced that this service would end on 5 June of the same year. Posts from the 400 subscriber blogs hosted by Le Monde were preserved by the Bibliothèque nationale de France, with some blogs also archived by the German National Library.

=== Smartphone and tablet applications ===
On 13 November 2008, Le Monde launched one of the first news applications for smartphones and tablets, initially for the iPhone and iPad. The application was available free of charge via the newly created App Store. It was downloaded more than 100,000 times within fifteen days and 500,000 times within six months.

In 2011, the application "Le Monde: l'info en continu" was released on Android.

In 2015, a new freemium application, La Matinale du Monde, became available on the App Store and Google Play.

Since 15 September 2016, Le Monde, along with seven other French newspaper publishers (Paris Match, Vice, L'Équipe, Melty, Cosmopolitan, Konbini, and Tastemade), has published daily exclusive content and a distinctive visual experience on Discover, the media section of the Snapchat application.

=== Supplements, sections, and titles ===
Le Monde publishes daily, weekly, and monthly supplements, as well as various occasional special supplements. (Note: For some supplements whose names use an ampersand, Le Monde adopts a distinctive typographic style, without spaces around the ampersand in the specific part of the supplement title: éco&entreprise, science&médecine, culture&idées, sport&forme, argent&patrimoine. The case of the supplement universités & grandes écoles is particular: its name is printed on two lines, with a space after the ampersand. Finally, the supplement formerly called géo&politique was later renamed géopolitique.)

==== Daily ====
- Le Monde éco & entreprise, a daily supplement (since May 2013), published in 8 to 12 pages. Previously a weekly supplement, it appeared with the Tuesday-dated edition of the newspaper. Titled Le Monde économie until April 2012, it then changed its name to the current one while keeping the same publication day and frequency (except for several weeks during summer and Christmas). This supplement contained feature stories, analyses, and interviews devoted to the economy, markets, and business life. From March 2019, Le Monde returned to the original format by reintegrating the Economy pages into the main section, marking the end of eight years of development of the supplement with its own front page.

==== Weekly ====
- Le Monde Science & Médecine, published as a supplement to the Wednesday-dated edition of the daily (except in August and at Christmas), comprising 8 pages. Until May 2013, the supplement was titled Le Monde science&techno and appeared with the "Weekend" edition dated Saturday;
- Le Monde des livres, founded in 1967 by Jacqueline Piatier, published as a supplement to the Friday-dated edition of the daily (except in August and at Christmas), comprising 8 to 10 pages. It covers publishing news and reviews of major new releases across all genres, from classical literature to graphic novels;
- Le Monde Idées (formerly Le Monde culture&idées), published as a supplement to the Saturday-dated "Weekend" edition of the daily, comprising 8 pages. From March 2019, this supplement was discontinued and replaced by "Ideas" pages integrated into the main section;
- M, le magazine du Monde (formerly Le Monde 2 and Le Monde magazine), published as a supplement to the Saturday-dated edition of the daily. It features lifestyle news, fashion and beauty, design, culture, and related topics.

==== Monthly ====
- Le Monde Argent, focusing on financial news (loans, savings, investments, real estate, borrowing). The supplement became Le Monde argent & patrimoine in November 2012, with a variable monthly publication date, then adopted its current name from February 2014;
- Le Monde Université et Grandes Écoles, analyzing education news for parents, teachers, and students. The supplement took the name Le Monde universités & grandes écoles in May 2012 and appears as a supplement to the Thursday-dated edition of the daily.

The daily newspaper also publishes more than 30 occasional special supplements each year, including Le Monde des vins, Europa (in collaboration with non-French newspapers), and supplements devoted to major cultural events (Avignon Festival, Lyon Biennale, etc.).

==== Former supplements ====
- Le Monde géopolitique, a former supplement to the Thursday-dated edition of the daily, usually comprising 8 pages. Initially titled Le Monde géo&politique, it was first published with the Sunday-dated edition and, from May 2013, with the Thursday-dated edition, along with a name change in September 2013. Publication of the supplement ceased with the issue dated 19 December 2013. Four geopolitics pages were reintegrated into the main section of the Sunday–Monday-dated edition of Le Monde from late 2015;
- Le Monde Sports (formerly Le Monde sport&forme), published as a supplement to the Saturday-dated "Weekend" edition and comprising 8 pages. Publication of this supplement permanently ceased on 18 March 2017, with two sports pages reintegrated into the main section of the Saturday-dated issue;
- Le Monde télévisions, published as a supplement to the Sunday-dated edition of the daily, comprising 28 or 32 pages. It covered news across all screens (television and web), as well as a selection of television and radio programs for the coming week. From 6 October 2014, this supplement was discontinued in favor of a daily page in the main section of the newspaper and three pages in the Sunday–Monday-dated edition.

==== Anthologies and selections ====
The most significant articles published in Le Monde and its supplements are also collected and published in various formats:

- Le Monde Sélection hebdomadaire (since 1948), dated Saturday, a 12-page publication featuring the best articles from the previous week, sold exclusively by subscription;
- Le Monde mensuel, a selection of the best articles from the previous month, published from February 2010 to January 2014;
- Dossiers et Documents, a monthly publication issued from 1973 to September 2013, aimed at high school and university students, compiling one or two dossiers per issue on economic, historical, political, or social topics.

== Governance ==
=== Shareholding ===
Le Monde is a subsidiary of the Groupe Le Monde, which also publishes L'Obs, Télérama, Le Monde diplomatique, La Vie, and Courrier international.

The Le Monde Group is owned:

- 75% by the holding company Le Monde Libre;
- 25% by the Pôle d'Indépendance du Monde (Le Monde Independence Trust).

Le Monde Libre is owned by Nouveau Monde (bringing together Matthieu Pigasse and NJJ Holding

(Xavier Niel), Berly Media (Madison Cox), and the Spanish group PRISA.

The Pôle d'Indépendance du Monde brings together several organizations, including the Société des rédacteurs du Monde (editors' society), the Société des lecteurs du Monde (readers' society), the Société des employés du Monde (employees' society), the Société des personnels de Courrier international, the staff association of L'Obs, and the association of minority shareholders.

=== Independence ===
To avoid shareholder pressure on journalists, as can occur in some media outlets, Le Monde has adopted specific governance safeguards.

Under the newspaper's statutes, the appointment of the editor-in-chief must be approved by at least 60% of the journalists on staff.

Since 2017, following amendments to Le Monde statutes, the Pôle d'Indépendance du Monde has held a golden share protecting its statutory rights regardless of its capital share. Minority shareholders therefore have the power to block certain decisions by majority shareholders.

In 2020, Xavier Niel, one of the shareholders of the Le Monde Libre holding, placed all of his shares into a special endowment fund. This fund is legally inalienable. However, the researcher Julia Cagé, who heads the Société des lecteurs du Monde, has pointed out weaknesses in the governance of the fund, which remains under the control of Xavier Niel and his heirs.

The growing number of employees directly linked to Xavier Niel on the supervisory board has also raised concerns about independence, especially as some have close ties to the political sphere.

=== Finances ===
Each year, the Le Monde Group shares its financial statements (balance sheet and income statement) with Le Monde readers. In 2021, the group's revenue amounted to €301 million.

Subscriptions are currently the newspaper's main source of revenue.

The newsroom of Le Monde employs 520 journalists on permanent contracts, not including the staffs of other Le Monde Group publications (L'Obs, Télérama, or La Vie).

Journalists belong to a union, the Société des rédacteurs du Monde.

Le Monde also benefits from French press subsidies. From 2003 to 2010, it received €2.95 million from the press modernization fund. In 2010, it was the second French daily newspaper receiving the most state subsidies, with €17 million in direct aid. In 2011 and 2012, it ranked first, with €16.9 million and €18.6 million respectively.

In 2021, its subsidy amounted to €8 million.

=== Management ===
==== Directors ====
- Hubert Beuve-Méry (1944–1969)
- Jacques Fauvet (1969–1981)
- Claude Julien (1981–1982)
- André Laurens (1982–1985)
- André Fontaine (1985–1991)
- Jacques Lesourne (1991–1994)
- Jean-Marie Colombani (1994–2007)
- Pierre Jeantet (June 2007 – February 2008)
- Éric Fottorino (February 2008 – December 2010)
- Érik Izraelewicz (February 2011 – November 2012)
- Alain Frachon (acting, November 2012 – March 2013)
- Natalie Nougayrède (March 2013 – May 2014)
- Gilles van Kote (acting, May 2014 – May 2015)
- Jérôme Fenoglio (June 2015 – )

==== Editors-in-chief ====
- Bruno Frappat (1991–1994)
- Noël Bergeroux (1994–1996)
- Edwy Plenel (1996–2004)
- Gérard Courtois (2004–2006)
- Éric Fottorino (2006 – September 2007)
- Alain Frachon (1 September 2007 – 17 January 2010)
- Sylvie Kauffmann (18 January 2010 – June 2011)
- Érik Izraelewicz (June 2011 – 27 November 2012)
- Alain Frachon (acting, 30 November 2012 – March 2013)
- Natalie Nougayrède (March 2013 – May 2014)
- Jérôme Fenoglio (May 2014 – June 2015)
- Luc Bronner (June 2015 – December 2020)
- Caroline Monnot (from 1 January 2021)

== Circulation and readership ==
Circulation in copies Total Paid circulation in France

Data from the OJD and subsequently from the Alliance pour les chiffres de la presse et des médias (ACPM):

Year	Paid circulation in France		Total circulation
1962	N/A		182,408
1963	N/A		188,723
1964	N/A		200,457
1965	N/A		230,012
1966	N/A		251,399
1967	N/A		294,722
1968	N/A		354,982
1969	N/A		354,623
1979	353,915	—N/a	—N/a
1987	289,893	—N/a	362,443
1988	311,416	—N/a	377,489
1989	316,210	311416	371,611
1990	322,931	316210	375,285
1991	—N/a	—N/a	368,970
1992	—N/a	—N/a	357,362
1993	308,157	—N/a	351,706
1994	302,203	308157	354,129
1995	321,366	302203	379,089
1996	325,009	321366	377,206
1997	338,640	325009	382,944
1998	341,168	338640	—N/a
1999	346,125	341168	390,840
2000	—N/a	—N/a	392,772
2001	358,978	+3.0%	405,983
2002	361,254	358978	407,085
2003	345,231	361254	389,249
2004	330,768	345231	371,803
2005	320,704	−3.0%	360,610
2006	312,265	−2.6%	350,039
2007	N/A		350,039
2008	300,522	−5.2%	340,131
2009	288,049	−4.1%	323,039
2010	286,348	−0.6%	319,022
2011	292,765	+2.2%	325,295
2012	318,236	−1.6%	288,113
2013	275,310	−4.4%	303,432
2014	273,111	−0.8%	298,529
2015	267,897	−1.9%	292,054
2016	269,584	+0.6%	289,555
2017	284,738	+5.6%	301,528
2018	288,435	+1.3%	302,624
2019	323,565	288435	336,522
2020	393,109	323565	401,732
2021	445,894	393109	452,869
2022	472,767	445894	479,243
2023	488,802	472767	494,500
2024	528,709	488802	533,794

According to the OJD, in 2003 just over half of subscribers to the online edition were print subscribers using their digital access rights:

- January 2003: 30,597
- December 2003: 44,687

In 2007, the newspaper's readership reached 1,895,000 readers (EPIQ 2006–2007–LNM), 56% of whom belonged to higher socio-professional categories.

In 2020, circulation reached 393,109 copies per issue, an increase of 20.75%.

Until the 2000s, Le Monde was the most widely circulated French newspaper abroad, with daily foreign circulation of around 40,000 copies, falling to 26,000 copies in 2012.

As of 31 October 2023, Le Monde had 592,000 subscribers, including 517,000 digital-only subscribers.

== Criticism, controversies, and condemnations ==
=== 1970s ===
In 1976, Michel Legris published Le Monde tel qu'il est. According to this former Le Monde journalist (1956–1972), the newspaper's editorial line had shifted to the left, notably by supporting François Mitterrand, and by adopting a conciliatory stance toward Mao Zedong's China.

The Mitrokhin Archive—documents provided by Vasili Mitrokhin, a former KGB agent—also mention Le Monde reporting on the Vietnam War, asserting that in July 1975 the newspaper used a "distorted account" of a speech by Russian dissident Aleksandr Solzhenitsyn in the United States in order to "defame him by portraying him as a Nazi sympathizer". Although there was no evidence that the account had been introduced by a KGB agent, it was, according to Mitrokhin's book, "entirely consistent with the disinformation the KGB sought to spread in the Western press".

In January 1977, Le Monde published a petition and a statement written by Gabriel Matzneff in support of defendants in a pedophilia case (the Versailles affair). In May of the same year, it also published an open letter "calling for the revision of certain legislative texts governing relations between adults and minors".

=== 1990s ===
In September 1998, Érik Izraelewicz, then editor-in-chief of Le Monde and previously responsible for its economic coverage, published an article in the journal Revue des sciences humaines. He explained how social news, which had previously taken precedence at Le Monde, was gradually merged with economic news as the latter gained prominence, and how corporate news progressively came to dominate the economic and social section. Serge Halimi, director of Le Monde diplomatique, added ironically in his political essay Le Grand Bond en arrière (2004; reissued in 2006 and 2012): "Then an 'business' supplement is created (Le Monde des affaires). Finally, it will regularly be Le Monde Argent."

In 1999, the newspaper's editorial staff "chose intervention" in Kosovo, as acknowledged by Edwy Plenel. Journalists Pierre Rimbert and Serge Halimi accused the paper of contributing to disinformation by uncritically relaying accusations made by Western governments against Serbia. The newspaper devoted several front pages to Operation Horseshoe (a purported plan for ethnic cleansing by Serbia), which was in fact an invention of the German government intended to justify NATO's entry into the war.

=== 2000s ===
In March 2021, Le Monde was accused by the director of the magazine Le Point, Franz-Olivier Giesbert, of having, two decades earlier under the editorship of Edwy Plenel, "conducted a disgraceful campaign" against Dominique Baudis, who was "falsely accused of sexual crimes before dying shortly afterward of advanced cancer". The accusation referred to an article written by one of Plenel's associates, Jean-Paul Besset, in which "red masses and sadomasochistic parties" were mentioned.

In the spring of 2003, the false nature of testimonies given before the investigating judge and broadcast on television news against Dominique Baudis—who died eleven years later, in 2014—was quickly established. The emotion generated by the so-called Alègre affair, named after one of its protagonists, was later used in 2010, during the Bettencourt affair, by the government against the former editor-in-chief of Le Monde, who had since become a co-founder of the investigative journalism website Mediapart.

On 27 September 2003, the mediator of Le Monde published an assessment of the newspaper's coverage of the affair, recalling that it had "avoided falling into certain traps, in particular, unlike other media outlets, the false testimony of the mythomaniac transvestite Djamel". Although "aware for a long time that Dominique Baudis's name was mentioned in police reports", the newspaper stated that it had "waited, before reporting it, until he agreed to speak and respond in our pages", and that it had consistently "reported on the counterattacks" by the former mayor of Toulouse, "to the point of being the first to reveal his denunciation of a 'political conspiracy'". The newspaper nevertheless expressed regret over "the publication of certain excerpts from investigative records, a report from the outskirts of Toulouse whose content was contradicted by the courts, and the uncorroborated account of the late testimony of a prostitute".

The report from the outskirts of Toulouse, devoted to the search of a house by gendarmes and signed by Nicolas Fichot and Jean-Paul Besset, was dated 16 June 2003. This was three weeks after a male prostitute questioned by gendarmes had testified on 22 May 2003, filmed from behind under the pseudonym Djamel, on TF1's 8 p.m. news, about sadomasochistic parties, claiming that there had been "deaths". Three days later, on 25 May 2003, he claimed on France 2's 8 p.m. news that he had seen, at these gatherings, a young girl who had disappeared in the region.

The role of television and of the regional daily La Dépêche du Midi, which had launched a press campaign starting on 1 April 2003 on the basis of statements by two prostitutes—triggering the media frenzy that affected Dominique Baudis—was later denounced in the television film Notable, donc coupable, broadcast in November 2016. The film was adapted from the book Le Bûcher de Toulouse by Marie-France Etchegoin and Matthieu Aron, journalists at L'Obs and France Info.

=== 2010s ===
In May 2011, irritated by the content of an article in Le Monde devoted to François Mitterrand and written by historian François Cusset, shareholder Pierre Bergé said that he "regretted" having invested in the daily newspaper.

In June 2011, the monthly Le Monde diplomatique published an article by journalist Pierre Rimbert criticizing the gradual erosion of editorial independence at Le Monde. The article notably quoted a statement by billionaire and Le Monde shareholder Xavier Niel: "When journalists piss me off, I buy a stake in their paper and then they leave me alone".

In July 2012, Le Monde diplomatique reported remarks by Éric Fottorino, former director of Le Monde, who stated: "Le Monde has joined the ranks of those renowned titles whose fate is now tied to capital and the goodwill of industrial or financial captains". Serge Halimi, director of Le Monde diplomatique, added ironically that "having been an advocate of "happy globalization," Le Monde has become its prey".

In Un Monde à part (2013), Jean-Marie Colombani also criticized the newspaper's 'evolution as a result of its new shareholders, arguing that it was no longer a "journal run by journalists", but rather "engaged on the left simply by virtue of its ownership" (Pierre Bergé, Xavier Niel, Matthieu Pigasse). Because of this same ownership structure, the former editor stated that the newspaper "is no longer independent of economic power".

Journalists at the daily have also been criticized for excessive politicization. Adam Nossiter of The New York Times described Le Monde as "frenetic toward Nicolas Sarkozy and lacking distance with respect to the National Front".

In 2013, the media watchdog association Acrimed accused Le Monde of participating in the near-unanimous support of French media for European austerity policies, of failing to review certain widely successful books critical of French journalism, and of using its brand image to sell products unrelated to journalism.

Although the newspaper's management has denied these accusations, the neutrality of Le Monde's coverage of candidates in the French presidential election has been questioned by Acrimed and Arrêt sur images, which denounced an unacknowledged bias in favor of Emmanuel Macron.

In October 2019, the newspaper's website mistakenly announced the death of Bernard Tapie. The article was quickly withdrawn.

==== 2012 presidential election ====
On 10 April 2012, Le Monde ran a front-page headline stating that "Marine Le Pen comes out on top among 18–24-year-olds", based on a survey by the CSA Institute conducted from 12 to 18 March 2012. In that poll, "the subsample of 18–24-year-olds included fewer than 200 people", which Le Monde did not disclose to its readers, according to the Commission des sondages.

Other polling institutes produced different results regarding young voters' intentions. For all other polls during the 2012 French presidential election, Le Monde partnered with Ipsos. Its poll dated 10 April 2012 did not yet show an increase for Marine Le Pen, who then received 15 percent of voting intentions, compared with 16 percent two weeks earlier. Marine Le Pen ultimately obtained 18 percent of the votes among 18–24-year-olds in the first round, almost the same proportion as in the overall electorate (17.90 percent).

== Criticism of Les Décodeurs ==
Les Décodeurs have prompted questions and criticism. Journalist Vincent Glad considers the intentions laudable but highlights the difficulty of expressing an "impartial and transparent" judgment.

Daniel Schneidermann also argued in Libération that, in this role, Le Monde is "judge and party." He further fears that the ranking has little effect on readers, as it would mainly be useful to those already convinced, and criticizes its tendency to favor professional media outlets, citing Valeurs actuelles as an example—then rated green by Décodex (later downgraded to orange).

== 2020s ==
In 2021, Le Monde was heavily criticized by scientists and other media outlets after publishing a summer feature perceived as overly sympathetic to Anthroposophy and its pseudoscientific tenets.

During the 2022 FIFA World Cup, an editorial in the newspaper denounced what it described as "last-minute accusations" against host country Qatar. Critics noted that concerns about Qatar and FIFA had been raised since the tournament was awarded more than a decade earlier.

On 2 December 2023, the government of Burkina Faso suspended Le Monde from "all distribution channels" following the publication of an article on a deadly attack in the north of the country carried out by the Group for the Support of Islam and Muslims (GSIM). The newspaper was reinstated and then suspended again in April 2024, with its correspondent expelled, after publishing an article alleging massacres of civilians by the national army.

In January 2024, controversy arose within the newsroom following the appointment of Rayan Nezzar, partner of political editor Ivanne Trippenbach, to the cabinet of Prime Minister Gabriel Attal. Several journalists raised concerns about a potential conflict of interest, prompting the Société des rédacteurs du Monde to refer the matter to the ethics committee of the Le Monde Group. Trippenbach subsequently stepped down from her position and moved to the special correspondents' desk.

In December 2024, an investigation by Le Figaro journalist Eugénie Bastié alleged internal unease at Le Monde over its coverage of Israeli policy and the Palestinian question. Le Monde removed internal displays referenced in the article, stating they "may have shocked" readers.

A subsequent counter-investigation by Off Investigation claimed that several assertions in the Figaro article were false or exaggerated. Le Monde also criticized the use of anonymous sources to undermine a competing outlet widely regarded by some scholars as France's newspaper of record.

== Judicial convictions ==
In 2007, Le Monde was convicted of defamation against the general director of the Grand Théâtre de Genève.

In November 2009, Le Monde and its subsidiary Le Monde Interactif were each fined €1,500 by the Paris Criminal Court for defaming Socialist MP Julien Dray. The 17th chamber of the Paris Tribunal de grande instance criticized the journalist for using information from Tracfin relating to an investigation into the MP, which gave it "an appearance of credibility," without warning readers of the necessary caution at that stage of the investigation; and for having "failed to exercise due care" by not giving Mr. Dray the opportunity to respond, and by not recalling the "unilateral and non-adversarial" nature of the Tracfin note. Julien Dray ultimately received only a formal warning.

In 2012, Le Monde was convicted of infringing the presumption of innocence of Pierre Falcone in relation to an article published in 2009.

In February 2014, Le Monde was definitively convicted by the Spanish courts and ordered to compensate two football clubs for infringement of the right to honor. The newspaper was ordered to pay €300,000 in damages to Real Madrid and €15,000 to FC Barcelona following an article accusing players of doping without evidence. In rejecting Le Monde's appeal in the case involving FC Barcelona, the Supreme Court of Spain ruled in 2011 that "the information published was not truthful, the newspaper having used inconsistent and uncorroborated data, and the journalist having insufficiently verified his sources in a case whose seriousness would have plunged the club into disrepute."

Le Monde was convicted on 7 October 2016, of defamation after attributing to actor John Malkovich a hidden Swiss bank account in a subsidiary of HSBC. This conviction was upheld on 24 May 2017, by the Paris Court of Appeal. Journalists Gérard Davet and Fabrice Lhomme were each fined €1,500, and the publication director €1,000. All three were jointly ordered to pay €10,000 in damages to John Malkovich.

On 17 December 2019, Le Monde and journalist Adrien Senecat were convicted by the Paris Tribunal de grande instance of public defamation against Olivier Berruyer, founder and editor of the blog les-crises.fr, and ordered to pay €1,500 in damages. On the same day, Samuel Laurent—then head of the Les Décodeurs section at Le Monde—was convicted for a defamatory tweet against Olivier Berruyer.

In June 2023, Le Monde was convicted by the Paris Commercial Court of unfair competition by disparagement against FranceSoir and ordered to pay €25,000 in damages. The commercial judge held that "the criticism by Le Monde against France-Soir [...] is likely to cause serious harm to its business model [...] which runs counter to free competition and freedom of trade." Le Monde appealed the decision, viewing it as "a serious and disproportionate infringement on freedom of criticism." An analysis by CheckNews of Libération noted that the procedure was based on commercial law and was applicable only between entities in a potential competitive situation with France-Soir due to the "distribution of information via their websites."

== Censorship ==
- Le Monde is blocked in China, including its digital edition.
- In 2009, an issue of Le Monde was banned from sale in Morocco because it contained a poll on the popularity of King Mohammed VI.
- In 2010, an issue of Le Monde was blocked in Morocco after publishing WikiLeaks revelations deemed defamatory by the Moroccan authorities, concerning corruption in the country and implicating individuals close to the king.

== Iconography ==
Le Monde au Bain Turc (after Ingres) is a 1973 lithograph by the Peruvian painter Herman Braun-Vega. In this work, the artist juxtaposes the conviviality of the scene in The Turkish Bath painted by Jean-Auguste-Dominique Ingres with the harsher reality of current events surrounding the Vietnam War, as reported on the front page of Le Monde dated 26 January 1973.

== See also ==
- Editorial independence
- Newspapers in France
- Journalism in France
- Prix littéraire du Monde

== Bibliography ==
- Chatelain, Abel (1962). Le Monde et ses lecteurs [Le Monde and Its Readers]. Kiosque (in French). Paris: Armand Colin.
- Schwœbel, Jean (1968). La Presse, le pouvoir et l'argent [The Press, Power, and Money] (in French). Preface by Paul Ricœur. Paris: Éditions du Seuil.
- Guedj, Aimé; Jacques Girault (1970). Le Monde... Humanisme, objectivité et Politique [Le Monde... Humanism, Objectivity, and Politics] (in French). Paris: Éditions sociales.
- Legris, Michel (1976). « Le Monde » tel qu'il est ["Le Monde" as It Is] (in French). Paris: Plon.
- Simonnot, Philippe (1977). Le Monde et le pouvoir [Le Monde and Power] (in French). Paris: Les Presses d'aujourd'hui.
- Thibau, Jacques (1978). « Le Monde » : histoire d'un journal, un journal dans l'histoire ["Le Monde": History of a Newspaper, a Newspaper in History] (in French). Paris: J.-C. Simoën.
- Jeanneney, Jean-Noël; Jacques Julliard (1979). Le Monde de Beuve-Méry ou Le métier d'Alceste [The World of Beuve-Méry, or the Craft of Alceste] (in French). Paris: Éditions du Seuil.
- Eveno, Patrick (1996). « Le Monde » : histoire d'une entreprise de presse, 1944–1995 ["Le Monde": History of a Press Company, 1944–1995] (in French). Paris: Le Monde. ISBN 2-87899-143-5.
- Eveno, Patrick (2001). Le journal « Le Monde » : une histoire d'indépendance [The Newspaper "Le Monde": A story of independence] (in French). Paris: Éditions Odile Jacob. ISBN 2-7381-0946-2.
- Péan, Pierre; Philippe Cohen (2003). La Face cachée du « Monde » : du contre-pouvoir aux abus de pouvoir [The Hidden Face of "Le Monde": From Counterpower to Abuse of Power] (in French). Paris: Éditions des Mille et Une Nuits.
- Rollat, Alain (2003). Ma part du « Monde » : vingt-cinq ans de liberté d'expression [My share of "Le Monde": twenty-five years of freedom of expression] (in French). Paris: Éditions de Paris. ISBN 2-84621-040-3.
- Eveno, Patrick (2004). Histoire du journal « Le Monde », 1944–2004 [History of the Newspaper "Le Monde", 1944–2004] (in French). Paris: Albin Michel. ISBN 2-226-21373-2.
- Fottorino, Éric (2012). Mon tour du Monde [My Tour of the World] (in French). Paris: Éditions Gallimard. ISBN 978-2-07-013419-9.
