= Natalie Nougayrède =

French journalist

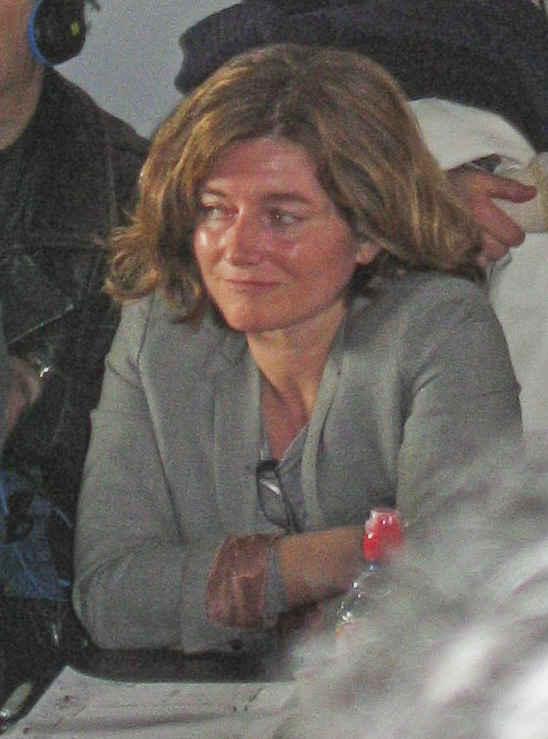
- Nougayrède in 2014
- Born: 29 May 1966 (age 60); Dijon, France
- Education: Sciences Po Strasbourg; Centre de formation des journalistes
- Occupation: Journalist
- Writing career
- Notable awards: Prix de la Presse Diplomatique; Albert Londres Prize

Natalie Nougayrède (born 29 May 1966) is a French journalist. She is the first woman to be the executive and managing editor of Le Monde. She is a recipient of the Prix de la Presse Diplomatique and the Albert Londres Prize.

== Early life and education ==
Nougayrède was born in Dijon, France on 29 May 1966. She graduated from the Institut d'Études Politiques de Strasbourg in 1988 and the Centre de Formation des Journalistes in 1990.

== Career ==
Nougayrède first began reporting in 1991 and covered topics in Eastern Europe. She joined the French newspaper Libération in 1995 before joining Le Monde in 1997. She became known for her coverage of Russian news and won two awards, the 2004 Prix de la Presse Diplomatique and the 2005 Albert Londres Prize, for her coverage on the Second Chechen War and the Beslan school siege.

Nougayrède was based in Paris from 2005 and became known for asking French officials difficult questions despite pressure from the government on Le Monde for her to stop. The newspaper accused the government of boycotting Nougayrède when her invitations to press conferences and official events was rescinded after she posed questions to the Foreign Minister Bernard Kouchner.

In 2013, Nougayrède became the first woman to be the executive and managing editor Le Monde since its establishment in 1944. She resigned May 2014 because of disputes over proposed changes.

After resigning from Le Monde, Nougayrède became a writer and foreign affairs commentator for the British newspaper, The Guardian. She was also a Richard von Weizsacker Fellow at the Robert Bosch Academy, a member of the European Council on Foreign Relations (ECFR), and a member of the Preparatory Committee of the European Press Prize.
