= Groupe Le Monde =

French media conglomerate

- Company type: Public (Société Anonyme)
- Industry: Newspapers
- Founded: April 12, 2000; 26 years ago
- Headquarters: 67, avenue Pierre Mendès, Paris, France
- Key people: Louis Dreyfus (Chairman); Jean-Louis Beffa (President and CEO)
- Products: Newspapers, Magazines, Internet Sites
- Parent: Le Monde libre & Pôle d'indépendance du Groupe Le Monde
- Subsidiaries: Le Monde; Télérama; La Vie; Courrier international
- Website: www.lemonde.fr

Groupe Le Monde (previously known as groupe La Vie-Le Monde) or Société éditrice du Monde is a French mass media company that publishes the Le Monde newspaper. Their headquarters are located in Paris, France.

== History ==
Before the end of the year 2006, the group La Vie-Le Monde, majority shareholder since 2005 of the group Les Journaux du Midi (Midi Libre, L'Indépendant, Centre Presse), formed a plan to take control of the regional daily papers of the company Groupe Hachette-Filipacchi (Groupe Nice-matin, La Provence) through a holding company with the subsidiary Lagardère. The new entity would then become the owner of all the regional daily newspapers in the southeast of France, from Perpignan to Nice and Corsica. This plan having fallen through by 2007, les Journaux du Midi were bought by Groupe Sud-Ouest, whereas the journals of the South-east came under the aegis of Groupe Hersant Média. In 2006, Groupe Monde sold Éditions Desclée de Brouwer to the Swiss publisher Parole et Silence, specializing in Christian spirituality.

In July 2007, Pierre Jeantet succeeded Jean-Marie Colombiani as president of the Board, with Bruno Pattino as vice-president and Éric Fottorino as the executive editor of Le Monde. After his resignation on September 17, 2007, following disagreements regarding the management and development strategy with the editorial staff of Le Monde, a leading shareholder in the group, he was replaced by the editorial director of Le Monde, Éric Fottorino on January 25, 2008.

At the end of 2008, it let go of the religious bookstore La Procure, which had been under the control of the groupe des Publications de la Vie catholique since 1975. In April 2008, it put the publishing company of Cahiers du cinéma, les Éditions de l'Étoile, up for sale. In January 2009, the art publishing company Phaidon, headquartered in London, became the new owner. Also in 2009, the company sold its youth division, composed of Fleurus presse, Junior hebdo to Héros et Patrimoine, a company held by Financière de loisirs and by the American investment fund Open Gate Capital.

Following the buyout of the company on November 2, 2010 by the trio "BNP", composed of Pierre Bergé, Xavier Niel and Matthieu Pigasse the president of the group, Éric Fottorino, was removed as president because of diverging points of view with the new shareholders on December 15, 2010.

In January 2015, the group announced the construction of a new headquarters in the 13th Arrondissement of Paris near the gare d'Austerlitz. It would house the publishing staff of Le Monde as well as L'Obs. The seven-story building, covering 22,500 square meters, was designed by the Norwegian design firm Snøhetta.

On November 25, 2018 Matthieu Pigasse publicly announced the sale of 49% of his shares in le Nouveau Monde - to the Czech billionaire Daniel Křetínský.

Groupe Le Monde's headquarters, designed by Snøhetta

In July 2019, Daniel Kretinsky and Matthieu Pigasse announced that they had entered into exclusive negotiations with PRISA to buy the 20% held by the Spanish company.

A decision which provoked the anger of Xavier Niel and of the editorial staff of Le Monde.

In July 2020, Groupe Le Monde announced that it had it had made a net profit of 2.6 million euros.

== Capital ==
The group is controlled by the company Le Monde Libre, which possesses 72.5%. This company is controlled in equal shares by Le Nouveau Monde (Matthieu Pigasse and Daniel Kretinsky), NJJ Presse (Xavier Niel) and Berlys Media (Madison Cox), who each possess 26.66% of the shares, the 20% remaining belonging to the Spanish media group Prisa.

The independence pole, composed notably of several different societies of employees (such as the society of editors of Le Monde), the society of readers of Le Monde, and the association of minority shareholders, controls 25.5% of the group, yet retains a Society of editors of Le Monde and of the publications of the group, of the society of readers of Le Monde. This pole has held since 2019 the right to approve changes to the shareholders.

== Holdings ==
Groupe Le Monde owns L'Obs, Courrier international, Le Monde diplomatique, Manière de voir, La Vie, Le Monde des religions, Prier, Danser, Télérama and other publications.
