= La Tribune =

French financial newspaper

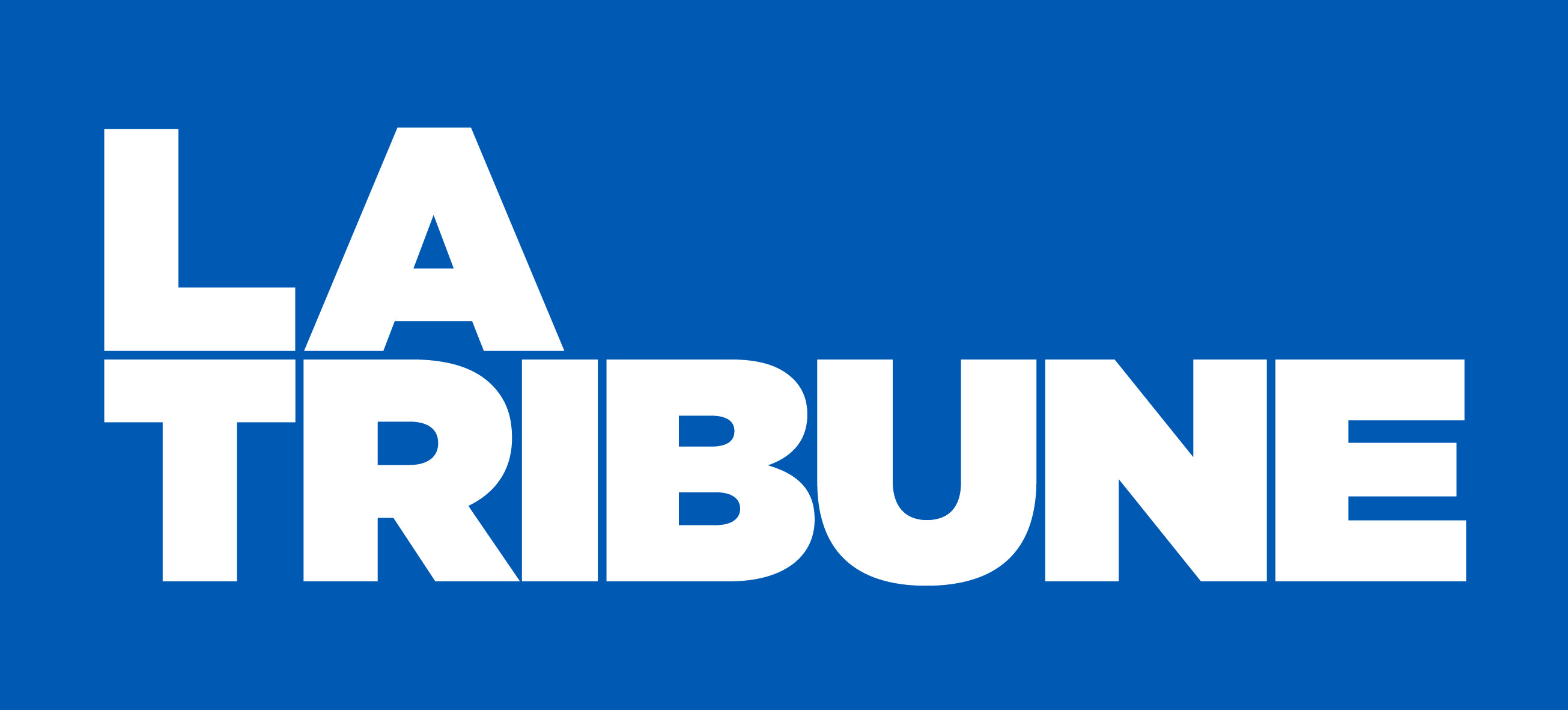
- Type: Weekly newspaper
- Format: Berliner
- Owner(s): CMA CGM, Rodolphe Saade
- Founder: Bruno Bertez
- President: Jean-Christophe Tortora
- Editor: Jérôme Cristiani
- Founded: 1985; 41 years ago
- Language: French
- Headquarters: Paris, France
- Circulation: 531,000
- Website: www.latribune.fr

La Tribune (French pronunciation: [la tʁiˈbyn]) is a French weekly financial newspaper founded in 1985 by Bruno Bertez. Its main competitor is the French newspaper Les Échos, which is currently owned by LVMH.

From 1993 to 2007, La Tribune was part of LVMH. In 2010, Alain Weill, the chairman and CEO of NextRadioTV, sold 80% of La Tribune to Valérie Decamp for €1 and he still owns 20%.

In 2000, it had a circulation of 531,000 copies. In 2008, it switched from tabloid to berliner format. It was rescued from bankruptcy in 2011. In 2012, the newspaper switched to a weekly.

In 2016, it launched its Africa focused website and monthly publication called La Tribune Afrique.

In 2023, La Tribune launched La Tribune Dimanche, a Sunday newspaper, during the decline of newspaper sales in France.

== State aid ==
In 2003 and 2010, the newspaper received state subsidies in a sum of 2.53 million euros.

== Former journalists ==
- Tariq Krim
- Jean Boissonnat
- Éric Fottorino
- Guy-André Kieffer
- Érik Izraelewicz
- Pascal Riché

== See also ==
- French newspapers
- Economics
- Les Échos
