= Jacques Lesourne =

French economist (1928-2020)

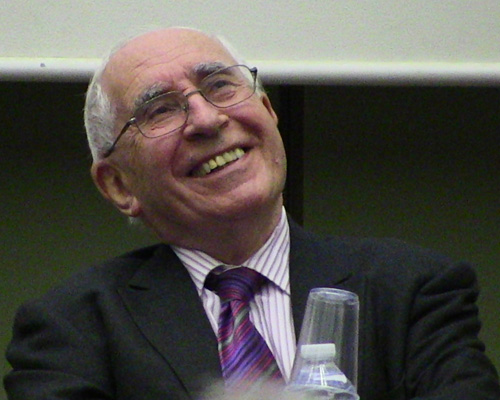
- Lesourne in 2011
- Born: 26 December 1928; La Rochelle, France
- Died: 1 March 2020 (aged 91); Paris, France
- Occupation: Economist

Jacques Lesourne (26 December 1928 – 1 March 2020) was a French economist who was the director of the daily newspaper Le Monde from 1991 to 1994.

== Biography ==
Lesourne studied at the École Polytechnique and Mines ParisTech. His most notable professor was Maurice Allais, a Nobel Prize winner.

Lesourne was head of economic services at Charbonnages de France from 1954 to 1957 and managing director at Groupe Sema from 1958 to 1975. He was the director of the Interfuturs project at the OECD from 1976 to 1979 and an economics professor at the Conservatoire national des arts et métiers (CNAM) from 1974 to 1998. He was a member of X-Démographie, économie, population until 1997, and was a founding member of the French Academy of Technologies in 2000. He also chaired Futuribles International.

Lesourne published numerous books on economics and foresight. His first economic works were Technique économique et gestion industrielle (1958) and Le calcul économique (1964).

He ran Le Monde from 1991 to 1994. He became an Officer of the Legion of Honour on 31 December 2008. He was appointed to the Board of the Centre d'Etudes Prospectives et d'Informations Internationales on 6 November 2010.

Jacques Lesourne died on 1 March 2020 at the age of 91.

== Works ==
- Technique économique et gestion industrielle (1958)
- Le Calcul économique (1964)
- Modèles de croissance de l'entreprise (1972)
- Une nouvelle industrie, la matière grise (1973)
- Les Systèmes du destin (1976)
- Les Mille Sentiers de l'avenir (1981)
- Éducation et société (1988)
- L'Après-Communisme avec Bernard Lecomte (1990)
- L'Économie de l'ordre et du désordre (1991)
- Le modèle français, grandeur et décadence (1998)
- Un Homme de notre siècle (2000)
- Prospective stratégique d'entreprise : de la réflexion à l'action (2001)
- Leçons de microéconomie évolutionniste (2002)
- Démocratie, marché, gouvernance : quels avenirs ? (2004)
- Les Crises et le xxie siècle (2009)
- La Recherche et l’Innovation en France (2009)
- L'Humanité face au changement climatique (2009)
- L'Europe à l'heure de son crépuscule ? (2014)
- Les Chemins de l'avenir, une approche pragmatique. Les humains, les États, le monde (2017)
