= Alain Frachon =

French journalist (born 1950)

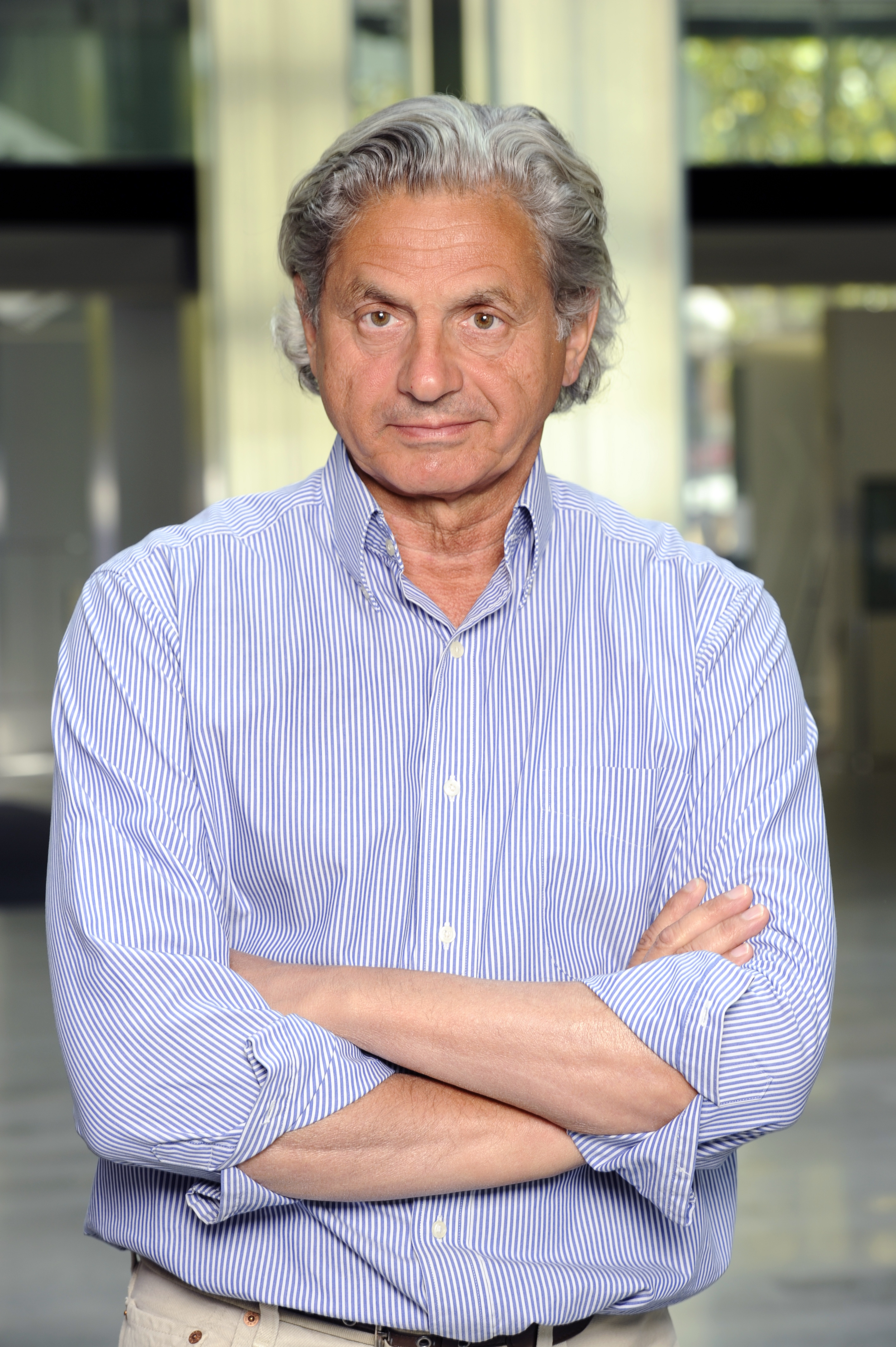
- Alain Frachon in 2011
- Born: 1950 (age 75–76); France
- Education: Centre de Formation des Journalistes
- Occupation: Journalist

Alain Frachon (born 1950) is a French journalist for Le Monde, France's centre-left newspaper of record, and the author of several books.

== Early life ==
Alain Frachon was born in 1950. He graduated from the Centre de Formation des Journalistes (CFJ) in 1974.

== Career ==
Frachon began his career at the Agence France-Presse, where he worked from 1975 to 1985. He was a foreign correspondent for Le Monde in Jerusalem and Washington, D.C. He succeeded Érik Izraelewicz as the interim editor-in-chief from November 2012 to March 2013.

Frachon is the author of several books.

== Selected works ==
- Frachon, Alain; Vernet, Daniel (2004). L'Amérique messianique : Les Guerres des néo-conservateurs. Paris: Le Seuil. ISBN 9782020631570. OCLC 645844043.
- Frachon, Alain; Vernet, Daniel (2012). La Chine contre l'Amérique : le duel du siècle. Paris: Grasset. ISBN 9782246785651. OCLC 939846222.
