= La Vie (magazine) =

French Roman Catholic magazine

- Editor: Jean-Pierre Denis
- Categories: Newsmagazine
- Frequency: Weekly
- Circulation: 74,018 (2020)
- Publisher: Malesherbes Publications
- Founded: 1924
- Company: Groupe La Vie-Le Monde
- Country: France
- Based in: Paris
- Language: French
- Website: www.lavie.fr
- ISSN: 0151-2323

La Vie (French pronunciation: [la vi]) is a weekly French Roman Catholic magazine, edited by Malesherbes Publications, a member of the Groupe La Vie-Le Monde.

== History ==
Founded in 1924, by Francisque Gay as La Vie catholique (Catholic Life), the magazine was renamed La vie in 1977. In 1945, the magazine appeared as La Vie catholique illustrée, as the postwar period placed a great importance on visual magazines (compare Life Magazine in the US). The magazine was originally targeted at active laity through parish promotions, before eventually being sold on newsstands from 1976.

Its editors in chief were Georges Hourdin, José de Broucker, Jean-Claude Petit, Max Armanet and Jean-Pierre Denis .

Since 1945, the magazine was published by le groupe de presse La Vie catholique, which in 2003 became a part of the larger Groupe La Vie-Le Monde.

In 2001, La Vie created a charitable association which as of 2006 had around three thousand members, based in fifty-odd regional centres across France, called Les Amis de La Vie (Friends of La Vie). This organisation gave deeper meaning to the magazine's tagline, "a paper written with its readers", by organising meetings, debates, and summer programmes.

The publication is independent of the Catholic hierarchy. Because the group to which the paper belongs was bought by Pierre Bergé, an LGBT advocate and media tycoon, the publication expressed support or neutrality over gay marriage in France, amidst pressure from the said owner.

== Organisation of the magazine ==
La Vie is composed of three main components each week:

- An in-depth report, generally on the topic of a current event and composed of investigations, analysis, and different points of view.
- Five main rubrics
  - Lifestyle
  - The world in movement
  - Religion and Spirituality
  - Culture
  - Television
- A detachable file called "the essentials", which covers a cultural or spiritual topic (not necessarily Christian)

Beyond this, one page is reserved for an interview with a celebrity and the psychoanalyst Gérard Miller.
