= Hubert Beuve-Méry =

French journalist and newspaper editor (1902–1989)

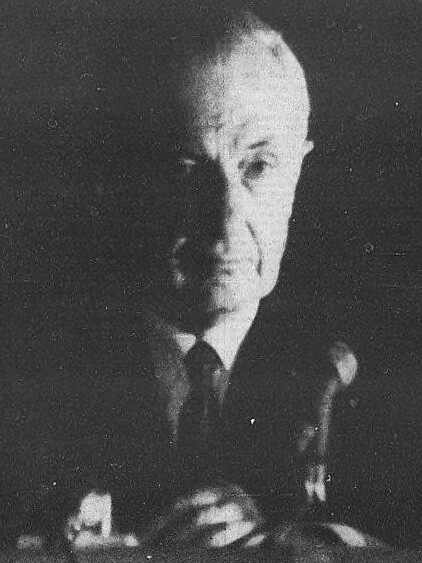
- Beuve-Méry in 1969
- Born: 5 January 1902; Paris, France
- Died: 6 August 1989 (aged 87); Fontainebleau, France
- Resting place: Montparnasse Cemetery
- Occupation: Journalist
- Known for: Founder of Le Monde

Hubert Beuve-Méry (5 January 1902 – 6 August 1989) was a French journalist and newspaper editor who was born in Paris and died in Fontainebleau. Before the Second World War, he was associated with the Vichy regime until December 1942, when he joined the Resistance. In 1944, he founded Le Monde at the behest of Charles de Gaulle. Following the liberation of France, Beuve-Méry built Le Monde from the ruins of Le Temps by using its offices, printing presses, masthead and those staff members who had not collaborated with the Germans.

== Biography ==
He retired his editorship in 1969 being succeeded by Jacques Fauvet. He retained an office at the Le Monde building, however, until his death at age 87 at his home in Fontainebleau, near Paris.

In 2000, he was named a World Press Freedom Hero by the Vienna-based International Press Institute.
