= Jérôme Fenoglio =

French journalist

- Born: 2 June 1966 (age 59); Toulon, France
- Occupation: Editor-in-chief
- Employer: Le Monde

Jérôme Fenoglio (born June 2, 1966) is a French journalist. He serves as the editorial director of Le Monde.
