= Éric Fottorino =

French journalist and writer (born 1960)

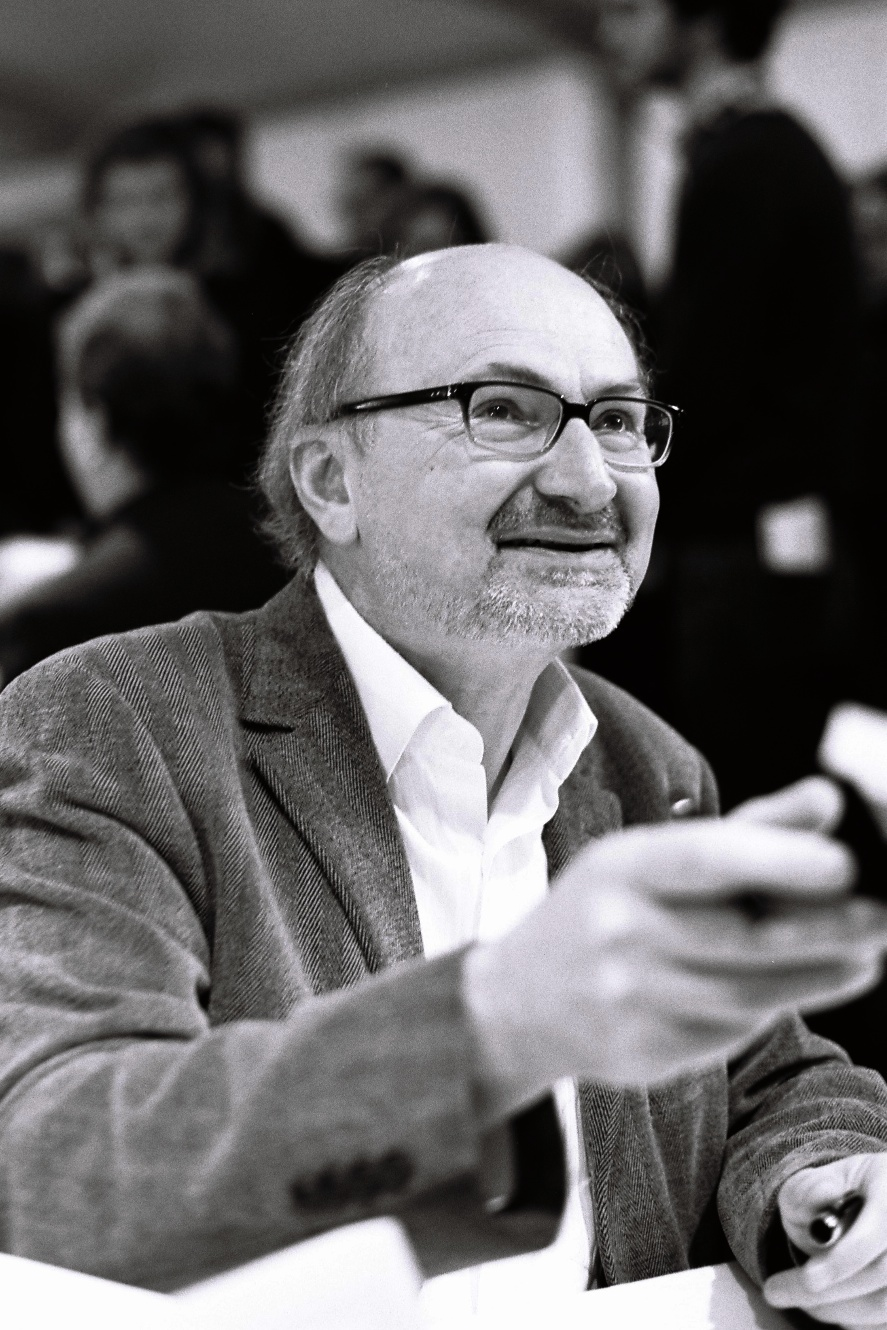
- Fottorino in 2011
- Born: 26 August 1960 (age 66); Nice, France
- Occupations: Author, Journalist
- Writing career
- Notable work: Baisers de cinéma Korsakov
- Notable awards: Prix Femina

Éric Fottorino (born 26 August 1960) is a French journalist and writer. He is the winner of the Prix Femina, 2007, for Baisers de cinéma. After having been a reporter for the daily newspaper Le Monde, then becoming editor-in-chief and executive editor, he was appointed president of the directory group of the La Vie-Le Monde group in January 2008. He was removed from this latter office in December 2010.

== Early life and education ==
Éric Fottorino was born on 26 August 1960. His biological father, Maurice Maman, was of Moroccan-Jewish origin and was a gynaecology student when he met his mother. The ultra-Catholic family of his mother, Monique Charbrerie, was opposed to their marriage. The young Eric was raised without his father. When he was 9, his mother married Michael Fottorino, a physiotherapist, Eric took the surname Fottorino.

He studied at the Faculty of Law at the University of La Rochelle and then at the Institut d'études politiques de Paris.

== Career ==
In 1984, after completing his studies, Fottorino started as a freelance reporter for Libération and La Tribune de l'économie.

He joined the daily newspaper Le Monde in 1986, initially as a news desk editor, tracking records of incoming source material, eventually moving on to work with agricultural and African source material. He then became a reporter (1995-1997) before becoming editor-in-chief in 1998, then a chroniqueur (a journalist who writes as a specialist in a particular domain) in 2003.

After preparing a new format of Le Monde, launched in November 2005, he was appointed as the director of publication in March 2006.

In June 2007, after the ousting of Jean-Marie Colombani following the negative vote of the Society of Le Monde Editors (Société des rédacteurs du Monde or SRM), he was elected director of the journal after receiving over 60% of the votes.

On 19 December 2007, he resigned from his position, along with two other board members of the La Vie-Le Monde group, Pierre Jeantet and Bruno Patino, due to financial disagreements with the Society of LeMonde Editors (SRM). In a statement to France Inter, he accuses the SRM of "playing the roles of both arsonist and firefighter" calling into question the group's strategy.

On 4 January 2008, when Pierre Jeantet and Bruno Patino confirmed their resignations, Fottorino decided not to resign after all.

On 5 January 2008, in the newspaper's editorial, he explained that he went back on his decision so as not to add another crisis on top of the current one. He also presented himself as a candidate for the post of president of the directory group of the La Vie-Le Monde group, with the support the Editor's Group (SRM), initially for a term of six years. Newly emboldened, he then decided to apply for a full term of ten years, to prevent Alain Minc, the chairman of the supervisory board, from appointing a provisional president.

After a first provisional refusal of his application on 14 January, he was finally elected president of the directory group on 25 January 2008, succeeding Pierre Jeantet. On 15 December 2010, he was dismissed by the supervisory board of Le Monde.

=== Other activities ===
Between 1992 and 1995, Fottorino was a lecturer at the Institut d'études politiques de Paris (the Political Studies Institute of Paris).

An experienced amateur cyclist, Fottorino participated in the Grand Prix du Midi Libre in 2001, a mid-mountain cycling event (organized at the time by the La Vie-Le Monde group), an experience he recounts in his books Je pars demain and Petit éloge de la bicyclette.

Fottorino is also known as a novelist and essayist, having received numerous awards for his work, including the Prix Europe and the Prix des Bibliothécaires for Un territoire fragile (2000), the Prix François Mauriac from the French Academy for Caresse de rouge (2004), and the Prix Femina for Baisers de cinéma (2007).

On 14 June 2009, he was interviewed by Catherine Ceylac in the show "Thé ou café" (Tea or coffee) for the television station France 2, whose website states: "to celebrate the release of 100 récits exceptionnels - Le Monde - les grands reportages 1944 – 2009 (100 outstanding accounts – LeMonde - major stories 1944 – 2009) published by Éditions Les Arènes and of L'homme qui m'aimait tout bas published by Gallimard. Additional information: the book À chacun son défi published by Éditions Solar."

== Bibliography ==
- 1988 : Le Festin de la terre, Lieu commun, 1988, ISBN 978-2-86705-100-5
- 1989 : La France en friche
- 1991 : Rochelle
- 1992 : Besoin d'Afrique
- 1993 : L'Homme de terre
- 1994 : Les Éphémères
- 1996 : Aventures industrielles
- 1998 : Cœur d'Afrique (Prix Amerigo Vespucci)
- 1999 : Nordeste; Gallimard, 2008, ISBN 978-2-07-034436-9
- 2000 : Un territoire fragile; Gallimard, 2009, ISBN 978-2-07-034437-6 (Prix Europe 1 et le Prix des Bibliothécaires)
- 2001 : Je pars demain
- 2003 : C'est mon tour
- 2004 : Caresse de rouge (Prix François Mauriac from the French Academy)
- 2004 : Korsakov (Prix des libraires and Prix France Télévisions)
- 2005 : Le Tiers sauvage
- 2005 : Lire tue, avec Nicolas Vial
- 2007 : Baisers de cinéma Gallimard, 2007, ISBN 978-2-07-078584-1 (Prix Femina)
- 2007 : Petit éloge de la bicyclette
- 2009 : L'Homme qui m'aimait tout bas, Gallimard, 2009, ISBN 978-2-07-012463-3
- 2010 : Questions à mon père
- 2010 : Paris Plages : De 1900 à aujourd'hui
