= Érik Izraelewicz =

French journalist and author

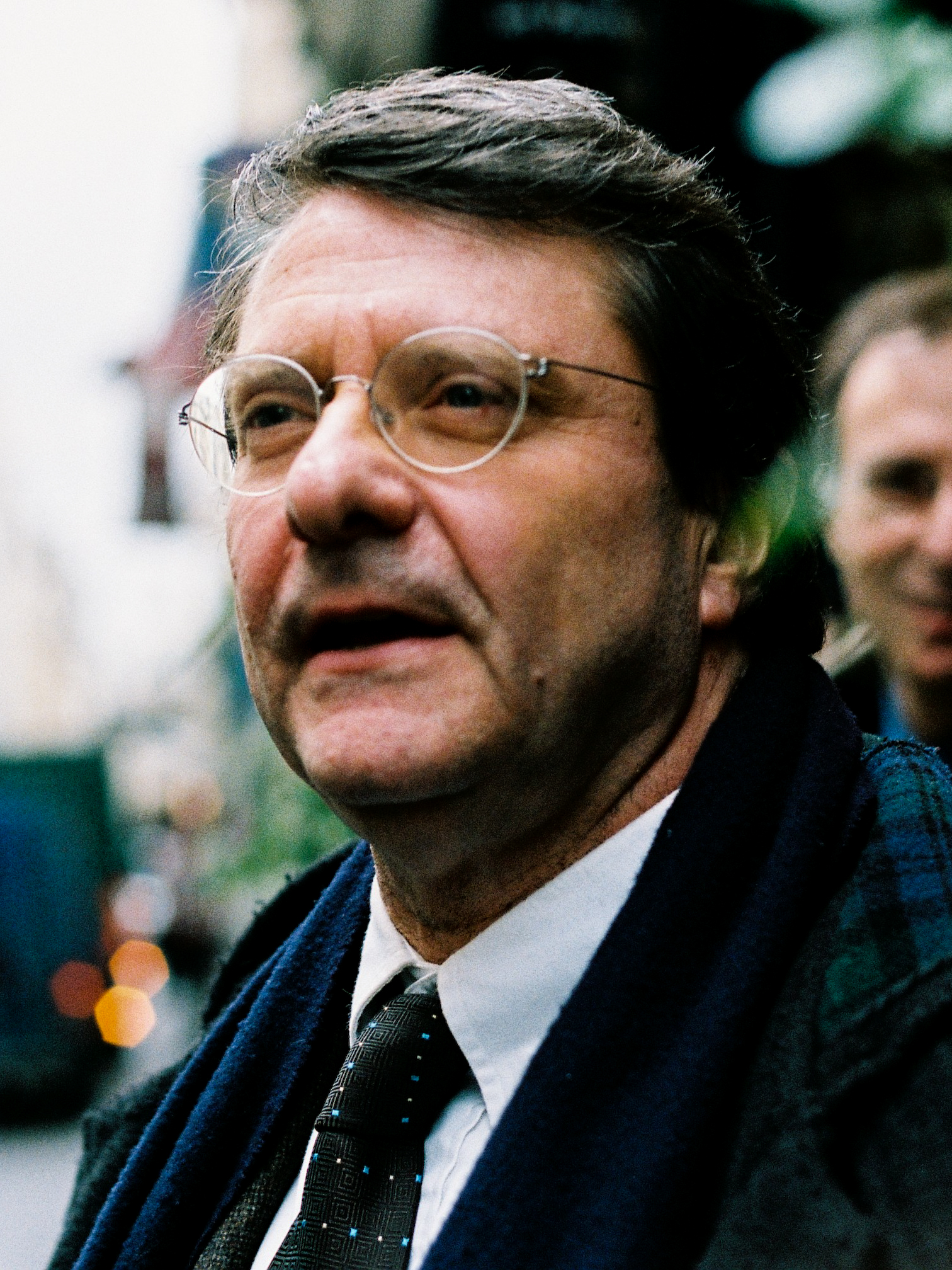
- Izraelewicz in 2009
- Born: 6 February 1954; Strasbourg, France
- Died: 27 November 2012 (aged 58); Paris, France
- Education: HEC Paris
- Occupations: Journalist and author
- Notable credit: Le Monde

Érik Izraelewicz (6 February 1954 – 27 November 2012) was a French journalist and author, specialised in economics and finance. From February 2011 he was director and editorial executive of the daily Le Monde, after having held the same position at the financial daily newspapers Les Echos and La Tribune.

== Life and career ==
=== Early life and education ===
Izraelewicz was born in Strasbourg, France, of Polish-Jewish parentage, and spent part of his early life in Haguenau, where his father worked as a physician. He attended the lycée Robert Schumann in Haguenau and lycée Kléber in Strasbourg. In 1976 he finished the École des hautes études commerciales (HEC) in Jouy-en-Josas. After that, he studied at the Centre de formation des journalistes (CFJ) for two years, and at the Sorbonne in Paris. He completed his studies in 1979 with a doctorat in international economics, with a thesis about "La Division internationale socialiste du travail à l′intérieur du bloc CAEM (Conseil d′assistance économique mutuelle)".

=== Career ===
Izraelewicz started his career as a journalist specialising in economics and finance at the weekly L′Usine nouvelle, in 1981 he joined L′Expansion. In 1985 he co-founded the financial daily La Tribune de l′économie, later La Tribune. In April 1986 he started working at the economics desk of Le Monde, where he covered French finances, banks and insurances, and became its head in September 1989. From 1993 till 1994 he was Le Monde's correspondent in New York City, in 1996 he became chief editor. He left Le Monde in January 2000 to become managing editor of the financial daily Les Echos, becoming its director in 2007. He left Les Echos in February 2008, after having opposed the newspaper being sold to the LVMH group headed by Bernard Arnault, and joined La Tribune as director, shortly after the newspaper was bought by businessman Alain Weill, who sold the unprofitable paper in May 2010. In July 2010 Izraelewicz left La Tribune, and in January 2011 he applied for the position of director of Le Monde. On 7 February 2011 he was appointed director, on 10 February 2011 his appointment was confirmed by the journalists of the newspaper with 74%.

Izraelewicz collapsed from a heart attack while working in his newspaper office. Efforts to revive him were unsuccessful, and he was pronounced dead at a Paris hospital, aged 58.

== Quotes ==
"I don't consider myself an economist. I am first and foremost a journalist, an economical journalist. I came to economics through journalism".

In a front-page article of Le Monde, Izraelewicz portrayed the flaws of the Olympic Games in Atlanta in July 1996 as a reflection of the negative aspects of American society, writing: "A megalomaniacal America. An America enslaved by technology. An America ruled by money", and he quoted a member of the International Olympic Committee as saying: "It is our fault. We should not have handed over the Olympic Games to private enterprises because their sole aim is to make money".

== Publications ==
=== Books ===
- Deux siècles de révolution industrielle. Un dossier de L′Expansion with Philippe Lefournier, Claude Barjonet, Jacques Fontaine, et al. (Hachette, 1983) ISBN 2-01-009740-8
- Paul Claudel, «La crise». Correspondance diplomatique, Amérique 1927–1932. Présentation par Erik Izraëlewicz (Métailié, 1993) ISBN 2-86424-160-9 Google books
- Ce Monde qui nous attend, les peurs françaises et l'économie (Grasset, 1997) ISBN 2-246-54101-8 Google books
- Le Capitalisme zinzin (Grasset, 1999) ISBN 2-246-58391-8 Google books
- Monsieur Ni-Ni, l′économie selon Jospin, with Christine Mital (Robert Laffont, 2002) ISBN 2-221-09360-7 Google books
- Quand la Chine change le monde (Grasset, 2005) ISBN 2-246-65821-7; (Le Livre de Poche, 2005) ISBN 2-253-11487-1 Internet Archive
- Ce que la crise a changé. 60 personnalités imaginent le monde de demain (Arnaud Franel, 2009) ISBN 978-2-89603-263-1 Google books
- L'Arrogance chinoise (Grasset, 2011) ISBN 978-2-246-78396-1 Google books

=== Articles ===
- France's New Capitalists. Foreign Policy, 1 November 2000

== Awards ==
In 1999, Izraelewicz received the first Prix du livre d'économie for "Le Capitalisme zinzin", in 2005 he received the Prix Aujourd'hui for "Quand la Chine change le monde", and in 2011 "L'arrogance chinoise" was awarded the prix lycéen «Lire l'Économie».
