= Jacques Fauvet =

French journalist and newspaper director

- Born: Jacques Jules Pierre Constant Fauvet; 9 June 1914; Paris, France
- Died: 1 June 2002 (aged 87); Paris, France
- Occupation(s): Journalist, newspaper editor
- Known for: Director of Le Monde (1969–1982)
- Spouse: Claude Decroix
- Children: 5

Jacques Fauvet (9 June 1914 – 1 June 2002) was a French journalist who served as director of the daily newspaper Le Monde from 1969 to 1982.

== Early life ==
Fauvet was born in Paris and studied law before beginning his journalism career with L'Est républicain in Nancy. He served as a tank officer during the Second World War and was captured by German forces in 1940, spending five years as a prisoner of war until liberated in 1945.

== Career at Le Monde ==
Fauvet joined Le Monde shortly after its founding in 1944, becoming chief political correspondent in 1948 and later deputy editor (1958–1963), then editor in chief. In 1969, he succeeded the paper’s founder, Hubert Beuve-Méry, as director. Under Fauvet, Le Monde preserved its austere layout and maintained a left-of-centre editorial stance. He expanded its political coverage and introduced opinion polling, while the newspaper became influential for its analysis of French and international affairs.

Editorially, Fauvet frequently adopted a critical attitude toward the government. He supported decolonisation movements, including Algerian independence, and voiced concern about the concentration of power under the French Fifth Republic. Under his direction the newspaper often critiqued Presidents Georges Pompidou and Valéry Giscard d’Estaing.

In 1980, Fauvet and editorialist Philippe Boucher were prosecuted for allegedly “attacking the authority and independence of the judiciary” after publishing articles that questioned court rulings connected to a political scandal. The scandal involved a reported gift of diamonds from Jean-Bédel Bokassa, then ruler of the Central African Republic, to French president Giscard d'Estaing. The charges, brought by Alain Peyrefitte, the government’s chief law officer, were dropped the following year when a Paris court granted them amnesty without ruling on the case.

Fauvet was also accused in 1976 of attempting to block publication of a book by a former Le Monde journalist that alleged systematic left-wing bias at the paper. His tenure additionally faced financial and managerial difficulties, leading him to step down in 1982.

== Later life and death ==
After leaving Le Monde, Fauvet worked for Radio Monte Carlo, chaired the entrance committee of the École nationale d'administration and later presided over the National Committee for Information and Liberty, created to safeguard civil liberties from new technologies. He died in Paris on 1 June 2002, aged 87, after a fall at his home. He was survived by his wife, Claude Decroix, three sons (one deceased), and two daughters.
