= List of newspapers in France =

Below is a list of newspapers in France.

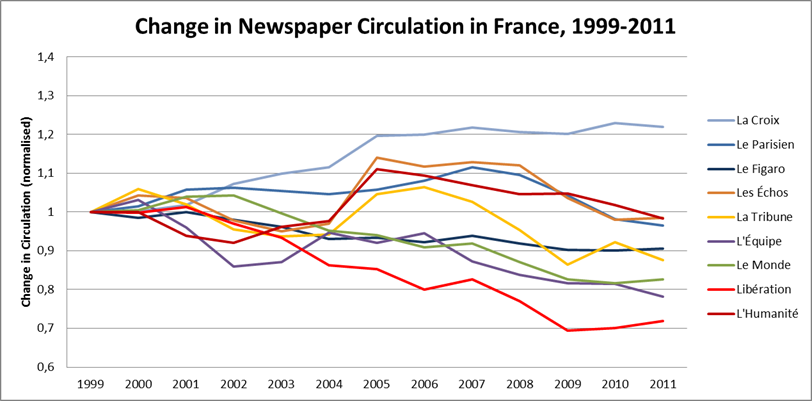
Evolution in circulation, 1999-2011

== National ==
=== Daily ===
Name	Logo	Founded	Circulation	Chief editor	Ideology	Political position	Group	Remarks
La Croix		15 June 1883	89,735 (2023)	Jérôme Chapuis, Anne-Bénédicte Hoffner	Christian democracy	Centre-right	Bayard Presse	Roman-Catholic newspaper founded by the assumptionists
Les Échos		1908	140,679 (2023)	Christophe Jakubyszyn	Neo-liberalism, liberalism	Centre-right	LVMH (Bernard Arnault)	Primarily financial
L'Équipe		1946	219,880 (2023)	Lionel Dangoumau	Sport	Not politically affiliated	Groupe Amaury	Sports newspaper, successor to L'Auto, founded in 1900
Le Figaro		15 January 1826	357,695 (2023)	Robert Mergui	Liberal conservatism, Gaullism, conservatism	Right-wing	Socpresse - Groupe Industriel Marcel Dassault (Dassault Family)	Oldest daily newspaper still in circulation in France
L'Humanité		18 April 1904	38,084 (2023)	Fabien Gay	Socialism, communism	Left-wing	Société nouvelle du journal l'Humanité	Founded by Jean Jaurès, was the organ of the French Communist Party from 1920 to 1994
Libération		18 April 1973	103,218 (2023)	Dov Alfon	Socialism, social democracy	Left-wing	SARL Libération	Founded by Jean-Paul Sartre and Serge July
Le Monde		1944	494,500 (2023)	Jérôme Fenoglio	Social liberalism, social democracy	Centre-left	Groupe Le Monde	Newspaper of record in France. Politically independent, often leans to centre-left views. Le Monde is the only evening newspaper in this list
L'Opinion		2013		Rémi Godeau	Liberal conservatism, Pro-Europeanism, Neoliberalism	Right-wing	Bey Medias Presse & Internet	Most recent national daily newspaper
Le Parisien / Aujourd'hui en France		1944	259,958 (2023)	Nicolas Charbonneau		Centre to centre-right	LVMH (Bernard Arnault)	Popular Parisian newspaper with a national version (Aujourd'hui en France). Circulation figures for both are combined here
Le Petit Quotidien		1998	32,596 (2023)	François Dufour			Play Bac Presse	Newspaper for children aged 6-10
Mon Quotidien		1995	30,480 (2023)	François Dufour			Play Bac Presse	Newspaper for children aged 10-14

Online newspapers

- Mediapart (internet only, investigative journalism, far-left)
- La Tribune (switched to internet only since 2012, economics)
- Slate (center-left)
- Atlantico (right-wing)
- Contrepoints

Free newspapers

- 20 Minutes: The Norwegian group Schibsted launched it in France at the beginning of 2002. It has a circulation of 766,000 in France (over 8 editions), of which 492,000 is in Paris. It has been considered the largest general-interest newspaper in France.

As of 16 October 2022, there is only one free national daily newspaper in France: 20 Minutes, which is often distributed in train stations and other busy areas on Mondays, Wednesdays and Fridays. Other free newspapers such as Direct Matin are now defunct.

=== Weekly ===
- Alternatives économiques (economic and social magazine; left-wing)
- Challenges (business magazine)
- Charlie Hebdo (libertarian, satirical and secular news newspaper; left-wing)
- Courrier International (translated articles from press worldwide; centre-left)
- Le Canard enchaîné (investigative journalism and satirical newspaper; left-wing)
- L'Express (news magazine; centre-right)
- France Dimanche (celebrity news magazine)
- Le Journal du dimanche (cultural, leisure and news magazine; far-right)
- Le Monde Libertaire (anarcho-communist weekly; far-left)
- L'Obs (news magazine; centre-left)
- Le Point (news magazine; right-wing)
- Marianne (secular and sovereigntist news magazine; right-wing)
- Minute (conservative and satirical news newspaper; far-right)
- Paris-Match (headline news and celebrity lifestyle features; independent)
- Télérama (cultural magazine; left-wing)
- Valeurs actuelles (news magazine; far-right)
- VSD (celebrity, leisure and news magazine)

=== Monthly ===
- Le Monde Diplomatique (left-wing to far-left)

=== Every four years ===
- La Bougie du Sapeur (satirical; every February 29)

== English-language ==
- The Connexion
- International New York Times (based in Paris)
- The Local (online)
- Mediapart (English edition)
- Le Monde Diplomatique (translated edition)

== Regional ==
=== Daily ===
- Centre Presse (Aveyron)
- Centre Presse (Vienne)
- Charente Libre (Nouvelle-Aquitaine)
- Corse-Matin (Corsica)
- Dordogne libre (Dordogne)
- Éclair Pyrénées (Pyrénées-Atlantiques)
- France-Guyane (French Guiana)
- France-Antilles (Martinique, Guadeloupe)
- L'Alsace-Le Pays (Alsace, Franche-Comté)
- L'Ardennais (Ardennes)
- L'Écho Républicain (Eure-et-Loir, Yvelines)
- L'Est Républicain (Franche-Comté, Lorraine)
- L'Est-Éclair (Aube)
- L'Éveil de la Haute-Loire (Haute-Loire)
- L'Indépendant (Pyrénées-Orientales, Aude)
- L'Union (Marne, Aisne, Ardennes)
- L'Yonne républicaine (Yonne)
- La Dépêche du Midi (Midi-Pyrénées)
- La Dépêche de Tahiti (French Polynesia)
- La Marseillaise (Bouches-du-Rhône, Alpes-de-Haute-Provence, Var, Vaucluse, Gard, Hérault)
- La Montagne (Auvergne)
- La Nouvelle République des Pyrénées (Hautes-Pyrénées)
- La Nouvelle République du Centre-Ouest (Centre, Poitou-Charentes)
- La Presse de la Manche (Manche)
- La Presse de Guyane (French Guiana)
- La Provence (Provence-Alpes-Côte d'Azur)
- La République des Pyrénées (Nouvelle-Aquitaine)
- La République du Centre (Loiret)
- La Voix du Nord (Nord-Pas de Calais)
- Le Berry Républicain (Centre-Val de Loire)
- Le Bien Public (Côte-d'Or)
- Le Courrier de l'Ouest (Maine-et-Loire, Deux-Sèvres)
- Le Courrier Picard (Picardy)
- Le Dauphiné Libéré (Dauphiné, Savoy)
- Le Havre libre (Seine-Maritime)
- Le Havre presse (Seine-Maritime)
- Le Journal de l'île de la Réunion (Réunion)
- Le Journal de la Haute-Marne (Haute-Marne)
- Le Journal de Saône et Loire (Burgundy)
- Le Journal du Centre (Centre)
- Le Maine libre (Sarthe)
- Le Parisien (Île-de-France, Oise)
- Le Petit Bleu d'Agen (Lot-et-Garonne)
- Le Populaire du Centre (Creuse, Haute-Vienne)
- Le Progrès (Auvergne, Burgundy, Franche-Comté, Rhône-Alpes)
- Le Quotidien de la Réunion (Réunion)
- Le Républicain Lorrain (Lorraine)
- Le Télégramme de Brest (Brittany)
- Les Dernières Nouvelles d'Alsace (Alsace)
- Les Nouvelles Calédoniennes (New Caledonia)
- Libération Champagne (Aube)
- Midi Libre (Languedoc-Roussillon, Midi-Pyrénées)
- Nice-Matin (Provence-Alpes-Côte d'Azur)
- Nord éclair (Nord)
- Nord Littoral (Pas-de-Calais)
- Ouest-France (Brittany, Lower Normandy, Pays de la Loire)
- Paris-Normandie (Normandy)
- Presse-Océan (Pays de la Loire)
- Sud Ouest (Nouvelle-Aquitaine)
- Var-Matin (Var)
- Vosges Matin (Vosges)

=== Weekly ===
- Eure Infos (Eure)
- Journal de la Corse (Corsica)
- L'Abeille de la Ternoise (Pas-de-Calais, Somme)
- L'Action républicaine (Eure, Eure-et-Loir)
- L'Auvergnat de Paris (Île-de-France)
- L'Avenir (Charente)
- L'Aveyronnais (Aveyron)
- L'Éclaireur (Loire-Atlantique)
- L'Écho charitois (Nièvre)
- L'Écho de la Lys (Pas-de-Calais)
- L'Écho de la Presqu'île (Loire-Atlantique)
- L'Écho-Le Régional (Val-d'Oise)
- L'Éclaireur Brayon (Oise, Seine-Maritime)
- L'Éclaireur du Gâtinais (Loiret)
- L'Essor savoyard (Ain, Haute-Savoie, Savoie)
- L'Éveil de Pont-Audemer (Eure)
- L'Éveil hebdo (Haute-Loire)
- L'Éveil normand (Eure)
- L'Hebdo du vendredi (Marne)
- L'Impartial (Eure, Oise)
- L'Indicateur des Flandres (Flanders)
- L'Info éco (Vienne)
- L'Informateur (Seine-Maritime)
- L'Indépendant du Haut-Jura (Jura)
- L'Observateur de Beauvais (Oise)
- L'Observateur de l'Arrageois (Pas-de-Calais)
- L'Observateur de l'Aube (Aube)
- L'Observateur de l'Avesnois (Nord)
- L'Observateur du Cambrésis (Nord)
- L'Observateur du Douaisis (Nord)
- L'Observateur du Valenciennois (Nord)
- L'Opinion Indépendante (Haute-Garonne)
- L'Orne combattante (Orne, Calvados)
- L'Orne Hebdo (Orne)
- La Concorde (Deux-Sèvres)
- La Corse Votre Hebdo (Corsica)
- La Dépêche du pays de Bray (Oise, Seine-Maritime)
- La Gazette de Besançon (Doubs)
- La Gazette de la Loire (Loire)
- La Gazette de la Manche (Manche)
- La Gazette de Montpellier (Hérault)
- La Gazette de Thiers et d'Ambert (Puy-de-Dôme)
- La Gazette du Val d'Oise (Val-d'Oise)
- La Manche libre (Lower Normandy)
- La Marne (Seine-et-Marne)
- La Presse de Gray (Haute-Saône)
- La Presse de Vesoul (Haute-Saône)
- La République de Seine-et-Marne (Seine-et-Marne)
- La Ruche (Haute-Loire)
- La Savoie (Savoie)
- La Semaine dans le Boulonnais (Boulonnais)
- La Semaine de l'Allier (Allier)
- La Semaine des Ardennes (Ardennes)
- La Semaine du Roussillon (Pyrénées-Orientales)
- La Tribune républicaine de Bellegarde (Ain)
- La Vie corrézienne (Corrèze)
- La Vie quercynoise (Lot)
- La Vie nouvelle (Savoie)
- La Voix - Le Bocage (Calvados)
- La Voix du Cantal (Cantal)
- La Voix du Sancerrois (Cher)
- Le Bulletin de Darnetal (Seine-Maritime)
- Le Châtillonnais et l’Auxois (Côte-d'Or)
- Le Confolentais (Charente)
- Le Courrier français (Charente, Charente-Maritime, Dordogne, Gironde, Landes, Lot-et-Garonne, Tarn-et-Garonne, Vendée, Loire-Atlantique, Vienne)
- Le Courrier cauchois (Seine-Maritime)
- Le Courrier de l'Eure (Eure)
- Le Courrier de Mantes (Yvelines)
- Le Courrier des Yvelines (Yvelines)
- Le Courrier du pays de Retz (Pays de Retz)
- Le Courrier du Loiret (Loiret)
- Le Courrier vendéen (Vendée)
- Le Crestois (Drôme)
- Le Démocrate de l'Aisne (Aisne)
- Le Démocrate vernonnais (Eure)
- Le Journal d'Abbeville (Somme)
- Le Journal d'Elbeuf (Eure, Seine-Maritime)
- Le Journal de l'Orne (Orne)
- Le Journal de Civray et du Sud-Vienne (Vienne)
- Le Journal de Ham (Somme)
- Le Journal de Gien (Loiret)
- Le Journal des Flandres (Flanders)
- Le Messager (Haute-Savoie)
- Le Nouvelliste (Haute-Vienne)
- Le Patriote Côte d'Azur (Alpes-Maritimes)
- Le Pays gessien (Ain)
- Le Pays malouin (Ille-et-Vilaine)
- Le Perche (Orne)
- Le Petit Bleu des Côtes d'Armor (Côtes-d'Armor)
- Le Petit Solognot (Cher, Loir-et-Cher, Loiret)
- Le Régional de Cosne (Nièvre)
- Le Réveil de Neufchâtel (Oise, Seine-Maritime)
- Le Réveil du Vivarais (Loire, Ardèche, Isère, Drôme )
- Le Réveil normand (Orne, Eure)
- Le Saint-Affricain (Aveyron)
- Le Trégor (Côtes-d'Armor)
- Les Nouvelles de Falaise (Calvados)
- Liberté Hebdo (Nord)
- Lozère nouvelle (Lozère)
- Mayotte Hebdo (Mayotte)
- Marseille l'Hebdo (Bouches-du-Rhône)
- Oise Hebdo (Oise)
- Réussir le Périgord (Dordogne)
- Toutes les nouvelles (Yvelines)
- La Voix de l'Ain (Ain)
- Voix du Jura (Jura)
- Voix du Midi (Midi)
- wik (Lyon, Metz, Nancy, Nantes, Strasbourg)
- Ya ! (Finistère)

=== Biweekly ===
- La Renaissance - Le Bessin (Calvados)
- Le Pays briard (Seine-et-Marne)
- Les Informations dieppoises (Seine-Maritime)

=== Monthly ===
- Bretons (Morbihan)
- L'Essentiel des Pays de Savoie (Savoie, Haute-Savoie, Isère, Ain)
- Le Mensuel de Rennes (Ille-et-Vilaine)
- Le Peuple breton (Brittany)
- Mémento (Réunion)
- Métropole, le mensuel du Var (Var)
- Normandie Magazine (Normandy)
- Particule (Ille-et-Vilaine)
- Poly (Alsace, Lorraine, Franche-Comté)

=== Bimonthly ===
- Bretagne Magazine (Brittany)

=== Quarterly ===
- L'Anjou
- La Galipote (Auvergne)
- Le Berry
- Le Journal de la Sologne (Centre-Val de Loire)
- Les Saisons d'Alsace (Alsace)
- Le Magazine de la Touraine
- Massif Central (newspaper)
- Patrimoine normand (Normandy)
- Xaintonge, le jhornau des Charentais

== Former newspapers ==
- L'Ami du peuple, founded by Marat
- La Citoyenne, 1881–1891 (feminist)
- La Loi, 1880–1955 (legal)
- Combat, 1944–1974, founded during the Resistance, hosted articles by Camus, Sartre, Malraux
- Le Courrier français, 1884–1914 (conservative)
- Le Journal des débats, 1789–1944 (conservative)
- L'Express du Midi, 1891–1938 (conservative and royalist)
- La Gazette, 1631–1915, first French weekly, founded by Renaudot, became the mouthpiece of the Legitimist monarchists
- Le Globe, 1824–1832, founded by the republican and socialist Leroux, mouthpiece of the Saint-Simonists starting in 1830
- Je suis partout, 1930–1944, far-right newspaper, Collaborationist during the Vichy era
- Le Journal, 1892–1944
- Le Matin, 1884–1944
- Le National, 1830–1851 (liberal, founded by Thiers and Carrel)
- Naye Prese, 1934–1993
- Paris-Soir, 1923–1944
- Le Père Duchesne, 1790–1794, edited by Hébert
- Le Fils du Père Duchêne (other newspapers)
- Le Petit Parisien, 1876–1944
- Le Temps, 1861–1942, compromised by collaboration during Vichy regime, replaced as the newspaper of record by the newly created Le Monde
- La Voix des Femmes, 1848–1852 (feminist)
- La Voix des femmes, 1917-1937 (feminist)

=== German-language ===
- Pariser Tageblatt, 1933-1936 (German-language daily for German exiles in France)
- Pariser Tageszeitung (see Pariser Tageblatt), 1936-1940 (Anti-Hitler daily for expatriates)

=== Ottoman Turkish ===
- Mizan

== See also ==
- History of French newspapers
- History of newspapers and magazines#France
- Media of France
- Online newspaper
- Telecommunications in France
