= Mass media in France =

Compared to other European nations, the French are not avid newspaper readers, citing only 164 adults out of every 1000 as newspaper readers.

A year after the end of World War II, 28 papers had a combined circulation of about 7 million. However, seven years later that figure had been nearly halved. This decline was principally due to the greater popularity of the broadcast media and the subsequent diversion of advertising revenues. Since 2000 newly produced free papers have further weakened the established press. Still, 80 daily papers remain, and there is a wide range of weeklies, many of which now feature internet sites.

Regional papers have remained relatively unaffected by the decline, with provincial newspapers commanding a higher degree of reader loyalty. For example, Ouest-France, sells almost twice as many copies as any of the national dailies.

== Books ==
- Hachette Livre
- Editis

== Newspapers ==
In the early 21st century, the best-selling daily was the regional Ouest-France in 47 local editions, followed by Le Progres of Lyon, La Voix du Nord in Lille, and Provençal in Marseille. In Paris the Communists published l'Humanite while Le Monde and Figaro had local rivals in Le Parisien, L'Aurore and the leftist Libération.

=== Daily newspapers and circulation ===
Below are the circulation figures of France's national daily newspapers from the Alliance pour les chiffres de la presse et des médias

(updated: 30/03/2021)

Title	2020
Le Monde	393,109
Le Figaro	331,927
Le Parisien/Aujourd’hui en France	264,952
L'Équipe	217,068
Les Échos	133,429
La Croix	86,440
Libération	76,522
L'Humanité	37,611

=== Regional daily newspapers ===
Title	Reader circulation (2020)	Publisher	Region of circulation
Le Parisien	180,854	Amaury	Paris, Hauts-de-Seine, Val-de-Marne, Seine-Saint-Denis, Val-d\'Oise, Essonne, Yvelines, Seine-et-Marne, Oise
La Montagne	137,245	Centre-France	Puy-de-Dôme, Cantal, Allier, Haute-Loire, Creuse, Corrèze, Haute-Vienne
La République du Centre	25,381	Centre-France	Loiret, Eure-et-Loir
L'Yonne Républicaine	22,038	Centre-France	Yonne
Le Populaire du Centre	27,098	Centre-France	Haute-Vienne, Corrèze, Creuse
L'Écho Républicain		Centre-France	Eure-et-Loir, Yvelines
Le Berry républicain	24,906	Centre-France	Cher, Indre
Le Journal du Centre	19,771	Centre-France	Nièvre
Le Dauphiné libéré	173,617	EBRA	Drôme, Ardèche, Hautes-Alpes, Isère, Savoie, Haute-Savoie, Vaucluse
Le Progrès	151,697	EBRA	Loire, Rhône, Ain, Jura, Haute-Loire, Saône-et-Loire, Côte-d'Or
L'Est républicain	107,578	EBRA	Doubs, Haute-Saône, Territoire-de-Belfort, Vosges, Meuse, Meurthe-et-Moselle
Les Dernières Nouvelles d'Alsace	126,031	EBRA	Haut-Rhin, Bas-Rhin
L'Alsace-Le Pays		EBRA	Bas-Rhin, Haut-Rhin
Le Journal de Saône-et-Loire	44,795	EBRA	Saône-et-Loire
Le Bien public	33,873	EBRA	Côte-d'Or, Yonne
Vosges-Matin	30,661	EBRA	Vosges
Le Journal de la Haute-Marne	18,420	EBRA	Haute-Marne
La Provence	79,583	Hersant Média	Bouches-du-Rhône, Vaucluse, Alpes-de-Haute-Provence
L'Union	71,539	Hersant Média	Marne, Aisne, Ardennes
Nice-Matin	60,744	Hersant Média	Alpes-Maritimes, Var, Haute-Corse, Corse-du-Sud
Paris-Normandie	38,252	Hersant Média	Seine-Maritime, Eure, Yvelines
Var-matin	42,976	Hersant Média	Var
Corse-Matin	26,066	Hersant Média	Haute-Corse, Corse-du-Sud
L'Est-Éclair	21,718	Hersant Média	Aube
La Dépêche du Midi	120,807	la Dépêche	Lot, Tarn-et-Garonne, Tarn, Gers, Haute-Garonne, Ariège, Aveyron, Aude, Lot-et-Garonne, Hautes-Pyrénées
La Nouvelle République des Pyrénées	8,961	la Dépêche	Hautes-Pyrénées
La Nouvelle République du Centre-Ouest		NRCO	Indre, Cher, Vienne, Deux-Sèvres, Indre-et-Loire, Loir-et-Cher
La Voix du Nord	196,531	Rossel	Pas-de-Calais, Nord
Le Courrier picard	45,323	Rossel	Somme, Oise, Aisne
Nord éclair		Rossel	Nord
Ouest-France	625,896	SIPA - Ouest-France	Calvados, Orne, Manche, Ille-et-Vilaine, Morbihan, Côtes-d'Armor, Finistère, Mayenne, Sarthe, Maine-et-Loire, Loire-Atlantique, Vendée, Paris
Le Courrier de l'Ouest	76,870	SIPA - Ouest-France	Maine-et-Loire, Deux-Sèvres
Le Maine libre	34,804	SIPA - Ouest-France	Sarthe
La Presse de la Manche		SIPA - Ouest-France	Manche
Presse-Océan	22,637	SIPA - Ouest-France	Loire-Atlantique
Sud Ouest	211,197	Sud Ouest	Charente, Charente-Maritime, Dordogne, Gironde, Lot-et-Garonne, Landes, Pyrénées-Atlantiques, Gers
Midi Libre	87,001	Sud Ouest	Hérault, Lozère, Gard, Aude, Pyrénées-Orientales, Aveyron
L'Indépendant	41,386	Sud Ouest	Pyrénées-Orientales, Aude
Charente libre	27,972	Sud Ouest	Charente
La République des Pyrénées	26,115	Sud Ouest	Pyrénées-Atlantiques
Centre Presse	16,268	Sud Ouest	Aveyron
Le Télégramme (de Brest)	177,880	Télégramme	Finistère, Côtes d'Armor, Morbihan
L'Écho du Centre			Haute-Vienne, Corrèze, Creuse, Dordogne avec L'Écho Dordogne, Indre avec la Marseillaise du Berry
L'Éveil de la Haute-Loire	9,076		Haute-Loire
Le Républicain lorrain	86,002		Moselle, Nord de la Meurthe-et-Moselle
La Marseillaise			Bouches-du-Rhône, Gard, Var, Vaucluse

== Television channels ==
The list below does not include Cable and Satellite television channels.

- Main networks
  - TF1 – private
  - Canal+ – private
  - M6 – private
  - France 2 – public
  - France 3 – public
  - France 5 – public
  - Arte – public France/Germany
  - TV5Monde – worldwide broadcast of national programming of francophone countries (France, Swiss, Belgium, Canada) made by Television Suisse Romande, Radio-Canada, RTBF, France 2, France 3, Arte
- 24/7 news channels
  - BFM TV – private
  - CNews – private
  - LCI – private
  - Euronews – private
  - France 24 – public
- Musical Channels
  - D17 – private
  - MCM – private
  - W9 – private
  - MTV France – private
- Others
  - D8 – private
  - TMC – private
  - AB1 – private
  - NRJ 12 – private
  - France 4 – Public
  - La Chaîne parlementaire – the parliamentary channel – political programming (French version of C-SPAN)

== Radio stations in France ==
- BFM
- Chérie FM
- Essentiel Radio
- Europe 1
- Virgin Radio
- Fun Radio (France)
- Nostalgie
- NRJ
- Phare FM
- Radio des autoroutes SANEF
- Radio FG
- Radio France
  - France Inter
  - France Info
  - France Culture
  - France Musique
  - France Bleu
  - FIP (radio)
  - Le Mouv'
- RMC (France)
- RTL
- RTL2
- Skyrock

== See also ==
- Censorship in France
- Culture of France
- History of French journalism
- Observatoire du décolonialisme
- Office de Radiodiffusion Télévision Française
- Open access in France
- Telecommunications in France

== Bibliography ==
- Euromedia Research Group; Mary Kelly; et al., eds. (2004). "France". Media in Europe (3rd ed.). SAGE Publications. pp. 65–77. ISBN 978-0-7619-4132-3.
- Harcourt, Alison (2006). European Union Institutions and the Regulation of Media Markets. London, New York City: Manchester University Press. ISBN 0-7190-6644-1.
