= Robert Hersant =

French newspaper magnate (1920–1996)

Member of the European Parliament
- In office 1984–1996

Personal details
- Born: 30 January 1920 Vertou, France
- Died: 21 April 1996 (aged 76) Saint-Cloud, France
- Resting place: Passy Cemetery
- Party: Radical Party
- Children: Philippe Hersant
- Occupation: Editor

Robert Hersant (French pronunciation: [ʁɔbɛʁ ɛʁsɑ̃]; 30 January 1920 – 21 April 1996) was a French newspaper magnate. He was a leader in the pro-Nazi youth movement during wartime years of collaborationist Vichy France, but after prison time built a major newspaper empire and engaged in conservative politics. At the time of his death, he operated 40 publications and employed 8,000 people, but failed in his leap into television.

== Early life ==
Hersant was born in Vertou, Loire-Atlantique. He was the son of a captain in the merchant navy and showed early on an interest in school newspapers.

== Vichy France ==
Initially involved with the Socialist Youth movement in 1935, Robert Hersant founded the rightist political party Jeune Front in the summer 1940. During that period, he became a friend of Jean-Marie Balestre. Jeune Front although a small group, was publishing the pro-Nazi newspaper Au Pilori. He left this movement in October 1940, to become a member of the secretariat general de la jeunesse of the Vichy Regime. In 1941–1942, he created a camp in Brévannes, named after the Marshal Philippe Pétain to indoctrinate young people in the Révolution nationale ideology. He was not affected in the first waves of the Épuration légale after liberation. He was arrested and jailed for one month in Fresnes on 15 June 1945. He was tried in 1947 and sentenced to 10 years of national indignity for collaboration with Nazi Germany. The court emphasized that Jeune Front had received support from the Nazis as early as August 1940 to justify that sentence.

== Publishing and politics ==
He was released through the general amnesties in 1947, 1951 and 1953. His personal friendships with notable Socialist leaders such as Guy Mollet and François Mitterrand during the 1950s enabled him to start fresh. After launching a few unsuccessful publications, (Bazars et Galeries, l'Equipement Ménager, le Quincailler), in 1950, he started L'Auto-Journal, which met success due to the increasing popularity of automobiles.

In October 1952, he bought la semaine de l'Oise and used it to launch his political career. In February 1953, he was elected mayor of Ravenel, Oise, and in January 1956 he ran for a deputy seat in the Assemblée Nationale as a Radical candidate. He was elected with the support of French Section of the Workers' International (SFIO) and Democratic and Socialist Union of the Resistance (UDSR). However, on 18 April 1956 his election caused a heated debate at the Assemblée Nationale due to his collaborationist past. The Assemblée Nationale cancelled his election, but on 25 October 1956 he was reelected. As a deputy, Hersant championed a reform of the constitution of 1946, altering the articles 45, 46, 47, 48 and 52. It would have permitted the direct election of the Président du Conseil, and would have obliged him to form his cabinet from personalities that did not belong to legislative bodies.

Hersant advocated a partition of Algeria as a solution to the Algerian War. In 1958, Hersant became Gaullist. In 1967, he was elected as a Radical within the Federation of the Democratic and Socialist Left. He then became a conservative supporting Valéry Giscard d'Estaing. He remained a deputy until 1978. In 1984, he became a deputy in the European Parliament on the Rally for the Republic–Union for French Democracy (RPR/UDF) list led by Simone Veil. He remained a European Deputy until his death.

He gradually built his empire by buying or creating local or regional newspapers through his holding company Socpresse (and its associate France-Antilles). In 1957, he created Centre Presse and in 1964, France-Antilles. Robert Hersant also took control of various regional titles such as Le Courrier de l'Ouest, Nord Matin (bought in 1967), Paris Normandie (bought in 1972), Nord Eclair (bought in 1975, and merged with Nord Matin).

In 1975, he purchased from Jean Prouvost the great conservative newspaper le Figaro (with the help of Pierre Juillet and Marie-France Garaud, then adviser of Jacques Chirac), in 1976 the popular daily France-Soir, and in 1980 acquired "L'Aurore" from the estate of Marcel Boussac. At the time, it was rumored that president Giscard d'Estaing had facilitated the obtaining of loans by Hersant in order to have the three Parisian newspapers (totalling 1.06 million in circulation) controlled by a political ally. In 1979, Hersant launched Le Figaro-Magazine, a weekly supplement of Le Figaro, headed by Louis Pauwels. In 1980, Le Figaro absorbed L'Aurore. In 1983, Hersant bought Le Dauphiné Libéré, in 1986, Le Progrès de Lyon and l'Union de Reims, and in 1987 Les Nouvelles Calédoniennes. As a result, in 1986, according to Daniel Singer, he was controlling 38% of the national press, and 26% of the regional press in France.

After the fall of the Berlin Wall, Hersant extended his activities to eastern Europe. In 1991, he bought Magyar Nemzet (Hungary), 51% of Rzeczpospolita (Poland), Tempo, Dziennik Baltycki, Dziennik Lodzki, Trybuna Slaska, Express Ilustrowany, Wieczor Wybrzeza, Dziennik Zachodni and Gazeta Krakowska. This large number of acquisitions gained him the nicknames of Citizen H and Le Papivore in the satirist Le Canard enchaîné. In 1987, he was involved with Silvio Berlusconi in the launching of the La Cinq TV-channel. He withdrew in 1990 after suffering serious losses. La Cinq collapsed in 1992. Robert Hersant's group was, in 1996, employing 8,000 persons, and generating a revenue of 6 billion French francs.

== Death ==
He died at Saint-Cloud in 1996. After his death of Hersant, Socpresse was sold to Serge Dassault.

== List of papers owned by Robert Hersant in 1996 ==
=== France ===
- Le Figaro
- France-Soir
- le Progrès (Lyon)
- le Journal de Saône et Loire
- Le Bien public (Dijon)
- le Courrier de l'Ouest Angers
- le Dauphiné Libéré (Grenoble)
- Presse Océan (Nantes)
- l'Eclair (Nantes)
- Centre presse (Poitiers)
- le Maine libre (Le Mans)
- Le Havre presse
- Le Havre libre
- la Liberté du Morbihan
- l'Union (Reims)
- l'Ardennais
- Nord-Eclair
- Nord-Matin
- Paris-Normandie
- les Dernières Nouvelles d'Alsace
- L'Est Républicain
- l'Est éclair
- Libération Champagne (not to be confused with Libération)
- la Haute-Marne libérée
- France-Antilles Martinique
- France-Antilles Guadeloupe
- la Dépêche de Tahiti
- le Quotidien de la Réunion

=== Belgium ===
- 42% of the capital of Le Soir

=== Poland ===
- One national daily, and one sports daily

=== Czech Republic ===
- One national and four regional dailies

=== Slovakia ===
- two dailies

== See also ==
- Antennes Locales
