= TV Magazine =

Weekly French television listings periodical

- Categories: Listings magazine
- Frequency: Weekly
- Publisher: Groupe Figaro
- Founded: 1987
- Final issue: 31 December 2022
- Company: Groupe Figaro
- Country: France
- Based in: Paris
- Language: French
- Website: tvmag.com
- ISSN: 1252-4794

TV Magazine was a weekly French television listings magazine owned by Figaro Group. As a supplement for the regional press, it was France's leading television listings magazine from 1987 to 2022. TV Magazine became Le Figaro TV Magazine in early 2023, marketed nationally and still owned by the Figaro Group.

== History and profile ==
TV Magazine was started in 1987. The Hersant Group launched TV Magazine as a supplement to French regional dailies.

The magazine was published by Hachette Filipacchi until 2001 when it began to be published Quebecor World Inc.

In 2007, the magazine had 14 million readers.

At the end of November 2008, Socpresse (publishing TV Magazine) and Lagardère Médias (publishing TV Hebdo) signed an agreement to merge the two weekly supplements of the daily press. Socpresse was the majority shareholder of the new entity that was TV Magazine.

It was part of the Figaro Group. In 2018, TV Magazine circulated 4.3 million copies per week.

In March 2019, it was expanded by ten additional pages. Published by the Figaro Group and distributed every Sunday with fifty titles from the regional press and Le Figaro, TV Magazine employed 38 people, including 17 journalists.

At the end of 2022, Le Figaro announced the termination of the contracts with the regional press titles, which ensured the distribution of TV Magazine. As France's leading television listings magazine, its circulation was then 3.7 million copies. The exorbitant manufacturing costs due to rising energy and paper prices determined the renegotiation of contracts between Le Figaro and distributors. This resulted in the loss of fourteen jobs as the producing company of TV Magazine was dissolved. Brice Laemle of Le Monde wrote that the magazine turned an "important page in its history". The final issue of TV Magazine was published in the last week of December 2022.

== Circulation ==
TV Magazine sold four million copies in October 1998. It was the second best-selling television magazine worldwide with a circulation of 4,489,000 copies in 2001. In 2006, the magazine had a circulation of 5,329,711, having suffered a small decline from 5,677,411 copies in 2002. The circulation of the magazine was 5,152,112 copies in 2014.

== Le Figaro TV Magazine ==
At the beginning of 2023, TV Magazine was replaced by Diverto for regional dailies. Diverto is distributed over 3 million copies through the alliance of 50 regional press titles. On 6 January 2023, the remodelled TV Magazine was relaunched as a supplement distributed by the newspapers Le Figaro, Le Parisien and Le Républicain de l'Essonne. Renamed Le Figaro TV Magazine, it is controlled by Le Figaro in partnership with Le Parisien.

Since then, Le Figaro TV Magazine has been marketed nationally by Media Figaro, the Figaro Group's advertising agency, with a circulation of 530,000 copies per week and is one of the top 5 French television listings magazines. The magazine has been distributed on Fridays and Saturdays, within the weekend offer of Le Figaro, Madame Figaro, and Le Figaro Magazine. It is also distributed under Le Parisien TV Magazine in the Friday edition of the daily Le Parisien. The magazine belongs to the same owner, the Figaro Group. The staff writers of Le Figaro TV Magazine and its website are those of the "screen division" of Le Figaro. François Aubel is editor-in-chief of Le Figaro TV Magazine and Le Parisien TV Magazine.

== Other uses ==
TV Magazine is also used in English-speaking countries as a generic name for any television listings magazine.
