= JSL =

JSL may refer to:

- JSL, Joint Station LAN, International Space Station
- JSL S.A., a Brazilian logistic company
- Japanese: The Spoken Language, a Japanese textbook
  - JSL romanization, the romanization system used in the text
- Jamaican Sign Language
- Japanese Sign Language (ISO 639-3: jsl)
- Japan Soccer League
- JMP Scripting Language, a programming language used in the JMP statistical software
- Jonathan Stuart Leibowitz, given name of comedian Jon Stewart
- Journal of Symbolic Logic
- Le Journal de Saône-et-Loire, a French daily newspaper
- Luxembourg Socialist Youths (French: Jeunesses Socialistes Luxembourgeoises), a political youth organization
- JSL, Journal of Slavic Linguistics
