= La Loi =

La Loi may refer to:

- La Loi (newspaper), a daily newspaper published from Paris, France
- The Law (novel) (French: La Loi), a 1957 novel by Roger Vailland
- The Law (Bastiat book) (French: La Loi), an 1850 book by Frédéric Bastiat
- The Law (1959 film) (French: La Loi), a French-Italian film

== See also ==
- The Law (disambiguation)
