= Groupe Figaro =

French media conglomerate

- Type: Private
- Industry: Mass media; Publishing
- Predecessor: Socpresse
- Founded: June 2011; 15 years ago (as Groupe Figaro)
- Headquarters: 23–25 Rue de Provence, Paris, France
- Key people: Éric Trappier (Chairman); Marc Feuillée (CEO)
- Products: Newspapers; Magazines; Websites; Television channels; Radio
- Brands: Le Figaro; Le Figaro Magazine; Madame Figaro; Gala; TV Magazine; Le Particulier; L'Internaute; La Chaîne Météo; Viadeo
- Revenue: €556 million (2025)
- Number of employees: 1,985 (2025)
- Parent: Groupe Dassault
- Website: www.groupefigaro.com

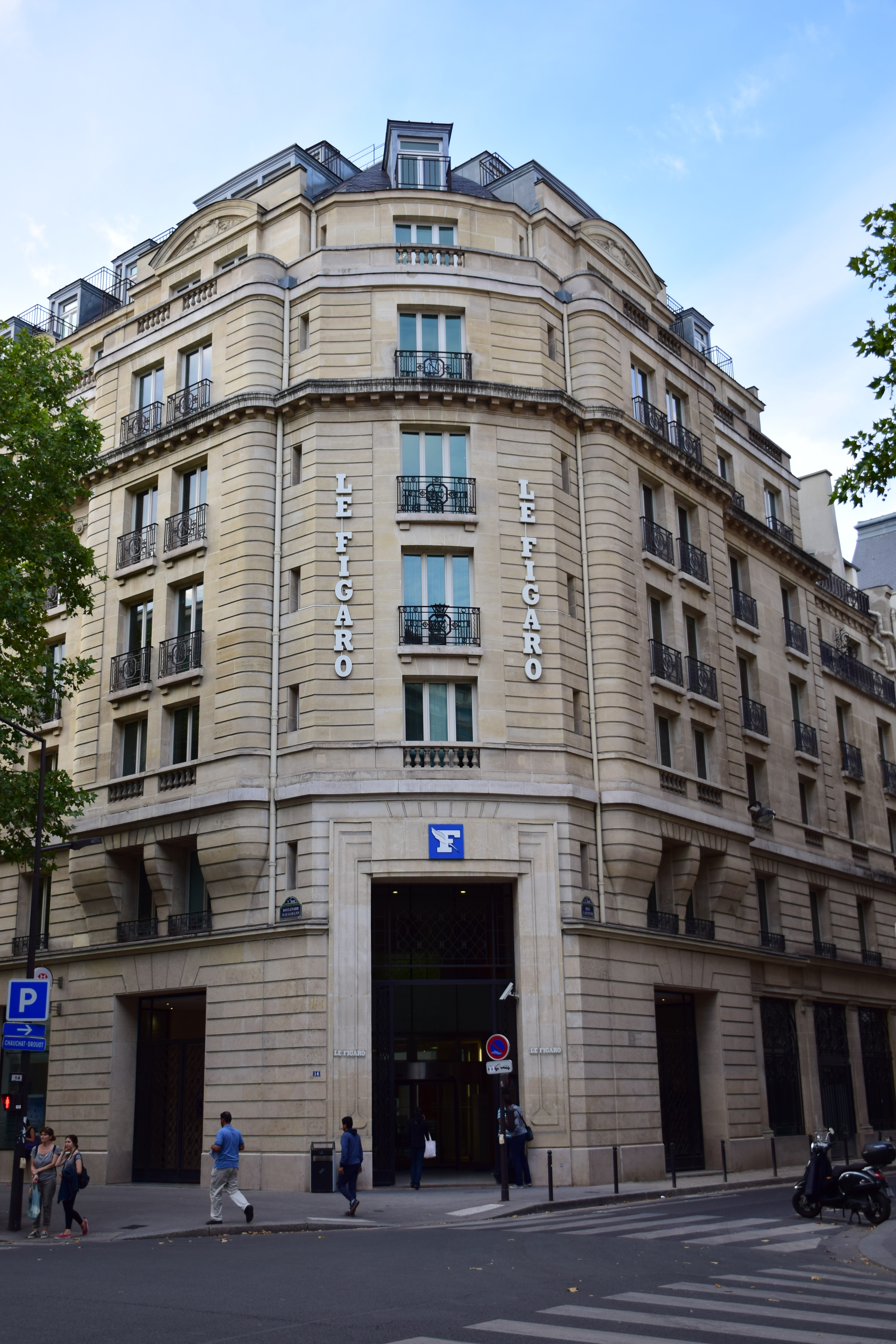
Le Figaro headquarters on Boulevard Haussmann in Paris

Groupe Figaro (French: [ɡʁup fiɡaʁo]) is a French media conglomerate owned by Dassault Group. The company contains some of the core assets of the now extinguished Socpresse that Dassault purchased in 2006. Dassault renamed its press holdings as "Groupe Figaro" in 2011.

== Holdings ==
Groupe Figaro owns Le Figaro, Madame Figaro, TV Magazine, Le Figaro Histoire, Le Figaro Magazine, Figaro Golf, Figaro Santé, Figaro enchères, Figaro nautisme and Figaro Bourse. As of 2016, its revenues were €520 million and it had 1,500 employees.

L'Internaute is a Dassault subsidiary

Groupe Figaro also owns CCM Benchmark Group, which owns L'Internaute, Le Journal des Femmes, and several other publications. In Brazil, it owns the Portuguese-language A Revista da Mulher. In Italy, it owns the Magazine delle Donne.

== Ownership ==
Its ownership by Serge Dassault was long a source of controversy in terms of conflict-of-interest, as Dassault also owned a major military supplier and served in political positions from the Union for a Popular Movement party. His son Olivier Dassault has been a member of the French National Assembly for 18 years, while at the same time holding several positions at Dassault Group and its subsidiaries, including its media subsidiaries. Serge Dassault remarked in an interview in 2004 on the public radio station France Inter that "newspapers must promulgate healthy ideas" and that "left-wing ideas are not healthy ideas."
