= JHM (disambiguation) =

JHM may refer to:

- Kapalua Airport, the IATA code JHM
- Jack Hindon Medal, a South African military decoration
- Jewish Historical Museum, Belgrade, a museum located to the southeast of Kalemegdan, Stari Grad, Belgrade
- Le Journal de la Haute-Marne, a French newspaper
- Journal of Hydrometeorology, a scientific journal published by the American Meteorological Society

== See also ==
- JHM Campbell, an Irish lawyer and politician
