= La Dépêche =

La Dépêche is the name of several newspapers:

- La Dépêche du Midi, commonly known as La Dépêche, a French newspaper based in Toulouse, published 1870–present
- La Dépêche de Brest, a French newspaper based in Brest, 1886–1944
- La Dépêche marocaine, a francophone newspaper published in Morocco 1905–1961
- La Dépêche tunisienne, a francophone newspaper published in Tunisia 1892–1961
- La Dépêche de Tahiti, published in Tahiti 1964–2000
