= Hersant =

Hersant is a surname. Notable people with the surname include:

- Guy Hersant (born 1949), French photographer
- Philippe Hersant (born 1948), French composer
- Philippe Hersant (newspaper publisher) (born 1957), French newspaper publisher
- Robert Hersant (1920–1996), French newspaper publisher
