= Socpresse =

French corporation

Socpresse was a French corporation which controlled the conservative daily newspaper Le Figaro, the weekly magazine L'Express, 40% of the weekly Le Journal du Dimanche, Valeurs Actuelles, and the football club FC Nantes. The company was acquired by the Dassault in September 2006. Before that date, 13% of the shares belonged to Aude Ruettard, the granddaughter of Robert Hersant. After the acquisition, Dassault sold off most of the company, retaining Le Figaro and FC Nantes; in 2011, Dassault renamed its remaining core media assets Groupe Figaro.

In total, the Socpresse group owned about 70 newspapers. A partial list includes:

- Le Bien Public (via Société Delaroche, a fully owned subsidiary)
- Le Maine Libre (via société d'exploitation du Maine Libre, a 99% owned subsidiary)
- Nord Matin (via the 98% owned subsidiary Presse Nord)
- La Voix du Nord, Nord Eclair, Nord Littoral, L'avenir de l'Artois, L'Indépendant du Pas de Calais
- Le Courrier de l'Ouest

Socpresse also owned 27% of the newspaper company Est Républicain, a company that controls La Liberté de l'Est, Le Journal de la Haute-Marne, Dernières Nouvelles d'Alsace, Le Journal de la Haute-Marne. It had a 49% ownership stake in the local TV station TV Nantes Atlantique; and also owns the web sites sport24.com and evene.fr.
