= Philippe Hersant (newspaper publisher) =

French newspaper publisher (born 1957)

Philippe Hersant (French pronunciation: [filip ɛʁsɑ̃], born 1957) is the current leader of Hersant Media Group and the last son of Robert Hersant (1920 -1996), who was nicknamed "papivore" because of his insatiable appetite for buying newspaper and magazine companies.

In the 2000s, due to the considerable debt of the Hersant Media Group, he was forced to sell many titles. In March 2004, he sells Socpresse to Serge Dassault, which already held 30%. In 2005, he also has to sell the 40% stake in Rossel.

== Biography ==
He studied at the École des Roches in Verneuil-sur-Avre (Eure, Upper Normandy).

He pursues the same goals as his father, but in a less media-oriented way. He was trained in the best possible way, working his way up through every position in a daily newspaper (from editorial to printing) before his father entrusted him with the management of Centre Presse (a regional daily newspaper in the Massif Central).

He was previously head of the France-Antilles group (director in 1983, he became CEO in 1985, after the Hersant group was split into two separate legal entities (Socpresse and France-Antilles) in order to circumvent the law on press concentration (the Fillioud-Mauroy law).

With the purchase of Filanosa SA (La Côte, etc.) in Switzerland in July 2001, Philippe Hersant acquired the Société neuchâteloise de presse in Spring 2002, which included the daily newspapers L'Express (Switzerland) de Neuchâtel and L'Impartial de La Chaux-de-Fonds and a printing plant in Neuchâtel. His ultimate aim was to create an influential press group based in French-speaking Switzerland, but first and foremost to exploit the "synergies" between the companies in the two branches of the Hersant group (the various publications in Rhône-Alpes, Savoie, Franche-Comté and Burgundy) and the companies now controlled on Swiss soil, in order to concentrate production where it would be most profitable.

In the 2000s, due to the considerable debt of the Hersant Media group, it was forced to divest or sell many of its titles. In March 2004, it sold Socpresse to Serge Dassault, who already owned 30% and convinced the heirs to break the Shareholders' agreement. In 2005, he also had to sell back to the Groupe Rossel group his 40% stake in the company, which he had purchased in 1987.

In 2011, he filed for bankruptcy for his free newspaper company ParuVendu, formerly Comareg (a group of 280 free classified ad newspapers) and Hebdoprint, his printing center. ParuVendu was the largest redundancy plan in France in 2011 (2,300 people made redundant in one year).

In October 2012, the banks forced him to sell several titles: L'Union (French newspaper), Paris-Normandie, L'Ardennais, L'Est-Éclair, Libération Champagne, and L'Aisne nouvelle.
