= Gala (magazine) =

French women's magazine

- Editor-in-chief: Juliette Serfati
- Categories: Women's magazine Celebrity magazine
- Frequency: Weekly
- Circulation: 158,817 (2020)
- Publisher: Groupe Figaro
- Founded: 1993; 33 years ago
- Company: Groupe Figaro (2023–present)
- Country: France
- Based in: Paris
- Language: French; German; Polish; Russian; Greek
- Website: Gala
- ISSN: 1243-6070

Gala (French pronunciation: [gala]) is a French weekly celebrity and women's magazine published in Paris, France. The magazine also has international editions in various languages.

On 21 November 2023, the magazine was sold to Groupe Figaro as part of Vivendi's efforts to obtain approval from the European Commission for the purchase of a controlling stake in Lagardère Group.

== History and profile ==
Gala was first published in 1993. The magazine is published by Groupe Figaro on a weekly basis. The headquarters of the weekly is in Paris. The editor-in-chief is Juliette Serfati. The magazine provides news on significant figures from entertainment, fashion and society and targets women.

Gala had a circulation of 264,000 copies in France in 2010. In the period of 2013–2014 the circulation of the magazine was 234,175 copies.

As of January 2021, Gala was published in five countries: France, Germany, Greece, Poland and Russia, and over the years released special editions of the magazine: Gala Men, Gala Style and Gala Wedding. The German edition of the magazine was established in 1994 and is published weekly. In Poland, Gala was first published in 2001 and ceased its publication after 20 years in August 2021. Other discontinued editions of the magazine include: Kuwait, Lebanon, Lithuania and Syria.

== Awards ==
The Polish edition of Gala organised an annual awards ceremony called "Róże Gali" (Polish: Gala's Roses) since 2003.
