= La Provence =

French regional daily newspaper

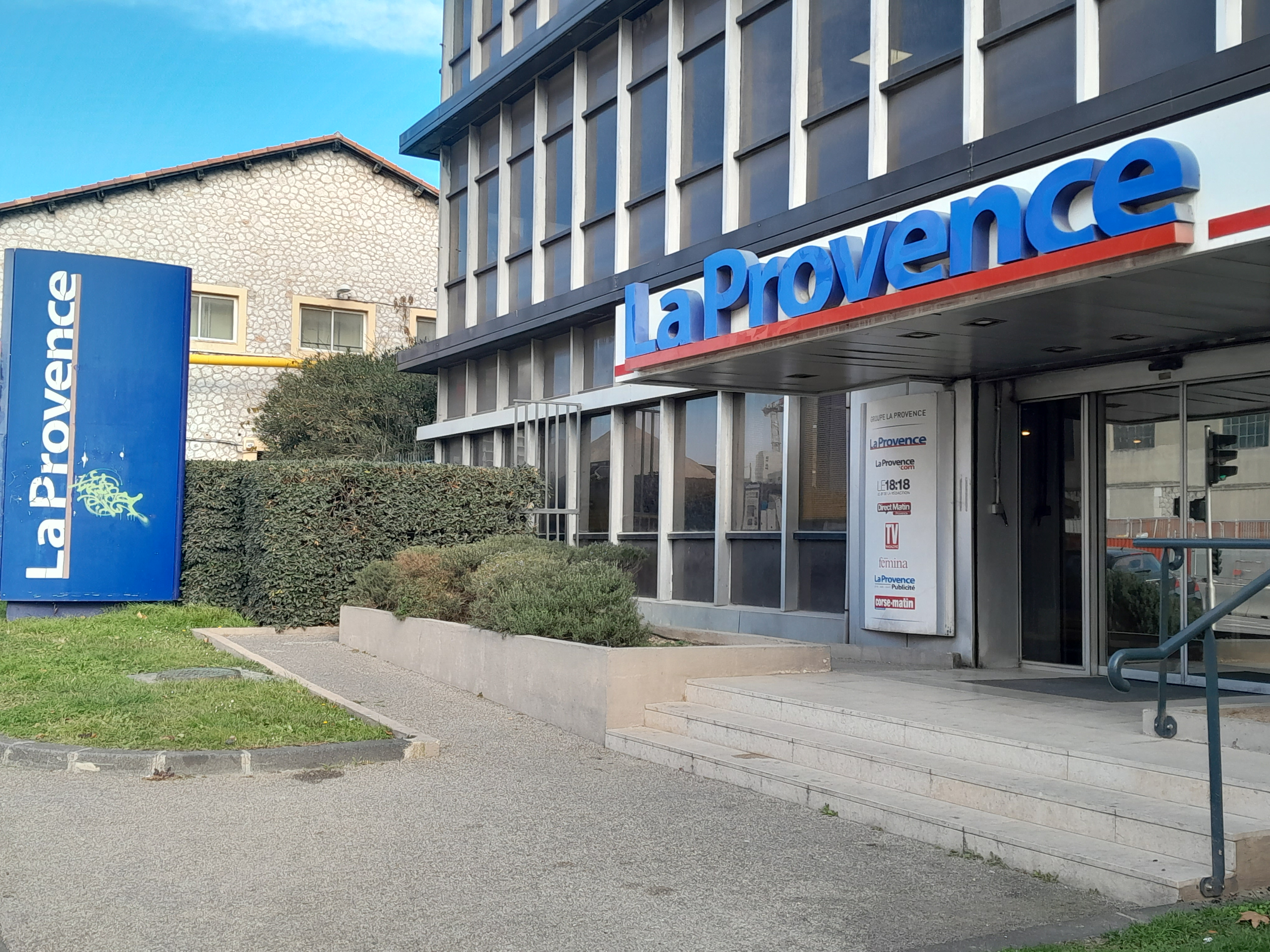
- Former headquarters (seen here in 2023) on Avenue Roger-Salengro
- Type: Daily newspaper
- Format: Berliner
- Owner: Rodolphe Saadé via CMA CGM Médias
- Publisher: Hachette Filipacchi Medias
- Editor: La Provence Group
- Founded: 1997; 29 years ago
- Language: French
- Headquarters: 19 Rue Henri-Barbusse; 1st arrondissement of Marseille, France
- Circulation: 81,858 (2020)
- ISSN: 2102-6815
- Website: laprovence.com

La Provence (French pronunciation: [la pʁɔvɑ̃s], lit. 'Provence') is a French regional daily newspaper published in Marseille.

== History and profile ==
In 1997 La Provence was created in Marseille from the merger of two daily newspapers, Le Provençal of former Interior Minister Gaston Defferre and the Le Méridional of shipowner and congressman, Jean Alfred Fraissinet.

La Provence was jointly owned by the Groupe Hersant Média and the Groupe Bernard Tapie until July 2013 when the latter became the sole owner of the paper. The publisher of the paper is Hachette Filipacchi Medias, a subsidiary of Lagardère.

In 2020, the circulation of La Provence was of 81,858 copies.

== See also ==
- List of newspapers in France
