= L'Internaute =

French news website

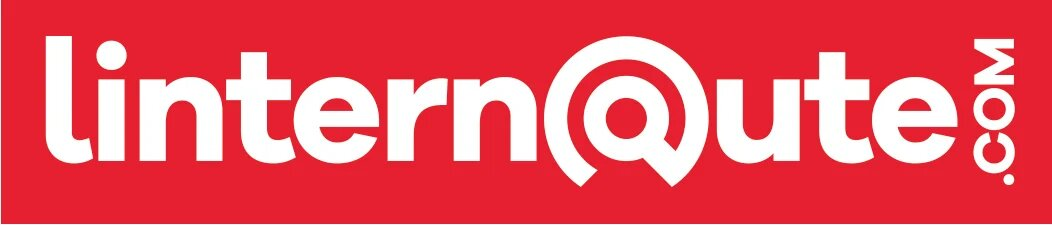
- Website type: News, lifestyle
- Founded: 1 January 2000; 26 years ago
- Owners: Dassault Group, via its subsidiary Groupe Figaro.
- Website: www.linternaute.com
- Current status: Active

Linternaute.com (webified name for L'Internaute or "the internet navigator", pronounced [lɛ̃tɛʁnot]) is a major French news site, launched in 2000 that provides online news. It covers current events in a generalist manner across its various sections through articles on news, culture, and entertainment, spanning a wide range of topics (politics, society, sports, cars, travel, high-tech, DIY, cinema, television, etc.) and offers services such as a dictionary, buying guides or a daily TV program guide. It also includes forums and the social networking site Copains d'avant.

As of November 2020, it was the 99th most visited website in France. The site specializing in fact-checking false information Newsguard ranked Linternaute.com in 2025 as a reliable site, giving it a perfect score of 100/100 with the following note: "This site adheres to the nine criteria of credibility and transparency," including the responsible collection and presentation of information, avoiding misleading headlines, and "not publishing false or grossly misleading content on a repeated basis."

L'Internaute is published by Groupe Figaro.

== School rankings ==
L'Internaute creates its own rankings for school performance, by adjusting French government data with its own coefficients.

== Ownership ==
The site is owned by the Figaro Group / CCM Benchmark Group, ranked fourth Internet group in France with 24 million VUs (Médiamétrie Netratings, January 2017) behind Google, Microsoft and Facebook.

Founded in 1996, Benchmark Group was bought in 2010 by the CCM group (Comment ça marche), resulting in the creation of CCM Benchmark Group, ranking the combined entity as the 5th most visited websites in France. Groupe Figaro acquired CCM Benchmark Group in 2015, in what Le Monde described as "a great move," as Benchmark Group at the time had the 6th largest audience in France, through its properties Comment ca marche, Droit-finances.net, L’Internaute, the Journal des femmes, Le Journal du Net and Copains.

== Audience ==
Per the survey institute Médiamétrie / NetRatings, in January 2017, Linternaute.com is the third news site in France with ten million unique visitors each month. According to the book Search Engine Optimization All-in-One For Dummies, linternaute.com is one of "the most visited sites within France." In 2025, Linternaute.com gathered an average of 14 million monthly visitors, ranking it 13th among media brands in France on the web.

== In print media ==
In 2003, the French book Internet!: surfez, communiquez, trouvez, téléchargez... cited linternaute.com as a gateway site that could help novice internet users make progress in the online world. And in 2007, the book Mieux utiliser internet pour être plus efficace listed first L'Internaute on its list of "best resources on the Internet."

== Acquisition by Groupe Figaro ==
L'Internaute and its parent company were acquired by Groupe Figaro in 2015; with it Groupe Figaro became the largest native French online content provider, thus increasing the concentration of French media under Serge Dassault, long a source of controversy in terms of conflict-of-interest, as Dassault also owned a major military supplier, Dassault Aviation, and served in political positions from the Union for a Popular Movement party. His son Olivier Dassault was a member of the French National Assembly for 18 years, while at the same time holding several positions at Dassault Group and its subsidiaries, including its media subsidiaries. Serge Dassault remarked in an interview in 2004 on the public radio station France Inter that "newspapers must promulgate healthy ideas" and that "left-wing ideas are not healthy ideas."
