= Nice-Matin =

French daily newspaper

- Type: Daily newspaper
- Format: Tabloid
- Owner: Groupe Nice-Matin
- Founders: Michel Bavastro; Michel Comboul
- Publisher: Hachette Filipacchi Médias
- Founded: 1944; 82 years ago
- Language: French
- Headquarters: Nice, France
- Circulation: 62,881 (2020)
- ISSN: 0224-5477
- Website: nicematin.com

Nice-Matin (French pronunciation: [nis matɛ̃]; lit. 'Nice-Morning') is a regional daily French newspaper. The paper covers Nice and the Provence-Alpes-Côte d'Azur region, in south-eastern France.

== History and profile ==
Nice-Matin was created in 1944. The paper was jointly owned by the Groupe Hersant Média and the Groupe Bernard Tapie until July 2013 when the latter reduced its stake to 25% and the former had 75% of the paper. The publisher of the paper is Hachette Filipacchi Medias, a subsidiary of Lagardère. It is published in broadsheet format.

In 2003, Nice-Matin had a circulation of 267,000 copies. In 2019, Nice-Matin had a circulation of 65,987 copies. In 2020, Nice-Matin had a circulation of 62,881 copies.

In October 2025, La Lettre announced that Denis Carreaux would be replaced by Baptiste Bize, director of La Nouvelle République.

Yearly circulation Source : OJD/ACPM
Year	Circulation
2006	118,566
2007	117,679
2008	114,598
2009	110,619
2010	108,826
2011	104,138
2012	98,304
2013	92,107
2014	87,884
2015	82,289
2016	78,681
2017	74,797
2018	70,459
2019	67,367
2020	62,881
