= Le Particulier =

French business Magazine

- Categories: Business magazine
- Frequency: Weekly
- Publisher: Le Particulier Editions SA
- Founder: Michel Druon
- Founded: 1949; 76 years ago
- Company: Figaro Group
- Country: France
- Based in: Paris
- Language: French
- Website: Le Particulier

Le Particulier is a French-language weekly business magazine published by the Figaro Group in Paris, France. The magazine has been in circulation since 1949.

== History and profile ==
Le Particulier was established by Michel Druon in 1949. The magazine was acquired by the Figaro Group in 2009. The group also publishes the daily newspaper Le Figaro and the magazines Le Figaro Magazine and Madame Figaro Magazine. The publisher of Le Particulier is Le Particulier Editions SA, which was also acquired by the Figaro Group on 18 May 2009. The former publisher of the magazine was the Group Express-Expansion.

Le Particulier was published monthly before its frequency was switched to weekly basis. The magazine has its headquarters in Paris.

== Circulation ==
Le Particulier sold 477,000 copies in 2001. Its circulation was 493,000 copies during the 2007-2008 period. In 2010, its circulation was 460,090 copies, making it the best-selling European monthly business magazine. In 2013 the circulation of the magazine was 424,123 copies. Its circulation was 402,767 copies in 2014.
