= Contrepoints =

French online magazine

Contrepoints is a French online magazine founded in 2009. The name of the newspaper is a reference to Contrepoint, a now-defunct newspaper launched by French philosopher Raymond Aron.

According to Le Monde, Contrepoints is one of the most prominent libertarian websites in France. For Pew and Institut Montaigne, the magazine has a center-right classical liberal editorial stance.

Contrepoints was awarded a Templeton Freedom Award by the Atlas Economic Research Foundation in 2012.
