= La Voix du Nord =

French daily newspaper

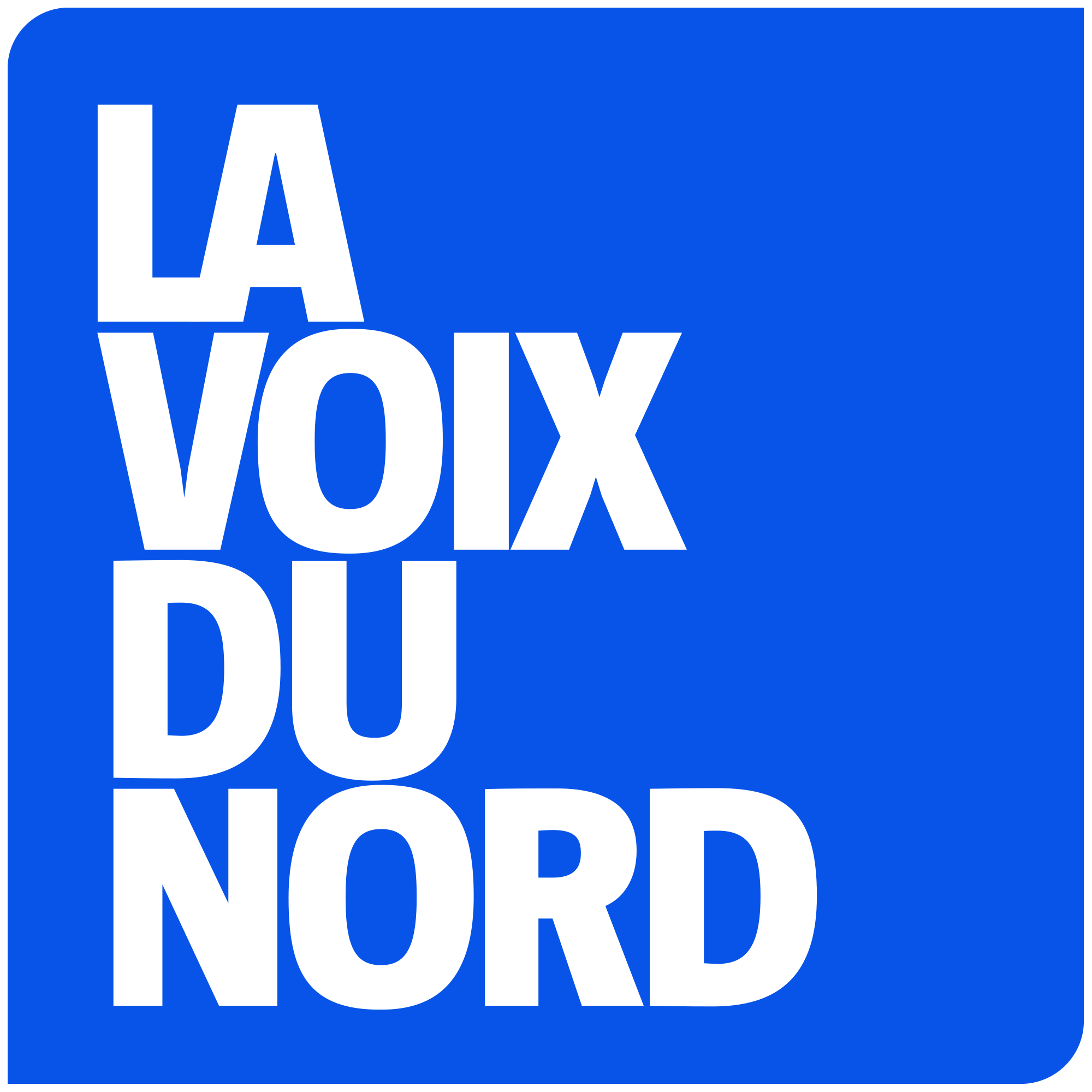
- Type: Regional daily newspaper
- Format: Tabloid
- Owner: Rossel Group
- Founded: 1941; 85 years ago
- Language: French
- Headquarters: Lille
- Circulation: 199,713 (as of 2020)
- ISSN: 0999-2189
- Website: www.lavoixdunord.fr

La Voix du Nord (French pronunciation: [la vwa dy nɔʁ], lit. 'The Voice of the North' or 'The Voice of Nord') is a regional daily newspaper from the north of France. Its headquarters are in Lille.

== History ==
Voix du Nord was one of the underground newspapers of the French Resistance founded in German-occupied France during World War II. The paper first appeared in Lille in April 1941 at a time when the region of Nord-Pas-de-Calais was being ruled by a German military government in Brussels. The newspaper's tag-line described itself as the "Resistance organ of French Flanders."

The post-war version of the paper is part of the Belgian company, Rossel group, which also owns the major Belgian newspaper Le Soir, which it bought from Socpresse in 2006.

=== Origins in Occupied France ===
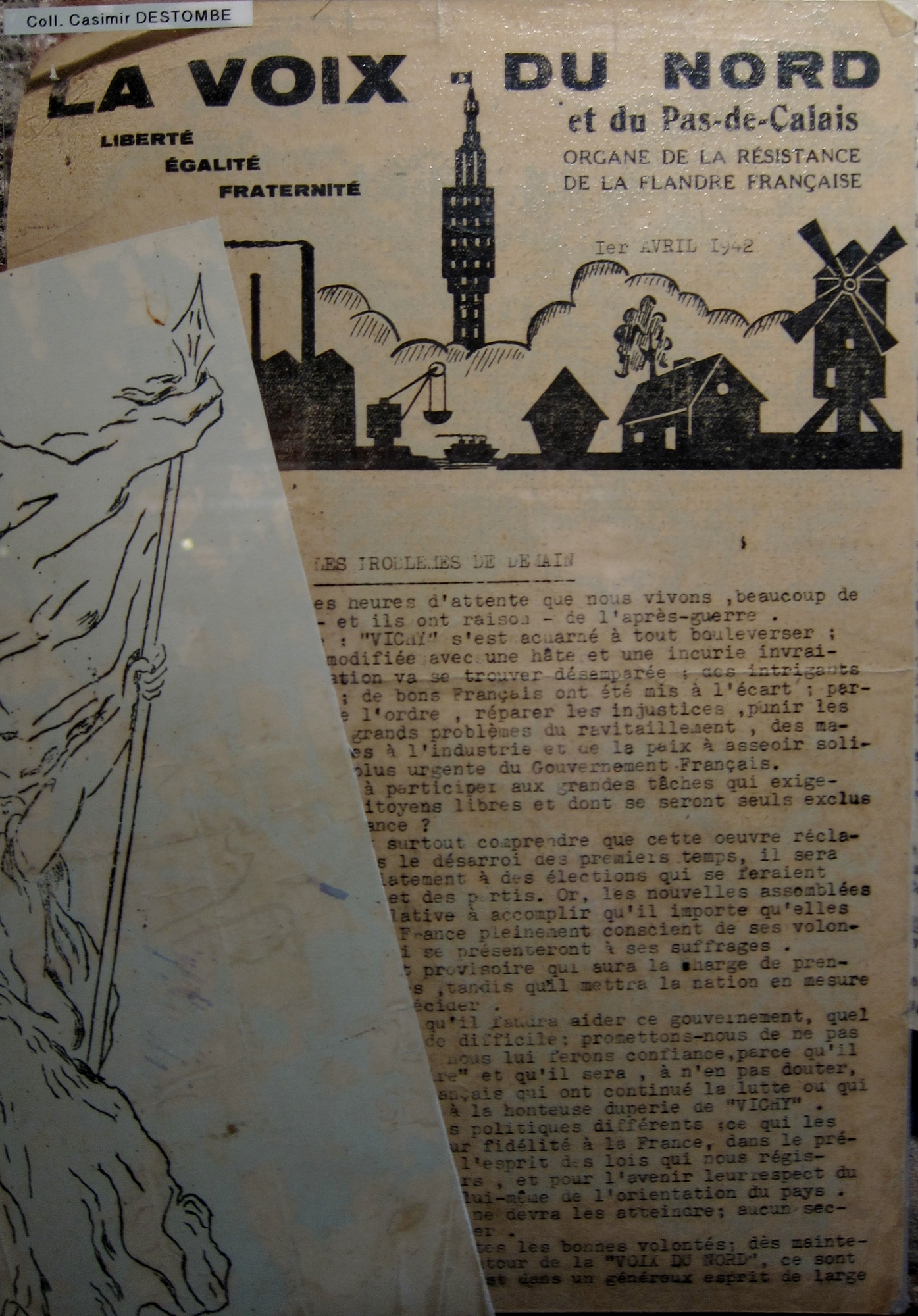
The edition of 1 April 1942 at the Resistance Museum of Bondues

La Voix du Nord is a clandestine newspaper that gave rise to a movement of political resistance. The resistance group was called Voix du Nord ("Voice of the North"—of France, or, "Voice of the Nord "—a French department). Sixty-five copies of the first issue of the newspaper were printed, dated April 1941. It clearly announced the newspaper's mission statement:

In France no newspaper, no radio, and no man can speak freely in the French language. The only French voices come to us through the radio from London; we are in agreement with them; and we believe: one does not compromise with duty and honor; one does not compromise with evil; one does not collaborate with the enemy.

— Source: La Voix du Nord, April 1941 (Note: Mission statement from first issue: "En France aucune presse, aucune radio, aucun homme ne peut parler librement un langage français. Les seules voix françaises nous viennent par la radio de Londres, avec elles, nous sommes d'accord et nous pensons : on ne transige pas avec le devoir et avec l'honneur; on ne pactise pas avec le mal; on ne collabore pas avec l'ennemi.")

The newspaper affirmed its support for General de Gaulle and its opposition to the Vichy government. At the outset, they were two very different men: Jules Noutour, police brigadier, trade unionist, and socialist member of the SFIO party; joined by Natalis Dumez, social Catholic. Dumez was the heart and soul of the editorial staff: she was primarily responsible for the four hundred articles that appeared in the first 39 issues. Noutour was arrested on 8 September 1943 and deported to Gross Rosen, where he died 1 February 1945.

From the four Roneotyped pages of the first day, the newspaper rapidly grew to six, and then ten pages. Due to the difficulties in obtaining supplies of paper, the page count was later reduced to four pages in February 1943. Circulation was around 900 copies initially, growing to 15,000 in January 1943. The paper came out every two weeks through September 1942, and monthly from 1943 on.

The last two issues were published in July and August 1944 under the responsibility of Jules Houcke, who published the first openly distributed issue of "La Voix du Nord" on September 5, 1944. The first page is crossed out, with a headline spanning six columns: "The Northern Region is free. Freedom and independence were purchased at a high price: prison, torture, death camps for more than 530 people, who wrote, printed, and distributed these newspapers." (Note: From the September 1, 1944 issue: "La Région du Nord est libre . La liberté et l'indépendance furent payés au prix fort : la prison, la torture, les camps de la mort pour plus de 530 personnes, qui ont écrit, imprimé et diffusé ces journaux.")

=== Modern ===
After the war, the paper was reborn as a hybrid partnership and limited liability company "La Voix du Nord - Houcke and Company". They took over the premises of the Grand Écho du Nord, and as was the habit elsewhere in France, they kept the staff on as well, and it was they who produced the former newspaper of the Resistance. For the original journalists who were actually part of the Resistance and notably the two co-founders who had not yet returned from deportation abroad in February 1945, it was a betrayal by pseudo-Resistance members. The shares of the new company rose in 1945, the original owners and members were priced out, and it took thirty years of litigation before they achieved success. In the 1950s, the paper started printing various local editions, giving it a regional coverage.

Voix du Nord is published in tabloid. The paper sponsors the Grand Prix de Fourmies bicycle race.

== Circulation ==
Year	Circulation
1998	323,000
2000	332,000
2001	320,000
2002	307,191
2003	315,000
2014	231,066
2015	226,214
2016	214,542
2017	209,203
2018	204,219
2019	207,861
2020	199,713
2021	193,018
2025	151,345

== See also ==
- List of newspapers in France
