= Le Figaro Magazine =

French weekly news magazine

- Categories: News magazine
- Frequency: Weekly
- Publisher: Société du Figaro S.A.
- Founded: 1978; 48 years ago
- Company: Groupe Figaro
- Country: France
- Based in: Paris
- Language: French
- Website: www.lefigaro.fr/lefigaromagazine/
- ISSN: 0184-9336

Le Figaro Magazine (French: [l(ə) fiɡaʁo magazin]) is a French weekly news magazine published in Paris. The magazine is the weekly supplement of the daily newspaper Le Figaro and has been in circulation since 1978.

== History ==
The magazine is the first supplement of Le Figaro newspaper. It was established in 1978, when Le Figaro Littéraire was renamed as Le Figaro Magazine. Louis Pauwels was functional in its start and was appointed its director. His daughter, Marie-Claire Pauwels, worked as fashion director of the magazine from 1980 to 2006.

The magazine is part of the Figaro Group which also owns the daily newspaper Le Figaro and the magazines Le Particulier and Madame Figaro Magazine. Le Figaro Magazine is published by Société du Figaro S.A. on a weekly basis and is sold with Le Figaro on Saturdays.

The headquarters of Le Figaro Magazine is in Paris. It provides articles on news about political events and current affairs. The weekly also features articles concerning art, music and literature.

Alexis Brezet served as the editor-in-chief of the weekly.

== Profile ==
The magazine has a right-wing stance as Le Figaro. One of the concepts the magazine opposes is cosmopolitanism, which refers to non-European immigration to France. The weekly supported the New Right movement in France. Some members of the GRECE, an ethnonationalist think-tank, sit on the editorial team of the magazine. Louis Pauwels, who directed and founded the magazine, was a member of GRECE, and Alain de Benoist, founder of the organization, was also one of the regular contributors. This close connection between the magazine and GRECE continued until 1980. Although the magazine remained loyal to its conservative stance, it began to support for neoliberalism.

== Controversy ==
In 1995 Le Figaro Magazine and Le Figaro newspaper were sentenced to pay damages following the publication of an article by Victor Loupan which claimed that the Harvard University academics were destroying the French literature. Specific targets of the criticism were two American literary scholars, Susan Rubin Suleiman and Alice Jardine, who sued the publications.

== Circulation ==
By the end of 1979, Le Figaro Magazine had nearly half a million readers. The magazine sold 497,585 copies during the 2003-2004 period. The circulation of the magazine was 448,000 copies during the 2007–2008 period. In 2009, its circulation was 424,385 copies. In 2013, the magazine had a circulation of 431,865 copies. Its circulation fell to 408,361 copies in 2014.
