= France-Guyane =

Weekly newspaper in French Guiana

- Type: Daily newspaper (1973–2020); Weekly newspaper (2023–present)
- Format: Tabloid
- Owner: Hersant Media Group
- Publisher: France-Antilles
- Founded: 1973
- Language: French
- Headquarters: Cayenne
- Country: French Guiana
- Website: www.franceguyane.fr

France-Guyane is a French-language weekly newspaper headquartered in Cayenne, French Guiana. Founded in 1973, the newspaper is a subsidiary of the France-Antilles newspaper, which is owned by the Hersant Media Group.
