= L'Est Républicain =

French daily regional newspaper

- Type: Daily newspaper
- Format: Tabloid
- Owner(s): EBRA Group (BFSM)
- Founder(s): Léon Goulette
- President: Christophe Mahieu
- Editor: Frédérick Macé
- Founded: 5 May 1889; 136 years ago
- Language: French
- Headquarters: rue Théophraste-Renaudot, Houdemont, 54185 Heillecourt
- City: Nancy
- Country: France
- Circulation: 110,697 (as of 2020)
- ISSN: 0240-4958
- Website: www.estrepublicain.fr

L'Est Républicain (French pronunciation: [lɛst ʁepyblikɛ̃], lit. 'The Republican East') is a daily regional French newspaper based in Nancy, France.

L'Est Républicain was established in 1889 by Léon Goulette, a French Republican. The newspaper was founded on the grounds of anti-Boulangisme. It was closed down in 1941 when France was under German occupation during World War II. In 1946 it was restarted. The paper is headquartered in Nancy and has its primary market in the regions of Lorraine and Franche-Comté.

L'Est Républicain has a conservative stance. The paper belongs to Société du Journal l'Est Republicain SA, who also owns the newspapers La Liberté de l'Est and Les Dernières Nouvelles d'Alsace among others. The publisher of L'Est Républicain is Est Bourgogne Rhône Alpes.

On 23 September 2006, L'Est Républicain published a report on the possible death of Osama bin Laden.

The circulation of the daily was 180,000 copies in 2009.

== History ==
=== 1889-1914: Foundation and development ===
L'Est Républicain was founded in Nancy by Léon Goulette on 5 May 1889, the day of the inauguration of the Exposition Universelle for which the Eiffel Tower was built. The first issue was printed in 1200 copies on four pages. The newspaper was then the sixth daily in the Nancy press, alongside the Journal de la Meurthe et des Vosges (1799), L'Espérance (1838) and L'Impartial. Sold for 5 cents, the newspaper had an anti-Boulangist and pro-Republican stance. It was read by many figures of Republican sensitivity, such as Jules Méline, Jules Ferry, Émile Gallé, Auguste Daum, Alfred Mézières, as well as political figures from Nancy and Lorraine. Its headquarters were then located in rue de Saint-Dizier in downtown Nancy.

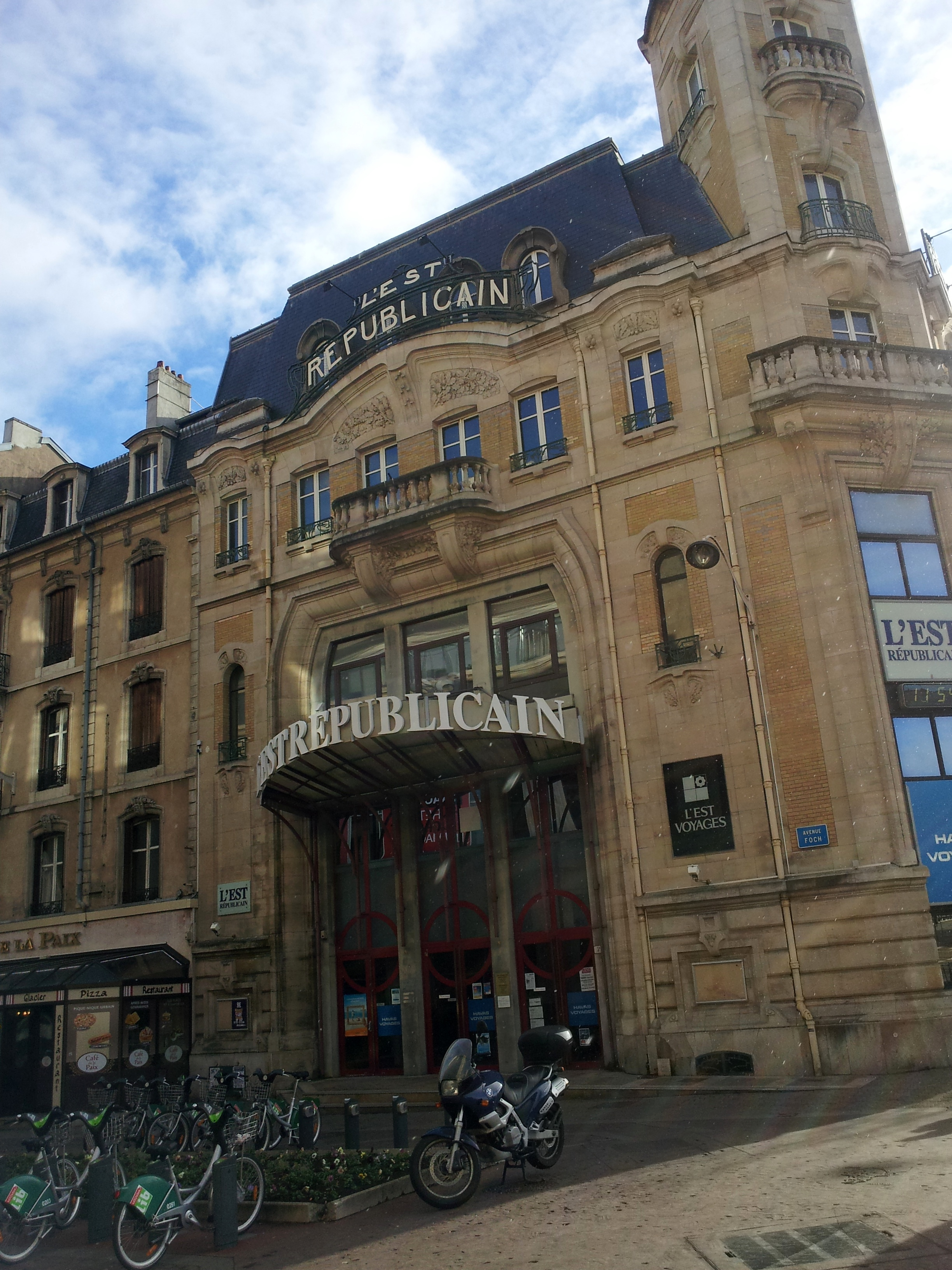
The former headquarters of the regional daily, avenue Foch in Nancy.

On 1 April 1911 René Mercier became head of the newspaper, replacing Léon Goulette who held an anti-Dreyfusard position. Mercier opened an agency in Paris to collect political information and advertisements. The newspaper then generated enough profit to be self-financing. Due to the premises' becoming too cramped, René Mercier bought land from the Compagnie de l'Est, at the corner of the Faubourg Saint-Jean. In March 1913, the editorial staff moved into a hotel designed by the French architect Pierre Le Bourgeois in the style of the École de Nancy. At the same time, the director bought a new press with a speed of 20,000 copies per hour, making it possible to increase the number of pages and editions without increasing the price.

In 1911, the circulation was 21,000 copies divided into three editions. The newspaper was modernized: new presentation, introduction of photographs, new sections on fashion, industry and agriculture, hiring of young journalists and numerous correspondents. The L'Est Républicain went through six editions, extending to neighboring departments: the Vosges and the Meuse. The newspaper then shifted rather to the left, while denouncing pacifists and antimilitarists, and supporting the action of the Lorraine-based Raymond Poincaré, President of the French Republic.

=== 1914-1945: The journal during the two world wars ===
In 1914, following the outbreak of the First World War, the newspaper lost much of its staff. Located in a combat zone, it fell victim to French military censorship. But it continued, nonetheless, to be published, sometimes on a single double-sided sheet. The newspaper helped maintain the morale of Nancy, especially during the Battle of Grand Couronné in 1914, and when evacuating the city was considered in 1918. On the night of 26 to 27 February 1918 the printing house was bombed, but the newspaper continued to be distributed on one page.

In 1920, the printing amounted to 60,000 copies. In 1927, the newspaper was printed in 100,000 copies and extended its distribution to Haute-Saône and the Territoire de Belfort. In 1933, L'Est Républicain had offices in Bar-le-Duc, Verdun, Metz, Thionville, Épinal, Saint-Dié and Belfort.

Before World War II, L'Est Républicain held an anti-Nazi line. Paper restrictions and power cuts made it difficult for the newspaper to be published. On 13 June 1940 the newspaper was published for the last time. On 14 June, as the Germans entered Paris, the newspaper was scuttled, just like its competitor, L'Éclair de l'Est, the next day. On 18 June the Germans entered Nancy, and on 8 July the authorities requisitioned the premises of L'Est Républicain.

As the region had then no written information, the editors of L'Est Républicain and L'Éclair de l'Est created the Nancy Presse newsletter which would be published until 3 August 1940. On 2 August 1940 the collaborationist journal L'Écho de Nancy published its first number. Totally controlled by the Germans, it defended Nazism, Adolf Hitler and advocated for antisemitism. The last issue printed in the installations of L'Est Républicain came out on 1 September 1944, but it continued to be printed in Germany until February 1945.

At the Liberation, the L'Est Républicain was requisitioned by the Resistance, which accused it of having collaborated with the Nazis. The resistance fighters printed the République de l'Est Libéré. Finally, on 8 October 1944 L'Est Républicain returned with Jacques Zenner as editor 11 and several agencies, in Metz, Nancy, Besançon, Pontarlier, etc.

=== 1945-1997: Resuming development ===
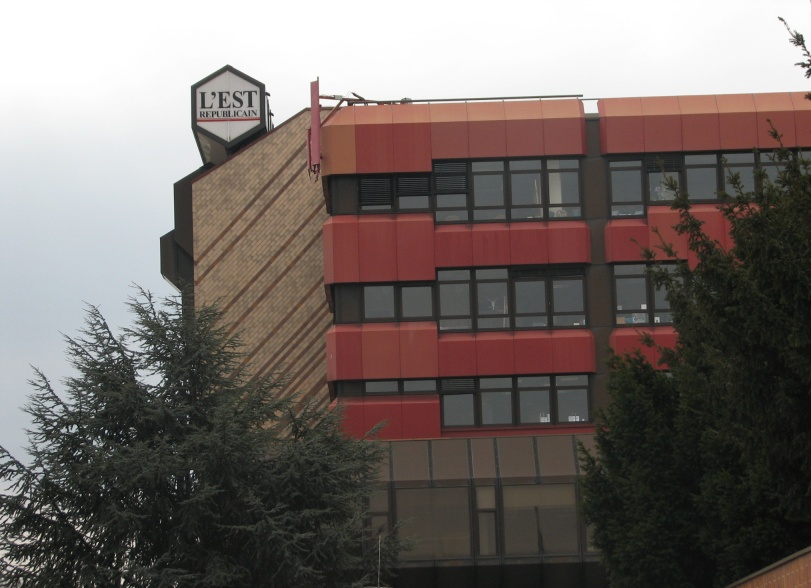
The newspaper's premises in Houdemont.

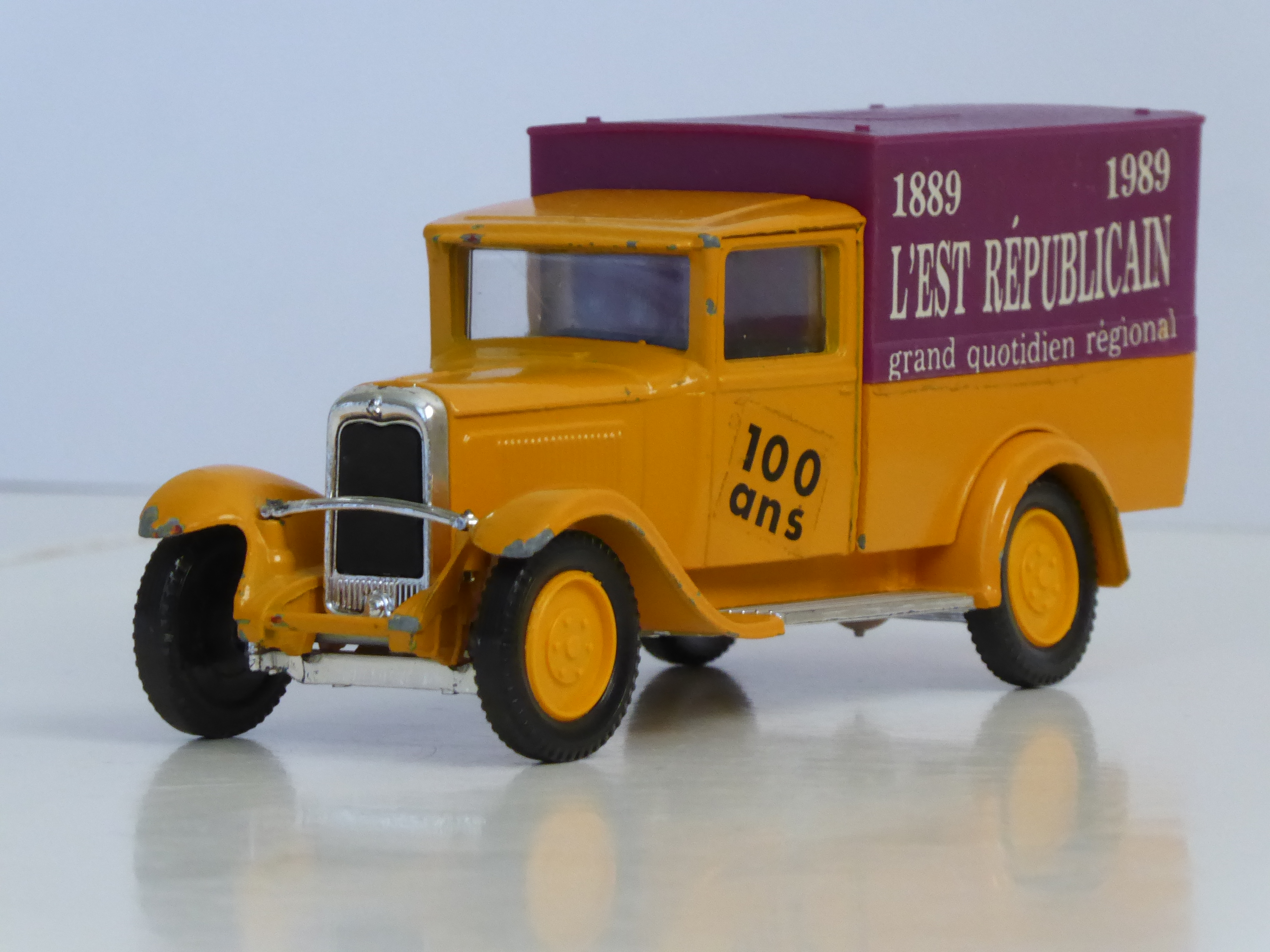
Model of the Citroën C4 truck used in the 1930s for the delivery of newspapers to retailers.

In 1951, the circulation reached 200,000 copies. The newspaper spread to Haute-Marne and Franche-Comté. In addition, a new edition was created for the Doubs with the opening of an office in Besançon.

In 1968, the newspaper signed a collaboration agreement with Le Journal de la Haute-Marne. Sales, writing and production services for the direction were pooled, while the results were split 50/50.

In 1977, a survey by the Center for the Study of Advertising Media (CESP) placed the L'Est Républicain group in fourth place in the French daily press with 1,356,000 readers. In June 1979, the newspaper was building new premises in Houdemont, in the suburbs of Nancy. In 1985, all departments, except the local editorial office in Nancy, moved to the new premises.

Since 1982, all editions of L'Est Républicain were printed in offset. In 1983, Gérard Lignac, who had been administrator of the newspaper since 1966, became its president. In 1989, the newspaper celebrated its centenary by opening its doors to 15,000 readers.

On 6 June 1990 the newspaper launched a daily Braille edition, the first in Europe and the second in the world.

In April 1994, L'Est Républicain was a partner with M6 for the production of the local 6 Minutes Nancy, later renamed Le Six 'Nancy.

=== 1997-2010: Establishment of the Republican group East ===
In May 1997, L'Est Républicain became the majority shareholder of the Les Dernières Nouvelles d'Alsace, based in Strasbourg, by buying back the shares of Banque Vernes for 250 million francs. At the same time, the group sold the newspapers L'Est-Éclair and Libération Champagne to the France-Antilles group, which also owns 27% of L'Est Républicain.

In October 1999, L'Est Républicain took control of its competitor La Liberté de l'Est, thus strengthening its influence in eastern France. On 26 October Christophe de Beco, nephew of CEO Gérard Lignac, was appointed managing director of L'Est Républicain.

In October 2002, Le Journal de la Haute-Marne became a société par actions simplifiée 50% owned by L'Est Républicain.

In February 2006, Est Républicain or France Est Médias group bought the Rhône-Alpes division from Socpresse for €270 million (Le Progrès, Le Dauphiné libéré, Le Bien public, Le Journal de Saône-et-Loire) with financial support from the Banque Federative du Crédit Mutuel (BFCM). The new entity formed is the EBRA group, 51% owned by the Est Républicain group and 49% by Crédit Mutuel.

On 23 September 2006 L'Est Républicain revealed a confidential-defense note from the DGSE indicating that the Saudi secret services were convinced that Osama bin Laden died on 23 August 2006 of a typhoid fever attack. The information was not confirmed by France or the United States.

In June 2008, Crédit Mutuel acquired the company France Est, which holds 18% of the capital of the Est Républicain group, which itself holds 51% of the EBRA group. Crédit Mutuel thus became the majority shareholder of the EBRA group. However, the Hersant Media group, a minority shareholder of the Est Républicain group, asked for the cancellation of this takeover which reduced its share from 27% to 17%, dispossessing it of its blocking minority. The Nancy commercial court ruled in their favor on 23 December 2008 and the Nancy Court of Appeal confirmed the sentence on 17 June 2009.

On 2 January 2009 La Liberté de l'Est and the Vosges edition of L'Est Républicain were replaced by the newspaper Vosges Matin.

On 23 February 2010 L'Est Républicain changed its appearance with a new logo, a new format (large format decreased from 8 to 7 columns), a new layout, and a new editorial project. The newspaper was structured around three pillars: proximity to events, decryption of current events and investigation; and divided into five spaces: Town and local, Region, Sports, France-World, East and vous (everyday life). The cost of this change was 2 million euros.

=== Acquisition by Crédit Mutuel ===
In October 2010, the Banque Fédérative du Crédit Mutuel (BFCM) bought the 29% held by the Hersant Media group in the Est Républicain group. Already owner of a share of the capital, it now owned 48% of the Eastern Republican group. The following month, it bought 43% of shares of CEO Gérard Lignac and thus took control of the group, which was integrated into the EBRA group. On 12 July 2011 the Autorité de la concurrence authorized the takeover of the Est Républicain group by Crédit Mutuel. In October 2011, Pierre Wicker became the joint general manager of L'Est Républicain, Le Républicain Lorrain and Vosges Matin.

On 1 October 2013 the Franche-Comté daily Le Pays, owned by L'Alsace, was sold to L'Est Républicain. It was a question of putting an end to a "sterile and unproductive" competition between the two titles, properties of the EBRA group. The 40 employees of Le Pays joined the 73 journalists of L'Est Républicain in Franche-Comté, and an edition of L'Est Républicain-Le Pays was produced.

On 16 November 2016 a new tabloid format was created. The 64-page journal was divided into two notebooks: one general and one local. This new format required 9 months to be completed and cost €500,000 to adapt the presses. The newspaper then employed 650 people and achieved a turnover of nearly 81 million euros. A new version of the website was planned for January 2017.

== Circulation ==
Daily circulation of the newspaper
Year	2005	2006	2007	2008	2009	2010	2011	2012	2013	2014	2015	2016	2017	2018	2019	2020
Circulation	194,000	190,000	186,000	185,000	161,000		149,172	140,564	130,606	129,373	125,319	122,174	117,550	114,212	110,996	110,697

== Headquarters ==
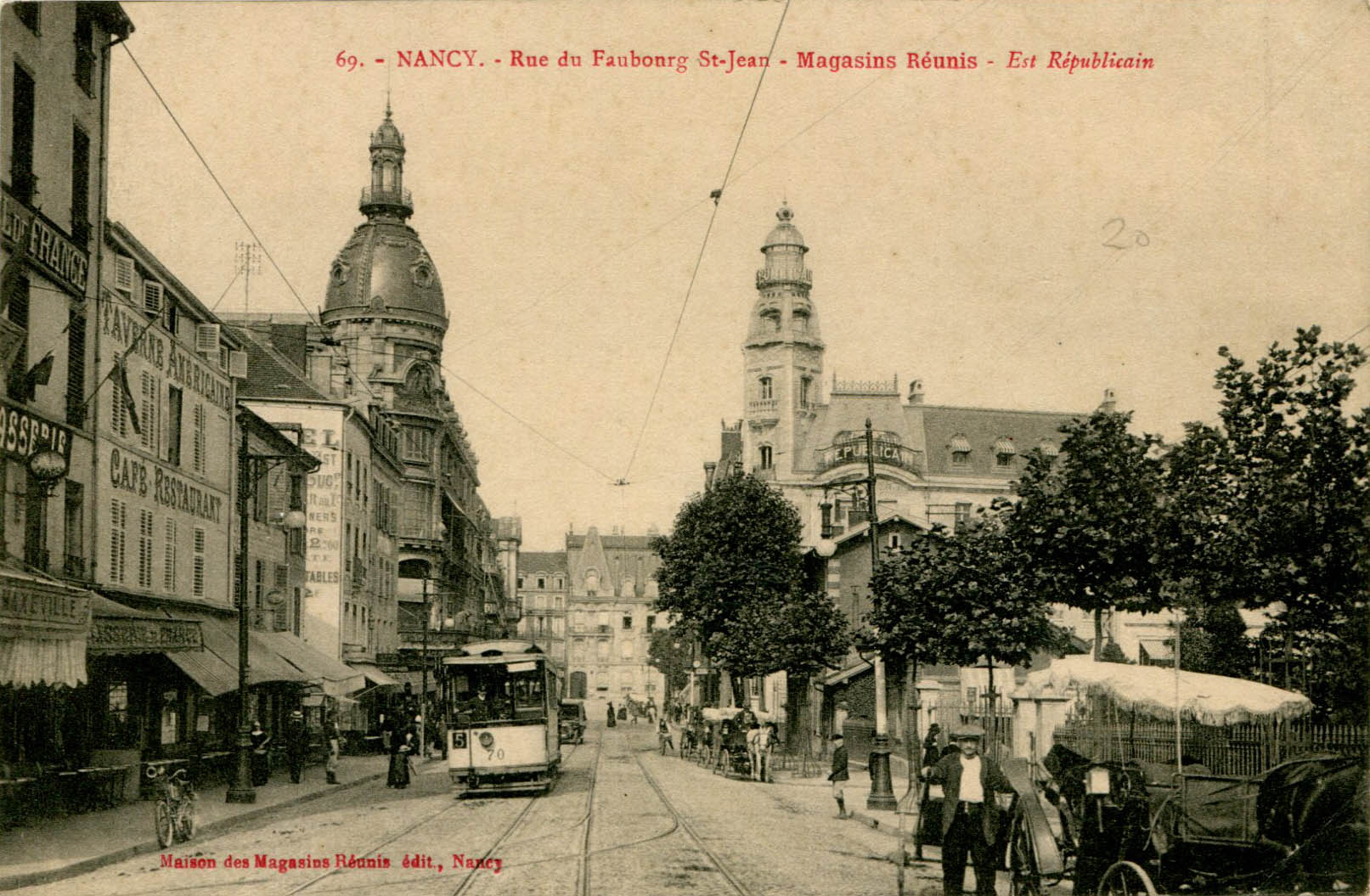
Tour d'angle of the headquarters of l'Est républicain (right) facing the dome of the Magasins réunis in 1913, seen from avenue Foch

The first headquarters of L'Est Républicain were located on rue Saint-Dizier, in the city center of Nancy.

In March 1913, the head office was transferred to a building located at the corner of avenue Foch and boulevard Joffre, opposite the Magasins Réunis, not far from the station. It was designed by the French architect Pierre Le Bourgeois in the style of the École de Nancy, similar to Art Nouveau. An underground used to connect this building to the one where the presses and linotypes were located and which was located a few dozen meters away, at the corner of the place Thiers and rue Mazagran.

Since 1985, the head office is located at rue Théophraste-Renaudot in Houdemont, in the suburbs of Nancy. Its construction was started in June 1979.

== See also ==
- List of newspapers in France
