= Observatoire du décolonialisme =

French organization

The Observatoire d’éthique universitaire, formerly Observatoire du décolonialisme, is a conservative media organization created in France in 2021, funded by Pierre-Édouard Stérin's Périclès project, and devoted to the surveillance of the latest research in the social sciences, seeking to spot and denounce an allegedly widespread decolonialist ideology.

The publications of this group argue that academic freedom in French universities is endangered by a category of scholars pertaining to so-called islamo-leftism, accusing them of importing ideas from the United States of America. Their texts, albeit frequently written by researchers, rely mainly on mockery. In 2022, the Observatoire organised a meeting in the Sorbonne, attracting mixed reactions. After the government turned down the idea of a scientific enquiry into the presence of islamo-gauchisme among French scholars, the Observatoire claimed it would take up this task on its own. The Observatoire enjoys a relatively large coverage by such press as Le Point, and links to far-right politician Éric Zemmour have been purported.
