= L'Yonne républicaine =

Newspaper based in Auxerre, France

- Type: Daily newspaper
- Format: Broadsheet
- Owner: Centre-France
- Founded: 1944; 81 years ago
- Language: French
- Headquarters: Auxerre
- Circulation: 22,748 (2020)
- Website: lyonne.fr

L'Yonne républicaine (French pronunciation: [ljɔn ʁepyblikɛn]) is a regional daily newspaper which is based in Auxerre, Yonne. It started its publication in 1944.

In 2018, its average daily circulation was 25,980 copies with an audience of 105,000 readers. By 2020, the average circulation had dropped to 22,748.
