= JSL S.A. =

- Type: Sociedade Anônima
- Traded as: B3: JSLG3
- Industry: Conglomerate logistics
- Founded: 1964
- Headquarters: Mogi das Cruzes & São Paulo, Brazil
- Key people: Fernando Antonio Simões, (Chairman & CEO)
- Products: Multimodal transport, car rental
- Revenue: ▲US$ 2.0 billion (2018)
- Net income: ▲US$ 48.5 million (2018)
- Number of employees: 16,800
- Website: www.jsl.com.br

JSL (Júlio Simões Logistica) is a Brazilian conglomerate intermodal logistic company owned by Simões family. The company was founded in 1956, in Mogi das Cruzes in Greater São Paulo by Júlio Simões, is headquartered in Mogi das Cruzes and its corporate office is located in São Paulo. The company operates in segments of supply chain dedicated services, cargo transportation and passenger transportation, outsourced fleet management and vehicle commercialization and car rental.

JSL is present in all the regions of Brazil, with 144 operational branches in 15 states and in Argentina, Chile, Uruguay and Venezuela. The company has more than 3.600 trucks, 4.200 trailers, 16.400 cars, 941 buses and 1.700 tractors and equipment and more than 16.000 employees.

Nowadays, it is the most significant road transportation enterprise in Brazil and has subsidiaries around the country. In 2015, JSL has revenue of R$8.5 billion.
