= La République des Pyrénées =

- Type: Daily newspaper
- Format: Regional press
- Owner: Groupe Sud Ouest
- Founded: 1944
- Language: French
- City: Pau
- Country: France
- Circulation: 26,121 (as of 2021)
- ISSN: 0247-7807
- Website: www.larepubliquedespyrenees.fr

La République des Pyrénées (French pronunciation: [la ʁepyblik de piʁene]) is a French regional daily newspaper published mainly in Béarn and Soule. Its headquarters are located in Pau, in the department of Pyrénées-Atlantiques. The newspaper also operates agencies in Orthez and Oloron-Sainte-Marie.

== Editorial line ==
La République des Pyrénées was founded "from the will of Resistance leaders to create an independent newspaper". At its beginnings, it identified with the political left, while the regional competitor L'Éclair was closer to the centre-right.

Locally nicknamed La République, and more commonly La Rép, the daily shares offices and much of its content with L'Éclair des Pyrénées, though both retain distinctive editorials.

In spring 2022, the newspaper launched its online channel, La Rép' des Pyrénées TV, offering a weekly programme schedule.

== Circulation ==
La République des Pyrénées is by far the leading daily newspaper in its region, with more than 26,000 copies sold each day, compared with about 5,500 for L'Éclair and 9,000 for the Béarn edition of Sud Ouest.

In 2022, it ranked 8th among French newspapers receiving direct state press subsidies, with €1.3 million in aid.

The newspaper is also a leader in local digital information, with more than 4.5 million monthly visits and 15 million page views on its website larepubliquedespyrenees.fr and mobile apps. Its social media audience includes nearly 145,000 followers on Facebook, 22,200 on Instagram, and 17,700 on Twitter.

Average daily print circulation (source: Alliance pour les chiffres de la presse et des médias):

Year	2019	2020	2021	2022	2023	2024
La République des Pyrénées	26,115	26,349	26,069	25,546	24,979	24,433

== Organisation ==
In June 2011, Jean-Pierre Cassagne left his position as CEO of Pyrénées Presse after 26 years, and was succeeded by Christophe Galichon until 2017. As of today, the editor-in-chief is Nicolas Rebière (also the publication director), while the CEO is Patrick Venries.

== Visual identity ==
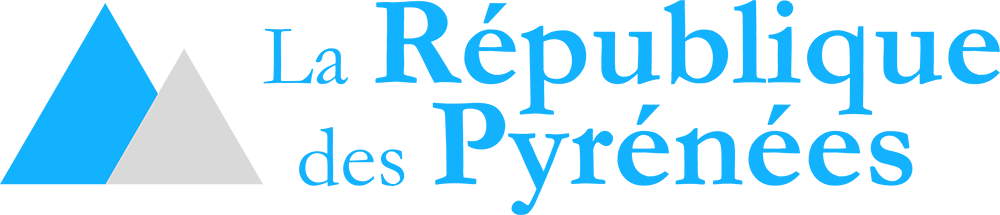
Logo until 2024

Current logo (since 2024)

== See also ==
- List of newspapers in France
- Alliance pour les chiffres de la presse et des médias
- Le Patriote des Pyrénées
