= Vosges Matin =

French newspaper

- The 8 April 2022 front page of Vosges Matin, La Plaine edition
- Type: Daily newspaper
- Format: Tabloid
- Owner: EBRA Group
- Editor-in-chief: Sébastien Georges
- Founded: 2009; 17 years ago
- Language: French
- Headquarters: Épinal
- ISSN: 2274-6986

Vosges Matin (French pronunciation: [voʒ matɛ̃], lit. 'Vosges Morning') is a French regional daily newspaper focusing particularly on news from the Vosges department and its neighboring departments of Meurthe-et-Moselle, Meuse, Haute-Saône, Doubs and Territoire de Belfort. Its headquarters are in Épinal.

== History ==
Launched on January 2, 2009, Vosges-Matin is a regional daily created at the initiative of L'Est Républicain (which bought the title in 1999) to replace La Liberté de l'Est.

On November 16, 2016, a new tabloid format was introduced. The 64-page journal is divided into two notebooks: a general and a local. On Mondays, the interior notebook is devoted to sport.

== Local editions ==
- Edition de la Plaine (transl. Edition of the Plaine)
- Edition du Soir Vosges (transl. Vosges Evening Edition)
- Edition d'Epinal – Remiremont (transl. Edition of Épinal – Remiremont)
- Edition de Saint-Dié – Massif des Vosges (transl. Edition of Saint-Dié-des-Vosges mountains)
