= La Nouvelle République des Pyrénées =

French regional newspaper headquartered in Tarbes

- Type: Daily newspaper
- Publisher: Groupe La Dépêche
- Founded: 1944
- Language: French
- City: Tarbes (Hautes-Pyrénées)
- Country: France
- Circulation: 26,349 (as of 2020)
- Readership: 47,000 daily
- ISSN: 1146-447X
- OCLC number: 473181012
- Website: www.nrpyrenees.com

La Nouvelle République des Pyrénées ("Pyrenees French New Republic") is a daily newspaper published by Groupe La Dépêche and circulated in the French Department of Hautes-Pyrénées.

It was founded in 1944 after the Liberation of France in World War II.

Originally owned by Groupe Hersant, it was integrated into Groupe la Dépêche in 1982. It was at first an evening newspaper, but from 2001 became a morning newspaper. La Nouvelle République des Pyrénées is headquartered in Tarbes, and it has a weekday circulation of 14,000 copies a day; there is no Sunday edition.

The newspaper has professional journalists in Lourdes, Bagnères-de-Bigorre and Lannemezan, but relies on a network of over 150 local correspondents to cover daily news from the 474 communes of Hautes-Pyrénées.
