= La Loi (newspaper) =

- Type: Daily newspaper
- Founder: A. Chevalier-Maresq
- Founded: 1880
- Language: French language
- Headquarters: 60, Quai des Orfèvres, Paris 48°51′23.1″N 2°20′30.3″E

La Loi (French pronunciation: [la lwa], lit. 'The Law') was a daily newspaper published in Paris, France, founded in 1880 by A. Chevalier-Maresq. La Loi was dedicated to covering legal issues. As of the mid-1930s, H. Frennelet was the director of the newspaper.

== Background ==
In 1888, Chevalier-Maresq sued a printer who republished the correctional police chronicles published by La Loi, but his request was denied because the initial writers of those chronicles, the police, did not complain about the reproduction of their work.
