= Nord éclair =

French regional newspaper

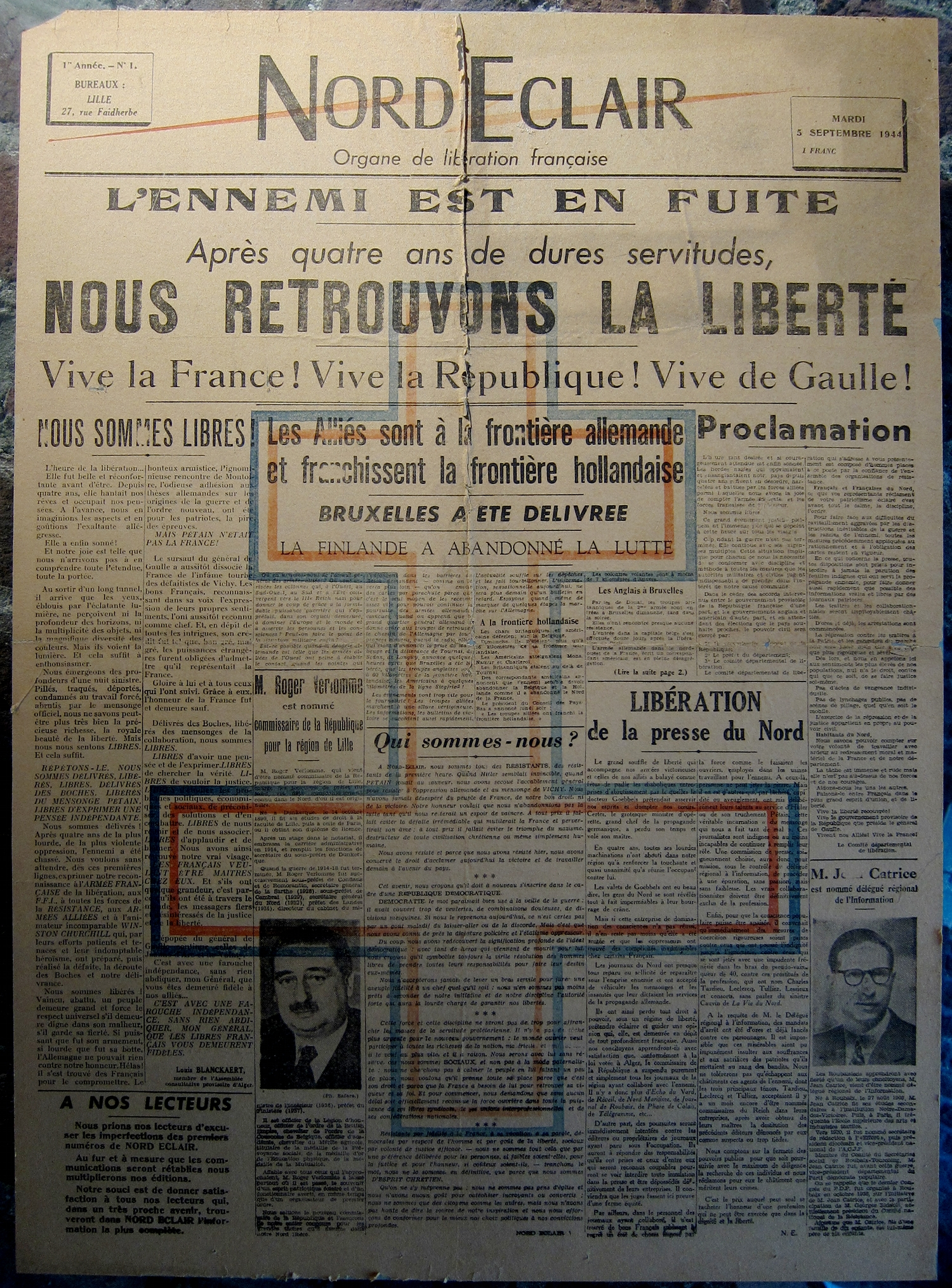
- Cover page of the first issue dated 5 September 1944
- Type: Regional newspaper
- Format: Tabloid
- Publisher: La Voix du Nord Group
- Founded: 5 September 1944; 81 years ago
- Language: French
- Headquarters: Roubaix
- Circulation: 13,901 (2019)
- ISSN: 1277-1422
- OCLC number: 473164239
- Website: Nord éclair

Nord éclair (French pronunciation: [nɔʁ eklɛʁ]) is a French language regional newspaper in Roubaix, France, that has been in circulation since 1944.

== History and profile ==
Nord éclair was first published on 5 September 1944. The paper has its headquarters in Roubaix and is published in tabloid format. It was part of the Hersant group and is published in Pilaterie, Lille, by the La Voix du Nord group.

The Belgian edition of Nord éclair has been in circulation since 1968. The paper was owned by the Socpresse SA, a subsidiary of the Hersant group. It is now part of the Belgian company Rossel. In addition Nord éclair has five editions in its circulation area.

In 1990 Nord éclair sold 99,300 copies. The paper had a circulation of 110,000 copies in 2001.

== See also ==
- List of newspapers in France
