= Le Figaro =

French daily newspaper

- Front page of 22 November 2015
- Type: Daily newspaper (since 16 November 1866)
- Format: Berliner
- Owner: Groupe Figaro (Dassault Group)
- Editor: Alexis Brézet
- Founded: 15 January 1826; 200 years ago
- Political alignment: Centre-right; French nationalism; Liberal conservatism
- Language: French
- Headquarters: 14 Boulevard Haussmann; 75009 Paris
- Country: France
- Circulation: 354,853 (total, 2022); 84,000 (digital, 2018)
- ISSN: 0182-5852 (print); 1638-606X (web)
- OCLC number: 473539292
- Website: www.lefigaro.fr

Le Figaro (French: [l(ə) fiɡaʁo]) is a French daily morning newspaper founded in 1826. The oldest national newspaper in France, Le Figaro is considered a French newspaper of record, along with Le Monde and (to a lesser extent) Libération. Le Figaro is the second-largest national newspaper nationally, after Le Monde. It was named after Figaro, a character in several plays by polymath Beaumarchais (1732–1799): Le Barbier de Séville, La Mère coupable, and the eponymous Le Mariage de Figaro. One of his lines became the paper's motto: "Without the freedom to criticise, there is no flattering praise".

It has a centre-right editorial stance, and has published writing by renowned contributors such as Émile Zola, Anatole France, Marcel Proust, François Mauriac, as well as Raymond Aron.

The paper is published in Berliner format. Its editorial director has been Alexis Brézet since 2012. It is headquartered on Boulevard Haussmann in the 9th arrondissement of Paris. Since 2004, it has been owned by Dassault Group. Other Groupe Figaro publications include Le Figaro Magazine and TV Magazine.

Le Figaro is the main sponsor of the yearly Solitaire du Figaro sailing race.

== History ==
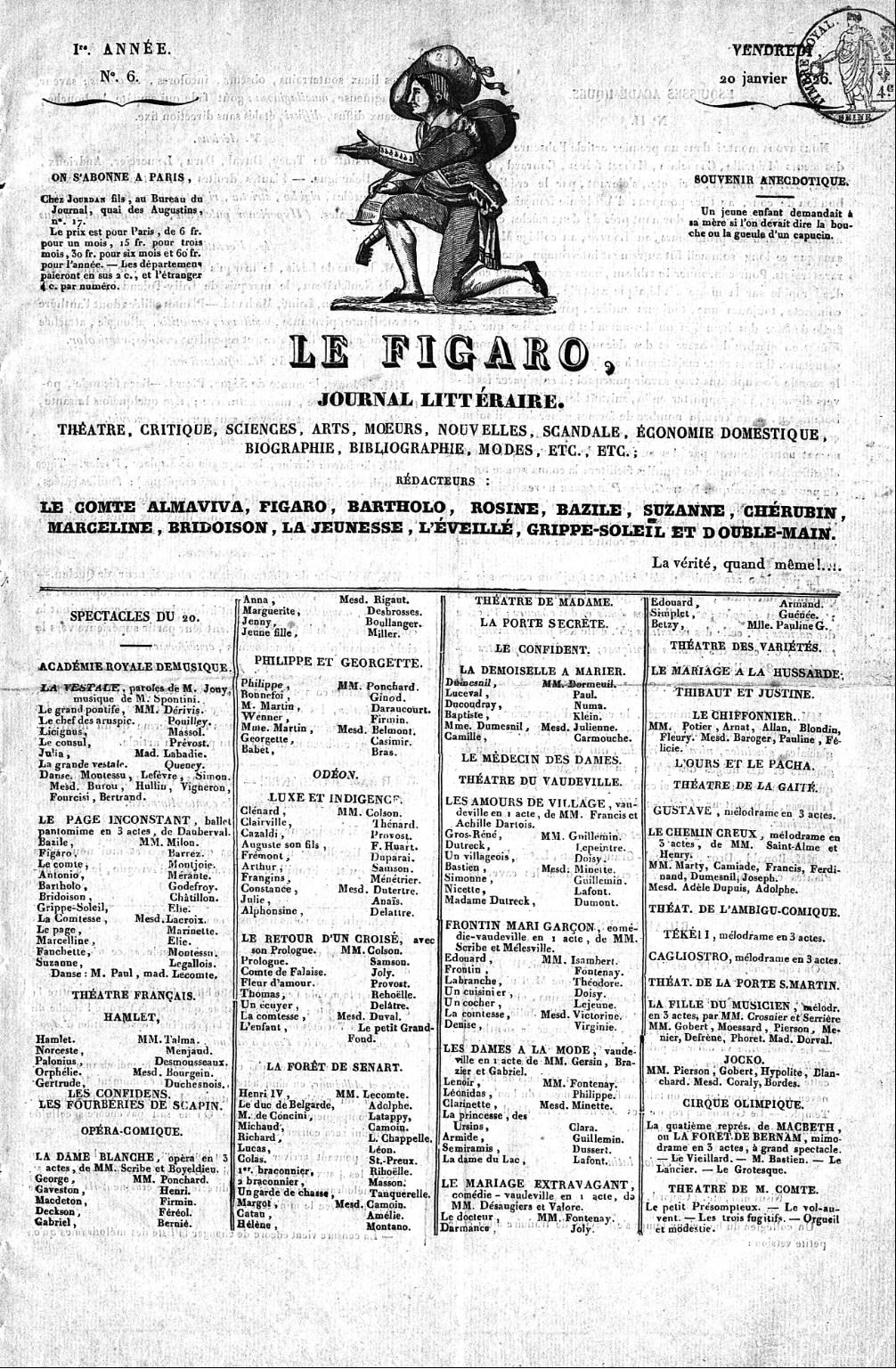
6th issue, 20 January 1826

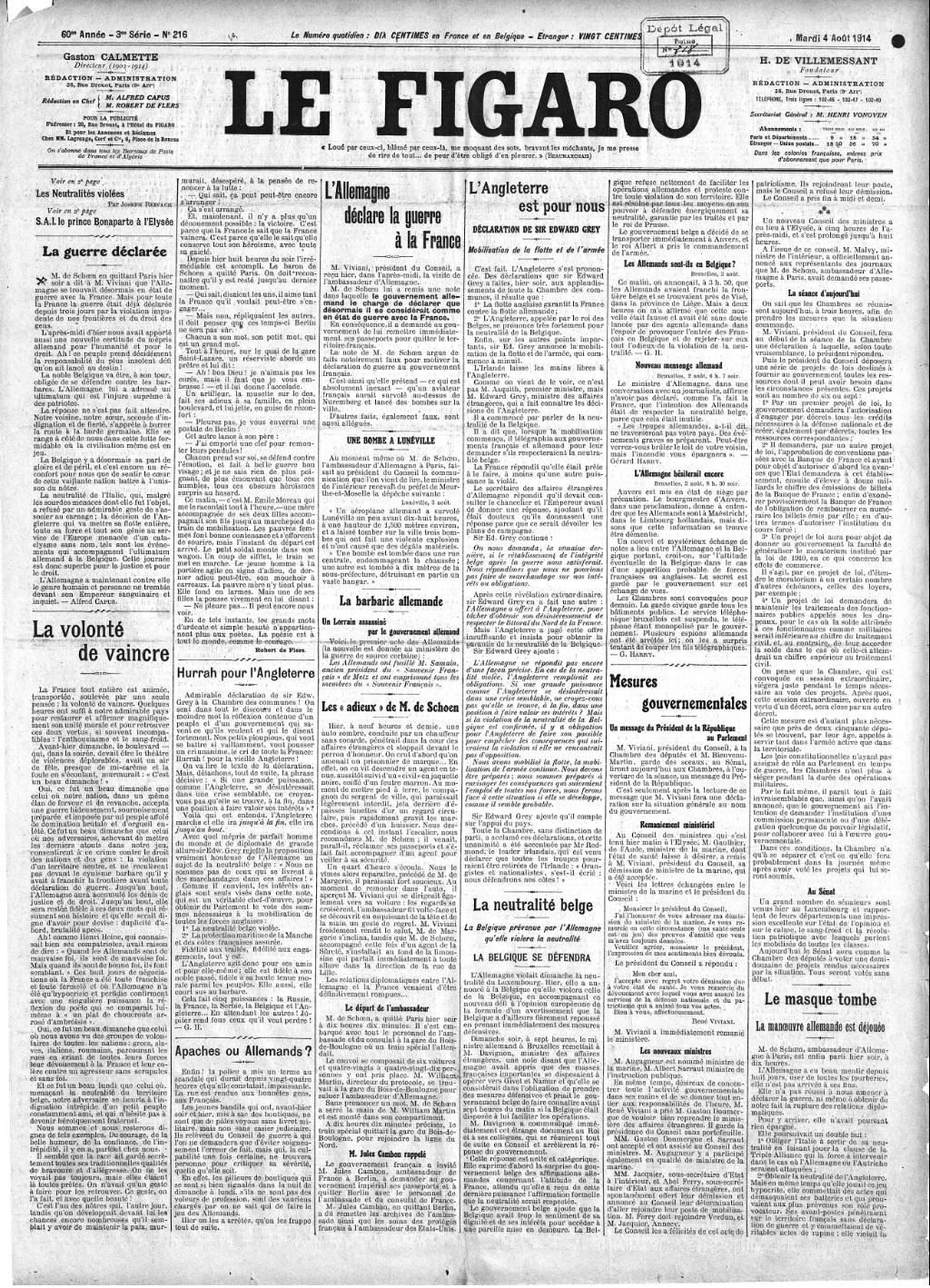
Front page of Le Figaro, 4 August 1914

Le Figaro was founded as a satirical weekly in 1826, taking its name and motto from Le Mariage de Figaro, the 1778 play by Pierre Beaumarchais that poked fun at privilege. Its motto, from Figaro's monologue in the play's final act, is "Sans la liberté de blâmer, il n'est point d'éloge flatteur" ("Without the freedom to criticise, there is no flattering praise"). In 1833, editor Nestor Roqueplan fought a duel with a Colonel Gallois, who was offended by an article in Le Figaro, and was wounded but recovered. Albert Wolff, Émile Zola, Jean-Baptiste Alphonse Karr, Théophile Gautier, and Jules Arsène Arnaud Claretie were among the paper's early contributors. It was published somewhat irregularly until 1854, when it was taken over by Hippolyte de Villemessant.

In 1866, Le Figaro became a daily newspaper. Its first daily edition, that of 16 November 1866, sold 56,000 copies, having highest circulation of any newspaper in France. Its editorial line was royalist. Pauline Savari was among the contributors to the paper at this time.

On 20 February 1909 Le Figaro published a manifesto signed by Filippo Tommaso Marinetti which initiated the establishment of Futurism in art.

On 16 March 1914, Gaston Calmette, the editor of Le Figaro, was assassinated by Henriette Caillaux, the wife of Finance Minister Joseph Caillaux, after he published a letter that cast serious doubt on her husband's integrity. In 1922, Le Figaro was purchased by perfume millionaire François Coty. Abel Faivre did cartoons for the paper. Coty enraged many in March 1929 when he renamed the paper simply Figaro, which it remained until 1933.

By the start of World War II, Le Figaro had become France's leading newspaper. After the war, it became the voice of the upper middle class, and continues to maintain a conservative position.

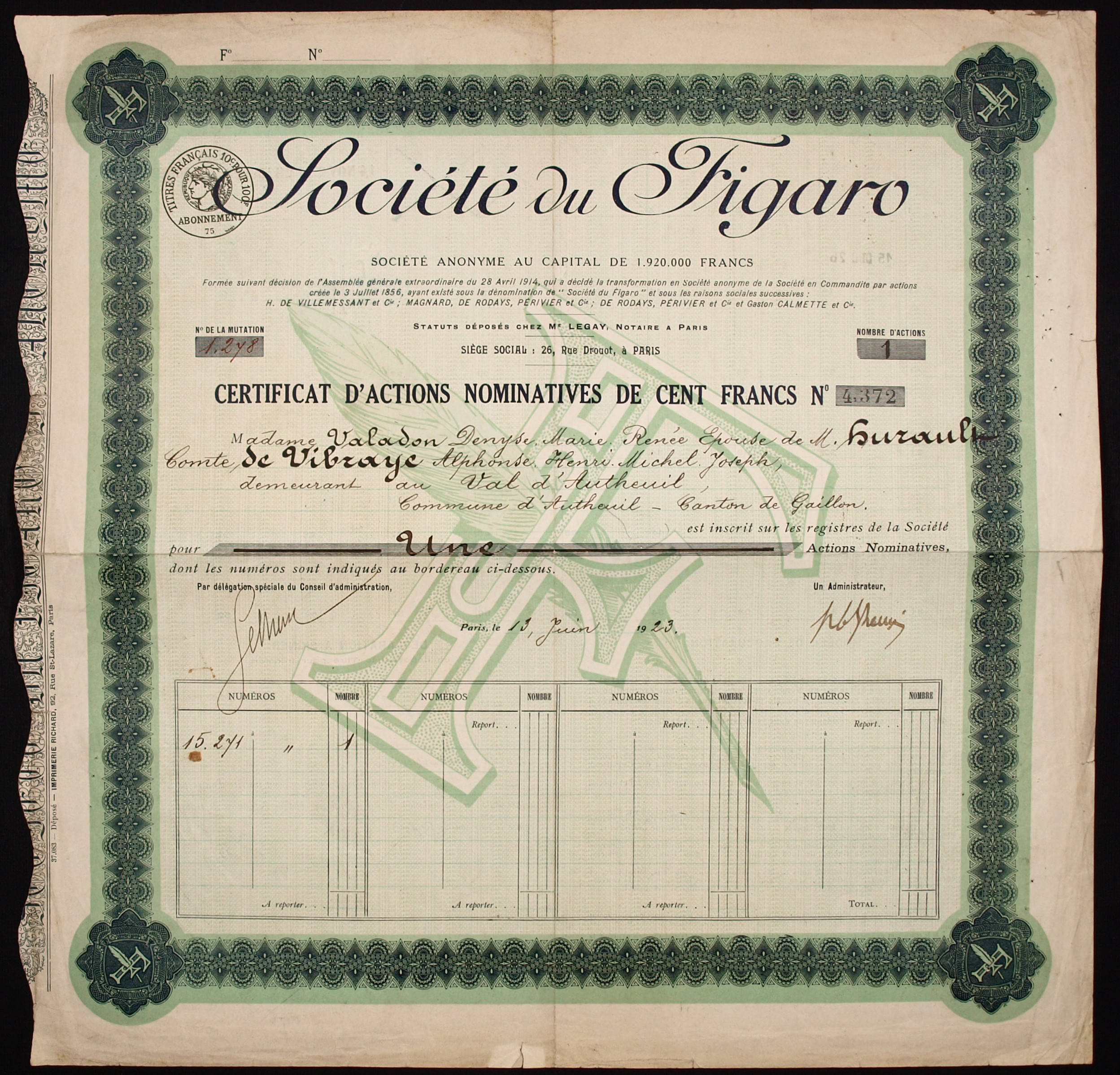
Share of the Société du Figaro, issued 13 June 1923

In 1975, Le Figaro was bought by Robert Hersant's Socpresse. In 1999, The Carlyle Group obtained a 40% stake in the paper, which it later sold in March 2002. Since March 2004, Le Figaro has been controlled by Serge Dassault, a conservative businessman and politician best known for running the aircraft manufacturer Dassault Aviation, which he inherited from his father, its founder, Marcel Dassault (1892–1986). Dassault owns 80% of the paper, by way of its media subsidiary Groupe Figaro.

Franz-Olivier Giesbert was editorial director of Le Figaro from 1998 to 2000.

In 2006, Le Figaro was banned in Egypt and Tunisia for publishing articles allegedly insulting Islam.

Le Figaro switched to Berliner format in 2009. The paper has published The New York Times International Weekly on Friday since 2009, an 8-page supplement featuring a selection of articles from The New York Times translated into French. In 2010, Lefigaro.fr created a section called Le Figaro in English, which provides the global English-speaking community with daily original or translated content from Le Figaro's website. The section ended in 2012.

In the 2010s, Le Figaro saw future presidential candidate Éric Zemmour's columns garner great interest among readers that would later serve to launch his political career.

== Logo ==
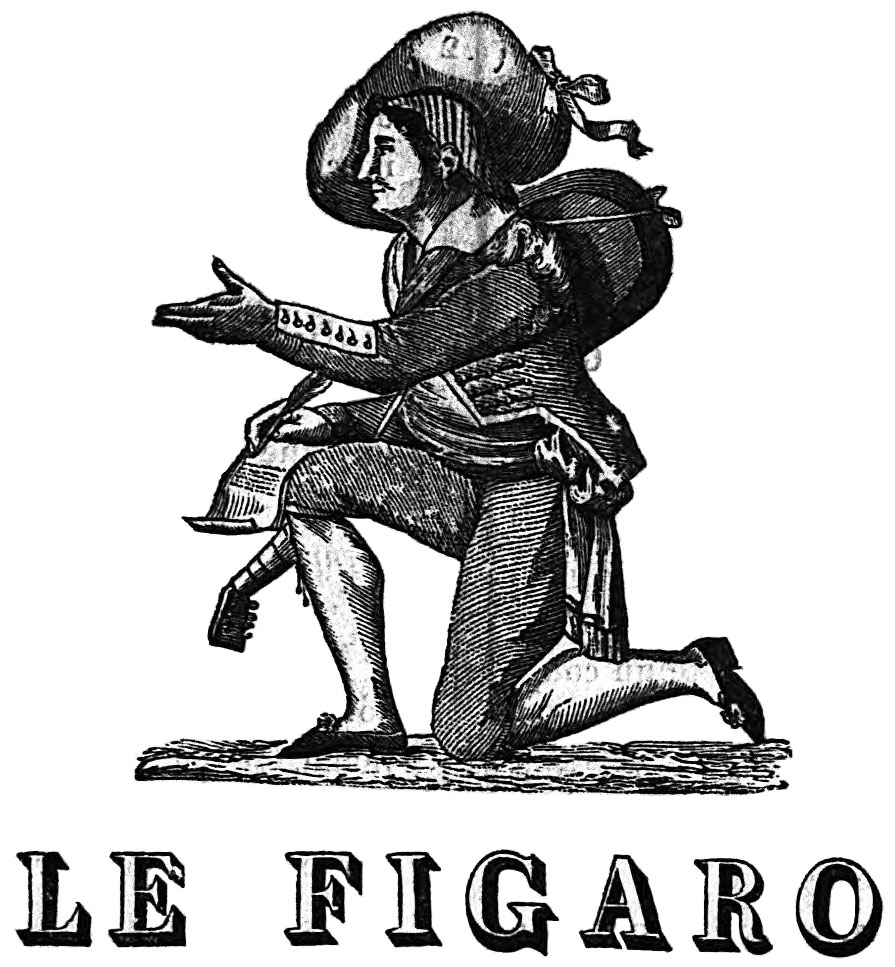
Logo during the 1820s

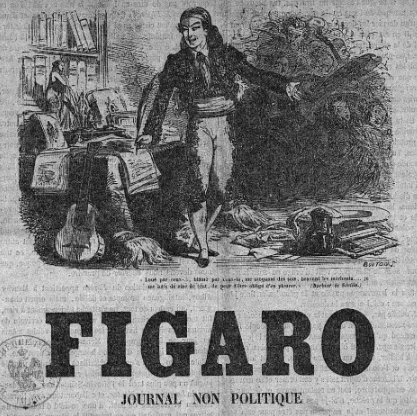
Logo from an 1854 issue

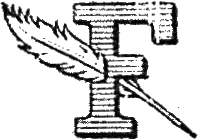
Logo since the 1920s

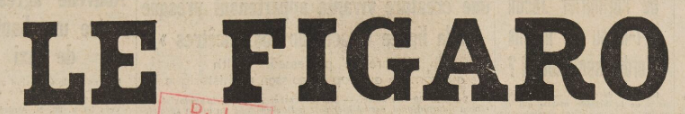
Logo of Le Figaro from a 1952 issue

== Editorial stance and controversies ==
Le Figaro has traditionally held a conservative editorial stance, becoming the voice of the French upper and middle classes.

The newspaper's ownership by Serge Dassault was a source of controversy in terms of conflict-of-interest, as Dassault also owned a major military supplier and served in political positions from the Union for a Popular Movement party. His son Olivier Dassault served as a member of the French National Assembly. Dassault has remarked in an interview in 2004 on the public radio station France Inter that "newspapers must promulgate healthy ideas" and that "left-wing ideas are not healthy ideas."

In February 2012, a general assembly of the newspaper's journalists adopted a motion accusing the paper's managing editor, Étienne Mougeotte, of having made Le Figaro into the "bulletin" of the governing party, the Union for a Popular Movement, of the government and of President Nicolas Sarkozy. They requested more pluralism and "honesty" and accused the paper of one-sided political reporting. Mougeotte had previously said that Le Figaro would do nothing to embarrass the government and the right. Mougeotte publicly replied: "Our editorial line pleases our readers as it is, it works. I don't see why I should change it. [...] We are a right-wing newspaper and we express it clearly, by the way. Our readers know it, our journalists too. There's nothing new to that!"

== Circulation history ==
In the period of 1995–96, the paper had a circulation of 391,533 copies, behind Le Parisien's 451,159 copies.

Year	1999	2000	2001	2002	2003	2004	2005	2006	2007	2008	2009	2010
Circulation	366,690	360,909	366,529	369,108	369,706	365,083	337,118	332,818	338,618	330,482	323,991	325,509

Year	2011	2012	2013	2014	2015	2016	2017	2018	2019	2020
Circulation	329,367	330,952	324,170	320,732	317,152	311,127	312,994	313,694	329,462	331,927

=== Partnerships ===
The newspaper has maintained partnerships with Chinese state media. Until 2020, Le Figaro published inserts from China Daily. In April 2025, it agreed to strengthen "communication and coordination" with Xinhua News Agency.

== See also ==
- Le Monde
- Libération
- Madame Figaro
