= France-Antilles =

French-language daily newspaper

- Owner: Presse Antilles Guyane
- Founded: March 24, 1964; 61 years ago
- Language: French
- Headquarters: Fort de France
- ISSN: 2271-0698
- Website: www.franceantilles.fr

France-Antilles is a daily, French-language newspaper published in Guadeloupe and Martinique. The newspaper is owned by Presse Antilles Guyane. It was formerly owned by Groupe Hersant Média. France-Antilles also publishes a sister publication in French Guiana called France-Guyane. The newspaper was created in 1964 and published its first edition on March 24, 1964. Aude-Jacques Ruettard became owner of the newspaper in June 2017. The Commercial Court of Fort-de-France announced its liquidation on January 30, 2020.
