= Le Dauphiné libéré =

French daily regional newspaper

- Type: Daily newspaper
- Format: Broadsheet
- Founded: 1945; 80 years ago
- Headquarters: Grenoble
- Country: France
- Circulation: 176,711 (2020)
- ISSN: 0220-8261 (print); 2274-5793 (web)
- Website: www.ledauphine.com

Le Dauphiné libéré (French pronunciation: [lə dofine libeʁe]) is a provincial daily French newspaper known for its emphasis on local news and events. The paper is published in Grenoble, France.

== History and profile ==
Founded in 1945, it takes the name from the former province of Dauphiné. Le Dauphiné libéré is produced in 24 different editions covering events in eight French departments, mainly in the region Rhône-Alpes:

- Ain (Pays de Gex only)
- Hautes-Alpes (in Provence-Alpes-Côte d'Azur)
- Ardèche
- Drôme
- Isère
- Savoie
- Haute-Savoie
- Vaucluse (in Provence-Alpes-Côte d'Azur)

The paper is published in broadsheet format. The print service is in Veurey-Voroize in the agglomeration of Grenoble. Until 2010 Le Dauphiné libéré organised the Critérium du Dauphiné Libéré, an important race in the lead-up to the Tour de France. The race then became the Critérium du Dauphiné.

== Circulation ==
The 1998 circulation of Le Dauphiné libéré was 259,000 copies. The paper had a circulation of 259,000 copies both in 2001 and in 2003. The circulation of the paper was 213,664 copies in 2014 and 177,711 copies in 2020.

== Critérium du Dauphiné ==
In 1947, a bicycle race was created by Le Dauphiné libéré to promote its circulation. After World War II, as cycling recovered from a universal five- or six-year hiatus, the Grenoble-based newspaper decided to create and organize a cycling stage race covering the Dauphiné region. This led to the creation of the Critérium du Dauphiné Libéré, an annual cycling road race in the Dauphiné region. The race is run over eight days during the first half of June. It is part of the UCI World Tour calendar and counts as one of the foremost races in the lead-up to the Tour de France in July, along with the Tour de Suisse in the latter half of June. In 2010, the race was rebranded as the Critérium du Dauphiné, before being rebranded again for 2026 onwards as Tour Auvergne-Rhône-Alpes, owing to a partnership with the local region of Auvergne-Rhône-Alpes that hosts the event.
