= La Dépêche de Tahiti =

La Dépèche de Tahiti (French pronunciation: [la depɛʃ də ta.iti], The Tahiti Dispatch) was a daily, French-language newspaper published in French Polynesia. The newspaper, which was founded in 1964, was headquartered in Tahiti.

The newspaper was liquidated in October 2020.
