= Dernières Nouvelles d'Alsace =

French regional daily newspaper

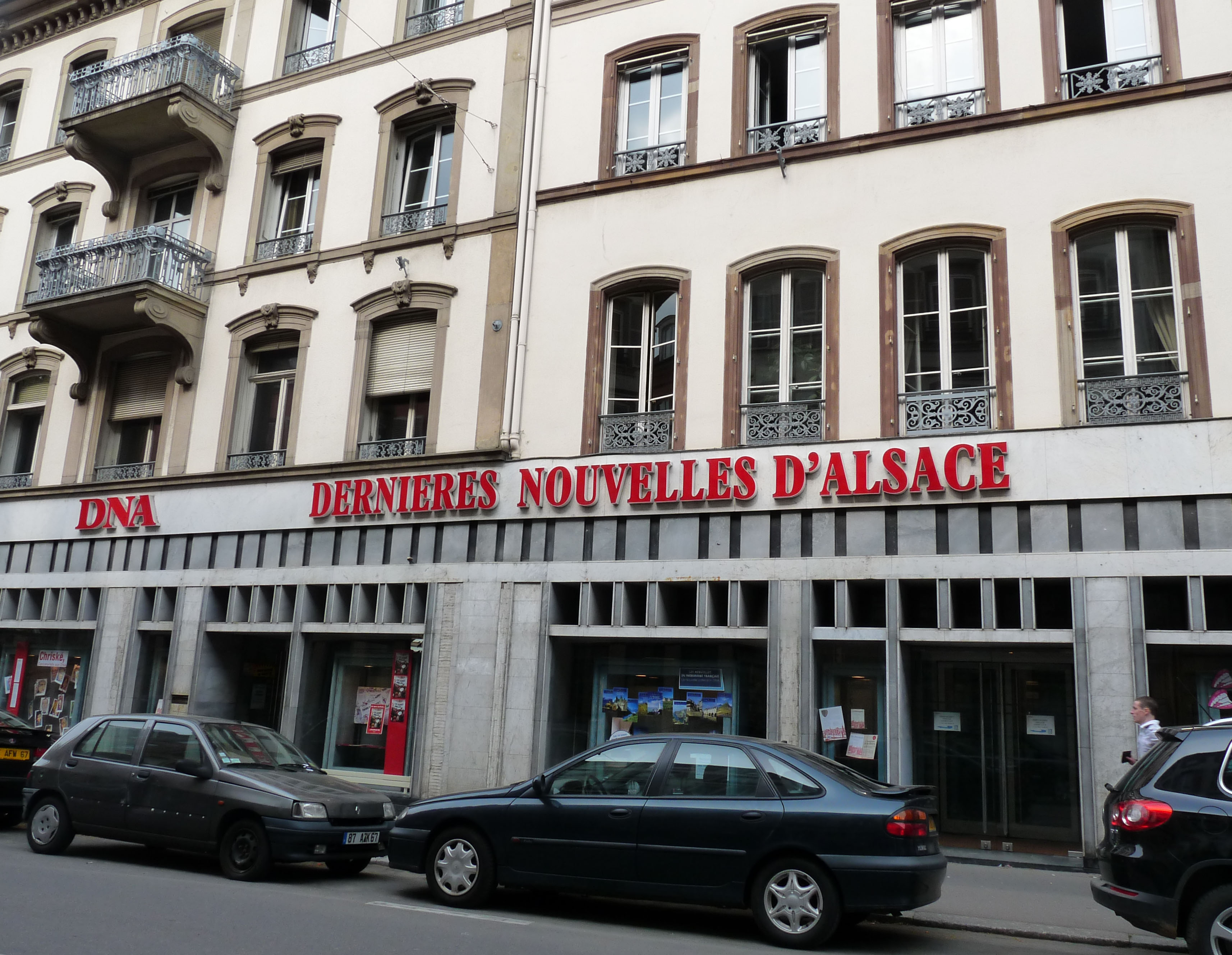
- The DNA's headquarters in Strasbourg
- Native name: Elsässische Neueste Nachrichten
- Type: Daily
- Owner: Crédit Mutuel
- Founder: Heinrich Ludwig Kayser
- Publisher: Laurent Couronne
- Editor-in-chief: Frédéric Vézard
- Former title: Neueste Nachrichten
- Founded: 1877
- Language: German/French
- Headquarters: 17 rue de la Nuée-Bleue
- City: Strasbourg
- Country: France
- Circulation: 127,957 (as of 2020)
- Sister newspapers: Rheinblick
- ISSN: 0150-391X
- Website: dna.fr

The Dernières Nouvelles d'Alsace (French pronunciation: [le dɛʁnjɛʁ nuvɛl dalzas]), commonly known as DNA, is a regional daily French newspaper covering the Alsace region.

== History and profile ==
The DNA was created in November 1877 as Neueste Nachrichten by German Heinrich Ludwig Kayser. It is part of the East Burgundy group Rhone Alpes (EBRA), formerly France or East Media Group Est Républicain. Its principal owner is the press trust of the French bank Crédit Mutuel. Its headquarters is located at 17 rue de la Nuée-Bleue in Strasbourg since 13 July 1891.

The DNA employs about 850 staff and 200 journalists in the Upper Rhine and Lower Rhine. In 1995, it became the first French daily newspaper to have an online presence.

Its daily circulation in December 2009 was 180,000 copies, 85% of subscriptions, making it the first newspaper in Alsace. It includes 18 local editions which is a record for a zone of restricted diffusion. The newspaper was, until March 2012, also published in Standard German, although the Alsatian dialect is not a written language for the Alsatian Germans (about 10% prints). Its daily circulation in 2020 was 127,957 copies.
