= Le Maine libre =

French daily newspaper

- Type: Daily newspaper
- Format: Berliner
- Owner: Groupe SIPA Ouest-France
- Founded: 1944; 82 years ago
- Language: French
- Headquarters: Le Mans, France
- ISSN: 0246-4225
- Website: ouest-france.fr/le-maine-libre

Le Maine libre (French pronunciation: [lə mɛn libʁ]) is a French daily newspaper from Sarthe created in 1944. It is published seven days a week, and has three different geographical editions. It is headquartered in Le Mans.

Le Maine libre is part of the newspaper conglomerate "Les journaux de la Loire", owned by Groupe SIPA Ouest-France. An online edition is available.

== Direction ==
- CEO: Matthieu Fuchs
- Chief editor: Jérôme Glaize

== Circulation ==
Years	2001	2002	2003	2004	2005	2006	2007	2008
Circulation	48,926	47,828	47,837	47,344	46,912	47,436	47,007	46,320
