= Le Journal de la Haute-Marne =

French daily newspaper

- Format: 280 × 430 mm, tabloïd
- Owner(s): L'Est Républicain 50%, Haute-Marne Libérée Holding 50%
- Founded: 1807; 219 years ago
- Language: French
- City: Chaumont
- Country: France
- Circulation: 16,462 (as of 2023)
- ISSN: 1168-9668
- Website: http://www.jhm.fr/

Le Journal de la Haute-Marne (JHM) (French pronunciation: [lə ʒuʁnal də la ot maʁn]; lit. 'The newspaper of Haute-Marne') is a French daily newspaper published in the Haute-Marne department of France. It had a total circulation of 16,462 in 2023.

== History ==
=== 19th-century beginnings ===
Le Journal de la Haute-Marne was launched in 1807 and printed in Chaumont. It was almost entirely written by lawyer Jean-Joseph Pothier. After his death in 1810, his son and business partners disputed the ownership of the newspaper. During the July Monarchy, it merged with L'Écho de la Haute-Marne, and was published under the latter's name until 1906.

=== From La Haute-Marne Libérée to a press group ===
In September 1944, at the time of the liberation of France, Gilbert Bletner founded a new newspaper under the name of La Haute-Marne Libérée.

In 1968, La Haute-Marne Libérée partered with L'Est Républicain, a newspaper from Nancy, under an economic interest group. Although both newspapers remained separate, they printed at the same place, and mostly shared the same content, apart from the local news pages. At the time, over 20 journalists worked for both of them.

La Haute-Marne Libérée became le Journal de la Haute-Marne in 1993 under the guidance of the founder's son, Jean Bletner, who had been managing the company since the 1960s.

In the 1990s, the Est Républicain group, owner of le Journal de la Haute-Marne, was one of the twelve largest regional newspaper groups in France.

In the 2000s the Est Républicain group was purchased by the press group EBRA, led by the Crédit Mutuel. From then on, Le Journal de la Haute-Marne was integrated in EBRA.

=== The web shift ===
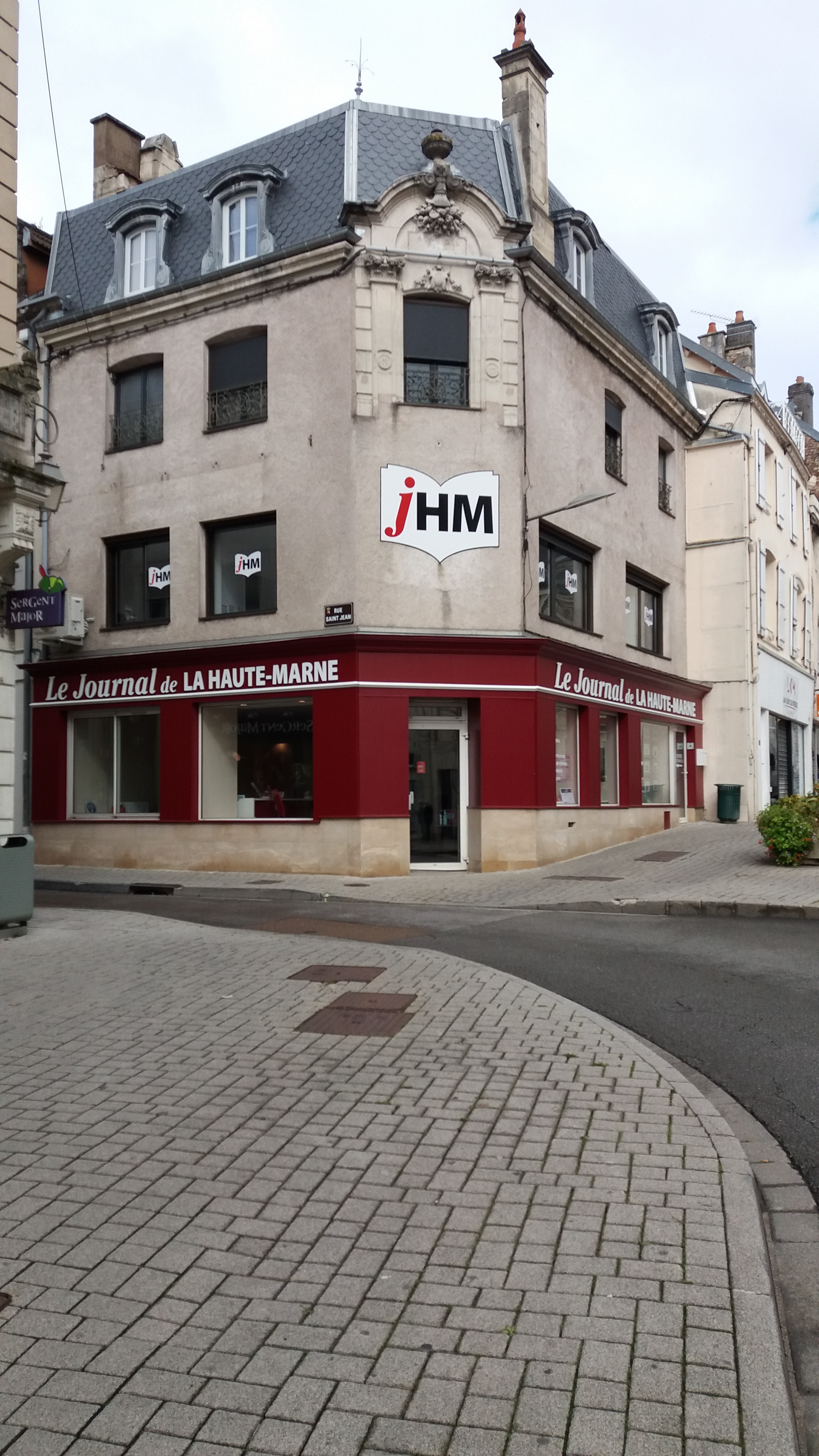
Journal de la Haute-Marne headquarters in Chaumont

In the early 2010s le Journal de la Haute-Marne became one of the pioneers of the advantages of the internet to the press.

At the same time, le Journal de la Haute-Marne got involved in social media, especially Facebook and to a lesser extent on Twitter. In 2011, it ranked among the emerging titles in terms of interaction with web users, and added value on social networks for website linking.

This daily newspaper has over a hundred employees, 30 journalists, a network of 300 correspondents, 320 salespersons, and 150 distributors. The journal's former editor-in-chief, Jean Bletner, died on 31 July 2018.

== Local agencies ==
- Chaumont
- Saint-Dizier
- Langres
