= Le Journal de Saône-et-Loire =

French provincial daily newspaper

Logo of the newspaper Le Journal de Saône-et-Loire

Le Journal de Saône-et-Loire (French pronunciation: [lə ʒuʁnal də son e lwaʁ]) is a French provincial left-wing (as well far-left) daily newspaper for readers of the Saône-et-Loire département. Its headquarters are in Chalon-sur-Saône and it is printed in Chatenoy-le-Royal. It was established on 2 July 1826 in Mâcon.

Circulation in 2020: 46,253 weekday newspapers, 47,913 on Sundays.
