= Job de Roincé =

French journalist and writer

Job de Roincé (Born Joseph Boreau de Roincé, 18 April 1896, Segré, Maine-et-Loire - 30 December 1981), was a French journalist and writer, and also one of the founding figures of Breton nationalism.

== Biography ==
Born in Segré in Maine-et-Loire in 1896, he attended school in Saint-Pol-de-Léon (Finistère). As a teenager, he participated in the birth of Bleun-Brug, the movement of abbot Jean-Marie Perrot. After the First World War, he helped to create the Group of Young Bretons in 1919 with other members of Action Française like Charles Maurras. This movement was the origin of the separatist faction Breiz Atao, which he joined, but quickly left, as their radical views were incompatible with his own conservatism. However he later joined the Breton National Party, advocating for a royalist position.

From a professional point of view, he started his career as a journalist with the journal Le Nouvelliste de Bretagne in Rennes. Between 1925 and 1945, he worked for Courrier de la Mayenne. From 1950, he lived in Rennes as the editor in chief of Nouvelles de Bretagne (post war successor paper of the Nouvelliste). In all, he was an important literary activist, crucial in the regionalist politics and history of the west of France.

== Publications ==
=== Cartoons ===
- La belle histoire de la Duchesse en sabots. Bande dessinée. Series : Collection « À la française » n° 2. Cartoonist : Pierre Rousseau. Director : Job de Roincé. 1942
- La belle histoire de Jean Chouan. Bande dessinée. Series : Collection « À la française » n° 3. Cartoonist: Pierre Rousseau. Director: Job de Roincé. 1942
- La Belle histoire de Surcouf Artistic and literary edition - Paris. 1942. Coll. A la française n°5
- Jacques Cartier, le Christophe Colomb Breton. Artistic and literary edition - Paris. 1942. Coll. A la française n°6
- Le mousse de la Bellecordière Artistic and literary edition 1943. Coll.A la française
- Le mystère du château du Taureau. Ololé Edition - Landerneau. Breton cultural propaganda for youth edition : Urz Goanag Breiz. Containing : "La Peste et le laboureur; Une Affaire grave; Le Miracle de la ruche; L'Ermite qui n'avait plus de feu; Les Moines de Cuburien". 1943.
- Les pirates de l'île aux moines, tomes 1 et 2. Art: Claudel / Written: Job de Roincé. 1946, 1947.

=== Books ===
- Jean Chouan
- Double victoire, (Novel), Mayenne. 1931.
- Un drame au large Pièce en 3 actes . La Voix de l'Ouest - Rennes. 1945.
- Au Pays de Léon, son histoire, ses légendes, ses pardons, Rennes, H. Riou-Reuzé, 1946. My Books Collection.
- Ici Rennes, Rennes, Riou-Reuzé, 1948. History
- Les Heures glorieuses du 41e R.I. X 1965, Complete history of the Fourth Republic from its early days. Further chapters deal with the conquest of Algeria and the wars of 1914-1918 and 1939-1945.
- Charleroi 1914, Rennes, Imprimerie Les Nouvelles, 1967
- Le Livre de l'Armistice : l'Allemagne à Genoux (Novembre 1918), Imprimerie Les Nouvelles, Rennes, 1968.
- La Cuisine rustique. Bretagne, Maine, Anjou, Forcalquier, Morel, 1970. Collaboration with Yvonne Meynier.
- La Bretagne malade de la république, Rennes, imprimerie Les Nouvelles, 1971.
- Le colonel Armand, marquis de la Rouërie, Lanore, Paris, 1975.
- Le drame de Quiberon (1795). Imprimerie ' Les nouvelles ' à Rennes, 1976.
- Histoire de Chouans, Fernand Lanore, 1978.
- Mémorial des martyrs d'Avrillé. Rennes, Les nouvelles, 1979.
- Figures de Chouans, Fernand Lanore, Paris, 1980.
