= Le Nouvelliste =

Le Nouvelliste is the name of:

- Le Nouvelliste (Haiti), a Haitian international newspaper, based in Port-au-Prince, Haiti
- Le Nouvelliste (Quebec), Mauricien regional newspaper, based in Trois-Rivieres, Quebec.
- Le Nouvelliste (Switzerland), Valais regional newspaper, based in Sion, Switzerland.
- Le Nouvelliste de Lyon
- Le Nouvelliste de Bretagne
