= Victor Pierre Le Gorgeu =

French politician

Victor Le Gorgeu
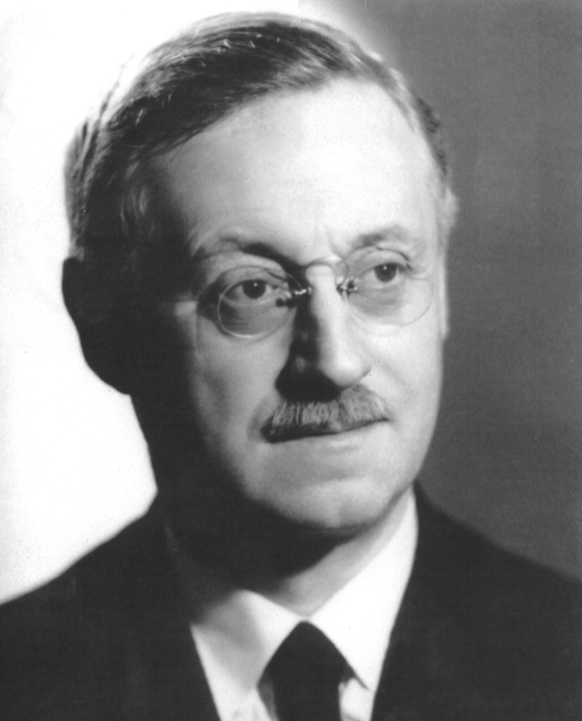
- Le Gorgeu in 1955

Mayor of Brest
- In office 1929–1941
- Preceded by: Maurice Thorez
- Succeeded by: Vichy-appointed administration

Senator for Finistère
- In office 1931–1945

Commissaire Régional de la République for Brittany
- In office 1944–1946

Personal details
- Born: 5 May 1881 Quimper, France
- Died: 11 September 1963 (aged 82) France
- Occupation: Physician, Politician, Resistance figure
- Awards: Légion d'Honneur (Commander, 1952); Croix de Guerre 1914–1918; Médaille de la Résistance with rosette

Victor Le Gorgeu (5 May 1881 – 11 September 1963) was a French physician, politician, and resistance figure during World War II. Born in Quimper he pursued a dual career in medicine and public service.

== Early life and medical career ==
Le Gorgeu graduated as a physician at the École du service de santé des armées in Bordeaux in 1904, earning accolades for his academic performance. He served as a medical officer in the French colonial forces, with postings in Tonkin, Mauritania, and Senegal. In 1911, he left the army and established the first medical analysis laboratory in Brest. During World War I, Le Gorgeu served as a battalion physician and later as head of a field ambulance unit in the Army of the Orient.

== Political career ==
Le Gorgeu entered politics in 1919, becoming a departmental councilor for Finistère and from 1929 as a modernising mayor of Brest which was brought to an end in 1941 by his refusal to vote on an address of confidence to Marshal Petain. He was also the joint owner of the newspaper La Dépêche de Brest.

Elected senator for Finistère in 1931, he represented the Gauche Démocratique group until 1945. He also served as Sous-secrétaire d'État for Education in 1933–1934, advocating for expanded access to education and vocational training.

== Resistance activities and postwar roles ==
An outspoken opponent of the Vichy government, Le Gorgeu was one of 80 parliamentarians to vote against granting full powers to Philippe Pétain in 1940. After being arrested, he left Brest for Sarthe and joined the resistance. In 1943, Charles de Gaulle appointed him Commissaire Régional de la République for Brittany to oversee liberation efforts. He helped set up Le Télégramme a regional newspaper to replace Dépêche de Brest which Le Gorgeu had lost control for his and the papers criticism of Vichy.

After the war, he served as President of the Jury for the first class of the École nationale d'administration (ENA) and held various positions, including President of the Conseil supérieur de la Marine marchande and member of the Académie de Marine.

== Legacy and honors ==
Le Gorgeu was decorated with the Legion of Honour (commander, 1952), the Croix de Guerre 1914-1918, and the Resistance Medal with rosette. Streets in Brest, Quimper, and Rennes bear his name, and the residence at the École des hautes études en santé publique (EHESP) is named in his honor.
