= Hutin =

Hutin is a French surname meaning "the quarreler" and may refer to:

- Charles Francois Hutin (1715–1776), French painter
- Christian Hutin (born 1961), French politician
- François Hutin (1686–1758), French painter, sculptor and engraver
- Madeleine Hutin (1898–1989), better known as Little Sister Magdeleine of Jesus, French nun
- Paul Hutin-Desgrées (1888–1975), French journalist and politician
- Serge Hutin (1927–1997), French author
- Stanislas Hutin (1930–2026), French Jesuit seminarian and anti-war activist

== See also ==
- Hutin Britton (1876–1965), English actress
- Louis X of France (1289–1316) was called "Le Hutin"
- Hutin, Croatia, a village near Krašić, Croatia
