= Henry Dreyfus =

Henry Dreyfus may refer to:

- Henri Dreyfus (1882–1944), Swiss chemist and co-inventor of Celanese
  - The Camille and Henry Dreyfus Foundation
- Henry Dreyfuss (1904–1972), American industrial designer
- Henri Fursy (real name Henri Dreyfus, 1866–1929), French cabaret singer, director and lyricist.
