= Arthur Dessoye =

French journalist, writer, industrialist and politician

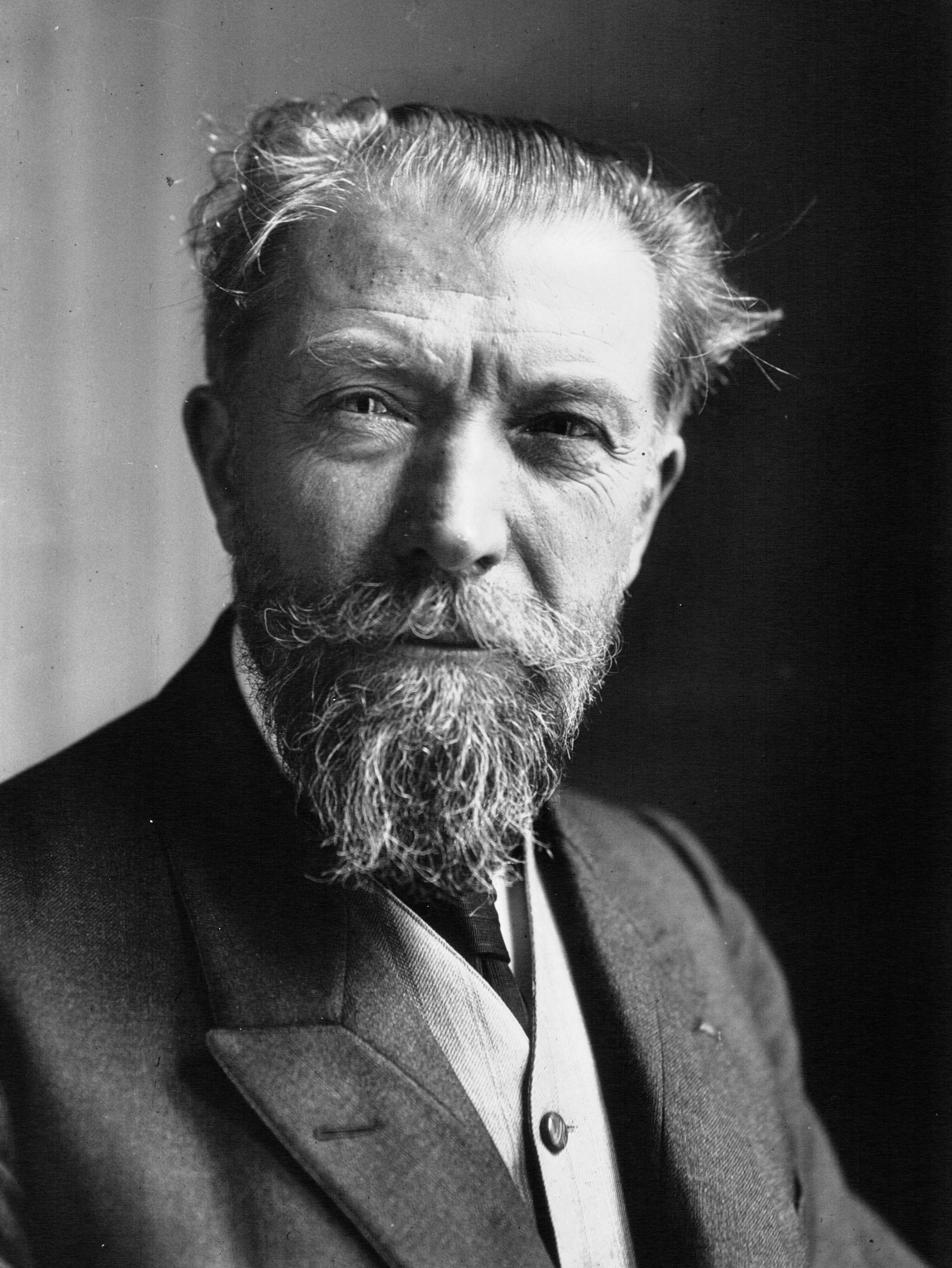
- Arthur Charles Dessoye, Deputy and Minister (1914).

French Deputy
- In office 1 June 1906 – 7 December 1919
- Preceded by: Charles Bourlon de Rouvre
- Succeeded by: Constituency abolished
- Parliamentary group: Radical Left
- Constituency: Haute-Marne

General Councillor of Haute-Marne
- In office 1904–1919
- Preceded by: Alfred Lamarche
- Succeeded by: Emile Telliez
- Constituency: Canton of Bourmont

Minister of Public Instruction and Fine Arts
- In office 9 June 1914 – 13 June 1914
- Prime Minister: Alexandre Ribot
- Preceded by: René Viviani
- Succeeded by: Jean-Victor Augagneur

Personal details
- Born: Arthur Charles Sébastien Dessoye; 23 August 1854 Auberive
- Died: 30 April 1927 (aged 72) Breuvannes-en-Bassigny
- Party: Radical Socialist
- Profession: Journalist

Arthur Charles Dessoye (23 August 1854 in Auberive, Haute-Marne – 30 April 1927 in Breuvannes-en-Bassigny, Haute-Marne) was a French journalist, writer, industrialist, and politician.

== Biography ==
=== Journalism career ===
Born to a tax collector father, originally from Breuvannes-en-Bassigny, where his family owned a file manufacturing business established in 1827, Arthur Dessoye was one of the founders and editor-in-chief of La Dépêche de Brest et de l'Ouest from 19 November 1886 to 12 April 1897.

- Editor of L'Électeur libre de Chaumont until 1884;
- Editor-in-chief of L'Union Républicaine du Finistère, a tri-weekly four-page newspaper, from 1 April 1884 until 18 November 1886;
- Editor-in-chief of La Dépêche de Brest et de l'Ouest from its creation in 1886 until 1897, succeeding L'Union Républicaine du Finistère.

He married Marie Eugènie Renard in Breuvannes-en-Bassigny on 2 August 1884. One of his witnesses was his friend Jean Macé.

=== Political career ===
- Elected general councillor of the Canton of Bourmont from 1904 to 1919, also serving as mayor of Breuvannes
- Elected deputy for Haute-Marne from 1906 to 1919;
- President of the Ligue de l'enseignement from 1906 to 1919;
- Minister of Public Instruction and Fine Arts from 9 June to 13 June 1914 in the fourth Government of Alexandre Ribot;
- Advocate of electoral reform, he sponsored the law on list voting, enacted on 12 July 1919.

== Honours ==
- Knight of the Legion of Honour on 26 June 1896.
