= Aignan =

Aignan may refer to:

- Aignan, Gers, a commune of France
- Aignan of Orleans (358–453), Bishop of Orleans, canonized
- Nicolas Dupont-Aignan (born 1961), French politician
