= La Dépêche de Brest =

French regional daily newspaper

La Dépêche de Brest et de l'Ouest
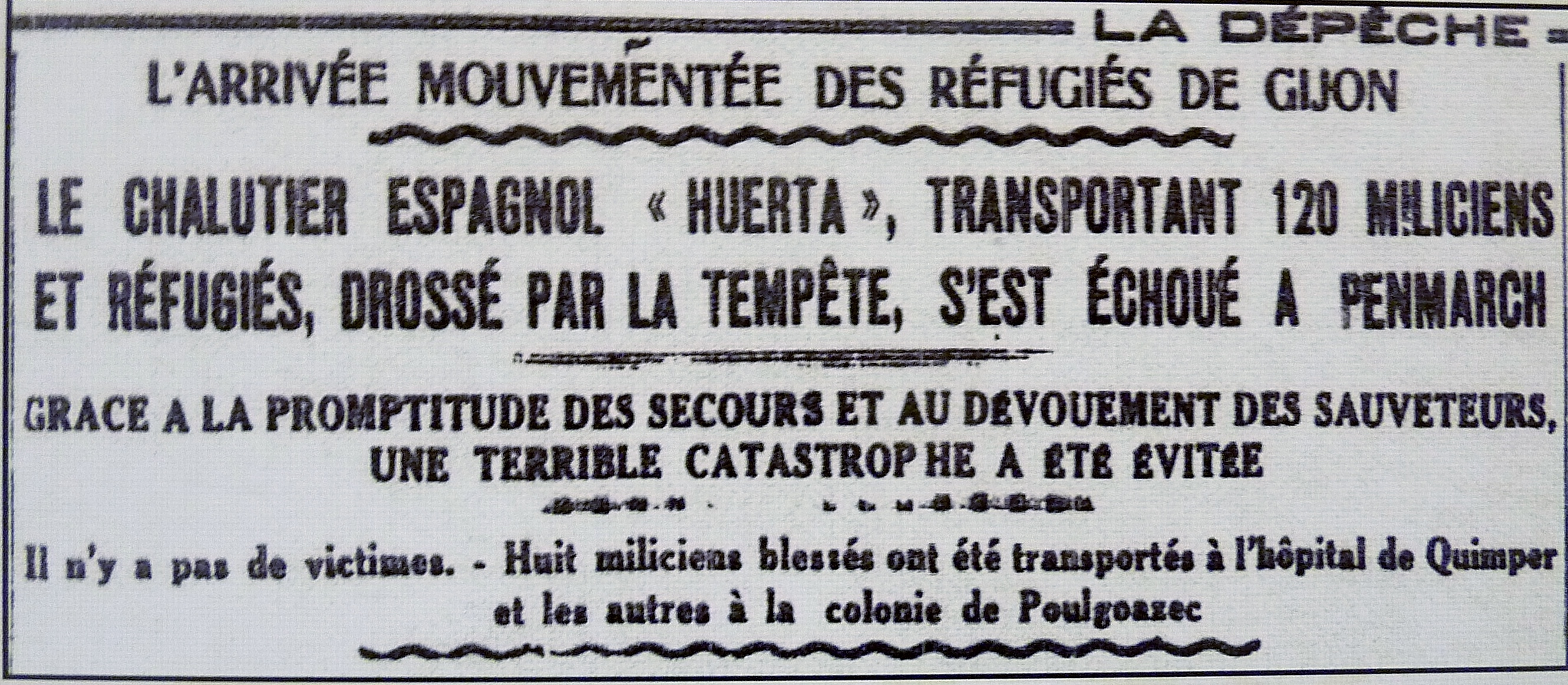
- An excerpt from the newspaper
- Founder(s): Arthur Dessoye
- Language: French
- Ceased publication: 17 August 1944
- Headquarters: Brest
- Circulation: 60000
- ISSN: 2125-7531

La Dépêche de Brest et de l'Ouest was a French regional daily newspaper published in Brest, France, later relocated to Morlaix, and circulated from 1886 to 1944.

== History ==
The newspaper was founded in Brest by Arthur Dessoye on 18 November 1886.

It was successively managed by Louis Coudurier and later his son Marcel Coudurier. Following the Allied bombings on Brest, the newspaper, originally headquartered in Place Wilson, was moved to Morlaix in 1941.

Until March 1942, under the direction of Marcel Coudurier, who was co-proprietor with Victor Le Gorgeu, the newspaper was sceptical towards Vichy policies. However, under pressure from the German occupiers, who threatened to suspend the newspaper, Yann Fouéré took over as director in March 1942. From that point, the newspaper adopted a more pro-Vichy and collaborationist stance.

It ceased publication on 17 August 1944. In September 1944, the newspaper was banned for collaboration with Germany and was replaced by Le Télégramme.

== Archives ==
The archives of La Dépêche de Brest et de l'Ouest have been available online since 1 January 2013, thanks to a joint effort by the Brest archives and the newspaper Le Télégramme. Nearly 120,000 pages were digitized over five months and made accessible to the public.

== Bibliography ==
- Jean-Pierre Coudurier, La Dépêche de Brest : naissance et avatars d'un journal de province témoin de son temps, 1999, Éditions Le Télégramme, ISBN 2909292479
- Georges Cadiou, La Presse bretonne dans la collaboration, 1940–1944, Fouesnant, Yoran embanner, 2022.
