= Congregation of the Gentlemen of Lyon =

- Congrégation des Messieurs de Lyon
- Formation: 1802
- Founder: Benoît Coste
- Type: Catholic congregation
- Purpose: Religious, charitable, educational, and political activities
- Headquarters: Lyon, France

The Congregation of the Gentlemen of Lyon (French: Congrégation des Messieurs de Lyon) is a Catholic organization with a counter-revolutionary ethos. It was founded in 1802 and was particularly active in Lyon during the late 19th and early 20th centuries, focusing on religious, charitable, educational, and political initiatives.

== A Catholic congregation ==
=== Counter-Revolutionary Inspiration ===
The violent repression of the Revolt of Lyon against the National Convention in 1793 deeply affected the city of Lyon, fostering a "Catholicism of refusal" during the Napoleonic era. This movement was inspired by the memory of revolutionary repression and loyalty to the Legitimist cause.

On July 28, 1802, seven young men, led by stockbroker Benoît Coste, created a Sodality of Our Lady under the spiritual guidance of Jesuit Pierre Roger. Known as the Congregation of the Gentlemen of Lyon, its spiritual activities included sacraments, prayers, and retreats, combined with an apostolic mission aimed at saving souls through social and charitable action and defending the Church by re-Christianizing elites. Initially comprising only a few dozen members, the congregation grew under the First French Empire. In 1809, it clandestinely printed and distributed the papal bull excommunicating Napoleon. During the Canut revolts of 1831, Benoît Coste joined the barricades alongside the canuts to defend fair wages and employment.

=== A "Catholic Freemasonry" ===
Reorganized in 1817, the Congregation was led by a prefect elected from among its members and operated through various sections focusing on education, charity, and religious instruction. Its activities included aid for the poor, visiting the sick at home or in hospitals, prison outreach, catechism instruction, evening classes, and literacy programs for workers.

The Congregation grew while maintaining an elite recruitment policy. Membership increased from 160 in 1830 to 300 in 1850 and remained steady at around 200 by 1945, drawn primarily from Lyon's Catholic nobility and bourgeoisie. Recruitment occurred by co-option, and members maintained secrecy about their affiliation. This led to the Congregation being likened to a "Catholic Freemasonry" that became a breeding ground for counter-revolutionary Catholic elites aligned with Ultramontanism and monarchism.

The congregation's spiritual direction was provided by Jesuits, including Pierre Roger (1802), Joseph de Jocas (1852–1880), Ambroise Monnot (1881–1895), François Varillon, and others. Most members were alumni of Jesuit schools such as Lycée Notre-Dame de Mongré, Institution salésienne Notre-Dame des Minimes, or Externat Saint-Joseph.

== Influence in Lyonese society ==
Two members of the Congregation, Prosper Dugas and Baron Amédée Chaurand, founded the Lyon Circle in 1868, a legitimist institution located at Place Bellecour. The Circle was described as "an annex of the Congregation" due to its composition and religious orientation.

The Congregation also contributed to the founding of the Catholic University of Lyon in 1875. Influential members such as Lucien Brun, Prosper Dugas, and Joseph Rambaud played key roles in the university's creation. It also supported free education during the Republican educational reforms.

The Congregation's positions were championed in the daily newspaper Le Nouvelliste de Lyon, founded and directed by Joseph Rambaud from 1879. Many Congregation members were shareholders of the paper.

Additionally, the Congregation was active in the agrarian movement, particularly through the Union du Sud-Est des syndicats agricoles, which resisted the Republicanization of rural areas.

== Contributions to Catholic Action in Lyon ==
The Congregation was primarily centered in the Ainay neighborhood of Lyon's 2nd arrondissement, hosting institutions such as the Lyon Circle, the Jesuit residence, the Externat Saint-Joseph, Le Nouvelliste de Lyon, and the Union du Sud-Est des syndicats agricoles.

Key contributions included:

- Founding of the Society for the Propagation of the Faith in 1822 by Pauline Jaricot, whose brothers were members.
- Launching the St. Vincent de Paul Conferences in Lyon in 1836 by Frédéric Ozanam.
- Construction of the Basilica of Notre-Dame de Fourvière through the 1853 Fourvière Commission.
- Establishing the Lyon Circle in 1868.
- Founding the Catholic University of Lyon in 1875.
- Supporting free education under Jules Ferry.

== Legacy ==
The Congregation's influence peaked between 1860 and 1920, perpetuating an intransigent political culture in Lyon until the mid-20th century. Though it lost prominence after World War II, it continued its religious and social mission until the 1960s.
