= Sem (artist) =

French caricaturist (1863–1934)

Georges Goursat
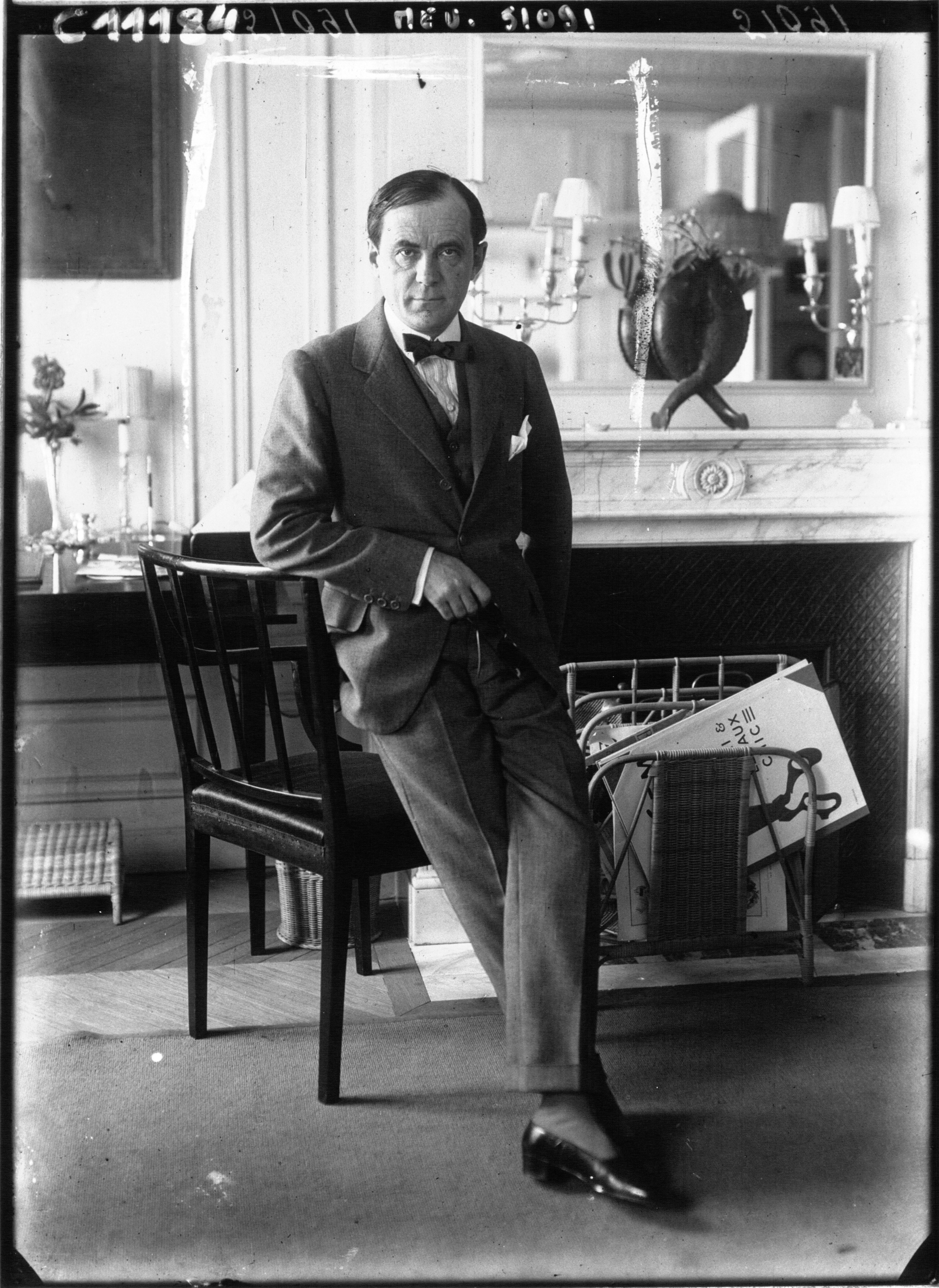
- Born: 23 November 1863; Périgueux
- Died: 26 November 1934 (aged 71); Paris
- Other name: Sem
- Occupation: artist
- Known for: caricatures, posters

Georges Goursat (23 November 1863 – 26 November 1934), known as Sem, was a French caricaturist famous during the Belle Époque.

== Life and works ==
=== Youth (1863–1900) ===
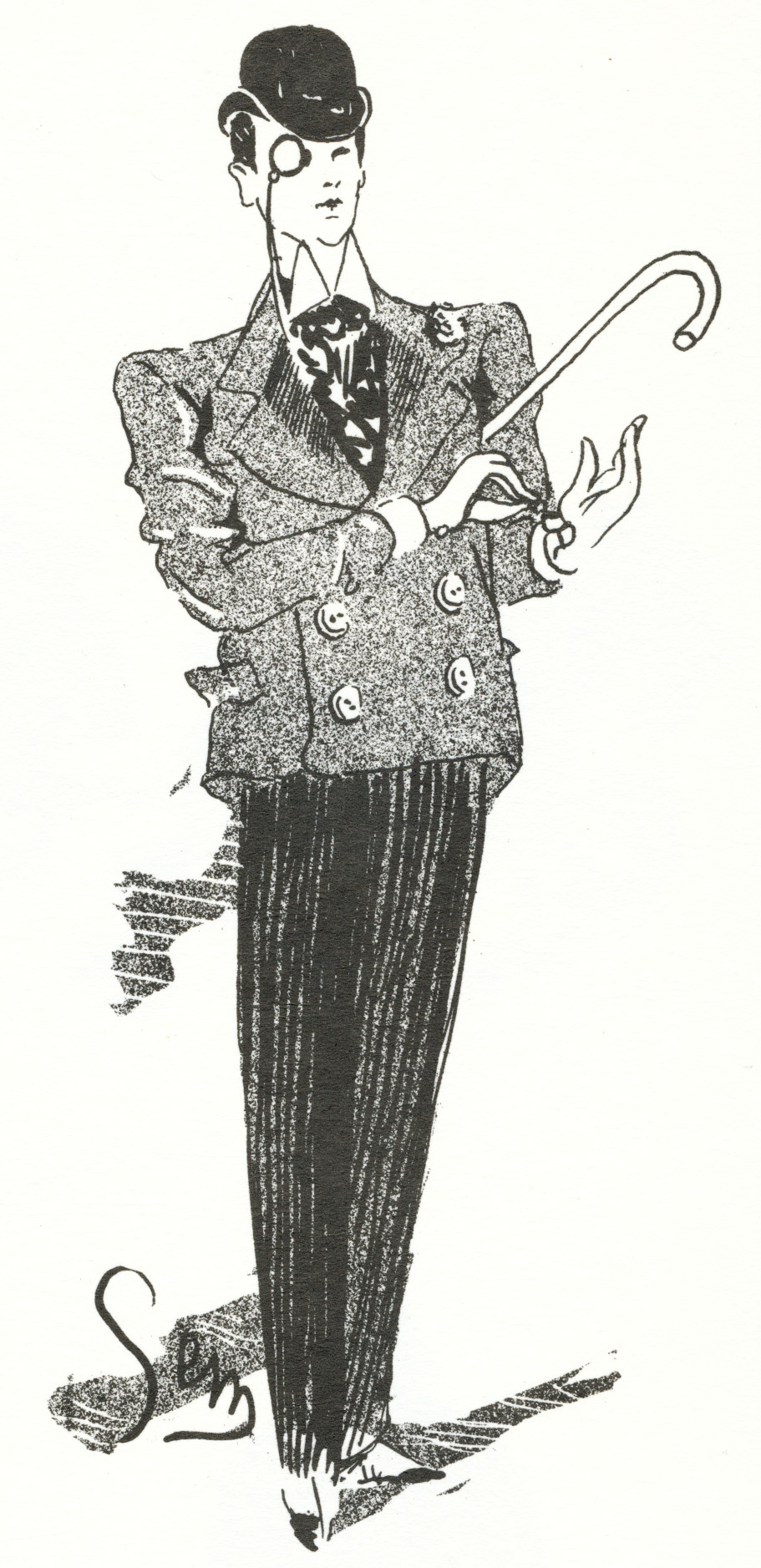
Self portrait (1888) (signed as "SEM")

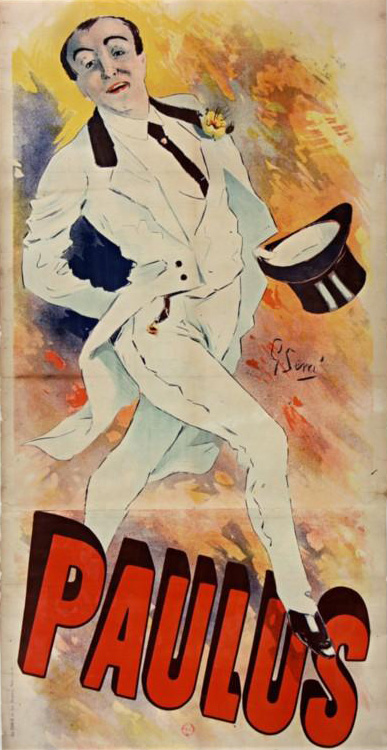
Goursat's first poster (1891) for the singer Paulus

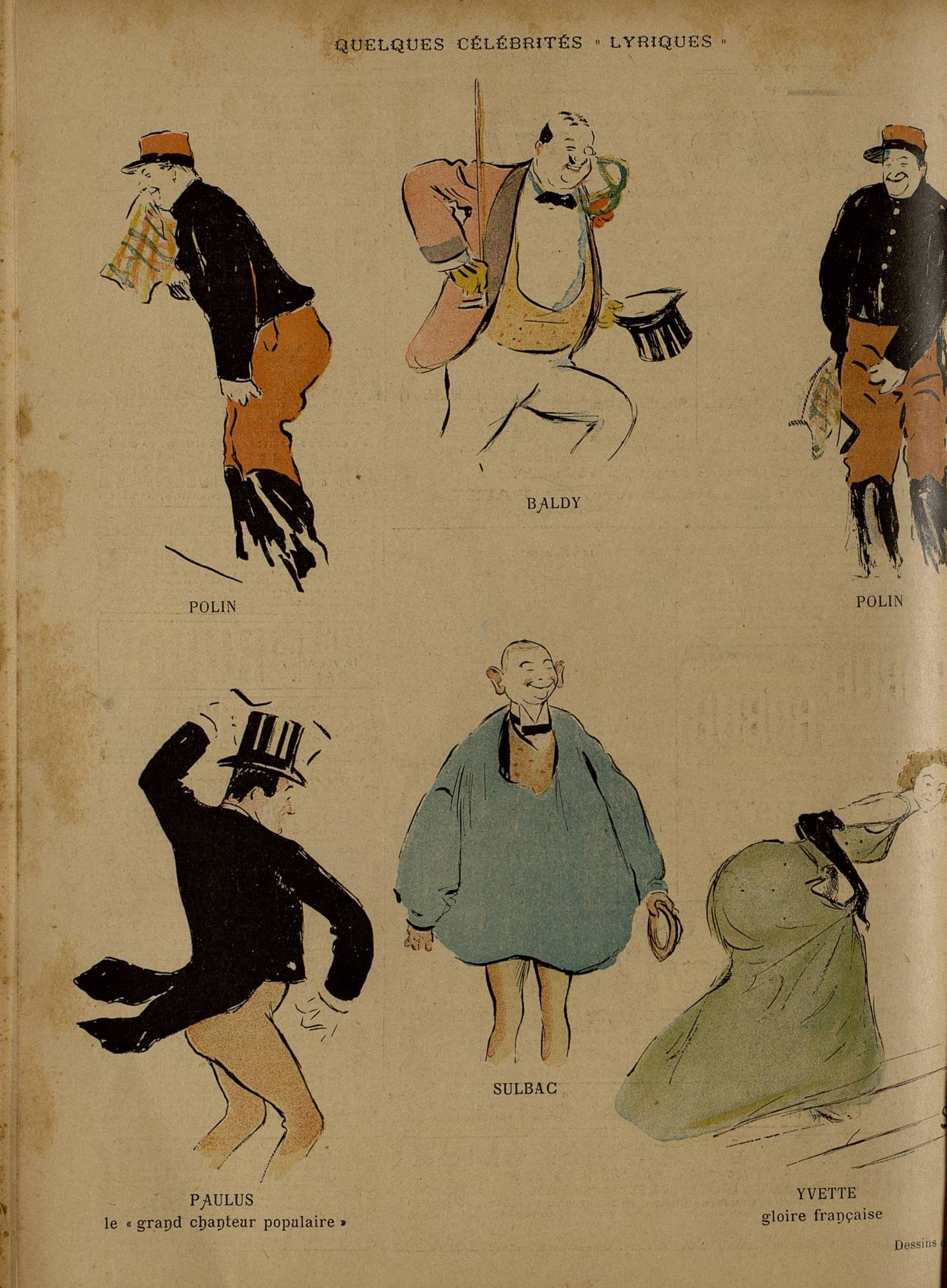
First caricatures in Le Rire (1897).

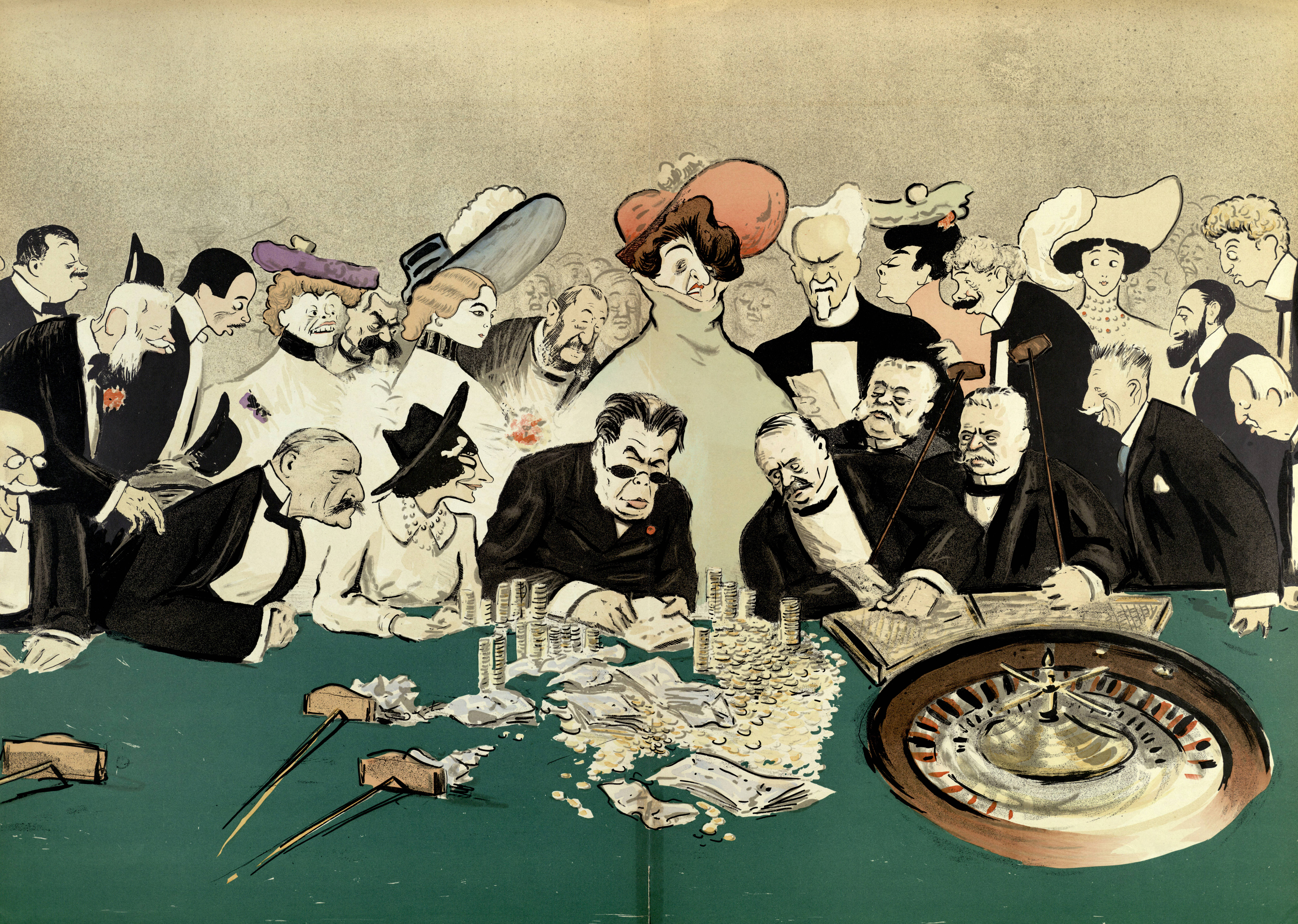
Caricature of various individuals playing roulette by Sem, 1920

Georges Goursat was born and raised in an upper-middle-class family from Périgueux. The wealth inherited from his father at the age of 21 allowed him to sustain a gilded youth.

In 1888 he self-published his first three albums of caricatures in Périgueux, signing some as "SEM", allegedly as a tribute to Amédée de Noé who signed his caricatures for Le Monde illustré as "Cham".

He settled in Bordeaux from 1890 to 1898. During this period, he published more albums and his first press caricatures in La Petite Gironde and discovered the work of Leonetto Cappiello. His style matured, becoming both simpler and more precise.

During the same period, he made trips to Paris. In 1891, he designed two posters printed in Jules Chéret's workshop for the singer Paulus. He published his first caricatures of artists in L'Illustration (Albert Brasseur) and Le Rire (Paulus, Polin and Yvette Guilbert (Note: Base Joconde: Les demi-vieilles, French Ministry of Culture. (in French))).

Goursat lived in Marseille from 1898 to 1900, where he met Jean Lorrain who convinced him to live in Paris.

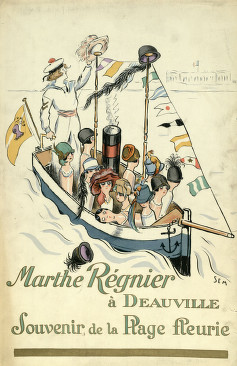
Caricature women on a boat being sailed by a sailor by Sem, 1925

=== Belle Époque (1900–1914) ===
Goursat arrived in Paris in March 1900 at the time of the Universal Exposition opening.

He chose horse racing as a way to enter high society. In June 1900 he self-published his new album Le Turf of caricatures of many prominent Parisian socialites, including Marquess Boni de Castellane, Prince Trubetskoy, Count Clermont-Tonnerre, Baron Alphonse, Gustave de Rothschild, and Polaire. The album's success made him famous overnight. In October 1900 he published the album Paris-Trouville with equal success. Goursat published nine other albums before 1913.

In 1904, Goursat received the Légion d'honneur. In 1909, he exhibited with the painter Auguste Roubille, first in Paris and then in Monte Carlo and London. The exhibit included a diorama composed of hundreds of wooden figurines "of all the merely Paris celebrities".

=== World War I (1914–1918) ===
Goursat was not drafted in World War I as he was over 50 years old at the start of the war. He nevertheless involved himself as a war correspondent for Le Journal. Some of his rather "chauvinistic" articles had an "enormous impact". Ten articles were published in 1917 in Un pékin sur le front. Two other articles were incorporated in the 1923 book La Ronde de Nuit. In 1916 and 1918 Goursat published two albums of Croquis de Guerre (War Sketches) with a completely different style than his previous work. He also designed war bond posters.

=== Années Folles (1918–1934) ===
After the war, Goursat returned to the kind of caricatures that made him famous. In 1919, he published Le Grand Monde à l'envers (High Society Upside Down). Around 1923, he published three albums under the general title of Le Nouveau Monde (transl. The New World). In 1923, he became an officer of the Légion d'honneur.

In 1929, he was severely impoverished by the economic crisis. After a heart attack in 1933, he died in 1934.

== Personalities caricatured by Goursat ==
Name, surname	Occupation	Image
Alexandrovich, Vladimir	Socialite	
Annunzio, Gabriele d'	Writer	
Astruc, Gabriel	Impresario	
Balthy, Louise	Actress	
Bennett, Gordon	Publisher	
Blanc, Edmond	Politician	
Blériot, Louis	Aviator	
Boldini, Giovanni	Painter	
Borbon, Alfonso de	King	
Brasseur, Albert	Actor	
Brieux, Eugène	Writer	
Capel, Arthur "Boy"	Polo player	
Cappiello, Leonetto	Poster artist	
Capus, Alfred	Writer	
Castellane, Boni de	Socialite	
Chanel, Coco	Designer	
Colette, Sidonie-Gabrielle	Writer	
Croisset, Francis de	Dramatist	
Deval, Marguerite	Singer	
Donnay, Maurice	Dramatist	
Doumer, Paul	President	
Ephrussi, Maurice	Financier	
Feydeau, Georges	Writer	
Forain, Jean-Louis	Painter	
Fursy, Henri	Variety singer	
Gauthier-Villars, Henry	Writer	
Guitry, Lucien	Actor	
Guitry, Sacha	Actor	
Guyon, Charles-Alexandre	Actor	
Hahn, Reynaldo	Composer	
Adrien Hébrard	Journalist	
Helleu, Paul	Painter	
Hervieu, Paul	Dramatist	
Humbert, Charles	Senator	
Lambert, Charles de	Aviator	
Lafitte, Pierre	Publisher	
Latham, Hubert	Aviator	
Lavallière, Ève	Actress	
Letellier, Henri	Publisher	
Lorrain, Jean	Writer	
Massenet, Jules	Composer	
Mendès, Catulle	Writer	
Mérode, Cléo de	Dancer	
Montesquiou, Robert de	Poet	
Morand, Paul	Writer	
Noailles, Anna de	Writer	
Noailles, Emmanuel de	Diplomat	
Otero, Caroline	Dancer	
Qajar, Ahmad	Shah	
Paquin, Jeanne	Designer	
Pierpont Morgan, John	Financier	
Poiré, Emmanuel (Caran d'Ache)	Cartoonist	
Polaire	Actress	
Porto-Riche, Georges de	Writer	
Pougy, Liane de	Dancer	
Puccini, Giacomo	Composer	
Rostand, Edmond	Dramatist	
Rostand, Maurice	Writer	
Rougier, Henri	Aviator	
Santos-Dumont, Alberto	Aviator	
Sardou, Victorien	Dramatist	
Vionnet, Madeleine	Designer	
Vlastos, Kostia	Banker	
Wall, Berry	Socialite	

== Bibliography ==
- Bonnelle, Madeleine; Meneret, Marie-José (1979). SEM (in French). Périgueux: Pierre Fanlac. ISBN 2-86577-144-X.
- Dini, Francesca (2006). Boldini, Helleu, Sem : protagonisti e miti della Belle Epoque (in Italian). Skira.
