= Joseph Rambaud =

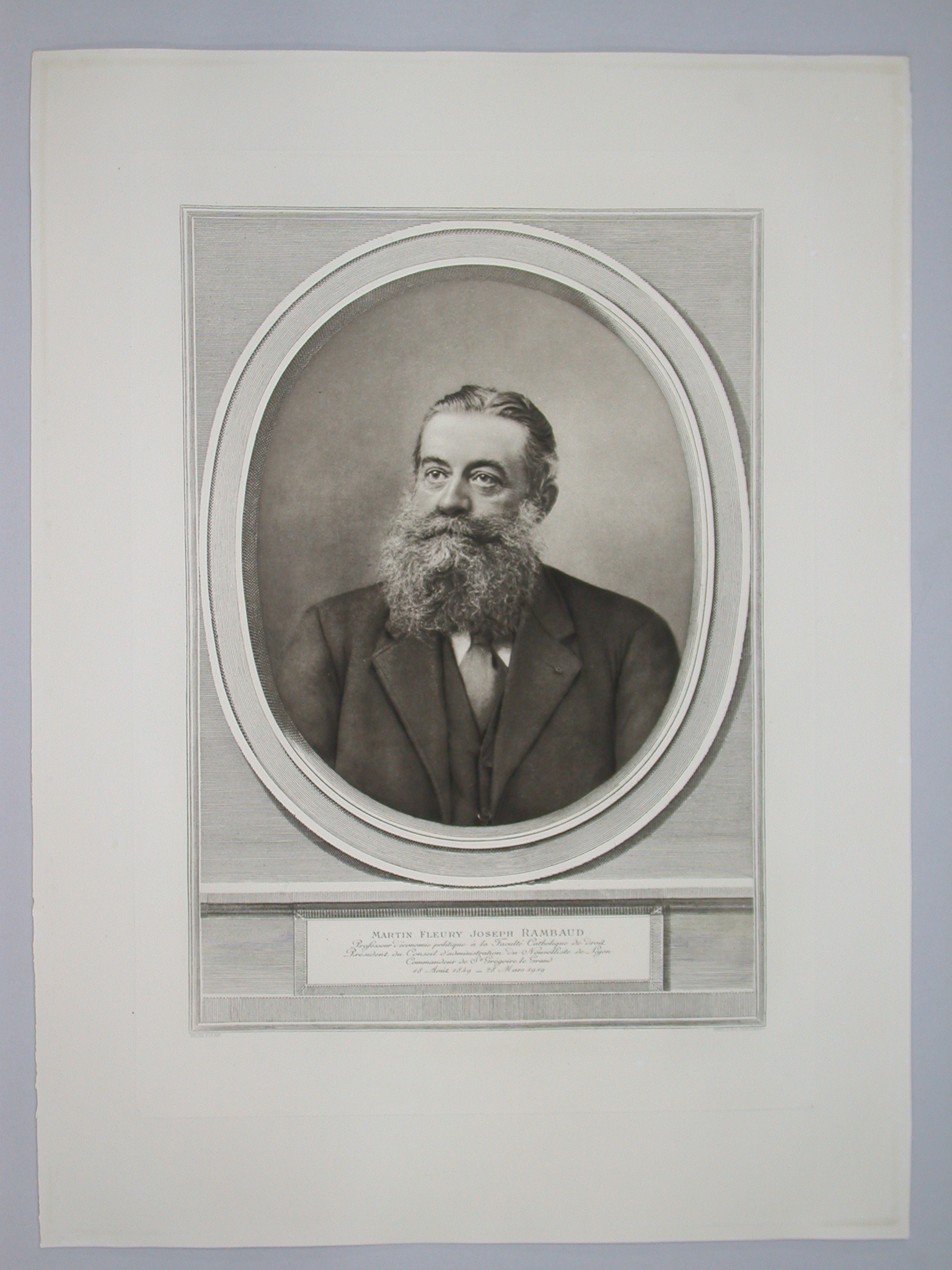
- Joseph Rambaud in 1919
- Born: August 18, 1849; Lyon, France
- Died: March 28, 1919 (aged 69); Lyon, France
- Occupations: Professor, Economist, Businessman
- Notable work: Founder of Le Nouvelliste de Lyon
- Honors: Legion of Honour, Commander of the Order of St. Gregory the Great

Joseph Rambaud (August 18, 1849 – March 28, 1919) was a French professor, economist, and businessman. In 1879, he founded the Catholic daily newspapers Le Nouvelliste de Lyon and Le Nouvelliste de Bretagne.

== Biography ==
Joseph Rambaud was born into an old Lyonnaise family, descended from and allied with families of silk merchants and former aldermen of Lyon. He represented these wealthy, Christian families who actively participated in society, akin to Édouard Aynard, though Rambaud's Catholicism was more conservative.

He studied under Jesuits at Mongré in Villefranche-sur-Saône from 1866 to 1869 and joined the Papal Zouaves in 1870 before pursuing law and literature studies in Paris. A landowner and administrator of the Firminy mines and the forges of Terrenoire, Rambaud practiced law briefly before dedicating himself to education. He helped establish the Catholic University of Lyon in 1875.

Appointed to a chair of Roman law in 1876, he later taught criminal law and financial legislation and began a course on political economy in 1885. Rambaud held the first chair of political economy in Lyon, the second of its kind in France. Influenced by the Church's social values, particularly the encyclical Rerum Novarum (1891), Rambaud developed an independent economic philosophy, avoiding alignment with traditional socialist or liberal schools. On June 6, 1914, he became a corresponding member of the Académie des sciences morales et politiques.

In 1879, using his fortune to support his ideas, Rambaud founded the daily political newspaper Le Nouvelliste de Lyon, which rivaled progressive outlets such as Le Petit Lyonnais and Lyon Républicain. Under his leadership, the paper reached a circulation of over 100,000 and continued to thrive under his son Régis, surpassing 200,000 copies between the wars. The paper advocated Christian values without aligning with any political party. Rambaud was described as "a doctrinaire intransigent who combined an economic liberalism inspired by Frédéric Le Play with a religious vision of world order."

A member of the Congrégation des Messieurs de Lyon, Rambaud was active in Lyon's Catholic circles. During the French Third Republic, he supported free education and contributed to establishing the Externat Saint-Joseph civil society to protect property from Republican legislation.

As mayor of Vaugneray from 1882 to 1892, he unsuccessfully ran for the 1886 cantonal elections against Auguste Ferrouillat, owner of Lyon Républicain.

=== Marriage and Family ===
Rambaud was related to Pierre-Thomas Rambaud, Baron of the Empire, and was the nephew of Frédéric Ozanam. In 1872, he married Claudine Berloty, a descendant of Benoît Coste and relative of Pauline Jaricot. The couple had twelve children, including Régis Rambaud, who succeeded him as director of Le Nouvelliste, and Henri Rambaud, a professor, journalist, and writer. He was also the grandfather of Philippe de la Trinité, a Carmelite, and great-grandfather of Claire de Castelbajac.

== Works ==
- Des donations entre époux, Doctoral thesis, 1875
- Le droit criminel romain dans les actes des martyrs, 1885
- Ce qu'il faut faire face en face des Lois Brisson, 1891
- Éléments d'économie politique, Paris and Lyon, 1894
- Histoire des doctrines économiques, Paris and Lyon, 1899
- Cours d'économie politique, Paris and Lyon, 1910
- Le songe du frère Lai, Lyon

Rambaud contributed numerous articles on law, economics, and society to journals such as L'Université catholique. He regularly wrote for Le Nouvelliste de Lyon, often anonymously, and published literary critiques under the pseudonym M. Tramoy.

== Honors ==
Joseph Rambaud was a recipient of the Legion of Honour and a Commander of the Order of St. Gregory the Great.
