= Emmanuel Desgrées du Loû =

French lawyer and writer (1867–1933)

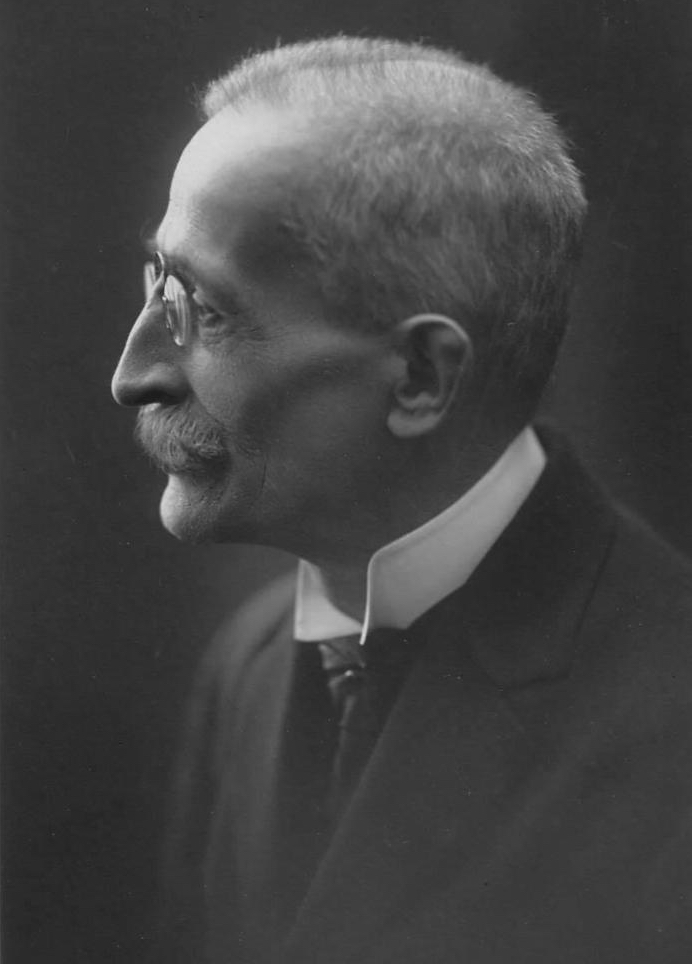
- Portrait of Desgrées du Loû
- Born: Emmanuel-Marie Desgrées du Loû; 22 February 1867; Vannes, France
- Died: 17 February 1933 (aged 65); Rennes, France
- Occupations: Lawyer; journalist; press owner
- Known for: Co-founding L'Ouest-Éclair, promoting Christian democracy
- Notable work: De Léon XIII au Sillon; La politique d'après-guerre
- Children: 2
- Family: Desgrées du Loû family

Emmanuel-Marie Desgrées du Loû (22 February 1867 in Vannes – 17 February 1933 in Rennes) was a French lawyer, journalist, press owner, and a politically active Christian.

A Christian activist, he campaigned for the Ralliement. As a journalist, he managed several publications and co-founded the major regional daily newspaper L'Ouest-Éclair. A pioneer of Christian democracy, he helped establish the Popular Democratic Party.

== Biography ==
The arms of the Desgrées du Loû family.

Born into the Breton Desgrées du Loû family, Emmanuel was the son of Henri Desgrées du Loû, an officer, and Philomène Gobbé de La Gaudinais. His brother was the future colonel Xavier Desgrées du Loû.

He studied law and later joined the French Navy Commissariat, becoming a trainee commissioner in 1889 and an assistant commissioner in 1891.

He resigned to become a lawyer in Brest in 1892, where he quickly gained recognition, particularly for his social and religious work. He contributed to the newspapers L'Univers and La Justice Sociale. He was associated with Albert de Mun, Abbé Gayraud, and, in 1894, founded the Catholic Workers' Committee in Brest.

In 1897, during legislative elections, he was convicted due to bulletins printed in his name. He campaigned for the Ralliement throughout Brittany, collaborating with Abbé Félix Trochu and Abbé Cublet to develop social initiatives like agricultural unions and rural credit unions.

In 1898, Emmanuel Desgrées du Loû edited several publications in Rennes, including L'Écho de l'Ouest, L'Écho de la mer, and Le Dolois. He proposed the idea of a regional daily newspaper. Gathering 86,000 francs, he launched L'Ouest-Éclair with Abbé Trochu. The first issue was published in Rennes on 2 August 1899. In the editorial, he declared his opposition to sectarianism and his commitment to social justice, religious peace, and social unity.

He authored several works, including De Léon XIII au Sillon in 1908 and La politique d'après-guerre in 1919.

Described as "one of the most courageous and effective pioneers of Christian democracy", Emmanuel Desgrées du Loû co-founded the Popular Democratic Party in 1924 and became one of its main supporters.

He led L'Ouest-Éclair to become the leading regional newspaper and served as its political director until his death in 1933.

He was the father of François Desgrées du Loû (1909–1985), a Resistance fighter and co-founder of Ouest-France, and Magdeleine Desgrées du Loû (1896–1991), who married Paul Hutin-Desgrées (1888–1975), also a Resistance fighter, co-founder of Ouest-France, and deputy. His maternal grandson was Stanislas Hutin.

== Honors ==
The "Emmanuel Desgrées du Loû promotion" was the name of the 2007 graduating class of the École des officiers du commissariat de la marine in his honor.
