= Henri Rambaud =

- Born: January 21, 1899; Lyon, France
- Died: February 14, 1974 (aged 75); Lyon, France
- Occupations: Professor, journalist, writer
- Notable work: Specialist in English novels

Henri Rambaud (January 21, 1899 – February 14, 1974) was a French professor of literature, journalist, and writer, known for his expertise in the English novel.

== Biography ==
Henri Rambaud was a professor of literature at the Catholic University of Lyon and the son of Joseph Rambaud, a professor and economist who founded the conservative daily newspaper Le Nouvelliste de Lyon in 1879.

After spending some time in Paris, Rambaud returned to Lyon in 1932 to succeed his brother Régis, who had been managing Le Nouvelliste. Due to his age, Henri was named editor-in-chief but was not given overall control of the publishing group. In 1942, after the German occupation of Lyon, he refused to write under German censorship and proposed the closure of the newspaper. Overruled by the board of directors, he resigned and joined the Resistance, participating in the Témoignage chrétien network. His son Jacques Rambaud also joined the Resistance in 1944 as part of the Secret Army in Fridefont (Cantal).

Although he shared a literary friendship with Charles Maurras, leading him to testify on Maurras's behalf during his 1945 trial before the Haute Cour, Rambaud never joined Action française. He did, however, contribute some literary criticism to their journal.

Rambaud also wrote for La Nouvelle Revue Française (1924–1929), La Revue Universelle (edited by Jacques Bainville and Henri Massis), the Bulletin des Lettres, and the Catholic journal Itinéraires (edited by Jean Madiran). The latter dedicated a special issue to him in 1974, the year of his death. In 1975, the journal L’Astrolabe published a tribute by François Richard.

== Publications ==
- With Pierre Varillon, Enquête sur les jeunes maîtres de la littérature, 1923, Blous & Gay editions
- With François Derais, L'envers du journal de Gide, 1951, Le Nouveau Portique editions
- La voie sacrée, 1946, Lardanchet editions
- Prefaces and presentations: Le rouge et le blanc (Lucien Leuwen) by Stendhal, 1928; Les œuvres de La Rochefoucault, 1929; La musique du piano des origines à Ravel by Louis Aguettant, 1954
- "Un poète lyonnais, Victor de Laprade," monograph on the regional poet Victor de Laprade, published in La Revue Fédéraliste (1921)
