= Stanislas Hutin =

French Jesuit seminarian and anti-war activist (1930–2026)

- Born: 7 September 1930; Rennes, France
- Died: 2 September 2026 (aged 95); Arradon, Brittany, France
- Occupations: Jesuit seminarian, anti-war activist
- Parent: Paul Hutin-Desgrées (father)
- Relatives: Emmanuel Desgrées du Loû (maternal grandfather); François Régis Hutin (brother)

Stanislas Hutin (7 September 1930 – 2 September 2026) was a French Jesuit seminarian and anti-war activist.

== Biography ==
Hutin was born in Rennes on 7 September 1930, the son of Paul Hutin-Desgrées, a journalist and member of the National Assembly of France, and Magdeleine Desgrées du Loû. He was the brother of François Régis Hutin, a journalist, and his maternal grandfather Emmanuel Desgrées du Loû founded L'Ouest-Éclair, a regional daily newspaper in his hometown. In 1951, he entered the Jesuit order. In 1954, he served in the military in Madagascar, and in 1955, he was sent to Algeria. He studied philosophy in a seminary near Le Puy-en-Velay.

In 1956, Hutin anonymously published his testimony on the witnessed torture of Algerians by the French Armed Forces during the Algerian War. His testimony was re-published by numerous anti-war writers, and it was used in Pierre-Henri Simon's 1957 book Contre la Torture. He was cited by historian Pierre Vidal-Naquet in the 1972 book La Torture dans la République. He left the Jesuits after the Algerian War ended, and he worked as a development worker in the late 1970s.

Hutin died in Arradon, Brittany, on 2 September 2026, at the age of 95.
