= Europe of 100 Flags =

Proposed re-conception of Europe as a collection of small nationalist states

Europe of 100 Flags is a concept developed by Breton nationalist Yann Fouéré in his 1968 book, L'Europe aux Cent Drapeaux. It proposes a redrawing of European borders away from already existing nations to smaller regional polities, in a way that more resembles a map of the region during the Middle Ages, including the creation of states for Basques, Bretons, and Flemings.

The continent would "divide to unite" and "decentralize inwardly and federate outwardly". These regions would be designed to promote regionalism and European federalism as a replacement for nationalism, and redefine extreme European boundaries more strictly in terms of ethnically homogeneous "authentic" historic regions. These individually ethnically "pure" states would then be incorporated under a "post-liberal-pan-European framework".

It has been embraced by many in the far-right, such as those among the Identitarian movement and the Nouvelle Droite – the French New Right – and has been described as a "multiculturalism of the right", one based on exclusion, homogeneity, and ethnoregionalism. The Oxford Handbook of the Radical Right describes it as a minor exception to the radical right's preference for ethnic nationalism. Political scientist Alberto Spektorowski described it as a way for the radical-right to publicly recognize outsiders while preventing them from assimilating or gaining political power. It has also been described as a form of "ultra-regionalism" as a re-framing of the ultra-nationalism common to fascism. The Dictionary of Irish Biography noted however that Fouéré was influenced by the mutualist anarchist Pierre-Joseph Proudhon.

== See also ==
- Ethnopluralism
- Neo-nationalism
- Right-wing populism
- Ultranationalism
