= Eugène Delahaye =

- Born: 30 June 1881; Lille, France
- Died: 21 April 1954 (aged 72); Rennes, France
- Occupations: Journalist, Essayist
- Notable work: "Quarante ans de journalisme 1906-1946"
- Awards: Knight of the Légion d'honneur (1920), Croix de guerre 1914-1918

Eugène Delahaye (30 June 1881 – 21 April 1954) was a French journalist and essayist, best known for his role as the director of the Breton newspaper Le Nouvelliste de Bretagne and his anti-Masonic publications. He was also active in Breton and French conservative Catholic circles during the early to mid-20th century.

== Early life and education ==
Delahaye was born in Lille, the son of a pharmacist. He was educated at a Jesuit college in Lille before studying law at the Catholic University of Lille for five years. During his student years, he participated in Catholic youth movements, including serving as the secretary of the magazine A la voile. Revue de la jeunesse catholique de la région du Nord and the Catholic student group Conférence Jeanne d'Arc.

== Career ==
=== Early career ===
In December 1905, Delahaye moved to Rennes to work as a journalist for Le Nouvelliste de Bretagne. He quickly rose through the ranks, becoming chief editor and later director in 1913. Under his leadership, the newspaper became a significant voice for conservative Catholicism in Brittany.

=== Role during World War I ===
Delahaye served as a sub-lieutenant in the 41st Infantry Regiment during World War I, participating in major battles such as Verdun. He founded and edited Grenadia, a regimental newspaper, to boost morale among the troops. For his wartime service, he was awarded the Croix de guerre 1914–1918 and was made a Knight of the Légion d'honneur in 1920.

=== Post-war activities ===
After the war, Delahaye returned to his role at Le Nouvelliste, where he campaigned for Catholic unity and conservative values. He criticized the Parti Démocrate Populaire and advocated for alliances between Catholic monarchists and republicans. He also opposed freemasonry, publishing several widely distributed anti-Masonic pamphlets. In response to the anti-clerical policies of the Cartel des Gauches in 1924–1925, Delahaye became a prominent advocate for Catholic reaction, leading to the formation of associations affiliated with the Fédération nationale catholique and becoming closer to the leading right wing organisation Action Française. This often led to clashes with the rival Catholic Breton publication L'Ouest-Éclair.

=== Departure from Le Nouvelliste ===
After the Papal condemnation of Action Française in 1926 Delahaye tried to keep the paper close to Action Française and the Archbishop of Rennes, Alexis-Armand Charost, although previously a supporter of Action Française encouraged the newspaper to distance itself from partisan politics and align with Vatican directives. In 1928, Delahaye resigned as director of Le Nouvelliste. He subsequently founded La Province, a weekly newspaper that continued his advocacy for conservative Catholic causes.

=== Later years ===
During World War II, Delahaye was briefly detained by German authorities but refrained from active collaboration. After the war, he resumed publishing La Province, but it was eventually shut down due to allegations of wartime collaboration. Delahaye spent his later years writing his memoirs and advocating for conservative causes.

== Publications ==
- Franc-maçonnerie (1928)
- Un Reportage dans les Loges Maçonniques (1929)
- Quarante ans de journalisme 1906–1946 (1946)

== Legacy ==
Delahaye remains a controversial figure for his outspoken views on freemasonry, politics, and his role in conservative Catholic circles. His memoirs provide insight into early 20th-century Catholic journalism and political activism in France.
