= Yann Fouéré =

French political philosopher (1910–2011)

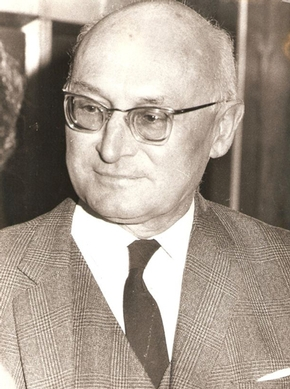
- Yann Fouéré, Breton nationalist and writer
- Born: Jean Adolphe Fouéré; 26 July 1910; Aignan, Gers, France
- Died: 20 October 2011 (aged 101); Saint-Brieuc, France
- Other name: Seàn Mauger
- Occupations: Writer, journalist, political activist
- Spouse: Marie-Magdeleine Mauger
- Children: Olwen Fouéré

Philosophical work
- Institutions: Celtic League; European Free Alliance; Movement for the Organisation of Brittany
- Main interests: Breton nationalism, European integration, Federalism
- Notable works: Towards a federal Europe (1968)
- Notable ideas: Europe of 100 Flags

Yann Fouéré (26 July 1910 – 20 October 2011) was a French essayist, theorist of Breton nationalism, and political activist. Over his lifetime, he was a propagandist, high-ranking civil servant, newspaper editor, essayist, and founder of political parties.

In 1946, he was convicted in absentia for collaboration in France due to his involvement in Brest's press under German occupation. However, he was acquitted and rehabilitated by a military tribunal in 1955. He is the author of L'Europe aux cent drapeaux (1968), which was translated into multiple languages.

== Biography ==
=== Early life and education ===
Jean Adolphe Fouéré was born in Aignan, Gers on 26 July 1910. His father, Jean Fouéré, was a tax official originally from the Côtes-du-Nord, and his mother, Marie Liégard, came from a family of pharmacists and local politicians in Callac. His French birth certificate names him as Jean Adolphe Fouéré, a French name, as the French Third Republic did not allow Breton names. In 1912, his parents moved to Rennes, where his younger sister, Eliette, was born in 1913. After the outbreak of World War I, his father was mobilized on 1 March 1915, and the family relocated to Callac.

His family spoke French at home but he later recalled in his memoirs his surprise at seeing the Breton language prohibited in his school. His father, after being wounded on the battlefield, returned as a decorated war hero in 1919, moving to Paris where he became the personal secretary of Yves Le Trocquer, the newly appointed Minister of Public Works.

Fouéré was educated in Saint-Brieuc at the Saint-Charles school. He later attended the Lycée Montaigne (Paris) and the prestigious Lycée Louis-le-Grand, where he admitted to being an average student. He completed his higher education in law and political science at the École libre des sciences politiques, earning a doctorate in law in 1939.

=== Political activism and collaboration controversy ===
Fouéré became involved in Breton cultural and political movements, co-founding Ar Brezhoneg er Skol ("Breton in Schools") with Yann Sohier and Roparz Hemon. He also served as vice-president of the Union régionaliste bretonne and was an active participant in the Breton nationalist movement.

During World War II, Fouéré founded and edited the pro-autonomist newspaper La Bretagne, which was published in Brest from 1941 to 1945. In 1942 he also took over La Dépêche de Brest after the previous ownership were seen as insufficiently pro-Vichy. The newspaper, under German censorship, promoted the idea of Breton autonomy within a European framework. Some of its articles contained antisemitic content, leading to post-war scrutiny of Fouéré's role in the wartime press. He fled the country after the Liberation of France in 1945.

In 1946, he was sentenced to life imprisonment in absentia for collaborationist activities but fled to Wales and later settled in Ireland, taking Irish citizenship in the early 1950s. In 1955, he voluntarily returned to France to face trial and was acquitted. He then resumed his political activism.

=== Later years and separatist advocacy ===
Fouéré remained a key figure in Breton nationalism, promoting federalism and advocating for greater autonomy. In 1968, he published Europe of 100 Flags (L'Europe aux cent drapeaux), which called for a Europe of autonomous regions rather than centralized states. As well as far right he was also influenced by the mutualist anarchist Proudhon.

He co-founded the Celtic League with fellow Breton Alan Heusaff in 1961 and was involved in multiple Breton nationalist organizations, including the Movement for the Organisation of a Free Brittany (Mouvement pour l'organisation de la Bretagne, MOB) and L'Avenir de la Bretagne. He also co-founded the European Free Alliance. In the 1970s, he was briefly imprisoned under suspicion of supporting Breton nationalist militants but was later released.

=== Family and death ===
Fouéré's daughter with his wife, Marie-Magdeleine Mauger, is Irish actress Olwen Fouéré. He was a member of the Knights of the Sovereign Order of Jerusalem. Fouéré continued writing and political organizing until his death in Saint-Brieuc in 2011 at the age of 101.

== Works ==
=== English ===
- Towards a federal Europe, 1968; ISBN 0-7154-0485-7

=== French ===
- La Bretagne Ecartelée: Essai pour servir à l'histoire de dix ans. 1938-1948. Paris: Nouvelles éditions latines, 1962
- L'Europe aux Cent Drapeaux: Essai Pour Servir à La Construction de l'Europe. Paris: Presses d'Europe, 1968
- En prison pour le FLB Front de Libération de la Bretagne Paris: Nouvelles Editions Latines 1977
- Histoire résumée du mouvement Breton, du XIXe siècle à nos jours (1800–1976). Quimper: Editions Nature et Bretagne, 1977 ISBN 2-85257-027-0
- Ces Droits que les autres ont mais que nous n'avons pas. Quimper: Editions Nature et Bretagne, 1979 ISBN 9782852570290
- with Youenn Didro – L'Histoire du quotidien La Bretagne et les silences d'Henri Fréville. Saint-Brieuc: Les Cahiers De L'Avenir de la Bretagne, 1981
- Problèmes Bretons du Temps Présent. Saint-Brieuc: Les Cahiers de l'Avenir, 1983
- La Patrie interdite: Histoire d'un Breton. Editions France Empire, 1987 ISBN 9782704805662
- Histoire du quotidien La Bretagne (1981)
- La maison du connemara: Histoire d'un Breton 2. Editions Coop Breizh, 1995 ISBN 9782704805662
- Europe ! Nationalité bretonne… Citoyen français?. Coop Breizh, 2000; Celtics Chadenn, 2003 {{isbn}9782847220186}}
- with Thierry Jigourel, Jean Cevaër, et al. – Projet de loi portant statut d'autonomie pour la Bretagne. Saint-Brieuc: Parti pour l'organisation d'une Bretagne libre, 2001
