= Le Nouvelliste de Lyon =

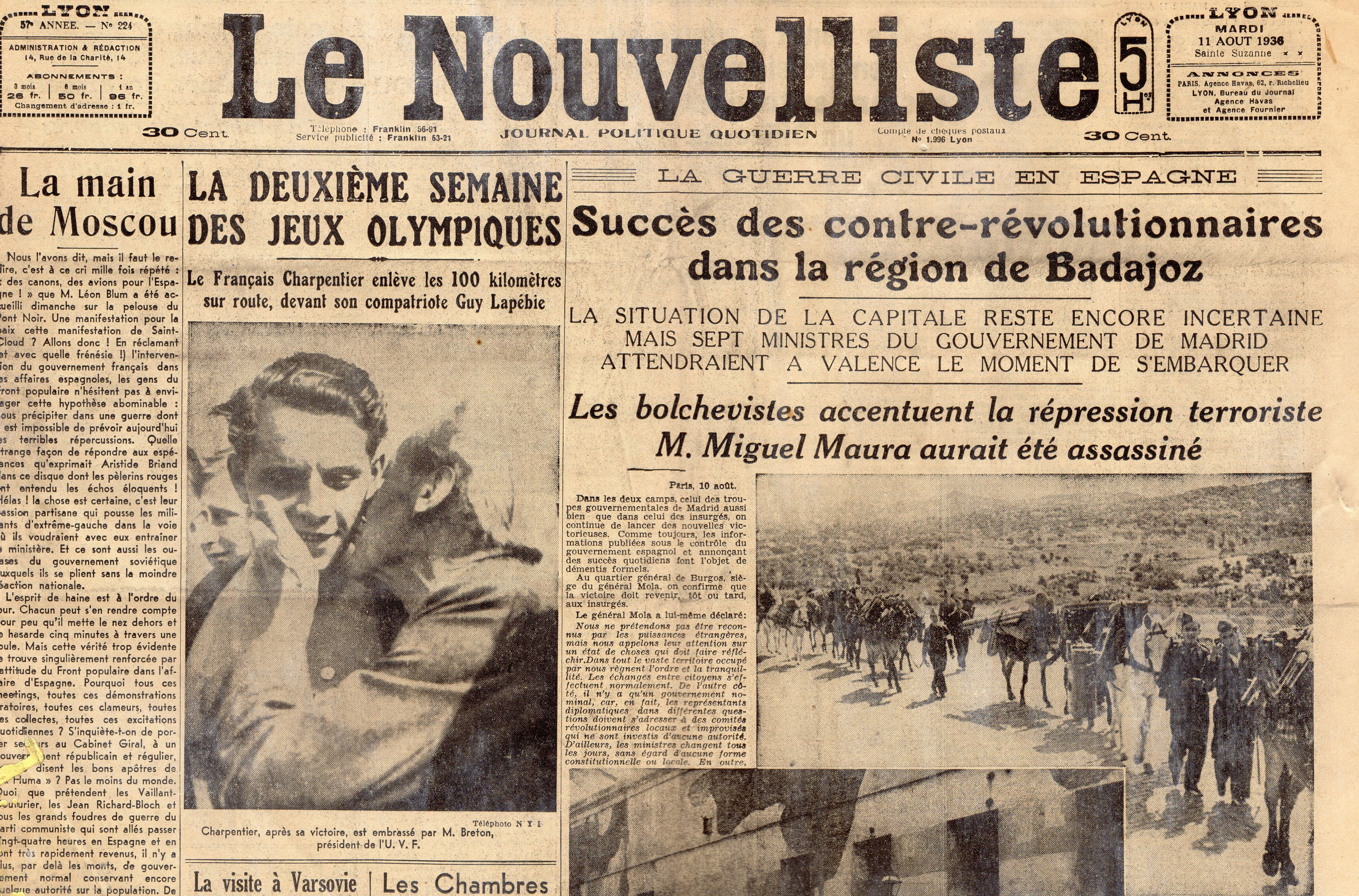
- Front page of Le Nouvelliste on 11 August 1936: editorial attacking Léon Blum, 1936 Summer Olympics, and the Spanish Civil War.
- Type: Daily newspaper
- Editor-in-chief: Ernest Le Clerc
- Editor: Joseph Rambaud, Régis Rambaud
- Founded: 15 May 1879
- Ceased publication: 27 August 1944
- Language: French
- Headquarters: Lyon, France
- Country: France

Le Nouvelliste de Lyon was a daily newspaper published in Lyon, France, from 15 May 1879 to 27 August 1944.

== History ==
Designed as a Catholic and popular newspaper at a time when rightwing press outlets were supported by the diocese of Lyon, Le Nouvelliste de Lyon was a large-format daily newspaper priced at one sou (five centimes). It was a major competitor to the newspaper Le Progrès and circulated in approximately 15 départements.

The newspaper's offices were located at 14 Rue de la Charité in Lyon and 26 Rue Feydeau in Paris. In 1898, the headquarters was placed under the protection of Joan of Arc, with a statue sculpted by Paul-Émile Millefaut adorning the façade.

For 40 years, the paper was directed by economist and law professor Joseph Rambaud, a Lyon native, father of 12 children, and former Papal Zouave. A member of the elite Catholic and Legitimist Congrégation des Messieurs de Lyon, many of his fellow members were also shareholders. He also founded and directed Le Nouvelliste de Bretagne, which was sold in 1905 to La Presse régionale. Collaborating with other Catholic publications, Rambaud and his colleagues established a common service for these newspapers in their Paris editorial offices. This service included other titles such as L'Éclair from Montpellier, Le Nouvelliste de Bordeaux, L'Express du Midi, and Le Journal de Roubaix.

Despite attempts to establish branches like Le Nouvelliste de Nantes and Le Nouvelliste de Bordeaux, these efforts were less successful. During World War I, its editor-in-chief was Ernest Le Clerc. Directed by Régis Rambaud, son of the founder, from 1919 to 1932, it reached a circulation of nearly 200,000 copies daily. Another son, Henri Rambaud, also became a journalist and author.

During World War II, the paper hosted displaced Parisian publications like Le Figaro. After a failed attempt to dissolve the paper, Henri Rambaud resigned in 1942 and joined the French Resistance, participating in Lyon's clandestine press.

On 31 December 1943, the Mouvements Unis de la Résistance distributed a fake edition of Le Nouvelliste.

After the war, Le Nouvelliste was banned for collaboration but later pardoned by President René Coty.

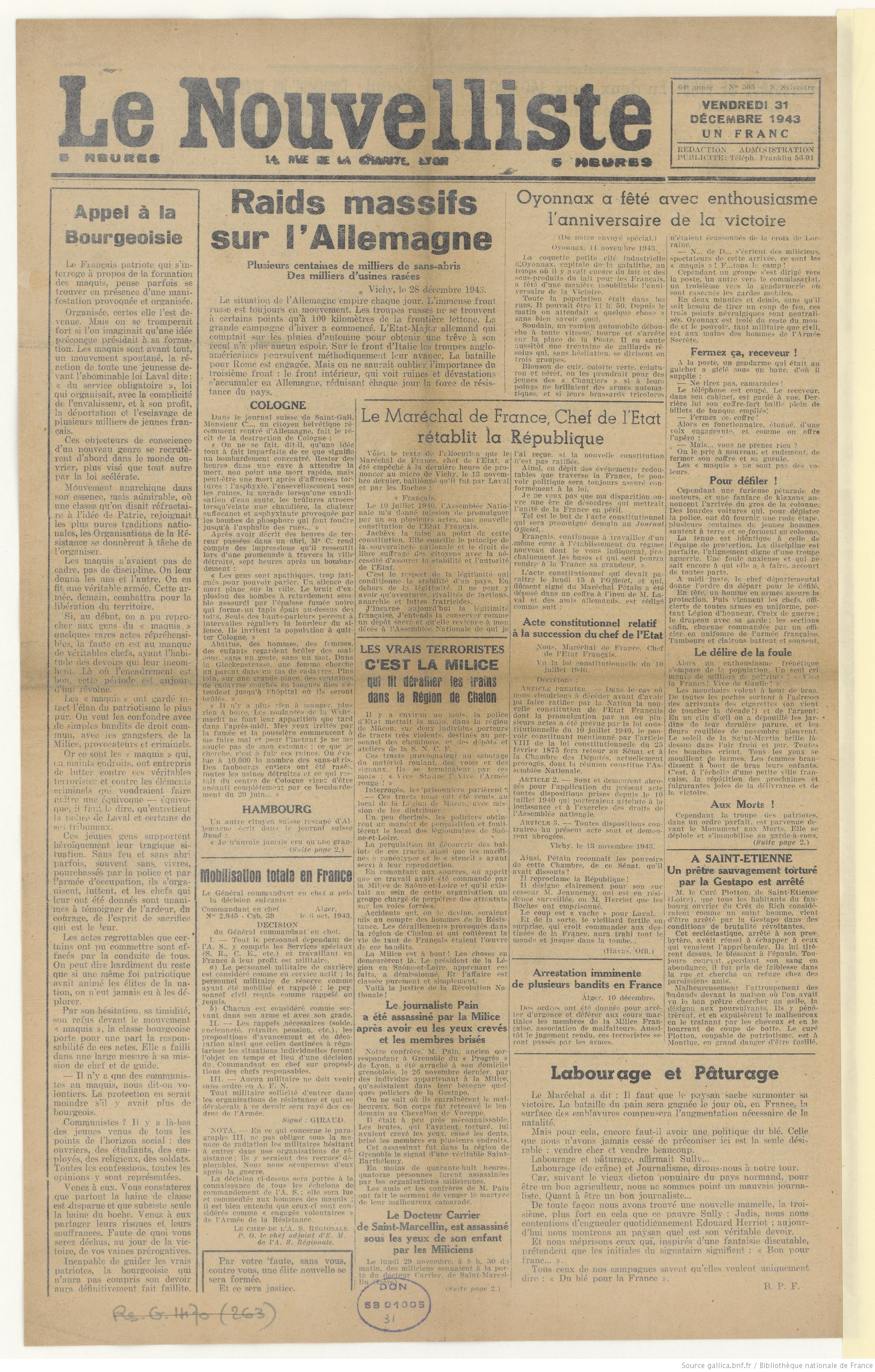
Fake Le Nouvelliste, page 1

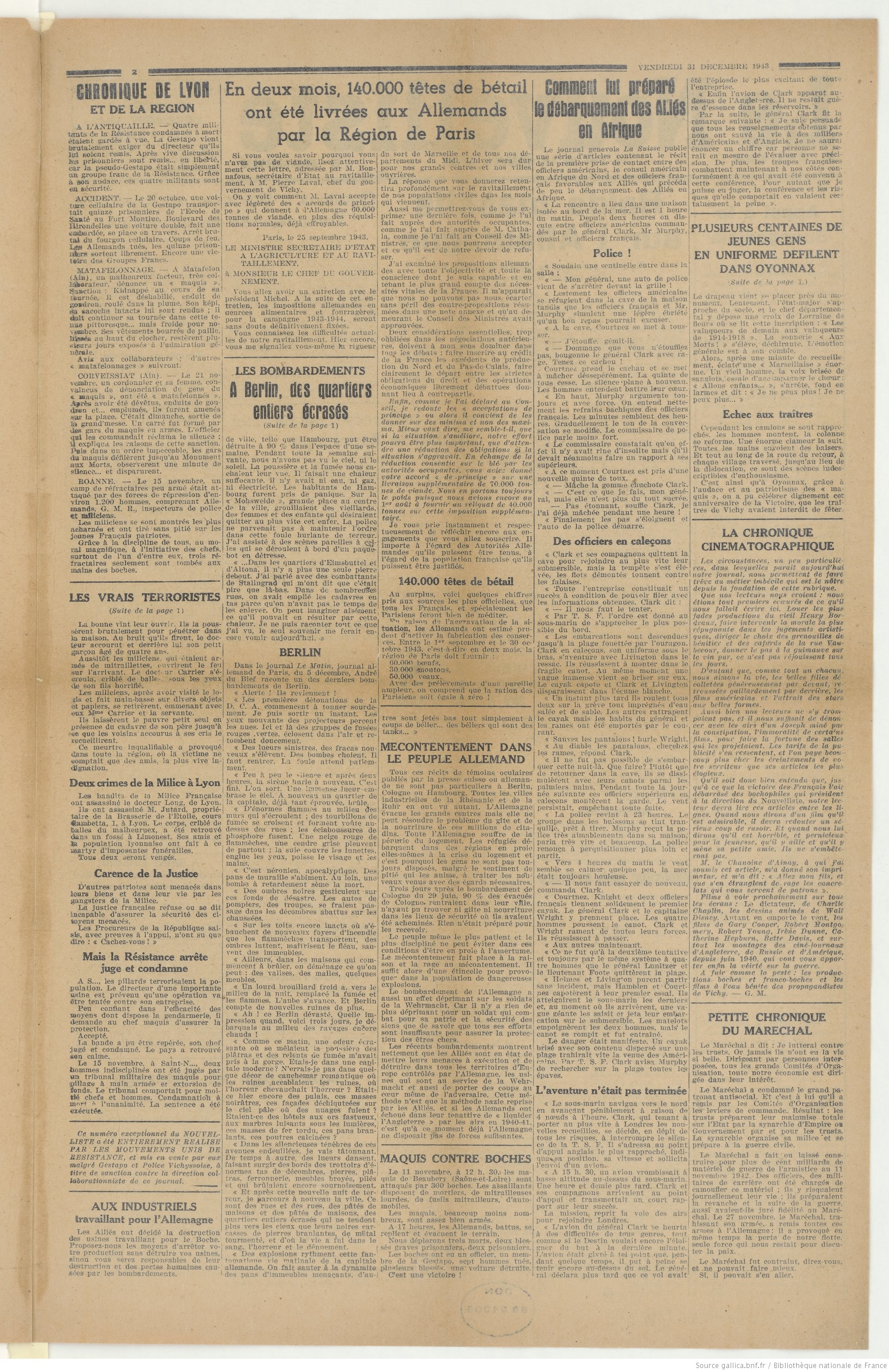
Fake Le Nouvelliste, page 2
