= François Varillon =

French Jesuit priest and theologian

Personal life
- Born: July 28, 1905 Bron, near Lyon, France
- Died: July 17, 1978 (aged 72) Bron, France
- Notable work(s): L'humilité de Dieu, Joie de croire, Joie de vivre
- Occupation: Jesuit priest, theologian

Religious life
- Order: Society of Jesus
- Church: Catholic Church

François Varillon (July 28, 1905 – July 17, 1978) was a French Jesuit priest and theologian whose writings on Christian theology and formation left a significant mark on 20th-century spirituality.

== Biography ==
=== Early Life and Joining the Jesuits ===
Born in Bron, François Varillon grew up in a middle-class Catholic family in Lyon, a city to which he remained deeply attached throughout his life.

In September 1925, he had a mystical experience with Simone Chevallier, a young woman he loved. Both decided to enter religious life as a mutual commitment to sublimate their affection. His friend Lucien Rebatet, also a student in Lyon, drew on this episode for his novel Les Deux Étendards (1951), portraying François as Régis Lanthelme. Similarly, Simone depicted François as Vincent Ramenel in her novel La Ville aux deux fleuves (1945).

At 22, François Varillon joined the Jesuit novitiate in Yzeure after completing a degree in literature. He was ordained a Catholic priest on June 24, 1937, and took his final vows in the Society of Jesus on February 2, 1945.

=== Renewing the Understanding of Faith ===
The core of Varillon’s ministry was educating people in faith. As a teacher and chaplain in the 1930s, he founded communities that encouraged living an authentic Christian lifestyle. For 20 years, he organized monthly lecture series exploring literature, theater, music, and film.

After World War II, he served as chaplain to the Association catholique de la jeunesse française and spent over a decade training young Catholics. He preached numerous spiritual retreats throughout his life. He also was a spiritual director for the elite Lyonaise Catholic group the Congrégation des Messieurs de Lyon.

Varillon advocated for using reason in faith, opposing fideism, and encouraged believers to exercise their freedom in discerning God’s will through Spiritual Exercises inspired by Ignatius of Loyola.

In his last decade, Varillon traveled across France giving conferences in cities such as Paris, Lyon, and Marseille. The lectures were later compiled by Bernard Housset and published posthumously as Joie de croire, Joie de vivre, with a foreword by his friend René Rémond. This book sold over 100,000 copies.

=== The Humility of God ===
In his book L’Humilité de Dieu, Varillon presented a new theological perspective, portraying God not as an omnipotent and impassive being, but as humble and loving: "If God is love, He is humble." For Varillon, God’s power is limited to what love can achieve, as "those who love most are the most dependent." This work earned him the Grand Prix catholique de littérature in 1974.

=== The Integration of Culture and Faith ===
A lover of literature and music, Varillon often explored the interplay between culture and spirituality. His first article for the Jesuit journal Études was titled "Human Culture and Christian Renunciation" (1935). His intellectual influences included Fénelon, Paul Claudel, and Richard Wagner, whose works represented, respectively, wisdom, passion, and joy.

He believed faith and reason were deeply united, enabling a coherent vision of reality. This coherence was reflected in his teachings and writings.

== Works ==
- Fénelon et le pur amour (1957)
- Un abrégé de la foi catholique (1968)
- L'humilité de Dieu (1974)
- La souffrance de Dieu (1975)
- Claudel (1967)
- Débat sur la foi with Marcel Légaut (1972)
- Beauté du monde, souffrance des hommes (1978)
- Joie de croire, Joie de vivre (1981)

== Legacy ==
In Lyon, a square is named in his honor: Place Père François-Varillon.
