= Le Télégramme =

French daily newspaper

- Type: Daily newspaper
- Format: Tabloid
- Owner: Groupe Télégramme
- Founded: 1944
- Language: French, with a page in Breton language on Thursdays
- Headquarters: Morlaix
- Circulation: 181,925 (2020)
- ISSN: 0751-5928
- Website: www.letelegramme.fr

Le Télégramme (French pronunciation: [lə teleɡʁam]) is a French-language daily newspaper from the Brittany region of France, based in the commune of Morlaix. It was founded in 1944 and still exists to this day, although circulation has been declining since 2012.

== History and profile ==
Le Télégramme was founded on 12 September 1944 by members of the French Resistance as the Germans retreated following D-Day and the 6 June 1944 Normandy landings. It was seen as a replacement for La Dépêche de Brest which had been seen as collaborationist.

The newspaper is distributed in the Finistère department, the Côtes-d'Armor department and elsewhere in Brittany.

Circulation of the newspaper
Title	2012	2013	2014	2015	2016	2017	2018	2019	2020	2021
Circulation	209,615	207,026	205,654	202,626	199,510	196,998	192,813	184,580	177,880	174,753
