= Louis Aguettant =

French poet and musicologist (1871–1931)

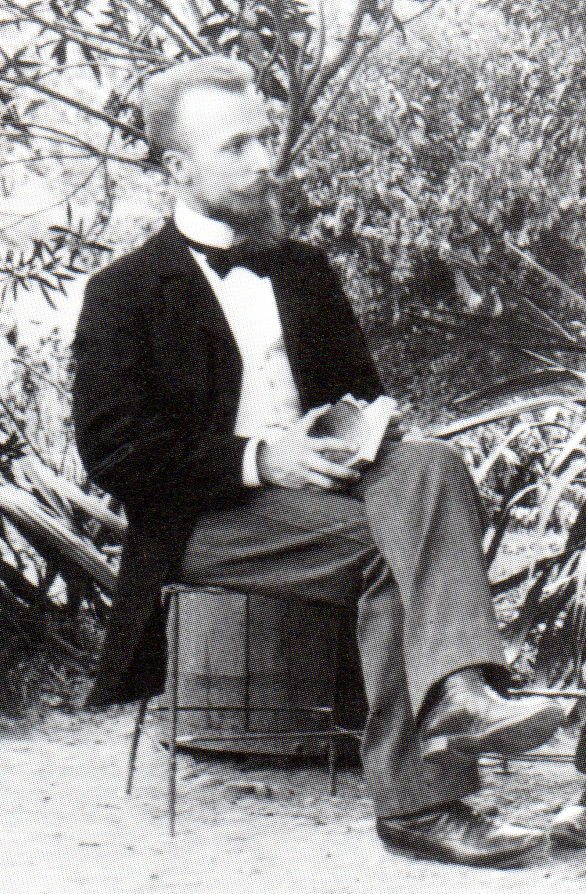
- Born: 3 April 1871; Lyon, France
- Died: 10 March 1931 (aged 59); Lyon, France
- Education: Sorbonne
- Occupations: Musicologist; Music educator

Louis Aguettant (3 April 1871 – 10 March 1931) was a French musicologist, writer and teacher of French literature.

== Biography ==
Bachelor of letters in 1887 and of sciences in 1888, Bachelor of Arts in 1891, agrégé of the Sorbonne in 1895, musicologist, Louis Aguettant was professor of French literature at the Catholic Faculty of Lyon, a chair he kept until his death.

== Music, poetry and literature ==
He was a professor-lecturer of European culture, an outstanding artist and pianist as witnessed by Ignacy Paderewski who took an interest in him and considered that he had the stuff of "a talent of the first order."

Passionate about music he met Gabriel Fauré, Georges Martin Witkowski, maintained correspondence with Maurice Ravel and Claude Debussy, gave musicology and poetry lessons at the Conservatoire de Lyon, met Paul Claudel, Francis Jammes and Paul Valéry, and taught courses on Paul Verlaine and Charles Baudelaire for 33 years.

In 1921, he married Marcelle Mouly who gave him three children: Jeanne, Louis and Robert.

Attentive to the literature of his time, he corresponded with many influential authors of his time: Jean Cocteau, Paul Claudel, Gabriel Fauré, André Gide, Louis Mercier, Max Jacob, Henry de Montherlant, Charles Péguy, Raymond Radiguet, Albert Thibaudet, Paul Valéry and many others.

Among his works many were published: Les Dialogues de Paul Valéry, La Poésie de Paul Claudel, Un fils de Virgile : Louis Mercier, Jean-Marc Bernard, Marcel Ormoy, Émile Mâle, Le Génie de Gabriel Fauré, André Caplet, translation by Abt Vogler de Browning, etc.

The publication of his book La musique de piano, with a preface by Henri Rambaud was a powerful discovery, "a master book" for Bernard Gavoty, "A breviary" for Alfred Cortot and also "A wonder" for Émile Vuillermoz.

Mgr Lavallée remarked of him: "Artist to the depths of his being, in love with great painters, pianist of remarkable technique and personality in interpretation, he had an extraordinary faculty of emotion".

In November 2003, the Lyon municipal library received the correspondence, notebooks and manuscripts fund, which can be consulted by researchers. In particular, there are five volumes of Notes biographiques (1.418 pages).

== Quote ==
« Un esprit de la plus grande rareté, car très rare sont ceux qui se développent comme lui sur les confins de la musique, des lettres et de l’abstrait » (Paul Valéry).

("A spirit of the greatest rarity, for very rare are those who develop like him on the confines of music, letters and the abstract")

== Works ==
- 1901: Victor Hugo paysagiste
- 1920: Ernest Psichari
- 1923: Les Dialogues de Paul Valéry
- 1925: Le Génie de Gabriel Fauré,
- 1934: Lettres de jeunesse
- 1954: La Musique de piano : des origines à Ravel
- 1957: Lecture de Baudelaire
