= L'Éclair de l'Est =

Catholic daily newspaper published from 1905 to 1940

L’Éclair de l’Est was a Catholic daily newspaper published in Nancy, France, from 1905 to 1940. Founded with the support of the local bishop and leaders of the pro-Republican Catholic Action Libérale Populaire (ALP), it served as a regional voice for Catholic and conservative values, opposing secularism and leftist ideologies. Despite periods of growth and modernization, it struggled financially and ceased publication during World War II.

== Founding ==
Founded in 1905, following Libéral de l'Est (1902-1905), the daily newspaper was established at the request of the Bishop of Nancy, Charles-François Turinaz and local leaders of the ALP (Action Libérale Populaire). Its headquarters were initially at 3 rue des Manèges before moving to Place Carnot in Nancy.

The publishing company, Presse de l'Est, was initially controlled 49.5% by Presse régionale, with a representative among the original five administrators. Louis Hermelin, a journalist for La Croix and future general secretary of the PR, was part of this group. The remaining capital was held by notable individuals from Lorraine, such as Henry Déglin, François de Wendel, and the Count Fery de Ludre, among others.

== Early Administration ==
Henry Déglin, described as the founder of the newspaper, presided over the board of directors until his death in 1906. Subsequent presidents included Louis Bohin and Dr. Xavier Mathieu, serving until 1927. Original administrators included notable figures like Paul Sordoillet, a committed Catholic who became editor-in-chief in 1907 and remained until his death in 1934.

== Political Alignment and Expansion ==
L'Éclair de l'Est had a strong Catholic identity until 1914, openly supporting the Church's rights and opposing Freemasonry, secularism, and leftist ideologies. It maintained close ties with parish press committees, with clergy encouraging parishioners to read the paper.

During World War I and beyond, the newspaper grew into a regional publication, absorbing smaller competitors like the Vosges daily Le Télégramme des Vosges in 1924.

== Financial Struggles and Modernization Attempts ==
Chronic financial difficulties marked the newspaper's history. In 1925, leaders of the Fédération républicaine, including Louis Marin, took control, initiating modernization efforts. Administrators like Édouard de Warren and Emile Meyer attempted to revitalize the publication, but internal conflicts persisted.

By 1939, L'Éclair de l'Est had a circulation of about 30,000 copies, supplemented by the 20,000 copies of Télégramme des Vosges. Despite its growth, it remained significantly outpaced by competitors like L'Est républicain with its 140,000 copies.

The newspaper ceased publication in June 1940 when the German army occupied Nancy during World War II. Efforts to merge it with other regional dailies, such as L'Express de l'Est, were explored but never realized.
