= Henri Fursy =

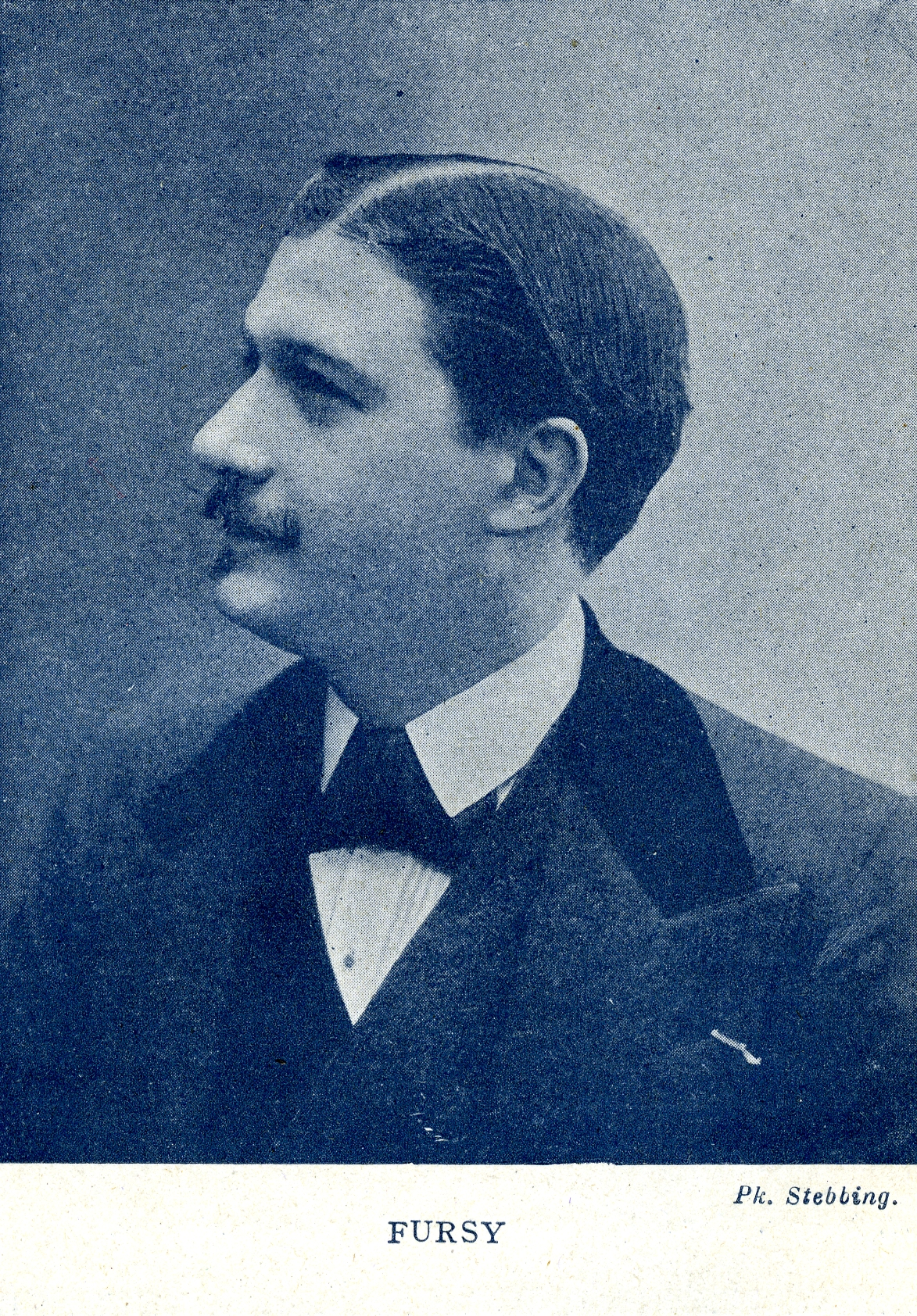
- Fursy around 1908 by Édouard Stebbing
- Born: 26 February 1866; Paris, France
- Died: 14 April 1929 (aged 63); Nice, France
- Occupation: Cabaret Singer

Henri Fursy or Furcy (real name Henri Dreyfus, 26 February 1866 - 14 April 1929) was a French cabaret singer, director and lyricist.

== Life ==
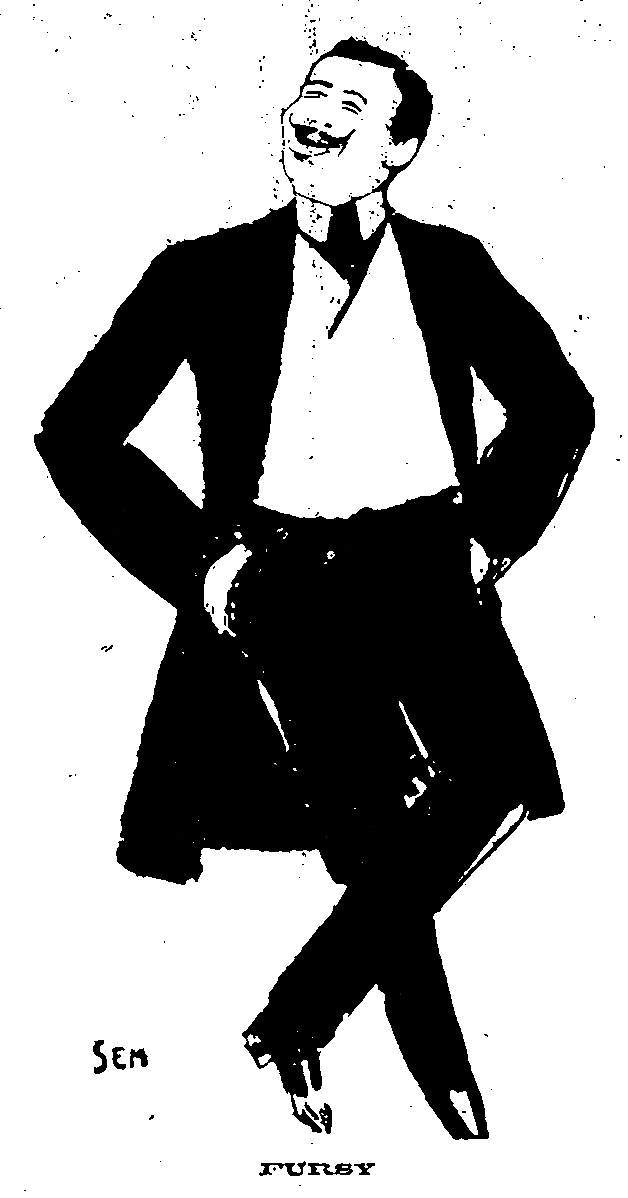
Caricature of Fursy by Sem

Henri Dreyfus was born on 26 February 1866 in the 3rd arrondissement of Paris.

Under the stage name of Henri Fursy, he was a chansonnier, a singer of humorous songs, in Montmartre. He also directed several cabarets as a manager or owner, including the famous Le Chat Noir (The Black Cat), which he bought after the death of Rodolphe Salis and renamed La Boîte à Fursy (The Fursy Box). He also wrote songs for several Parisian artists of the early 20th century.

Henri Fursy was made a Knight of the Legion of Honour in 1927. He died in Nice on 14 April 1929. Albert Michaud published a tribute after his death in Le Cornet (The Horn) where he says Fursy left a young widow and an adopted girl. He is buried in the cemetery of Montparnasse.

== Bibliography ==
- Chansons rosses, Ollendorff, 1898, cover illustration by Léandre.
- Chansons rosses, part 2, Ollendorff, 1899, cover illustration by Gründ.
- Chansons de La Boîte (chansons rosses, part 3), Société d'éditions littéraires et artistiques, 1902.
- Chansons rosses, part 4, Ollendorff, 1905.
