= La Petite Gironde =

French daily newspaper

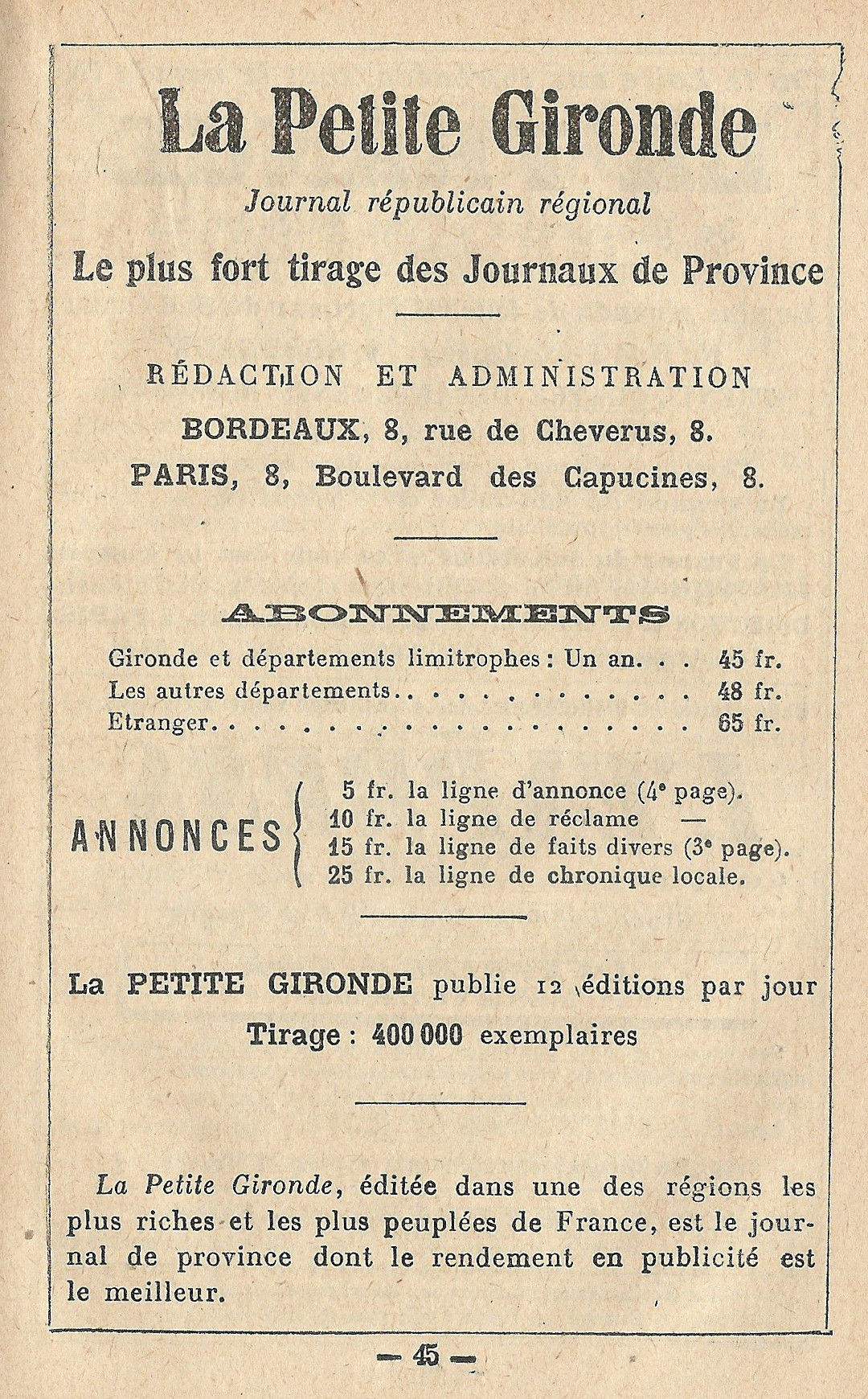
Advertising for La Petite Gironde from 1921.

La Petite Gironde (French pronunciation: [la pətit ʒiʁɔ̃d], literally Little Gironde) was a French daily newspaper from the south and southwest regions of France. It was founded in 1872 and lasted until 1944. With a “moderate republican” tendency, it wanted to be a large regional republican newspaper and a widely consumed cultural product. Originally a moderate centrist, its editorial line straightened out over the years, until it became close to that of L'Action française in the turmoil of the First World War. The newspaper was a collaborationist during the Occupation, which led to its ban after the Liberation of France.
