= Breuvannes-en-Bassigny =

- Commune
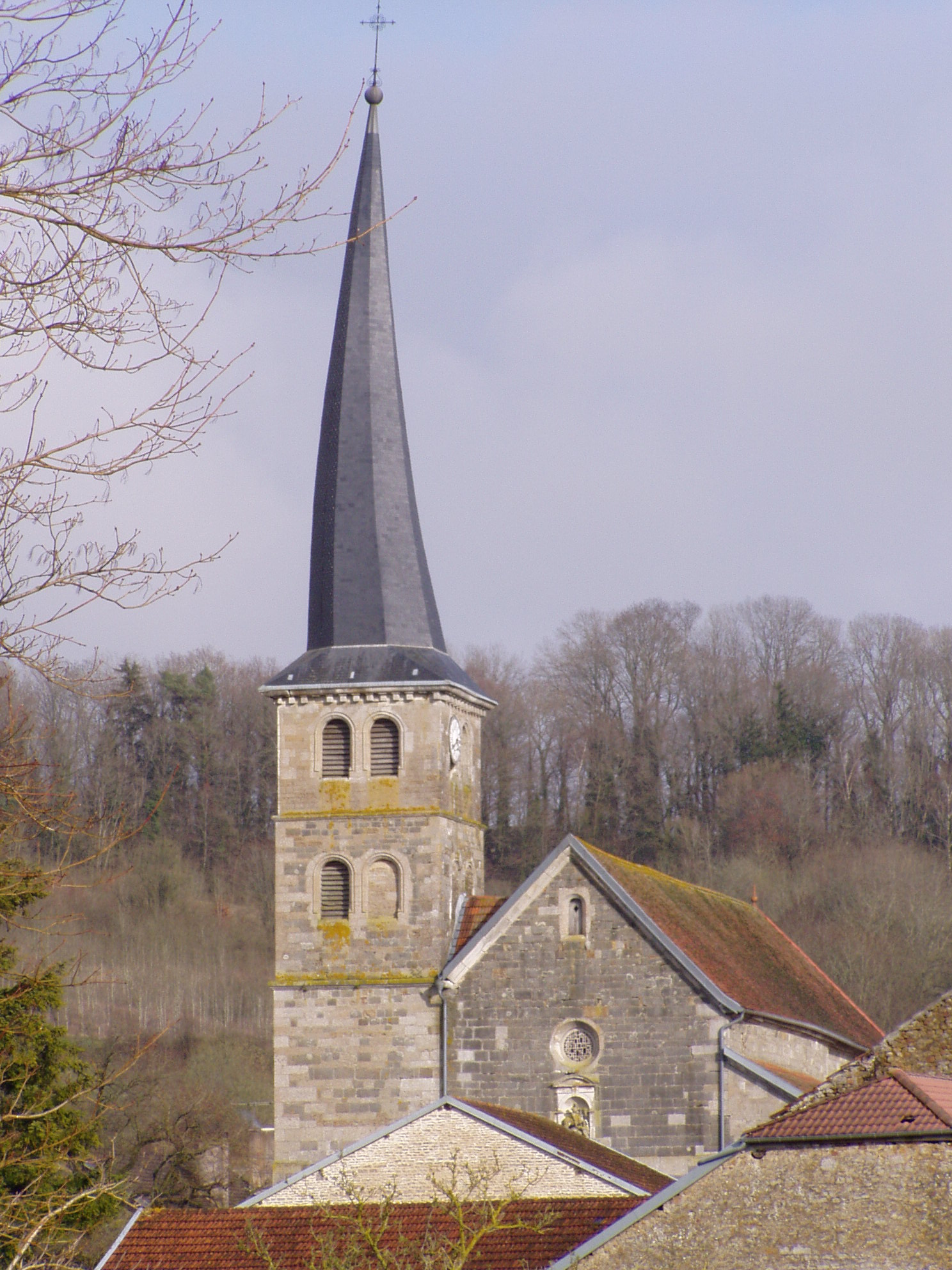
- The church in Meuvy, part of Breuvannes-en-Bassigny

- Coat of arms
- Location of Breuvannes-en-Bassigny
- Location within France Location within Grand Est
- Coordinates: 48°05′40″N 5°36′34″E
- Country: France
- Region: Grand Est
- Department: Haute-Marne
- Arrondissement: Chaumont
- Canton: Poissons

Government
  - Mayor (2020–2026): Sylvie Parot
- Area^{1}: 48.55 km^{2} (18.75 sq mi)
- Elevation: 326 m (1,070 ft)
- Population (2023): 632
  - Density: 13.0/km^{2} (33.7/sq mi)
- Time zone: UTC+01:00 (CET)
  - Summer (DST): UTC+02:00 (CEST)
- INSEE/Postal code: 52074 /52240
- ^{1} French Land Register data, which excludes lakes, ponds, glaciers > 1 km^{2} (0.386 sq mi or 247 acres) and river estuaries.

Breuvannes-en-Bassigny (French pronunciation: [bʁøvan ɑ̃ basiɲi]) is a commune in the Haute-Marne department in northeastern France.

== Population ==
Historical population
Year	Pop.	±% p.a.
1968	879	—
1975	896	+0.27%
1982	805	−1.52%
1990	727	−1.27%
1999	750	+0.35%
2007	722	−0.47%
2012	697	−0.70%
2017	678	−0.55%
2023	632	−1.16%
Source: INSEE

== See also ==
- Communes of the Haute-Marne department
