= Aignan, Gers =

Aignan
- Commune
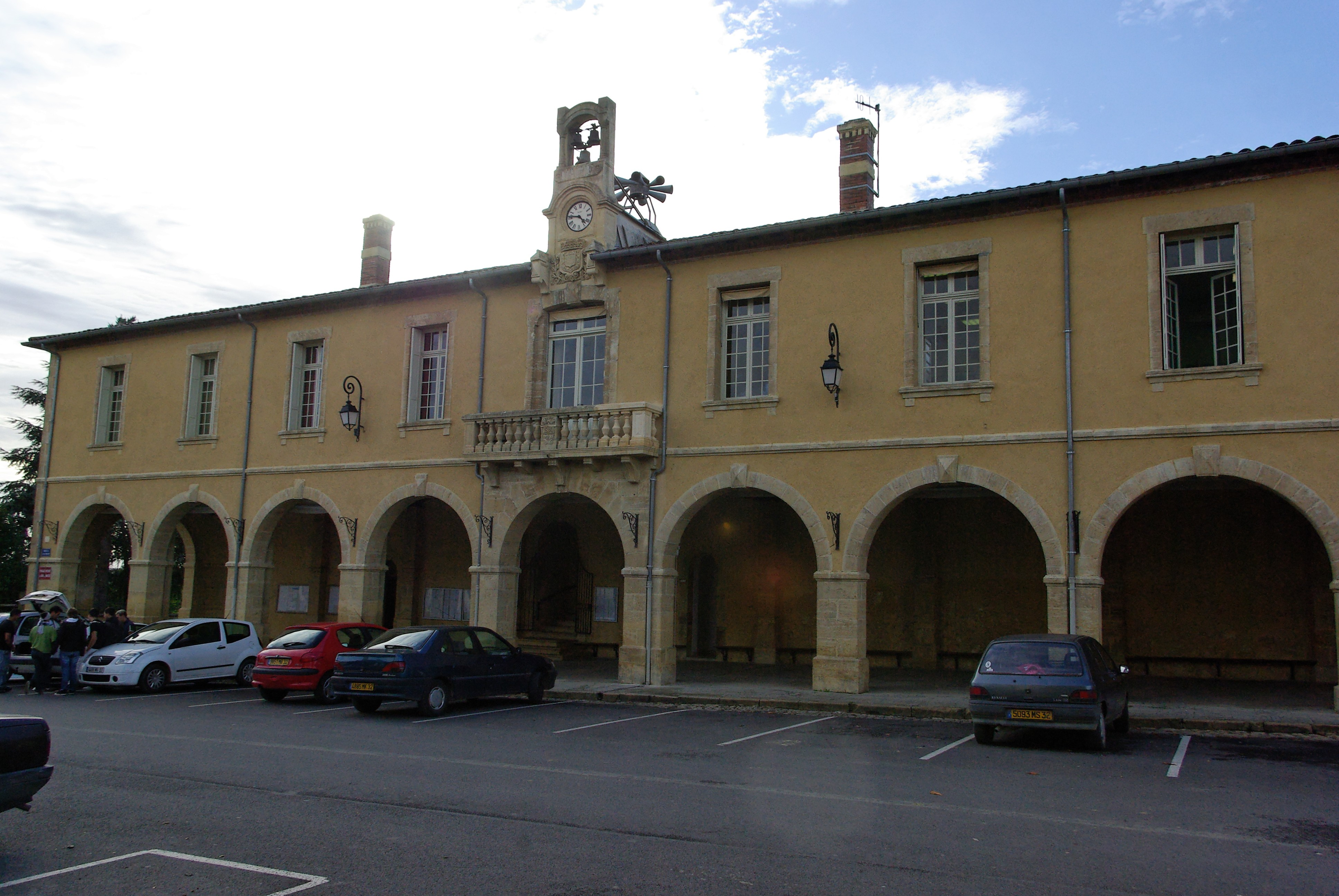
- The town hall in Aignan

- Coat of arms
- Location of Aignan
- Location within France Location within Occitanie
- Coordinates: 43°41′55″N 0°05′03″E
- Country: France
- Region: Occitania
- Department: Gers
- Arrondissement: Mirande
- Canton: Adour-Gersoise
- Intercommunality: Armagnac Adour

Government
  - Mayor (2020–2026): Gérard Pérès
- Area^{1}: 32.16 km^{2} (12.42 sq mi)
- Elevation: 165 m (541 ft)
- Highest elevation: 222 m (728 ft)
- Lowest elevation: 107 m (351 ft)
- Population (2023): 720
  - Density: 22/km^{2} (58/sq mi)
- Time zone: UTC+01:00 (CET)
  - Summer (DST): UTC+02:00 (CEST)
- INSEE/Postal code: 32001 /32290
- ^{1} French Land Register data, which excludes lakes, ponds, glaciers > 1 km^{2} (0.386 sq mi or 247 acres) and river estuaries.

Aignan (French pronunciation: [ɛɲɑ̃]; Gascon: Anhan [aˈɲa]) is a commune located in the west of the Gers department in the region of Occitania. It is a rural community with 726 inhabitants as of 2019, down from a peak of 1,771 in 1831. The name Aignan comes from the Latin "Annius" followed by the suffix "anum", which likely refers to the region's owner during the period of Roman Gaul. The town was previously known as Aignan-la-Justice.

== Geography ==
Aignan is located in the canton of Adour-Gersoise and in the arrondissement of Mirande.

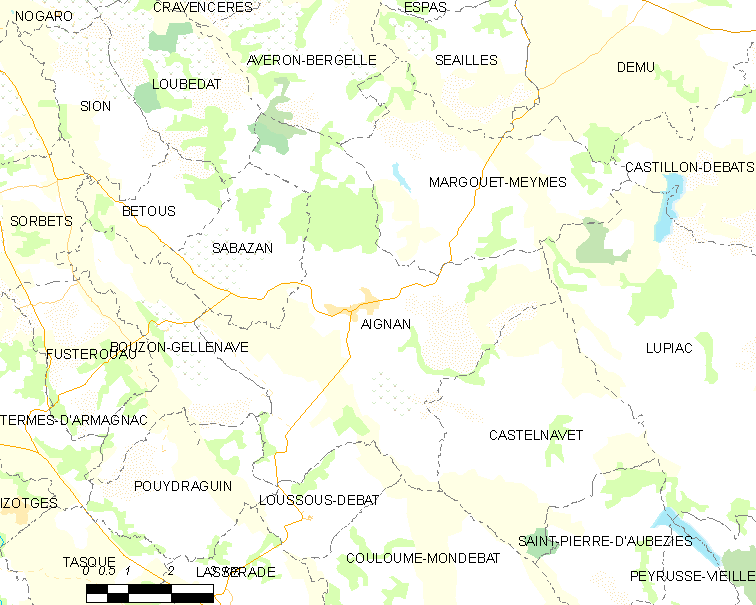
Map of Aignan and its surrounding communes

== Population ==
Historical population
Year	Pop.	±% p.a.
1968	965	—
1975	932	−0.50%
1982	941	+0.14%
1990	921	−0.27%
1999	842	−0.99%
2007	852	+0.15%
2012	746	−2.62%
2017	734	−0.32%
2023	720	−0.32%
Source: INSEE

== Notable people ==
- Yann Fouéré (1910–2011), Breton nationalist, journalist and author

== See also ==
- Communes of the Gers department
