= La Presse régionale =

French Catholic newspaper

La Presse Régionale
- Founder: Paul Féron-Vrau

La Presse Régionale (French pronunciation: [la pʁɛs ʁeʒjɔnal]) was a French Catholic press group founded by Paul Féron-Vrau in 1905.

== Foundation ==
Paul Féron-Vrau, a wealthy textile industrialist from the North of France who was nephew and heir to Philibert Vrau, founded La Presse Régionale on 1 August 1905. Féron-Vrau had already acquired the Catholic publishing house Maison de la Bonne Presse and the daily La Croix in 1900. He was joined in this new venture by his cousin André Bernard, an administrator of the Compagnie des mines de Courrières and president of the Forges et aciéries de Denain et Anzin, who served as the first chairman of the board until his death in 1913.

La Presse Régionale was organized as a consortium, with its headquarters initially located on Rue Bayard, at the Maison de la Bonne Presse, before moving to 43 Rue de Trévise in Paris just before World War I. The initial capital of one million francs, divided into 1,000 shares, was subscribed to by 178 individuals, primarily Catholic businessmen from northern France.

The group's objective was to provide financial support to provincial Catholic newspapers, enabling them to establish a solid footing, build a readership, and sustain operations. Assistance extended to technical and logistical support, including funding, distribution, access to information, and advertising networks. Early collaborators included journalists and staff from La Croix and Maison de la Bonne Presse.

== Role in French Catholic and Political Life ==
La Presse Régionale was closely aligned with the Ralliement movement and the Action Libérale Populaire (ALP). Paul Féron-Vrau and André Bernard, both prominent figures in the ALP, leveraged the press group to combat the Bloc des gauches and its anticlerical policies, including the 1905 French law on the Separation of the Churches and the State. Supported by prominent clergy and industrialists, the newspapers in the group defended religious freedom and criticized anticlerical measures.

By 1910, La Presse Régionale included 11 newspapers, operating across 57 departments. The group's capital grew to 2.85 million francs by 1913, reflecting its expanding influence.

After World War I, La Presse Régionale continued to consolidate its role in the Catholic press. By 1920, the group’s capital had increased to 3.35 million francs.

During the German Occupation in World War II, several newspapers in the group such as La République du Sud-Est adopted collaborationist stances.

Despite these setbacks, La Presse Régionale played a significant role in French Catholic journalism during its existence. Its efforts to foster a nationwide Catholic press network remain a significant chapter in the history of French media.

== Group Newspapers ==
The group owned several major newspapers, including La Liberté du Sud-Ouest, and aimed to establish a robust alternative to conservative and reactionary press networks aligned with the Fédération Républicaine.

One notable failure was Le Nouveau Journal, launched in 1925 in Lyon. Despite initial support, it struggled financially and was acquired by Le Nouvelliste in 1932.

La République du Sud-Est in Grenoble became aligned with the Vichy regime, leading to its suppression in 1944.

=== L'Éclair de l'Est ===
L'Éclair de l'Est, founded in Nancy in 1905 as the successor to Libéral de l'Est (1902–1905). It was founded at the request of Charles-François Turinaz, Bishop of Nancy, and local leaders of the Action Libérale Populaire (ALP). Published by Presse de l'Est, its shareholders included prominent figures from Lorraine such as Henry Déglin, François de Wendel, and Count Fery de Ludre. Known for its strong Catholic alignment, it ran editorials opposing the "tyranny of a parliamentary majority" and the "Masonic discipline" of the Third French Republic, it maintained close ties with parish press committees and clergy. Despite regional growth, including the absorption of smaller publications such as Le Télégramme des Vosges in 1924, the paper faced chronic financial difficulties. Circulating approximately 30,000 copies by 1939, it was overshadowed by competitors like L'Est républicain with its 140,000 copies. The newspaper ceased publication in June 1940 during World War II, with attempts to merge it with other regional papers proving unsuccessful.

=== Le Nouvelliste de Bretagne ===
Le Nouvelliste de Bretagne, established in 1901 as a Catholic alternative to the more liberal L’Ouest-Éclair, experienced significant leadership changes and political crises during its history. A major turning point came in 1928 with the departure of director Eugène Delahaye after disputes over the paper's stance towards Action Française, a position influenced by Archbishop Charost aligning with Vatican directives. Following Delahaye’s departure, Le Nouvelliste appointed Amand Terrière as editor-in-chief and Abbé Amand Jallier as director, reaffirming its Catholic identity while distancing itself from partisan politics. Financial struggles led to subsidies from L’Ouest-Éclair in the 1930s, and during the occupation, the journal ceased publication in 1944, replaced by La Voix de l’Ouest, aligned with the Resistance. By 1947, it evolved into Les Nouvelles de Bretagne et du Maine, continuing its regional Catholic journalism legacy.
