= Lycée Saint-Marc, Lyon =

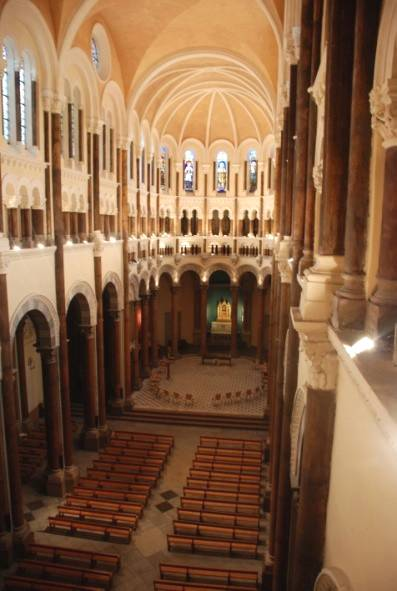
- View of the chapel in the Lycée Saint-Marc

Location
- 10 Rue Sainte Hélène; Lyon, Auvergne-Rhône-Alpes, 69287; France
- Coordinates: 45°45′18″N 4°49′42″E

Information
- Type: Private secondary school
- Motto: Latin: Ut filii lucis sitis (That you might be children of light)
- Religious affiliation: Catholic
- Denomination: Jesuit
- Patron saint: Mark the Evangelist
- Established: 1871; 155 years ago
- Principal: Pascale Masson
- Gender: Co-educational
- Website: www.lyceesaintmarc.org

Lycée Saint-Marc, Lyon, is a private Catholic secondary school and college, located in Lyon, in the heart of the Ainay district, in the Auvergne-Rhône-Alpes region of France. The school was founded by the Society of Jesus in 1871 and forms part of the Center Saint-Marc. The school is a Catholic institution under contract of association with the State.

== Rankings ==
In 2015, the school ranked 27th out of 67 in their department in terms of quality of education, and 686th at the national level.

== Notable staff ==
- Alexis Jenni, a novelist and biology teacher

== See also ==
- Catholic Church in France
- Education in France
- List of Jesuit schools
