= Le Nouvelliste de Bretagne =

- Type: Daily newspaper
- Founded: December 1901
- Ceased publication: 19 September 1944
- Political alignment: Catholic, Monarchist (initially), Conservative
- Language: French
- Headquarters: Rennes, France

Le Nouvelliste de Bretagne was a Catholic daily newspaper based in Rennes, France, founded in December 1901 and ceased publication in September 1944. It played a significant role in regional Catholic journalism, reflecting the political, social, and religious tensions of early 20th-century Brittany.

== History ==
=== Foundation and Early Years ===
Le Nouvelliste de Bretagne was established in December 1901 with financial support from Joseph Rambaud, owner of Le Nouvelliste de Lyon. Encouraged by local Catholic bishops, the newspaper was created to counter the influence of the liberal Catholic Breton daily, L'Ouest-Éclair. Its initial editorial line was Catholic and monarchist, but its circulation remained modest, with only 2,000 copies printed in 1902 despite strong support from the diocese.

In November 1905, Le Nouvelliste was acquired by La Presse Régionale, a newspaper group which aimed to strengthen the regional Catholic press. Attempts by the new owners to build closer ties with L'Ouest-Éclair were firmly rejected. Le Nouvelliste's Catholic stance meant that it was raided by the police in 1906 during the Inventory Controversy, a raid that was criticized by Parisian newspapers including the Socialist L'Humanité.

The newspaper underwent frequent leadership changes. Jules Dassonville served as director until 1908, followed by notable figures such as Abbé François Cornou and Eugène Delahaye.

=== Action Française ===
In response to the anti-clerical policies of the Cartel des Gauches in 1924–1925, Delahaye became a prominent advocate for Catholic reaction, leading to the formation of associations affiliated with the Fédération nationale catholique and becoming closer to the leading right wing organisation Action Française. This often led to clashes with rival publications like L’Ouest-Éclair.

After the Papal condemnation of Action Française in 1926 Delahaye tried to keep the paper close to Action Française, which meant he was removed in order to keep the paper faithful to the Catholic church. The Archbishop of Rennes, Alexis-Armand Charost, although previously a supporter of Action Française encouraged the newspaper to distance itself from partisan politics and align with Vatican directives. These conflicts reflected broader tensions within the Catholic Church and French society.

=== Financial and Editorial Challenges ===
The newspaper faced ongoing financial difficulties. In 1938, it received subsidies from L’Ouest-Éclair at the request of Archbishop René-Pierre Mignen. Leadership changes continued, with Abbé Ambroise Tanvet taking over as director in 1938.

Despite these challenges, Le Nouvelliste maintained a critical stance towards the Popular Front government and supported Franco’s forces during the Spanish Civil War.

=== World War II and Closure ===
During the German occupation of France in World War II, the newspaper continued to operate under Amand Terrière’s leadership but ceased publication in September 1944. It was succeeded by La Voix de l’Ouest, a Christian Democratic newspaper aligned with the Resistance. In 1947, La Voix de l’Ouest evolved into Les Nouvelles de Bretagne et du Maine.

== Legacy ==
Despite its struggles, Le Nouvelliste de Bretagne left a significant legacy as a voice for Catholic and conservative thought in Brittany. Its evolution mirrored the shifting dynamics within French Catholicism and regional politics during the early 20th century.
