= L'Ouest-Éclair =

French newspaper (1899–1944)

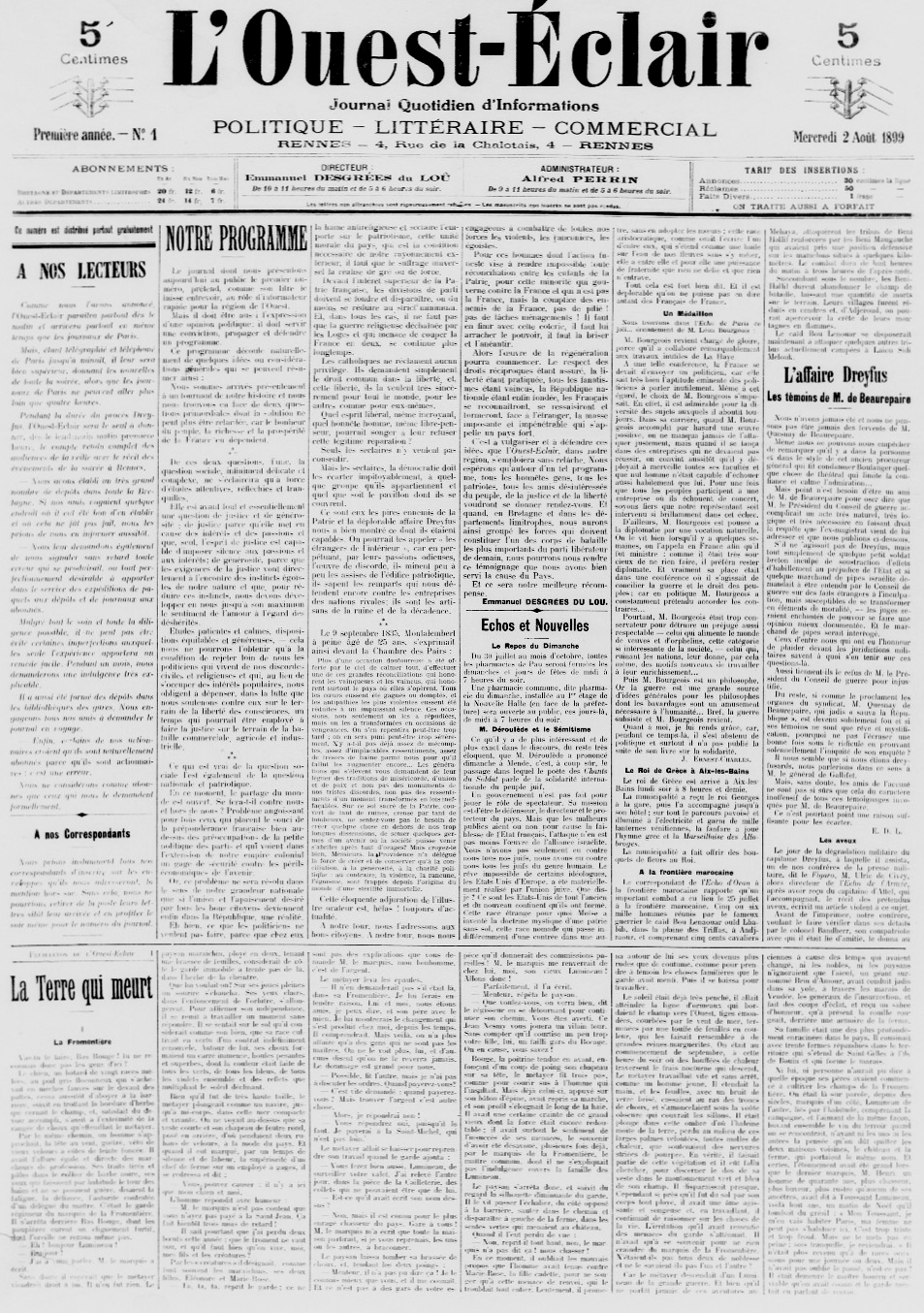
- Front page of the first issue of L'Ouest-Éclair (2 August 1899).
- Type: Daily newspaper
- Founder(s): Abbé Félix Trochu, Emmanuel Desgrées du Loû
- Founded: 2 August 1899
- Ceased publication: 1 August 1944
- Political alignment: Christian democracy
- Language: French
- Headquarters: Rennes, France

L'Ouest-Éclair (French pronunciation: [lwɛst eklɛʁ]) was a regional daily newspaper published in France from 2 August 1899 to 1 August 1944, based in Rennes. It served a broad audience in western France, covering regions such as Brittany, Normandy, Anjou, Maine, and Poitou.

The newspaper was established by two Bretons, Abbé Félix Trochu, a priest from Ille-et-Vilaine, and Emmanuel Desgrées du Loû, a lawyer from Vannes living in Brest. They were inspired by a strong Christian faith and a commitment to republican and social ideals.

After the Liberation of France, L'Ouest-Éclair was replaced by Ouest-France.

== 1899: Democracy and social justice ==
The first issue of L'Ouest-Éclair was published on 2 August 1899 in Rennes, shortly before the retrial of Alfred Dreyfus. Its initial circulation was 1,800 copies, but under the administration of Abbé Trochu, the circulation rose to 12,000 by December 1901 and continued to grow.

Trochu and Desgrées du Loû sought to rally the people of western France to support the Republic and engage politically to ensure sustained social action. At a time when the Catholic Church's ralliement to the Republic was still recent, the newspaper faced opposition from conservative Catholic and monarchist circles and in 1901 this led to the creation of the more conservative Catholic rival Le Nouvelliste de Bretagne. L'Ouest-Éclair's democratic-Christian stance set it apart in a predominantly traditionalist rural Brittany.

From its inception, L'Ouest-Éclair emphasized principles of democracy and social justice, positioning itself as a journal of ideas where information was paramount and profit secondary.

== The First World War and the interwar period ==
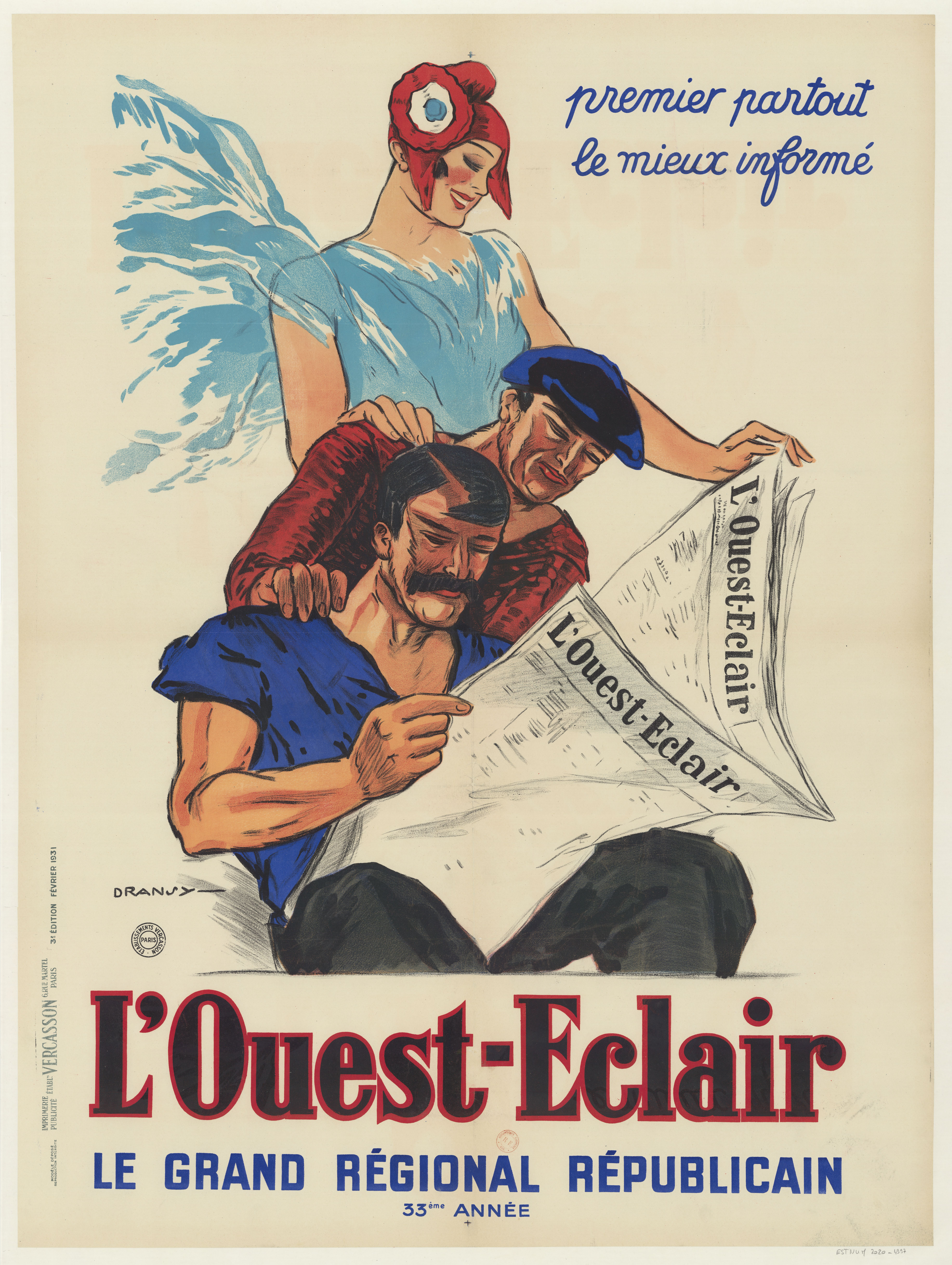
Advertisement in 1931.

Launched during the Dreyfus Affair, L'Ouest-Éclair navigated decades of challenges. Initially underfunded, dividends were only paid to shareholders—many of whom were clergy—in 1911. Despite organizational challenges during the First World War, the newspaper saw an increase in circulation.

In the 1920s, the newspaper described the emerging fascism in Italy with a degree of approval, seeing it as a counterbalance to communism.

By 1932, L'Ouest-Éclair had become the leading regional daily in France, achieving a circulation of 250,000 copies. However, tensions within the editorial team arose, leading to the departure of Trochu in 1930 over political disagreements.

== World War II ==
The outbreak of the Second World War brought severe challenges. In 1940, after the Fall of France, the newspaper faced the dilemma of continuing publication under German military censorship. Despite internal resistance, the decision was made to continue, partly to safeguard the livelihoods of its 800 employees. However, some, including Paul Hutin-Desgrées and François Desgrées du Loû, resigned in protest against compromises with the occupiers.

The last issue was published on 1 August 1944, shortly before the Liberation of Rennes on 4 August. L'Ouest-Éclair was subsequently banned for collaboration with the Vichy regime. Key figures, including its director Pierre Artur, faced charges of aiding the enemy.

== Legacy ==
Ouest-France succeeded L'Ouest-Éclair in August 1944, under a new editorial team led by Paul Hutin-Desgrées and François Desgrées du Loû.

== Sources ==
- Lagrée, Michel; Harismendy, Patrick; Denis, Michel (2000). L'Ouest-Éclair - naissance et essor d'un grand quotidien régional (in French). Rennes: Presses universitaires de Rennes. ISBN 978-2-86847-460-5. OCLC 43803512.
