= Paul Hutin-Desgrées =

French journalist and politician (1888–1975)

Member of the National Assembly of France
- In office 11 June 1946 – 1 December 1955
- Constituency: Morbihan

Personal details
- Born: Jules Paul Marie Hutin; 21 October 1888 Bovée-sur-Barboure, France
- Died: March 25, 1975 (aged 86) Le Rheu, France
- Party: MRP
- Children: 5; including Stanislas
- Relatives: Emmanuel Desgrées du Loû (father-in-law)
- Occupation: Journalist

Jules Paul Marie Hutin (21 October 1888 – 25 March 1975) was a French journalist and politician. A member of the Popular Republican Movement, he served in the National Assembly of France from 1946 to 1955.
