= French newspapers confiscated for collaboration =

At the end of World War II, several newspapers in France were seized for collaboration with the German occupation, under the law dated 11 May 1946.

In most cases, editorial teams were replaced, and the printing facilities were transferred to members of the French Resistance. Occasionally, long-established newspaper titles ceased publication altogether.

== Summary of the law ==
The law applied to:

- Newspapers, periodicals, advertising agencies, and photographic agencies.
- To avoid being penalized, companies had to have ceased operations no later than 15 days after 25 June 1940 in the northern zone (the effective date of the armistice of 22 June 1940) or 11 November 1942 in the southern zone (the date of the German invasion of this zone).
- The government retained the right to authorize titles unilaterally. A list was published by decree (to be located).
- Scientific, technical, and professional journals were exempt from seizure.
- Both material assets (printing facilities) and intangible assets (titles) were effectively transferred to the state through the intermediary of the Société nationale des entreprises de presse (National Society of Press Enterprises), which was abolished on 30 June 1992 by Article 63 of the amended finance law for 1991.

== Affected newspapers ==
- La Petite Gironde
- La France de Bordeaux et du Sud-Ouest
- Le Petit Parisien, now Le Parisien
- Le Nouvelliste de Lyon
- Le Phare de la Loire, later La Résistance de l'Ouest and subsequently Presse-Océan
- Le Petit Marseillais
- La Dépêche, in Toulouse, now La Dépêche du Midi
- Le Journal de l'Ain, in Bourg-en-Bresse, later La République nouvelle
- Cherbourg-Éclair, in Cherbourg
- L'Ouest-Éclair, in Rennes, now Ouest-France
