= Madame Figaro =

French women's magazine

- Cover of the 27/28 March 2026 issue, Constance Jablonski by David Roemer
- Editorial Director: Anne-Florence Schmitt
- Categories: Women's magazine
- Frequency: Weekly
- Total circulation: 406,067 (2025/2026)
- First issue: May 1980; 46 years ago
- Company: Groupe Figaro
- Country: France
- Based in: Paris
- Language: French
- Website: madame.lefigaro.fr
- ISSN: 0246-5205

Madame Figaro (French pronunciation: [madam fiɡaʁo]; Figaro stylised in all caps), is a French weekly womens magazine that covers fashion, culture, society, jewellery, beauty, wellness, and lifestyle. It is published as a supplement to daily newspaper Le Figaro, it is owned and operated by Groupe Figaro. Since 2005, Anne-Florence Schmitt has served as editorial director of the publication. Under her direction various there are various editor-in-chief positions. Previously Marie-Claire Pauwels served as editorial director of the publication.

Based in the 9th arrondissement of Paris, Madame Figaro began publication in 1980.

== Background ==
Madame Figaro is a French womens magazine founded in 1980, it is published as a supplement to daily newspaper Le Figaro

The magazine is a weekly publication.

=== Editors ===
Editor	Start year	End year
Editorial Director
Marie-Claire Pauwels	1980	2005
Anne-Florence Schmitt	2005	present

== History ==
The first issue of Madame Figaro was published in 1980. The launch was spearheaded by Robert Hersant and enjoyed immediate success due to its diverse contents and quality of writing. Marie-Claire Pauwels served as editor-in-chief. The magazine has its origins from a womens page that appeared in Le Figaro Magazine. In the 1980s the magazine published articles on topics sucha s sexual relationships, gender equality, and family. It published both liberal and conversation ideas, focusing on enhancing womens careers and challenging traditional roles of women. It was one of the first French publications to publishe articles on women in foreign countries.

During the last half of 2007, the circulation of Madame Figaro was 455,802 copies. In 2011, the magazine had a circulation of 449,800 copies.

== International editions ==
In 1988, the first international edition of the magazine was published in Portugal as Máxima. This was followed by editions in Japan (1990), Turkey, the United Kingdom (1993), South Korea (1994), and Greece (1994). In the 1990s the magazine expanded into China. As of 2019 the magazine has ten international editions.

=== Operating ===
- Máxima (Portugal, since 1988)
- Madame Figaro Japon (Japan, since 1990)
- Madame Figaro Greece (Greece, since 1994)
- 新视线 Madame Figaro (China, since 1999)
- Madame Figaro έκδοση κυπριακή (Cyprus, since 2005)
- Spécial Madame Figaro Arabia (the Middle East, since 2009)
- Woman Madame Figaro (Spain, since 2011)
- Madame Figaro Hong Kong (Hong Kong, since 2019)
- Madame Figaro México (México, since 2026)

=== Defunct ===
- Madame Figaro (United Kingdom, from 1993)
- Madame Figaro (South Korea, from 1994)
- Madame Figaro Thailand (Thailand, from 2003 to 2017)
- Madame Figaro Bulgaria (Bulgaria, from 2007)
- Madame Figaro Belgique / Madame Figaro Belux (Belgium and Luxembourg, until 2017)
- Madame Figaro Türkiye (Turkey, until 2020)
- Madame Figaro (Russia)

== Contributors ==
List of notable former contributors:

- Grace Kelly, Princess of Monaco
- Philippe Nassif

== Grand Prix Littéraire de l'Héroïne ==
The Grand Prix Littéraire de l'Héroïne Madame Figaro is a prize awarded every year since 2006 by the magazine. It is awarded to a writer, who by her writing, has made a contribution to the biography genre.

- 2006: Angie David, Dominique Aury (Léo Scheer)
- 2007: Dominique Bona, Camille et Paul: La passion claudel (Grasset)
- 2008: Marie-Dominique Lelièvre, Sagan à toute allure (Denoël)
- 2009: Jacqueline Mesnil-Amar, Ceux qui ne dormaient pas (Stock)
- 2010: Violaine Binet, Diane Arbus (Grasset)
- 2011: Marie Desplechin and Aya Cissoko, Danbé (Calmann-Lévy)
- 2012: Delphine de Vigan, Rien ne s'oppose à la nuit (Jean-Claude Lattès)
- 2013: Marie NDiaye, Ladivine (Gallimard)
- 2014: Lola Lafon, La Petite Communiste qui ne souriait jamais (Actes Sud)
- 2015: Valerie Toranian, L'étrangère (Flammarion)
- 2016: Alexandra Lapierre, Moura (Flammarion)
- 2017: Alexia Stresi, Looping (Stock)
- 2018: Isabelle Carré, Les rêveurs (Grasset)
- 2019: Gabriella Zalapi, Antonia (Zoé)
- 2020: Leïla Slimani, Le pays des autres (Gallimard)
- 2021: Dalie Farah, Le Doigt (Grasset)
- 2022: Agnès Desarthe, L’éternel fiancé (Points)
- 2023: Monica Sabolo, La Vie clandestine (Gallimard)
- 2024: Marie Darrieussecq, Fabriquer une femme (P.O.L)
- 2025: Mathilde Henzelin, La Saison des bêtises
- 2026: Carole Fives, Appel manqué (L'Arbalète / Gallimard)
