= Victor Cohen =

Victor Cohen may refer to:

- Benjamin Victor Cohen (1894–1983), American political figure
- Victor Cohen Hadria (born 1949), French writer
