= The Enchanted (novel) =

2014 literary novel

- Author: Rene Denfeld
- Language: English
- Genre: Literary fiction; magical realism; psychological fiction
- Publisher: Harper; HarperCollins
- Publication date: March 4, 2014 (US); March 13, 2014 (UK)
- Publication place: United States; United Kingdom
- Pages: 233–256 (depending on edition)
- Awards: Prix du Premier Roman Étranger; ALA Medal of Excellence for Fiction
- ISBN: 978-0-06-228550-8

The Enchanted is a psychological and literary novel. The story takes place in an ancient prison where a nameless prisoner finds solace in total darkness by retreating into his imagination. Released in 2014, it was critically acclaimed as a stunning first work of US-author Rene Denfeld, as well as evocative and an incredible debut. The novel won the Prix du Premier Roman Étranger in 2014, an ALA Medal of Excellence for fiction in 2015, and was nominated for several other awards.

== Plot ==
The story follows an unnamed and mute prisoner in an ancient prison. Swallowed by total darkness, he becomes enveloped in his imagination. The prisoner explains he is awaiting his death, along with many others who are supposedly enchanted by the spell of death. The prisoner was placed in a mental hospital as a child until, aged 18 years, he murdered a child. He later found refuge in a library before committing another crime and being sent to solitary confinement. In the darkness, the prisoner claims that you can envision anything you want, including golden horses and flibber-gibbets, creatures that feast on human flesh, but this is later confirmed to be a form of coping with the soul-crushing realization of being confined till death.

Soon, an investigator known as the “Lady” visits the prison, looking for an inmate called York. York has been in the prison for twelve years and had given up any attempts to appeal. The Lady examines his case file and attempts to exonerate his death row-sentence. York was revealed to have a list of crimes related to young girls and a history of sexual abuse by his mother. His mother was beautiful, yet mentally impaired, and slept with everyone in their town. It is later revealed that York was born with syphilis, and the Lady attempts to use this as a reason for York's release. However, York admits he wants to die, and the Lady realises that she is quite similar to York in her outside life, a byproduct of a violent environment.

The Lady meets an emotionally-scarred priest, and they become romantically involved. The priest visited the prison to read letters to the inmates who had been condemned to execution as a last effort to make them at peace. The Lady also meets a young white-haired boy, who received a two-year sentence, and a warden who believes that he is doing the right thing.

The protagonist's name is revealed to be Arden, and he exposes the corruption found within this prison through his imagination. At the end, Arden is put to death and laments the mother of the child he killed when he was aged 18 years. Additionally, the Lady gives up and York accepts the death penalty for his damaged soul.

== Characters ==
The narrator/Arden

The main protagonist and narrator of the story, Arden is a troubled human known for committing violent acts in his youth and being sentenced to solitary confinement while awaiting his execution. Over time, Arden begins to use his imagination in creative ways to help cope with his dilemma. He envisions golden horses, flibber gibbets (creatures that feast on human flesh), and miners in the prison walls. At the end of the story, Arden is sentenced to death and shows signs of regret and remorse regarding his past murders. Arden is clearly aware of the corruption that takes place in prison, but has also shown pleasure regarding the executions that take place in the prison, by stating he imagines beauty in the pain and that it transcends physical confinement.

The Lady

An investigator sent to the maximum-security prison to help exonerate the death sentence of a criminal named York. While over there, she laments about her own past growing up in a violent environment and believes saving York will bring her salvation. The lady believes that York’s violent tendencies were created because of his dark environment as a child. Later on, she encounters a priest whom she grows romantically close to because of their shared emotional pain. At the end, the Lady allows York to do whatever he wishes, something that he never had.

York

A criminal inmate whom the Lady tries to save. York has been an inmate on death row for 12 years, with a history of sexual abuse. Growing up, York’s mother was a prostitute who slept with every man in their town and even involved York with some of her clients, hence how York contracted a disease at a young age. York is suicidal and doesn’t plan on leaving the prison due to his broken soul that desperately seeks freedom; a privilege he never had.

The Priest

A man who visits the prison to give the prisoners a final counseling session before they are killed. The Priest is tasked with reading them letters from their loved ones. The Priest feels a sense of guilt, loneliness, disgrace, and beset for betraying his vows and has more purpose advising criminals rather than actual churchgoers. He later forms a romantic relationship with the Lady.

The White-Haired boy

A recently imprisoned 16-year-old who committed an offense and was sentenced to two years in prison.

The Warden

A man with a good heart who believes in the righteousness of his career and favors the death penalty despite finding executions displeasing. The Warden is experiencing hardship at home with his terminally ill wife and is completely oblivious to the corrupt and unjust killings that the corrections officers are performing. The Warden has a soul full of justice, but is fully blind to the evil that encompasses him.

== Publication ==
Published in 2014 in both the United States and the United Kingdom, the book contains 233-256 pages, depending on the edition, and was intended for an adult audience. Denfield took inspiration from her job as a licensed defense investigator to create the meaningful storytelling found within The Enchanted.

== Reception ==
The book received mixed reviews from critics and was criticised for narrative gaps. Consequently, regular readers critically acclaimed its powerful depiction of executions, corruption, death, and the horrific reality some of us might experience. Some readers also noted the blend of fantastical elements with a real prison was excellent. At the time of its release, it was praised by publishing circles and was regarded as compelling, but dark. It won the French Prix award and the ALA medal of excellence for fiction in 2015. It received nominations in 2014 for a Goodreads Choice Award for Fiction, with a high audience rating of 4-5 stars, and the Center for Fiction First Novel Prize; and the following year was nominated for the Andrew Carnegie Medal for Fiction.

== Adaptations ==
In 2017, director Connie Treaves created a theatre screenplay that adapted The Enchanted and its characters. The play was showcased in the Edinburgh Fringe Festival and in the Bunker Theatre, London. When interviewed, Treaves stated,

"The Enchanted is a story about death row in America, but it is also a story about how we find hope in the most terrible circumstances. It seeks to uncover the reasons why people end up committing horrific crimes and affirms that even men who have been locked up by society for what they have done are able to reach for beauty and truth. The whole world of the play is seen through the eyes of Arden – a man who has committed the worst crimes on record. Through his eyes, we are able to gain a perspective on death row – often not presented to us in the mainstream media – a world which is so surreal for an audience, yet is entirely his reality… The play covers a range of themes. Quite amazingly, it manages to address the stark reality of the lives it is addressing – cycles of abuse, economic decline, child neglect, the failures of the prison system, and the complete hopeless tragedy of death row for both those on the row and the victims; however, it balances this against strong themes of hope and the power of the imagination. Even in the most hopeless circumstances, Rene Denfeld affirms that everyone is able to find their own beauty to cling to."

— Connie Treaves

Treaves stated that she was faithful to the adaptation as she and her team were completely unknowledgeable about the death penalty. Treaves also expressed high respect and admiration for Denfeld by stating that she has read everything she has posted and should be framed as a powerful woman in the world of arts and literature.

== The author ==
As a child, Denfeld lived in poverty and struggled with an alcoholic mother and a stepfather, a registered sex offender, who opened the family home to other pedophiles. As a teenager, she ran away from home and lived on the streets, became estranged from her family, and earned an income by working for McDonald's. Leaving school in the ninth grade, Denfeld was self-taught and learned to write by reading. Later, she became a chief investigator at the Portland office of the U.S. public defender, where she primarily took care of death row exoneration cases. She fostered and adopted three children.
