= Grégoire Bouillier =

French writer

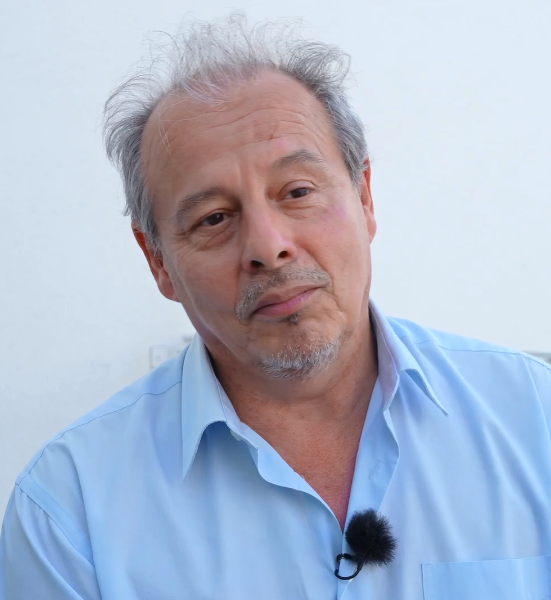
- In a 2024 interview
- Born: 22 June 1960 (age 66); Tizi Ouzou, Algeria
- Occupation: Writer
- Awards: Prix de Flore (2002)

Grégoire Bouillier (born 22 June 1960) is an Algerian-French memoirist who wrote Rapport sur moi (Report on Myself) and L'invité mystère (The Mystery Guest). Rapport sur moi won the Prix de Flore in 2002.

Bouillier is the unnamed protagonist of French artist Sophie Calle's work, Take Care of Yourself, in which Calle collected comments from 107 women to an e-mail he wrote her to end their affair. The work was exhibited in the French pavilion of the 2007 Venice Biennale.

== Works ==
=== Original French ===
- Rapport sur moi, 2002
- L'invité mystère, 2004
- Cap Canaveral, 2008

=== English translations ===
- The Mystery Guest, 2006 (translated by Lorin Stein)
- Report on Myself, 2008 (translated by Bruce Benderson)

=== Dutch translation ===
- De raadselgast.

=== German translations ===
- Ich über mich.
- Der Überraschungsgast.

=== Arabic translation ===
- Report on Myself- تقرير عن نفسي , 2014 ( Publisher - Al Kotob Khan )
