= Goolrick =

Goolrick is a surname. Notable people with the surname include:

- C. O'Conor Goolrick (1876–1960), American lawyer and politician
- Robert Goolrick (1948–2022), American writer
