= Prix du Premier Roman =

French literary prize

- Description: Best first novel by a French and a foreign author
- Country: France
- Presented by: Jury of literary critics
- Website: www.lesprixlitteraires.com/prix-du-premier-roman.html

The Prix du Premier Roman (First Novel Prize) is a French literary prize awarded to an unpublished novelist between the ages of 18 and 30. The monetary reward is 3,000 Euros.

The prize was first awarded in 1977. Starting with 1998 a separate award is given to the best first novel by a foreign writer. The jury is made out of literary critics and the current president of the jury is the French historian and critic Joël Schmidt.

== Winners of Prix du Premier Roman ==
- 1977: Michel Arrivé, Les remembrances du vieillard idiot, (Flammarion)
- 1978:
- 1979: Marco Koskas, Balace Bounel
- 1980: Dan Franck, Les Calendes grecques, Calmann-Lévy
- 1981: Annick Geille, Portrait d'un amour coupable, Éditions Grasset
- 1982: Bruno Racine, Le Gouverneur de Morée, Grasset
- 1983: Elvire Murail, Escalier C, S. Messinger
- 1984: Jean-Philippe Arrou-Vignod, Le Rideau sur la nuit, Gallimard
- 1985:
- 1986: Alexandre Jardin, Bille en tête, Gallimard
- 1987: Jean-François Merle, Cale sèche, (Arléa)
- 1988: Nadine Diamant, Désordres, (Flammarion)
- 1989: Louis-Jacques Liandier, Comme un voleur dans la nuit
- 1990: Caroline Tiné, L'immeuble, Albin Michel
- 1991: Patrick Séry, Le Maître et le scorpion, Flammarion
- 1992: Isabelle Jarry, L'Homme de la passerelle, Mercure de France
- 1993: Christophe Bataille, Annam, Arléa
- 1994: Jean-François Kervéan, La Folie du moment, Calmann-Lévy
- 1995: Sophie Fontanel, Sacré Paul, NiL Éditions
- 1996: Pascale Roze, Le Chasseur Zéro, Albin Michel
- 1997: Raymond Bozier, Lieu-dit, Calmann-Lévy
- 1998: Christine Chaufour Verheyen, Rive dangeureuse, Fayard
- 1999: Boualem Sansal, Le Serment des barbares, Gallimard
- 2000: Bruno Gibert, Claude (Fayard)
- 2001: Claire Béchet, Entre parenthèses, Calmann-Lévy
- 2002: Christophe Dufossé, L'Heure de la sortie, Albin Michel
- 2003: Yasmina Trabouli, for Les Enfants de la place, Mercure de France
- 2004: Caroline Sers, for Tombent les avions, Buchet/Chastel
- 2005: Hédi Kaddour, for Waltenberg, Gallimard
- 2006: Max Monnehay, for Corpus Christine, Albin Michel
- 2007: Ingrid Thobois, for Le Roi d'Afghanistan ne nous a pas mariés, Éditions Phébus
- 2008: Thierry Dancourt, for Hôtel de Lausanne, Éditions de La Table Ronde
- 2009: Jocelyn Bonnerave, for Nouveaux indiens, Éditions du Seuil
- 2010: Victor Cohen Hadria, for Les trois saisons de la rage
- 2011: Marien Defalvard, for Du temps qu'on existait, Grasset
- 2012: Christophe Carlier, for L'Assassin à la pomme verte, Serge Safran
- 2013: Clément Bénech, for L'Été slovène, Flammarion
- 2014: Jean-Pierre Orban, for Vera, Mercure de France
- 2015: Didier Castino, for Après le silence, Liana Levi
- 2016: Gaël Faye, for Petit Pays, Grasset
- 2017: Jean-Baptiste Andrea, for Ma reine, L'Iconoclaste
- 2018: Clélia Renucci, for Concours pour le Paradis, Albin Michel
- 2019: Géraldine Dalban-Moreynas, for On ne meurt pas d'amour, Plon
- 2020: Ketty Rouf, for On ne touche pas, Albin Michel
- 2021: Maud Ventura, for Mon mari, L'iconoclaste
- 2022: Maria Larrea, for Les gens de Bilbao naissent où ils veulent, Grasset

== Winners of Prix du Premier Roman Etranger ==
- 1998: Martin Suter, Small World (Switzerland)
- 1999: Boualem Sansal, Le Serment des barbares (Algeria)
- 2000: Jim Fergus, One Thousand White Women: The Journals of May Dodd (United States)
- 2001: Keith Ridgway, The Long Falling (Ireland)
- 2002: Gwen Edelman, War Story (United States)
- 2003: Lavinia Greenlaw, Mary George of Allnorthover (United Kingdom)
- 2004: Inderjit Badhwar, The Chamber of Perfumes (India)
- 2005: Samina Ali, Madras on Rainy Days (India)
- 2006: Benjamin Kunkel, Indecision (United States)
- 2007: Dinaw Mengestu, The Beautiful Things That Heaven Bears (United States)
- 2008: James Cañón, Tales from the Town of Widows (Colombia)
- 2009: Chloe Aridjis, Book of Clouds (United States)
- 2010: Amanda Smyth, Black Rock (Ireland)
- 2011: Nic Pizzolatto, Galveston: A Novel (United States)
- 2012: Amy Waldman, The Submission (United States)
- 2013: Patrick McGuinness, The Last Hundred Days (United Kingdom)
- 2014: Rene Denfeld, The Enchanted: A Novel (United States)
- 2015: (ex-æquo) Vanessa Barbara, Noites de alface (Brazil)
- 2015: (ex-æquo) Maja Haderlap, Angel of Oblivion (Austria)
- 2016: Davide Enia, On Earth as It Is in Heaven: A Novel (Italy)
- 2017: Katharina Winkler, Blue Jewellery (Germany)
- 2018: Shih-Li Kow, The Sum of Our Follies (Malaysia)
- 2019: Sana Krasikov, The Patriots (United States)
- 2020: Olja Savičević, Adios Cow Boy (Croatia)
- 2021: Daniel Loedel, Hadès, Argentine (United States)
- 2022: Jarred McGinnis, The Coward (United States)
