= Prix de Flore =

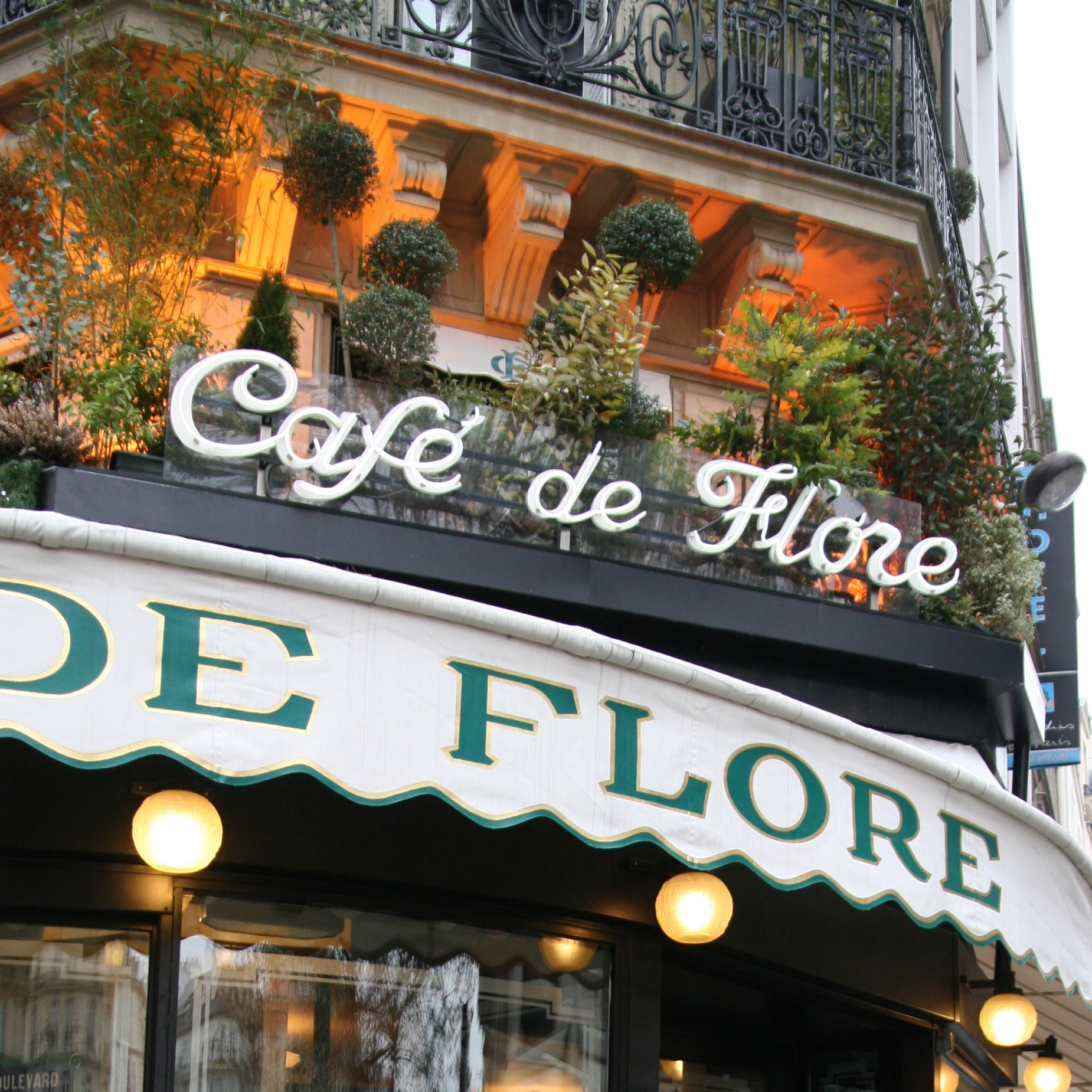
Café de Flore, Paris

The Prix de Flore is a French literary prize founded in 1994 by Frédéric Beigbeder. The aim of the prize is to reward youthful authors and it is judged by a panel of journalists. It is awarded yearly in November, at the Café de Flore in Paris. The prize only applies to French-language literature, even though the author does not have to be French. Bruce Benderson was the first non-French author to receive the prize, in 2004, for the novel Autobiographie érotique (released in English as The Romanian: Story of an Obsession). The laureate of the Prix de Flore wins about 6,000 Euros and is entitled to drink a glass of Pouilly-Fumé, a white wine from the Loire region of France, at the Café de Flore every day for a year. The laureate's name is engraved on the glass.

== Laureates ==
- 1994: Cantique de la racaille by Vincent Ravalec
- 1995: Le Pas du loup by Jacques A. Bertrand
- 1996: Le Sens du combat by Michel Houellebecq
- 1997: Le Chameau sauvage by Philippe Jaenada
- 1998: Les Jolies Choses by Virginie Despentes
- 1999: Nicolas Pages by Guillaume Dustan
- 2000: Mémoire courte by Nicolas Rey
- 2001: L'Empire de la morale by Christophe Donner
- 2002: Rapport sur moi by Grégoire Bouillier
- 2003: Mammifères by Pierre Mérot
- 2004: Autobiographie érotique by Bruce Benderson
- 2005: Boys boys boys by Joy Sorman
- 2006: Rendez-vous by Christine Angot
- 2007: Ni d'Ève ni d'Adam by Amélie Nothomb
- 2008: La meilleure part des hommes by Tristan Garcia
- 2009: L'hyper Justine by Simon Liberati
- 2010: Le jour du roi by Abdellah Taïa
- 2011: Du temps qu'on existait by Marien Defalvard
- 2012: Zénith-Hôtel by Oscar Coop-Phane
- 2013: Tout cela n'a rien à voir avec moi by Monica Sabolo
- 2014: L'Aménagement du territoire by Aurélien Bellanger
- 2015: La Fleur du Capital by Jean-Noël Orengo
- 2016: Double Nationalité by Nina Yargekov, Éditions P.O.L
- 2017: (ex-æquo), L'invention des corps by Pierre Ducrozet Actes Sud
- 2018: (ex-æquo), Paname Underground by Johann Zarca, Éditions Goutte d'Or
- 2018: Anatomie de l'amant de ma femme by Raphaël Rupert Éditions L'Arbre vengeur
- 2019: Rhapsodie des oubliés by Sofia Aouine Éditions de la Martinière
- 2020 : La Grâce by Thibault de Montaigu, Éditions Plon
- 2021: Le Voyant d’Etampes by Abel Quentin, Éditions de l'Observatoire
- 2022: Chienne et louve, by Joffrine Donnadieu, Gallimard
- 2023: Western, by Maria Pourchet, Stock
- 2024: Marc, by Benjamin Stock, Rue Fromentin
- 2025: Toutes les vies, Julia Lanoë, Stock
