= Pascale Roze =

French playwright and novelist

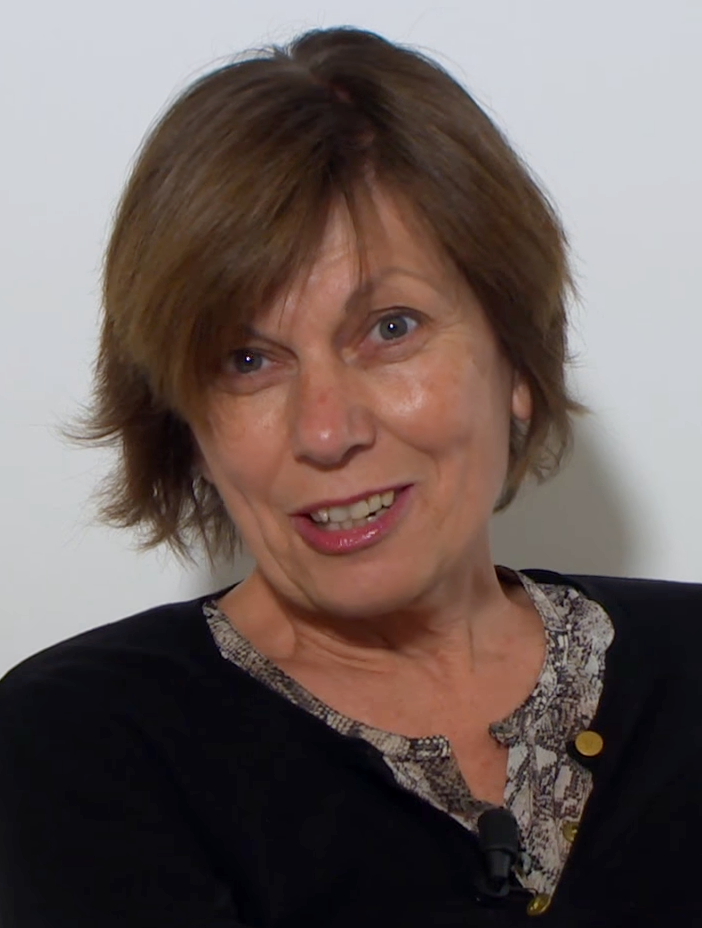
- Roze in 2014
- Born: 1954 (age 71–72) Saigon, French Indochina
- Occupation: playwright and novelist
- Notable awards: Prix Goncourt 1996 Le Chasseur Zéro; Prix du Premier Roman 1996 Le Chasseur Zéro

Pascale Roze (born 1954 Saïgon, Vietnam) is a French playwright, and novelist.

After a literature degree, she worked for fifteen years with Gabriel Garran International French Theater.

== Awards ==
- 1996 Prix Goncourt and Prix du Premier Roman for the novel Le Chasseur Zéro

== Works ==
=== Plays ===
- Mary contre Mary
- Tolstoï la Nuit, 1981, prix Arletty de l'auteur dramatique.

=== Novels ===
- Histoires dérangées, recueil de nouvelles, Julliard, 1994, ISBN 978-2-260-01025-8 (LGF/Le Livre de Poche, 1998, ISBN 978-2-253-14442-7)
- Le Chasseur Zéro A. Michel, 1996, ISBN 978-2-226-08708-9
- Ferraille, Albin Michel, 1999
- Lettre d'été, Albin Michel, 2000
- Parle-moi, Albin Michel, 2003, ISBN 978-2-226-13395-3
- Un homme sans larmes, Stock, 2005, ISBN 978-2-234-05751-7
- L'Eau rouge, Gallimard, 2007, ISBN 978-2-07-034323-2
- Itsik, Stock, 2008
