= Rene Denfeld =

American author

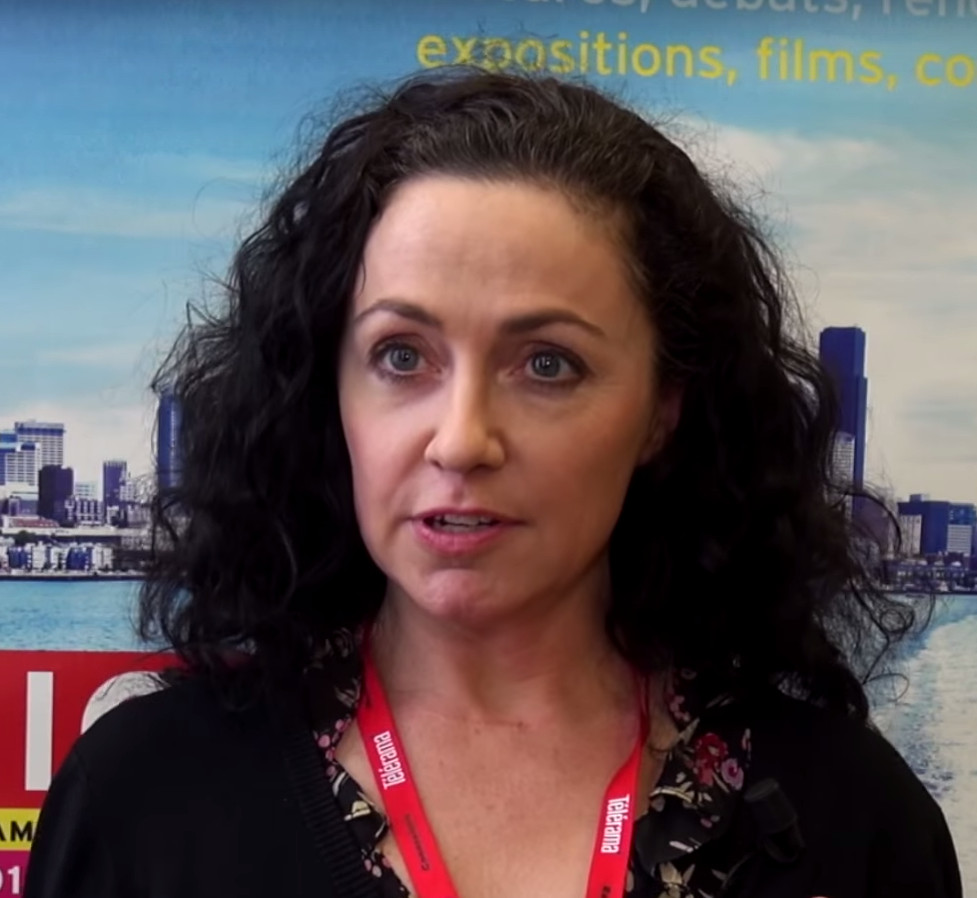
- Denfeld in 2014
- Born: c.1968 (age 57–58)
- Occupations: Author; investigator for the U.S. public defender
- Children: 3 (all adopted)
- Writing career
- Language: English
- Years active: 2014–
- Genre: Literary fiction
- Notable work: The Enchanted (2014)
- Notable awards: Prix du Premier Roman Etranger; ALA Medal of Excellence in Fiction
- Website: renedenfeld.com

Rene Denfeld (born c. 1968) is an American author and investigator for the Portland office of the U.S. public defender. She works with sex-trafficking victims and death row prisoners, who have inspired her writing.

== Biography ==
Since 2015, Denfeld has openly discussed her childhood, raised by an alcoholic mother and was sexually and emotionally abused by her stepfather, a sex offender who opened the family home to other pedophiles. As a teenager, she ran away from home and lived on the streets, became estranged from her family, and earned an income by working for McDonald's. She left school in the ninth grade, and taught herself to write by reading. Denefeld is now an author, teacher, coach, justice worker, and licensed defense investigator.

Her first novel, The Enchanted, was awarded the Prix du Premier Roman Etranger award and an ALA Medal of Excellence for Fiction. The book was a finalist for the Center for Fiction First Novel Prize, The Oregonian's Best Book of the Year, listed for the Dublin Literary Award for Fiction, and was long-listed for the Andrew Carnegie Medal for Excellence in Fiction. Her other works include The Child Finder, Sleeping Giants, and The Butterfly Girl. She has written for The New York Times Magazine, The Oregonian and the Philadelphia Inquirer.

Denfeld, who lives in Portland, Oregon, is a foster mother to three children, all who came from traumatized childhoods, adopting each child. In 2017, she won both The New York Times Hero of the Year Award and the Breaking the Silence Award for using her fictional works to highlight social inequity, especially impacting children.

== Selected published works ==
- The Enchanted (New York and London: HarperCollins; 2014). ISBN 978-0-297-87051-7.
- The Child Finder (New York and London: HarperCollins; 2017). ISBN 978-0-062-65906-4.
  - Trouver l'enfant (in French); translated by Pierre Bondil.
- The Butterfly Girl (New York: HarperCollins; London: Hachette; 2019). ISBN 978-1-474-60763-6.
  - La Fille aux papillons (in French); translated by Pierre Bondil.
- Sleeping Giants (New York: HarperCollins; 2025). ISBN 978-0-063-01474-9.
