= Marie-Claire Pauwels =

French journalist (1945–2011)

Marie-Claire Pauwels (3 September 1945, 15th arrondissement of Paris – 22 May 2011) was a French journalist, the daughter of Suzanne Brégeon and Louis Pauwels. In April 1980, she launched the magazine Madame Figaro of which she became the first editor-in-chief and received the Prix Roger Nimier in 2003 for her autobiographical work Fille à papa.

In 1975, she created the magazine Jacinte of which she became editor-in-chief until 1980. She then took over, under the authority of her father, the direction of the women sections of Le Figaro Magazine.

== Biography ==
Marie-Claire Pauwels is the daughter of Suzanne Brégeon and Louis Pauwels. She has two children: Louis (from her first marriage to Éric Lecoeur, a painter, whom she married in 1970) and Eléonore (from her second marriage to Arthur de La Grandière, a businessman, whom she married in 1991).

After attending school in Neuilly-sur-Seine, Saint-Germain-en-Laye, and the Lycée et collège Victor-Duruy in Paris, she enrolled at the Center for Journalism Training.

== Bibliography ==
- 1988: Mon chéri, Éditions Flammarion ISBN 978-2-0806-6042-8; 1989, J'ai lu, ISBN 978-2-2772-2599-7
- 2002: Fille à papa, Albin Michel, ISBN 978-2-2261-3607-7 — Prix Roger Nimier (2003)
