= Shih-Li Kow =

Malaysian writer (born 1968)

- Born: 1968 (age 56–57) Malaysia
- Occupation: Writer of short stories, novelist
- Notable works: Ripples (2008); The Sum of Our Follies (2014)
- Notable awards: Prix du Premier Roman Etranger (2018)

Shih-Li Kow is a Malaysian writer born in 1968. She is best known for short story collections, including Ripples and Other Stories (2008) and her award-winning novel The Sum of Our Follies (2014).

== Biography ==
Kow holds a degree in chemical engineering, and resides in Kuala Lumpur with her son and extended family. Her book Ripples and Other Stories was shortlisted for the 2009 Frank O'Connor International Short Story Award.

Her debut novel, The Sum of Our Follies (French trans. La Somme de nos Folies by Frederic Grellier), was awarded the 2018 Prix du Premier Roman Etranger.

== Awards ==
Year	Work	Award	Category	Result	Ref
2009	Ripples and Other Stories	Frank O'Connor International Short Story Award	—	Shortlisted	
2018	The Sum of Our Follies	Prix du Premier Roman	Étranger	Won	
2023	"Relative Distance"	Commonwealth Short Story Prize	Asia	Shortlisted	

== Works ==
Short story collections

- —— (2007). News from Home. Silverfish. ISBN 9789833221196.
- —— (2008). Ripples and Other Stories. Silverfish. ISBN 9789833221233.
- —— (2023). Bone Weight and Other Stories (paperback 1st ed.). Buku Fixi. ISBN 9789670042886.

Novel

- —— (2014). The Sum of Our Follies. Silverfish. ISBN 9789833221479.
