= Samantha Barendson =

French poet

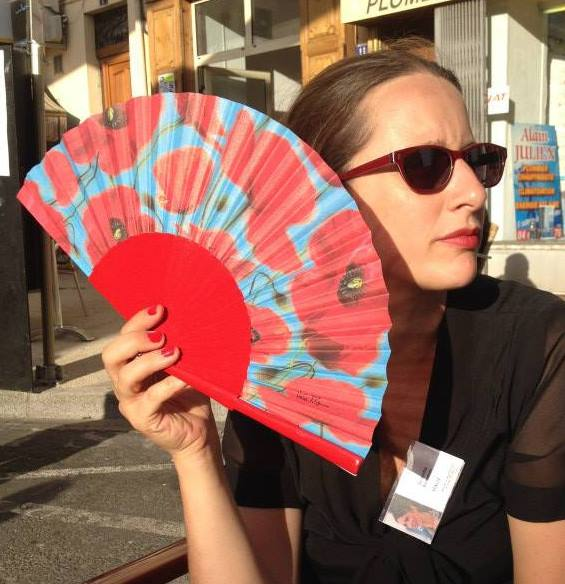
- Born: April 16, 1976 (age 50) Vilanova i la Geltrú (Spain)
- Occupation: Poet
- Language: French Spanish Italian
- Genre: poet

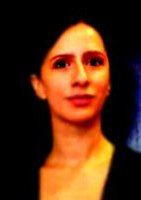
Samantha Barendson

Samantha Barendson (born 16 April 1976) is a French poet born in Spain to an Argentinian mother and an Italian father. She currently lives in Lyon. She speaks four languages and identifies as Franco-Italo-Argentinian. She was selected by the European project "Versopolis" to attend several poetry festivals in Europe. She is member of The union of poets who will die someday, whose purpose is to promote poetry for everyone and everywhere. In March 2015, Barendson received the French poetry "René Leynaud" award for her poetry book "Le citronnier" (The lemon tree), which details her investigation into the life of her late father.

== Biography ==
Born in 1976 in Spain to an Italian father and an Argentine mother, she has one sister and two brothers. Samantha Barendson currently lives in Lyon and works at the École normale supérieure de Lyon. Like her, her writing moves fluidly between languages.

A writer of poetry and plays, she particularly enjoys collaborating with other poets, painters, illustrators, photographers, dancers, and musicians.

She also loves to recite, shout, scream, or sing her lyrics on stage, feeling a bit frustrated that she isn’t a tango singer.

After studying Latin American literature at Lumière University Lyon 2 a particular focus on Cortázar’s short stories and the absence of punctuation in Gabriel García Márquez The Autumn of the Patriarch—she turned her attention to translation and then to writing.

Along with Katia Bouchoueva, Béatrice Brérot, Yve Bressande, Grégoire Damon, Bernard Deglet, Rafaële Mamane, Grégory Parreira, Michel Thion, and Aurora Vélez Garcia, she is a member of the collective “Le syndicat des poètes qui vont mourir un jour” (The Union of Poets Who Will Die One Day), whose main goal is to promote poetry for everyone, everywhere: "To promote spoken poetry; bringing it out of books to make it accessible to everyone; daring to bring poetry to all places; offering dynamic public readings as well as performances".

Along with Nina Yargekov and Karim Kattan, she has been a member of the industrial rock band KNS since 2018.
