= Nina Yargekov =

French writer

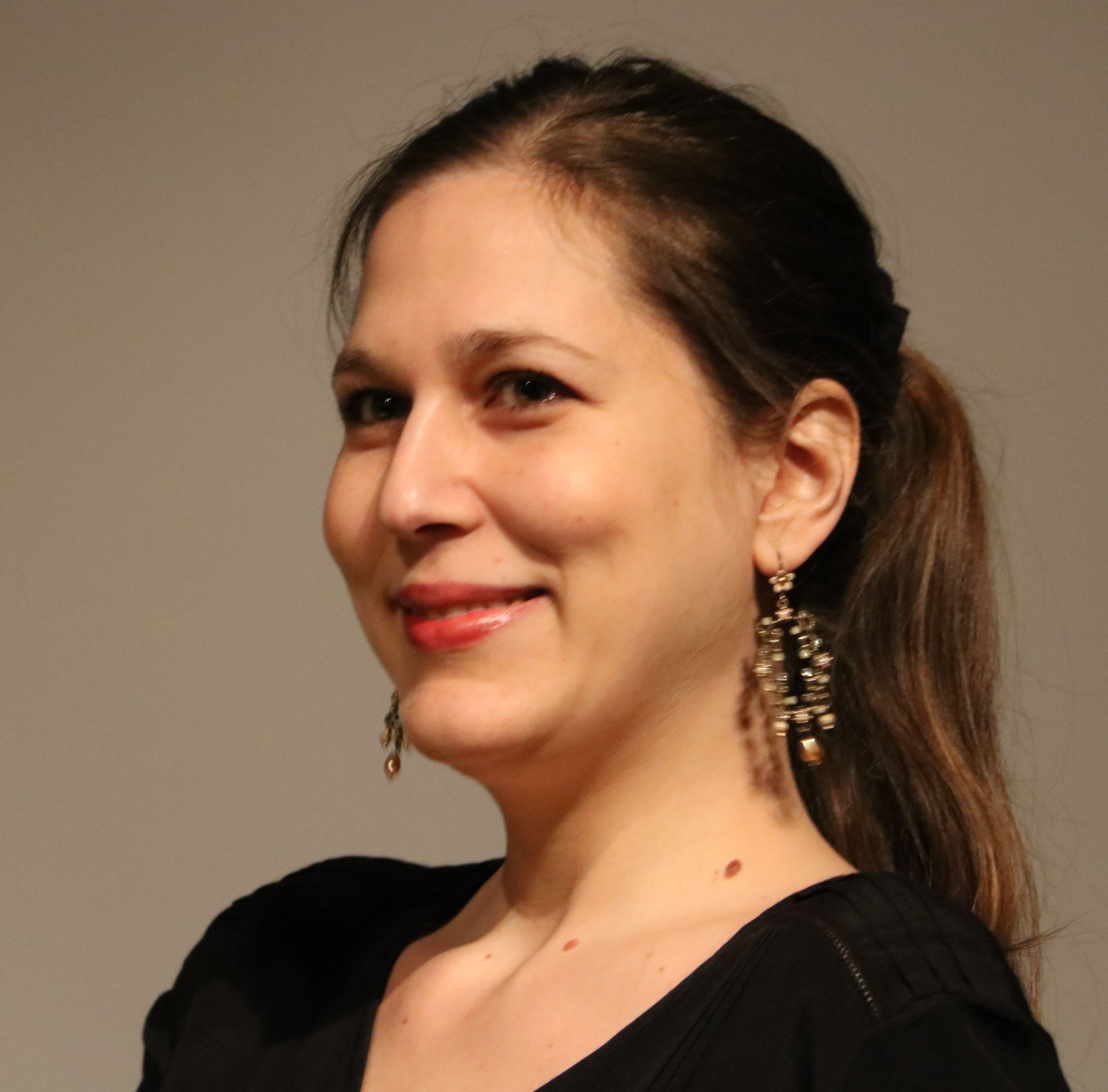
- Nina Yargekov in 2017
- Born: July 21, 1980 (age 46); France
- Occupation: Novelist
- Writing career
- Language: French
- Notable work: Double nationalité (Dual Nationality)
- Notable awards: Prix de Flore (2016)

Nina Yargekov (born 21 July 1980) is a French-Hungarian novelist and translator.

== Life and career ==
Yargekov was born in France to Hungarian parents. She studied Sociology and is a translator and interpreter.

She published her first book in 2009, Tuer Catherine (Kill Catherine), published by Éditions P.O.L, a novel which critics have labelled as somewhat autobiographical in nature, which led certain commentators to compare Yargekov to other well-known French authors such as Chloé Delaume and Max Monnehay. Chloé Delaume had herself mentioned that she had followed Yargekov before the publication of her first novel, which she described as "an extremely unique voice. I followed her manuscript through all its different versions, and I am so happy that it will finally be published next winter through POL." In 2011, she published Vous serez mes témoins (You will be my witnesses), a novel about 'fake identity in mourning'.

Her novel Double Nationalité (Dual Nationality) - the story of an amnesiac woman who finds herself in an airport with two passports, two cultures, two languages - was awarded the Prix de Flore on the 8 November 2016.

Also a musician and singer, Yargekov has since 2018 been part of the industrial rock group KNS with Samantha Barendson and Karim Kattan.

== Works ==
=== Novels ===
- Tuer Catherine (Kill Catherine), éditions P.O.L, 2009
- Vous serez mes témoins (You will be my witnesses), éditions P.O.L, 2011
- Double Nationalité (Dual Nationality), éditions P.O.L, 2016 - winner of the 2016 Prix de Flore

=== Collections ===
- L'autre Iseut (The Other Iseut), published in Et encore un livre (And Another Book), directed by Marie Darrieussecq, Centre Dramatique National d’Orléans, 2009
- Comme Erika (Like Erika), published in Mon corps est un champ de bataille (My Body is a Battlefield), Ma colère, 2009
- Panoplie argumentative (Argumentative Costume), published in Alim, directed by Émilie Notéris, IMHO, 2010
- Y comme Yourcenar (Y is for Yourcenar), published in Un livre peut en cacher un autre (One Book Can Hide Another), alphabet book illustrated by Christian Lacroix and sold in bookshops, 2014

=== Journals ===
Publications in the journals Cahier critique de poésie (Critical Notebook of Poetry - CipM), Korunk, Rouge-déclic, Raise magazine, TINA...
