= The Romanian: Story of an Obsession =

2004 memoir by Bruce Benderson

- First edition (French)
- Author: Bruce Benderson
- Original title: Autobiographie érotique
- Language: French
- Genre: LGBT, Travel literature & Autobiographical novel
- Publisher: Editions Payot & Rivages
- Publication date: 26 October 2004 (France)
- Publication place: France
- Media type: Print (Hardback & Paperback)
- Pages: 374 pp
- ISBN: 2-7436-1291-6
- OCLC: 401159442

The Romanian: Story of an Obsession is a true-to-life memoir by Bruce Benderson. The autobiographical text describes Benderson's encounters and journeys with a male Romanian street hustler through Romania and Hungary, whom he meets while on a journalism assignment and falls in love with. The plot is intertwined with a travelogue of Romania and references to Romanian history and culture, such as the life of the artist Constantin Brâncuși, the writer Panait Istrati and the love affair between Romania's interbellum king, Carol II, and his mistress, Magda Lupescu.

The book was first published in French, in 2004, under the title Autobiographie érotique (Erotic autobiography). It won the prestigious Prix de Flore award in 2004, thus making Benderson the first US author to win the prize. In 2006, it was published in English, released in the United States and the United Kingdom.
