= Le Chasseur Zéro =

Novel by Pascale Roze

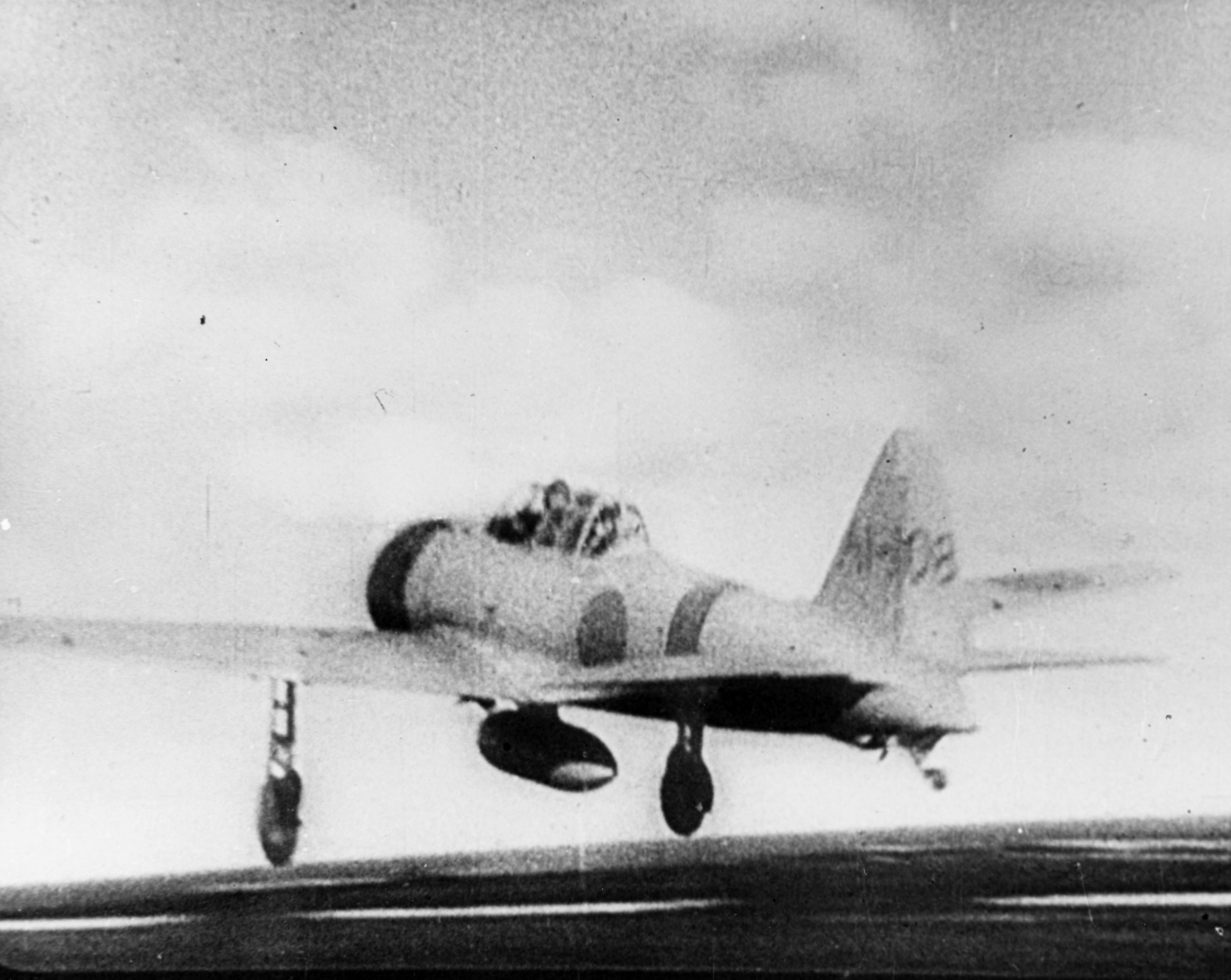
- A Japanese Navy Mitsubishi A6M2 "Zero" fighter takes off from the aircraft carrier Akagi, on its way to attack Pearl Harbor during the morning of 7 December 1941. The aircraft was flown by PO2c Sakae Mori, 1st koku kantai, 1st koku sentai, and flew with the second wave.
- Editor: éditions Albin Michel
- Author: Pascale Roze
- Language: French
- Genre: novel
- Publication date: 22 August, 1996
- Publication place: France
- Pages: 163

Le Chasseur Zéro (lit. The Zero Fighter) is a novel by the French writer, Pascale Roze. Published on August 22 of 1996, Le Chasseur Zero gained the attention of author François Nourissier, who was president of the Académie Goncourt at the time. It was then awarded the Prix Goncourt and the Prix du Premier Roman for the year of 1996.

== Summary ==
Le Chasseur Zéro is set in the Pacific theater of World War II. The plot begins with a Japanese kamikaze pilot who, in April of 1945, manages to strike an American Battleship (The USS Maryland) off of the island of Okinawa while flying a Mitsubishi A6M (commonly called a Zero by both axis and allied forces). The plot then shifts forward in time three months, when a girl named Laura Carlson receives news of her father's death aboard the same battleship. Rather than finding closure, this revelation adds to the interpersonal problems of the characters: in France, Laura's mother and grandparents begin to grow apart, and no one would explain to Laura the circumstances of her father's death. Upon learning the truth, she begins to repeatedly hear the screaming sound of the diving Zero in her head and nothing can make the noise stop. The memory of her father's death begins to upset her studies and her relationships.

== Publication history ==
The first edition of Le Chasseur Zéro was printed in Paris by Éditions Albin Michel, which began releasing both hardcover and paperback/softcover in August of 1996 (ISBN 2226087087). In 1998, another paperback/softcover edition was published by Le Livre de Poche (ISBN 2253144207).
