= Marco Koskas =

French-Israeli writer

Marco Koskas is a French-Israeli writer.

== Biography ==
His novel Balace Bounel won the Prix du Premier Roman award for young novelists in 1979.

In 1980, he joined the Editions Grasset, thanks to Bernard-Henri Lévy, to publish Destino.

In 2018, his novel Bande de Français, which was self-published on CreateSpace, was nominated for the Prix Renaudot.

== Books ==
=== Novels ===
- Balace Bounel, Ramsay, 1979; rééd. Pocket, 1989 (prix du premier roman)
- Destino, Grasset, 1981
- L’Homme de paille, Calmann Levy, 1988
- L’Étrangère (récit), Calmann Levy, 1988
- La Position Tango, J.-C. Lattès, 1990
- Albert Schweitzer ou le Démon du bien (biographie), J.-C. Lattès, 1992; rééd. Livre de Poche, 1992
- Arafat ou le palestinien imaginaire (biographie), J.-C. Lattès, 1994
- J’ai pas fermé l’œil de l'été, Julliard, 1995
- L’Hindou assis sur son trésor (récit), JC Lattès, 1997
- Love and stress, Laffont, 2002
- Avoue d'abord, La Table Ronde, 2007
- Aline, pour qu’elle revienne (roman), éditions Baleine, 2009
- Mon cœur de père (journal), Fayard, 2012
- Ivresse du reproche (roman), Fayard, 2013

=== Autoedited novels ===
- Bande de Français, Galligrasud, Amazon, 2018
- Toutes les femmes ou presque, Galligrasud, Amazon, 2019

=== Theatre ===
- Le Roi des Schnorrers, Lansmann, 2002
- Dov de Deauville, inédit (sous-titres en hébreu d'Emmanuel Pinto)
