= Jean-Philippe Arrou-Vignod =

French crime writer

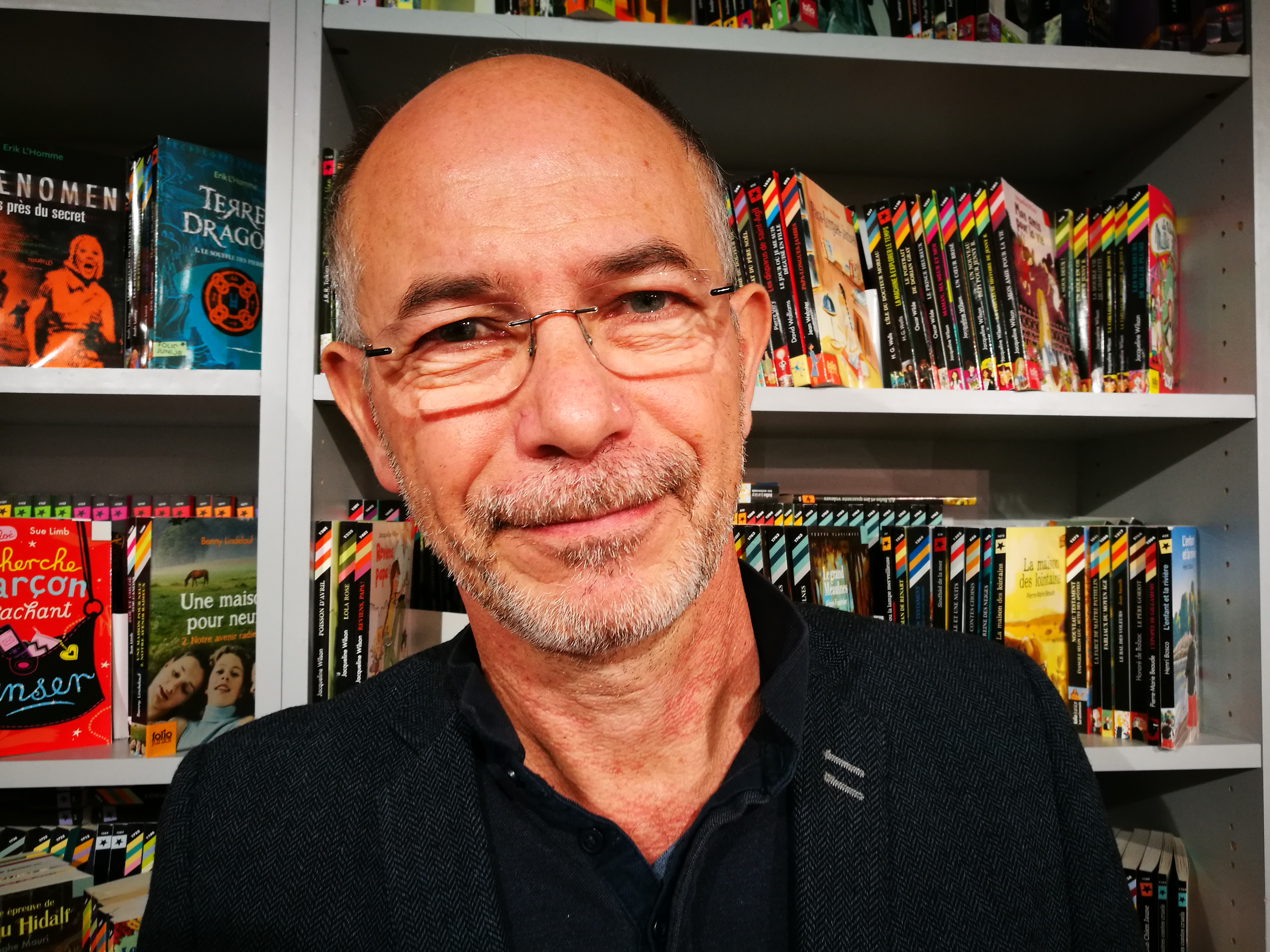
- Jean-Philippe Arrou-Vignod at the Salon du livre et de la presse jeunesse in Montreuil, in December 2017
- Born: 18 September 1958 (age 67); Bordeaux, France
- Occupation: Novelist
- Writing career
- Language: French
- Genres: Children's literature, Detective novel
- Notable awards: Prix du Premier Roman (1984) Prix Renaudot des lycéens (1997)

Jean-Philippe Arrou-Vignod (born 18 September 1958) is a French novelist. He is known for the series Enquête au collège and the Une famille aux petits oignons stories.

== Personal life ==
He was second among six boys in the family.

== Career ==
While beginning his career as a teacher in 1989, he received the First Roman Award for Le Rideau de Nuit.

== Works ==
=== General ===
==== With Gallimard ====
- 1984: Le rideau sur la nuit (Prix du premier roman)
- 1987: Un amateur en sentiments
- 1989 : Le cabinet à éclipses
- 1990: Le discours des absents
- 1995 Le conseil d’indiscipline
- 1997: L’homme du cinquième jour (Prix Renaudot des lycéens)
- 1999 : Histoire de l’homme que sa femme vient de quitter
- 2017: Vous écrivez ?

==== With other editors ====
- 1994: La lettre italienne (Belfond)
- 1989: L’Afrique intérieure (Arléa)
- 1998: Les jours d’avant (Belfond)
- 2003: Être heureux (Arléa)
- 2006: Ferreira revient (Belfond)

=== Youth ===
==== Enquête au collège series ====
Illustrations by Serge Bloch, with Gallimard Jeunesse

- 1989 : Le professeur a disparu
- 1991 : Enquête au collège
- 1993 : P.P.Cul-Vert détective privé
- 1995 : Sur la piste de la salamandre
- 1998 : Le mystère du Loch Ness
- 2000 : Le Club des inventeurs
- 2012 : Sa majesté P.P. 1^{er}
- 2013 : Le professeur a disparu

Histoires des Jean-Quelque-chose series

- 2000 : L'Omelette au sucre
- 2003 : Le Camembert volant
- 2007 : La Soupe de poissons rouges
- 2009 : Des vacances en chocolat
- 2013 : La Cerise sur le gâteau
- 2016 : Une belle brochette de bananes
- 2018: Un petit pois pour six

==== Other novels ====
With Gallimard Jeunesse

- Le Collège fantôme, éd. Gallimard Jeunesse, (ISBN 207059467X)
- Bon Anniversaire, éd. Gallimard Jeunesse, (ISBN 9782070551750)
- L'invité des CE2, éd. Gallimard Jeunesse
- Agence Pertinax, éd. Gallimard Jeunesse
- Magnus Million et le dortoir des cauchemars, éd. Gallimard Jeunesse, (ISBN 9782070638901)
- Mimsy Pocket et les enfants sans nom, éd. Gallimard Jeunesse

With other editors

- Léo des villes, Léo des champs (Thierry Magnier)
- Le livre dont je ne suis pas le héros (L'École des loisirs)

Picture books

- Rita et Machin series, illustrated by Olivier Tallec
- Louise Titi, illustrated by Soledad
- Le prince Sauvage et la renarde, illustrated by Jean-Claude Götting

=== Theatre ===
- 2000 : Femmes
- 2004 : Compartiment séducteur, staging by Jean-Pierre Bouvier, at the Théâtre du Palais-Royal in Paris
