= Marien Defalvard =

French novelist

- Born: Marien Defalvard; 20 February 1992 (age 34); Paris, France
- Occupation: French novelist
- Years active: 2007–present
- Known for: The Paris Literary Prize, Prix de Flore and the Prix du Premier Roman prize from France
- Notable work: Narthex: poems, Paris

Marien Defalvard (born 20 February 1992 in Paris) is a French novelist. From 2007 to 2008, he wrote his first novel. In 2011, he received the French literary prize, Prix de Flore and the Prix du Premier Roman prize from France.

== Biography ==
=== Origins and training ===
The son of an economist, Marien Defalvard was born on 20 February 1992 in the 14th arrondissement of Paris.

He spent his childhood in Orléans, and attended school at Saint-Charles College (2001–2005), and then at Jean-Zay High School (2005–2008).

He graduated at the age of 16 in 2008, before starting his first term at Pothier5 and Louis-le-Grand high schools.

== Literary career ==
Marien Defalvar began writing his first novel in 2007, after having produced some youth texts.

His first novel, ‘Du temps qu’on existait’ (The time when we existed) appeared in 2011; it is distinguished by the style of its author, which surprises with respect to his youth. The reception of the novel is more divided. While Jérôme Garcin discovers "a sumptuous and well-mannered prose", Jérôme Dupuis calls it an "indigestible tome".

In spite of these contrasting reactions, ‘Du temps qu’on existait’ caught the attention of the critics on the occasion of the literary re-entry 2011 alongside the French art of the war of Alexis Jenni: the novel received the prices of Flore and the first novel, and appears in the first selection of Renaudot and December.

After the publication of this first novel, Marien Defalvard abandoned writing and only returned to it in 2014–15.

In 2016, he published a first collection of poems, Narthex.

== Works ==
- Du temps qu’on existait: novel, Paris, Grasset, 2011 (reprinted 2012), 372 p. (ISBN 978-2-246-78738-9).
- Narthex: poems, Paris, Exils, coll. "Literature", 2016, 235 p. (ISBN 978-2-912-96975-0).
