= Yasmina Traboulsi =

French writer (born 1975)

Yasmina Traboulsi (born 1975) is a French writer. She is the daughter of the Lebanese art collector Samir Traboulsi. She studied law at Panthéon-Assas University and worked in London as a lawyer. She is best known for her 2003 novel Les enfants de la Place which won the Prix du Premier Roman. It was translated into English by Polly McLean under the title Bahia Blues and was nominated for the Independent Foreign Fiction Prize. Her second novel was called Amers (2007).
