= Máxima (magazine) =

Monthly women's magazine in Portugal

- Editor-in-chief: Rosário Mello e Castro
- Categories: Women's fashion magazine; Women's magazine
- Frequency: Monthly
- Publisher: Cofina Media
- Founded: 1988
- First issue: October 1988
- Final issue: June 2020
- Company: Cofina
- Country: Portugal
- Based in: Lisbon
- Language: Portuguese
- Website: Maxima

Máxima was a monthly women's fashion magazine published in Lisbon, Portugal, which was the Portuguese version of the French women's magazine Madame Figaro. The magazine was in circulation between 1988 and 2020, dedicating now it's time between the online website, an annual magazine and a tv program.

== History and profile ==
Máxima started in 1988 as a Portuguese version of Madame Figaro, being the first international edition of the magazine. The first issue was published in October 1988. The founding publisher was Edirevistas Sociedade Editorial S.A. The magazine is owned by Cofina and is published by Cofina Media on a monthly basis. Its headquarters is in Lisbon.

As of 2015 Sofia Lucas was the editor-in-chief of Máxima. The magazine publishes a list of Women of the Year. The major topics for the monthly are fashion and beauty, but it also covers all women-related news. In March 2015 the magazine organized an exhibition, 100 Homens Sem Prenceitos: Um Passo Pela Igualidade (Portuguese: 100 Men without Prejudices: A Step for Equality), to mark International Women's Day. In the event leading Portuguese men from different fields, including Simão Morgado, Ruben Alves and Tomás Barroso, were photographed wearing women's shoes to increase awareness about women's rights and to financially support for breast cancer research. The photos were exhibited at Lisbon's Centro Cultural de Belém.

Máxima ceased publication in June 2020 due to low circulation figures.

== Circulation ==
In 1995 Máxima was the fifth best-selling women's magazine in Portugal with a circulation of 49,000 copies. The magazine sold 59,000 copies in 2007. The monthly had a circulation of 57,397 copies in 2010 and 52,618 copies in 2011. Máxima sold 45,787 copies in 2012. Its 2019 circulation was 20,866 copies.

== See also ==
- List of magazines in Portugal
