= Nicolas Rey =

French writer

Nicolas Rey is a French writer born in Evreux, Eure, on 8 May 1973.

== History ==
In 2000, Rey received the "Prix de Flore", a French literary prize awarded to youthful authors, for his novel Mémoire Courte. Following his start on the French television show "Cuisine et Dépendance", Rey became a daily reviewer on the French television network Canal Plus show "En Aparté". Next, on the same channel, he co-hosted a show reviewing recent happenings called "Un Café et l'Addition". His literature column, "Entre les Lignes", appears in the French magazine VSD.

== Bibliography ==
1998 : Treize minutes, Au Diable Vauvert

2000 : Mémoire courte, Au Diable Vauvert

2003 : Un début prometteur, Au Diable Vauvert

2004 : Courir à trente ans, Au Diable Vauvert

2006 : Vallauris Plage, Grasset

== Awards ==
- 2000 : Prix de Flore (Mémoire courte, Au Diable Vauvert)
- 2018 : Prix Gatsby (Dos au mur) - awarded by the Francis Scott Fitzgerald Academy at the Hôtel Belles Rives
