= Hôtel Belles Rives =

Belles Rives
- Hôtel Belles Rives and terrace, view from the beach, in the month of December 2019.
- Former names: Villa Saint-Louis

General information
- Architectural style: Art Deco
- Location: 33 Boulevard Edouard Baudoin, Juan-les-Pins, France
- Coordinates: 43.5649°N 7.11555°E
- Owner: Marianne Estène-Chauvin (Groupe Belles Rives)
- Affiliation: Prix Fitzgerald (literary prize) & the Francis Scott Fitzgerald Academy; Prix Gatsby (est. 2018) & Prix Zelda (est. 2021)

Design and construction
- Known for: Where Francis Scott Fitzgerald wrote Tender is the Night

Other information
- Number of rooms: 43

Website
- https://www.bellesrives.com

The Hôtel Belles Rives is a hotel located in Juan-les-Pins, a town in the Antibes region on the French Riviera. It is known for being the place where Francis Scott and Zelda Fitzgerald spent time with friends Gerald and Sara Murphy (and others famously part of the Lost Generation) in the Roaring Twenties. This is where F. Scott Fitzgerald began writing Tender is the Night.

== History ==
The hotel was originally a villa known as the Villa Saint-Louis. Thus is how it was known when the Fitzgeralds, the Murphys, and others like Ernest Hemingway spent time there.

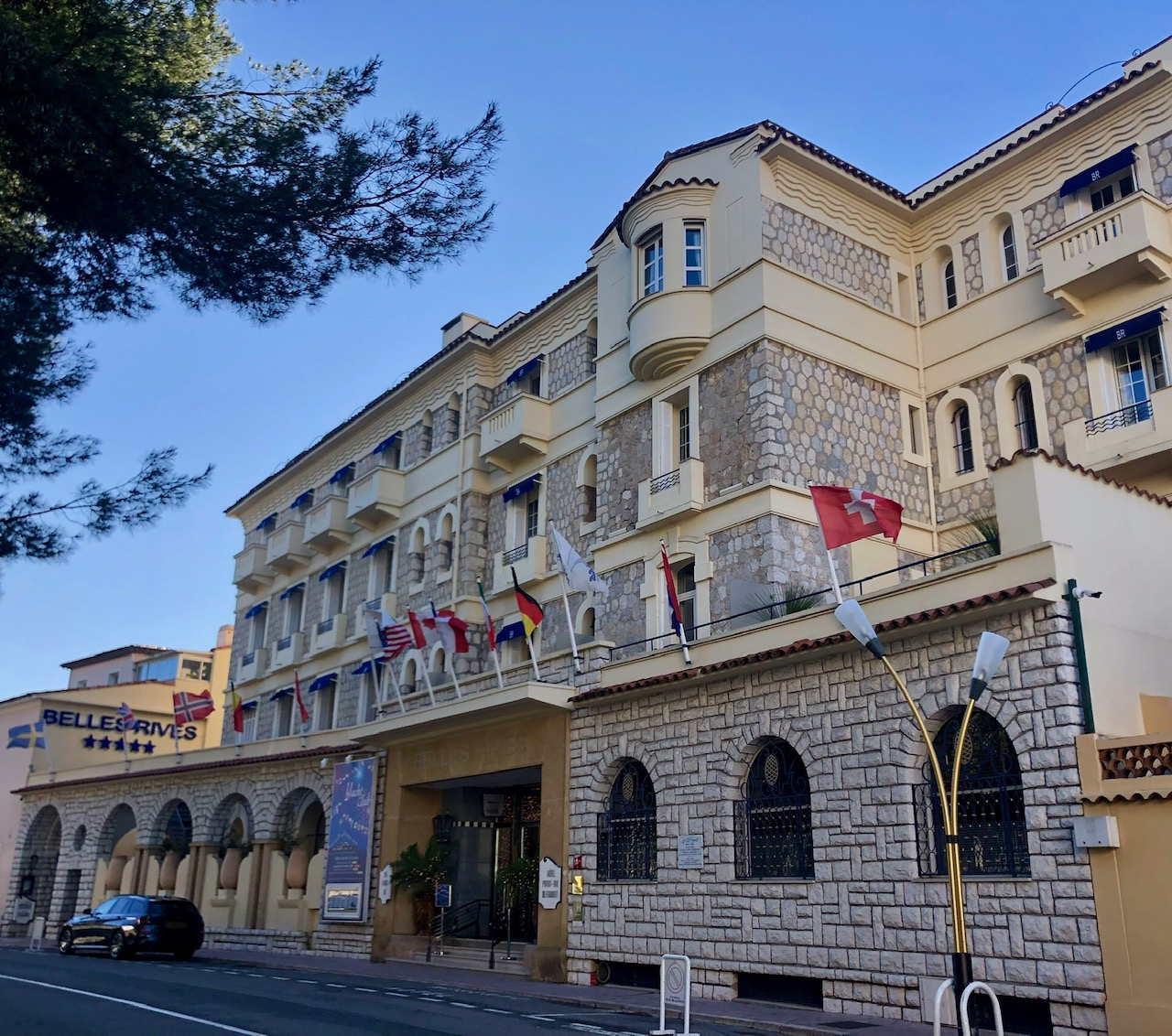
View of Belles Rives from the road

In 1929, Boma Estène and his wife Simone acquired the Villa Saint-Louis and transformed it into a hotel. The Hôtel Belles Rives officially opened its doors in 1930, capturing the essence of the era with its Art Deco style. The hotel is owned through the Groupe Belles Rives established by the family of current owner Marianne Estène-Chauvin, the granddaughter of Boma and Simone Estène.

== Prix Fitzgerald ==
The Prix Fitzgerald was created in 2011 by Estène-Chauvin, the President of the Francis Scott Fitzgerald Academy whose family owned the Belles Rives since the 1930s. It is given to a writer of a book in the French language or translated into French from English. The author receives a check for €5,000. The winner also spends the night in Scott Fitzgerald's old room. The Francis Scott Fitzgerald Academy, presided over by Estène-Chauvin, presents the award annually since 2011; in 2018, the Prix Gatsby was inaugurated, then the Prix Zelda was added in 2021, both decided by the same jury and presented in the same event. The prize reached its 15th year in June 2026, a milestone marked by the ceremony at the hotel for the presentation of the award to the year's winner, Julian Barnes.

=== The Jury ===
The winner is chosen by a jury that includes:

- Bertrand de Saint Vincent, Deputy Editor-in-Chief of Le Figaro and president of the jury
- Daphné Roulier (journaliste)
- Marie-Dominique Lelièvre (journalist, novelist, biographer)
- Éric Neuhoff (novelist & journalist elected to the Académie française in 2025)
- François Armanet (editor-in-chief, L'Obs)
- Frédéric Beigbeder (journalist, literary critic, television presenter)
- Christophe Ono-dit-Biot (journalist and novelist)
- Hélène Fillières (film director & actor)

=== Laureates, Prix Fitzgerald ===
- Julian Barnes (2026) for Departure(s)
- Richard Ford (2025) for Be Mine (A Fool's Paradise)
- Joyce Carol Oates (2024) for 48 Clues into the Disappearance of My Sister
- Quentin Tarantino (2023) for Cinema Speculation
- Nick Hornby (2022) for Just Like You
- Gianfranco Calligarich (2021) for Last Summer in the City
- William Boyd (2019) for Love is Blind
- Christopher Bollen (2018) for Beau Ravage
- Jay McInerney (2017) for Bright, Precious Days
- Julia Pierpont (2016) for Among the Ten Thousand Things
- Robert Goolrick (2015) for The Fall of Princes
- Whit Stillman (2014) for The Last Days of Disco
- Jeffrey Eugenides (2013) for The Marriage Plot
- Amor Towles (2012) for Rules of Civility
- Jonathan Dee (2011) for The Privileges

=== Laureates, Prix Gatsby ===
- Thadée Klossowski de Rola (2022) for Dreamed Life
- Nicolas Rey (2018)

=== Laureates, Prix Zelda ===
- Dominique Bona (2021) for Divine Jacqueline
