= Paname Underground =

2017 novel by Johann Zarca

Paname Underground is a novel by French author Johann Zarca published on October 19, 2017, by Éditions Goutte d'Or. It received the Prix de Flore the same year, tied with Pierre Ducrozet's L'Invention des corps.

== Summary ==
The narrator of Paname Underground, a semi-fictionalized version of the author, is writing a guide to the Parisian underworld. When someone close to him is murdered, and he himself appears to be targeted as well, he must rely on his friends and acquaintances in Paris to survive and carry out his quest for vengeance. Along the way, he encounters and describes various aspects of the Parisian underworld: the drug scene, prostitution, squats, catacombs, etc.

== Style ==
The novel is written in a contemporary French that employs an immense amount of slang, much of it drawn from French hip-hop and banlieue culture.

== Critical reception ==
The novel was shortlisted for the Prix de Flore, which it won in November 2017, with six votes from the jury, alongside Pierre Ducrozet's L'invention des corps.

A documentary film based on the topics discussed in the book is in production.
