= One Thousand White Women =

Book by Jim Fergus

One Thousand White Women: The Journals of May Dodd (published by St. Martin's Press in 1998) is the first novel by journalist Jim Fergus. The novel is written as a series of journals chronicling the fictitious adventures of "J. Will Dodd's" ostensibly real ancestor in an imagined "Brides for Indians" program of the United States government.

An introduction by "J. Will Dodd" places the journals in a contemporary context, and lends an air of realism.

The book won the 1999 Fiction of the Year Award from the Mountains & Plains Booksellers Association. It has since sold over 250,000 copies in the United States, and its French translation was on the French bestseller list for 57 weeks and has sold over 400,000 copies in that country. Its sequel, published in 2017, is The Vengeance of Mothers.

== Plot ==
The premise of the story is that the Northern Cheyenne Indians are shrinking in numbers and seek a way to assimilate into white society. They decide to marry white women and have half-blood children, enabling the two cultures to blend naturally. The Cheyenne Chief Little Wolf approaches President Ulysses Grant with the proposal to trade 1000 white women for 1000 horses, an offer publicly refused by the government. However, the government sees the placating of the Indians as being to their benefit, so they begin the "Brides for Indians" program in which women who are physically healthy and of child rearing age may volunteer to go. However, in order to keep the plan unpublished, they offer the trip to women in prison, asylums, and other restrictive situations.

In Chicago, May Dodd was born into a wealthy family but she fell in love with a man who was "beneath" her, and bore his two children out of wedlock, so her family had her institutionalized in a mental asylum and had her children taken away. The "Brides for Indians" program sounded like a way out of the asylum, so she joined and started a life of adventure.

The story does meet with some non-fictional characters and situations, including Chief Little Wolf of the Northern Cheyenne tribe, description of many Cheyenne beliefs, and the military forced move to the reservations. Some other situations are adapted from real life, including Little Wolf's murder of a tribe member and exile.

== Reception ==
The book received a positive review from Kirkus Reviews, which stated: "An impressive historical, terse, convincing, and affecting." The book also met with criticism about its depiction of Native people and women, with one reviewer writing: "This is also a case of a truly badly written woman."
