= Robert Goolrick =

American writer (1948–2022)

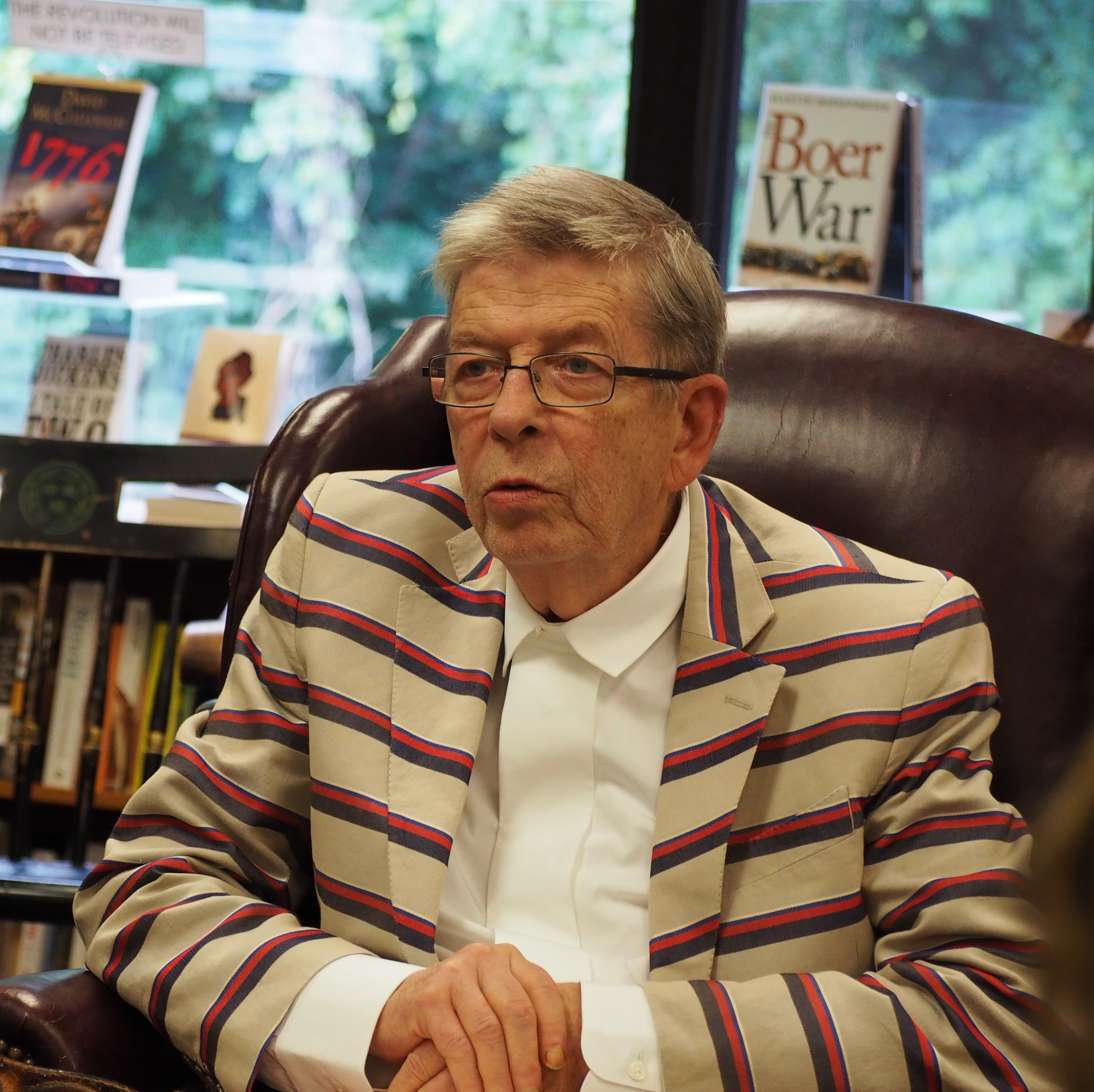
- Goolrick in Washington, D.C.
- Born: Robert Cooke Goolrick; August 4, 1948; Charlottesville, Virginia, U.S.
- Died: April 29, 2022 (aged 73); Lynchburg, Virginia, U.S.
- Writing career
- Genres: novels, memoir

Robert Cooke Goolrick (August 4, 1948 – April 29, 2022) was an American writer whose first novel sold more than five million copies.

== Biography ==
Robert Goolrick grew up in the 1950s in the small college town of Lexington, Virginia. His mother was a homemaker and his father a college professor, and he had two siblings. He graduated from Johns Hopkins University. When Goolrick lost his job as an advertising creative director and copywriter, he turned to memoir writing. The End of the World As We Know It: Scenes from a Life highlighted "the excesses and failures of both the social underpinnings of the time and his parents' inevitable alcohol-fueled decline, culminating in a devastating portrayal of the sexual abuse he suffered as a child." He sought "something resembling peace" in his writing. After years living in New York City, Goolrick returned to Virginia. In 2015, he moved from Whitestone, Virginia, to Weems, Virginia. He reads from his book A Reliable Wife in a video posted for his Facebook followers to which he added, "For people who can't come to a bookstore, this is what I look like and what I sound like, thanks to my friend Ashraf Meer."

Robert Goolrick's books were also widely acclaimed abroad, notably in France, where he made a brilliant career and was loved both by the press and the readers. He was awarded several prestigious literary prizes there, among which the Prix Fitzgerald (for La chute des princes) and the Grand Prix des Lectrices de Elle (for Arrive un vagabond).

He died from complications related to COVID-19 in April 2022, during the COVID-19 pandemic in Virginia. Goolrick is buried in Old Chapel Cemetery in Millwood, Virginia, along with his ancestor, writer John Esten Cooke (1830–1886).

== Works ==
- 2007: The End of the World as We Know It: Scenes from a Life, Algonquin Books, ISBN 978-1565124813
- 2009: A Reliable Wife, Algonquin Books, ISBN 978-1565125964
- 2012: Heading Out to Wonderful, Algonquin Books, ISBN 978-1565129238
- 2015: The Fall of Princes, Algonquin Books, ISBN 978-1616204204
- 2018: The Dying of the Light, Harper, ISBN 978-0062678225

== Works translated into French ==
- 2009: Une femme simple et honnête, [« A Reliable Wife »], translation by Marie de Prémonville, Paris, Éditions Anne Carrière, 413 p. ISBN 978-2-84337-542-2
- 2010: Féroces, [« The End of the World as We Know It: Scenes from a Life »], translated by Marie de Prémonville, Éditions Anne Carrière, 254 p. ISBN 978-2-8433-7579-8.
- 2012: Arrive un vagabond, [« Heading Out to Wonderful »], translation by Marie de Prémonville, Éditions Anne Carrière, 319 p. ISBN 978-2-84337-681-8

- Prix Laurent-Bonelli Virgin-Lire 2012
- Grand prix des lectrices de Elle 2013.

- 2014: La Chute des princes [« The Fall of Princes »], translation by Marie de Prémonville, Éditions Anne Carrière, 360 p. ISBN 978-2-8433-7737-2.
- 2017: Après l’incendie, followed by the short story Trois lamentations, translation by Marie de Prémonville, Éditions Anne Carrière, 300 p. ISBN 978-2-84337-828-7
- 2019: Ainsi passe la gloire du monde, translation by Marie de Prémonville, Éditions Anne Carrière, 191 p. ISBN 978-2-84337-961-1

== Prizes ==
- 2013: Grand prix des lectrices de Elle for Arrive un vagabond (Heading Out to Wonderful)
- 2015: Prix Fitzgerald for La Chute des princes (The Fall of Princes)
