= Jim Fergus =

American author

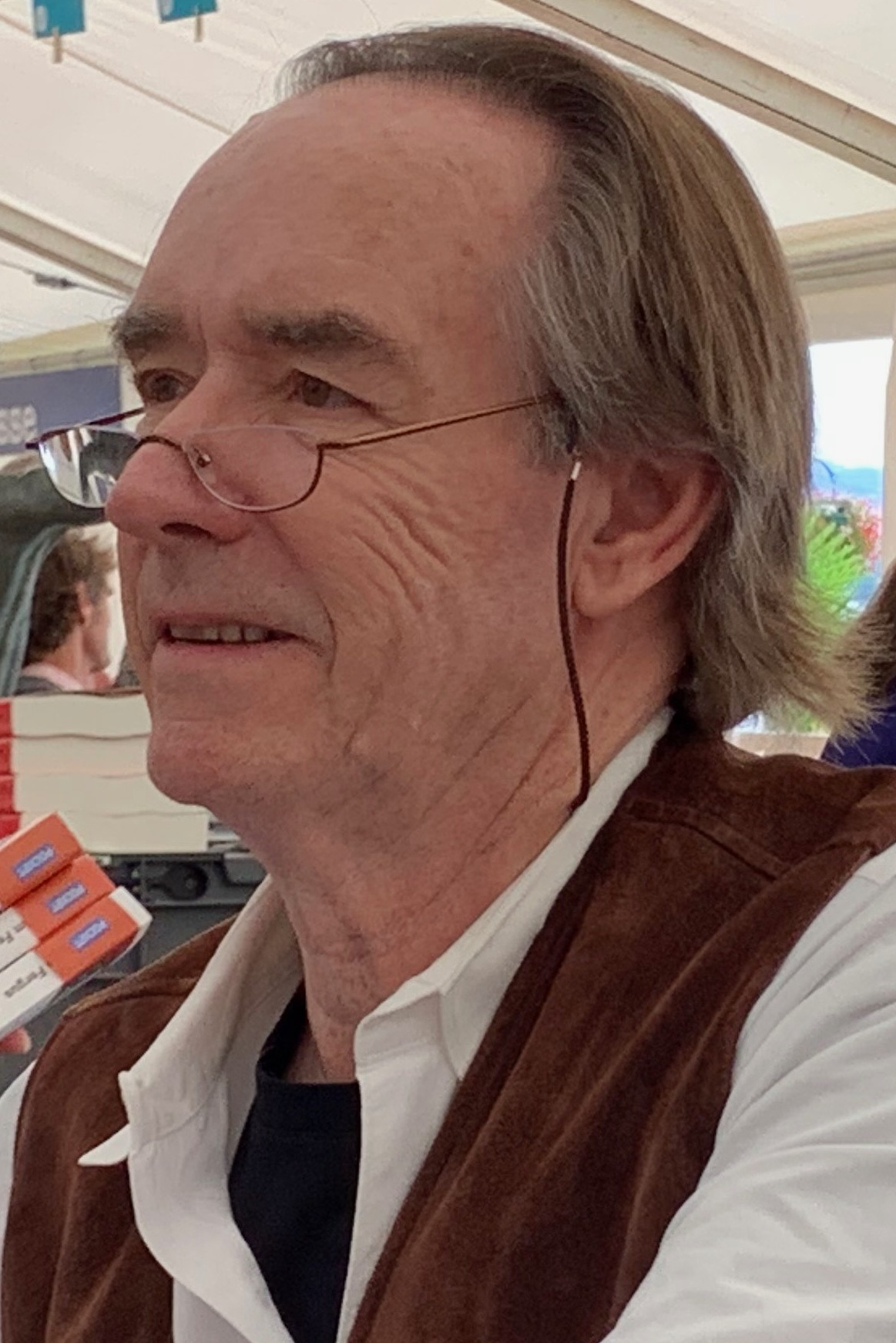
Jim Fergus

Jim Fergus (born 1950) is an American author. He has a degree in English from Colorado College and has worked as a tennis teacher and full-time freelance writer. His first novel was One Thousand White Women: The Journals of May Dodd, which won the 1999 Fiction of the Year Award from the Mountains & Plains Booksellers Association and sold over one million copies in the United States. The French translation was on the French bestseller list for 57 weeks and has sold over 400,000 copies in that country.

== Works ==
- One Thousand White Women: The Journals of May Dodd (St. Martin's Griffin, 1999) ISBN 0-312-19943-0
- The Sporting Road: Travels Across America in an Airstream Trailer- With Fly Rod, Shotgun, and a Yellow Lab Named Sweetzer (St. Martin's Griffin, 2000) ISBN 0-312-24245-X
- The Wild Girl: The Notebooks of Ned Giles (Hyperion, 2005) ISBN 1-401-300545
- The Vengeance of Mothers: The Journals of Margaret Kelly & Molly McGill (St. Martin's Press, 2017) ISBN 9781250093424
- A Hunter's Road (Henry Holt and Company, 1992) ISBN 0 8050-1619-8
