= Marie-Dominique Lelièvre =

French writer and journalist

Marie-Dominique Lelièvre is a French writer and journalist.

She is the author of novels and biographies. As a journalist, she collaborates with Marianne — and previously with L’Événement du jeudi —, L'Express, and Libération where she writes portraits.

She is on the jury of the Prix Fitzgerald, a literary prize in the French Riviera where Francis Scott Fitzgerald wrote Tender is the Night.

== Bibliography ==
- 1994: Gainsbourg sans filtre, Flammarion, 231 p. ISBN 2-08-066678-9
- 1999: Martine fait du sentiment, novel, Arles, Actes Sud, series "Domaine français", 132 p. ISBN 2-7427-2370-6
- 2006: Je vais de mieux en mieux, rnovel, Flammarion, 202 p. ISBN 978-2080689573
- 2007: Portraits pleine page : 13 ans de libre enquête, J'ai lu, 186 p. ISBN 978-2290004883
- 2008: Sagan à toute allure, Éditions Denoël, 343 p. ISBN 978-2207256947

2008: - Grand prix de l'héroïne Madame Figaro

- 2010: Marie-Dominique Lelièvre. Saint Laurent mauvais garçon (in French). Flammarion. ISBN 978-2081239111.
- 2012: Brigitte Bardot : Plein la vue, Flammarion, 352 p. ISBN 978-2081246249
- 2013: Chanel & Co. Les Amies de Coco, Éditions Denoël, 320 p. ISBN 978-2-207-11065-2
