= Dominique Bona =

French writer (born 1953)

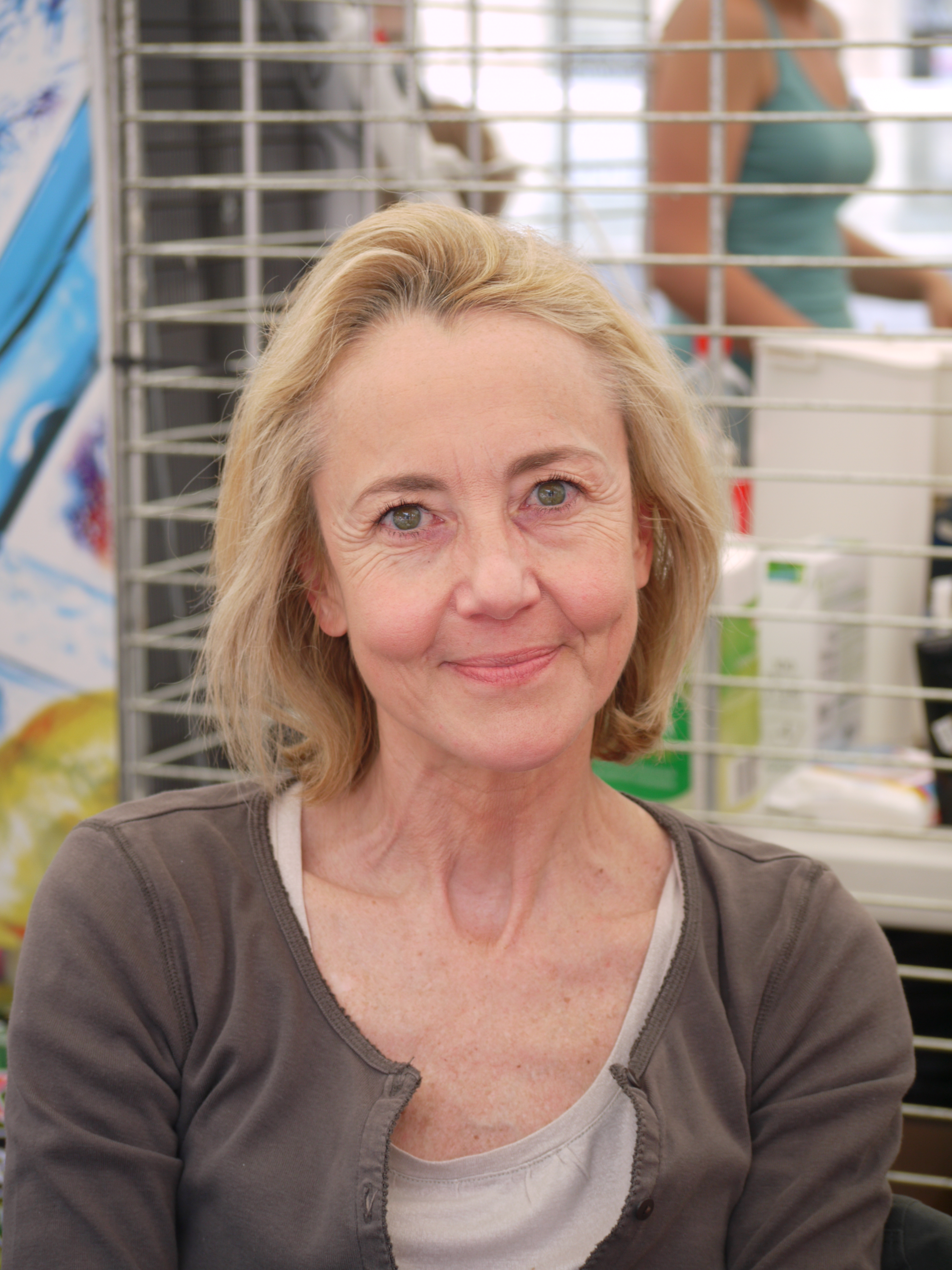
- Bona in 2010
- Born: Dominique Conte; 29 July 1953 (age 73); Perpignan, France
- Education: Lycée Victor-Duruy; Paris-Sorbonne University
- Occupation: Writer
- Known for: Member of the Académie Française

Dominique Bona (born 29 July 1953) is a French writer.

== Life ==
She won the 2000 Bourse Goncourt for biography, and 1998 Prix Renaudot. She was the literary critic for Le Figaro and Le Journal du dimanche.

She was elected a member of Académie Française in April 2013.

In 2022, her novel Divine Jacqueline won the Prix Zelda awarded by the Francis Scott Fitzgerald Academy. The presentation was held at the Hôtel Belles Rives in the French Riviera.

She is the daughter of Arthur Conte and Colette Lacassagne.
