= Victor Cohen Hadria =

French writer (born 1949)

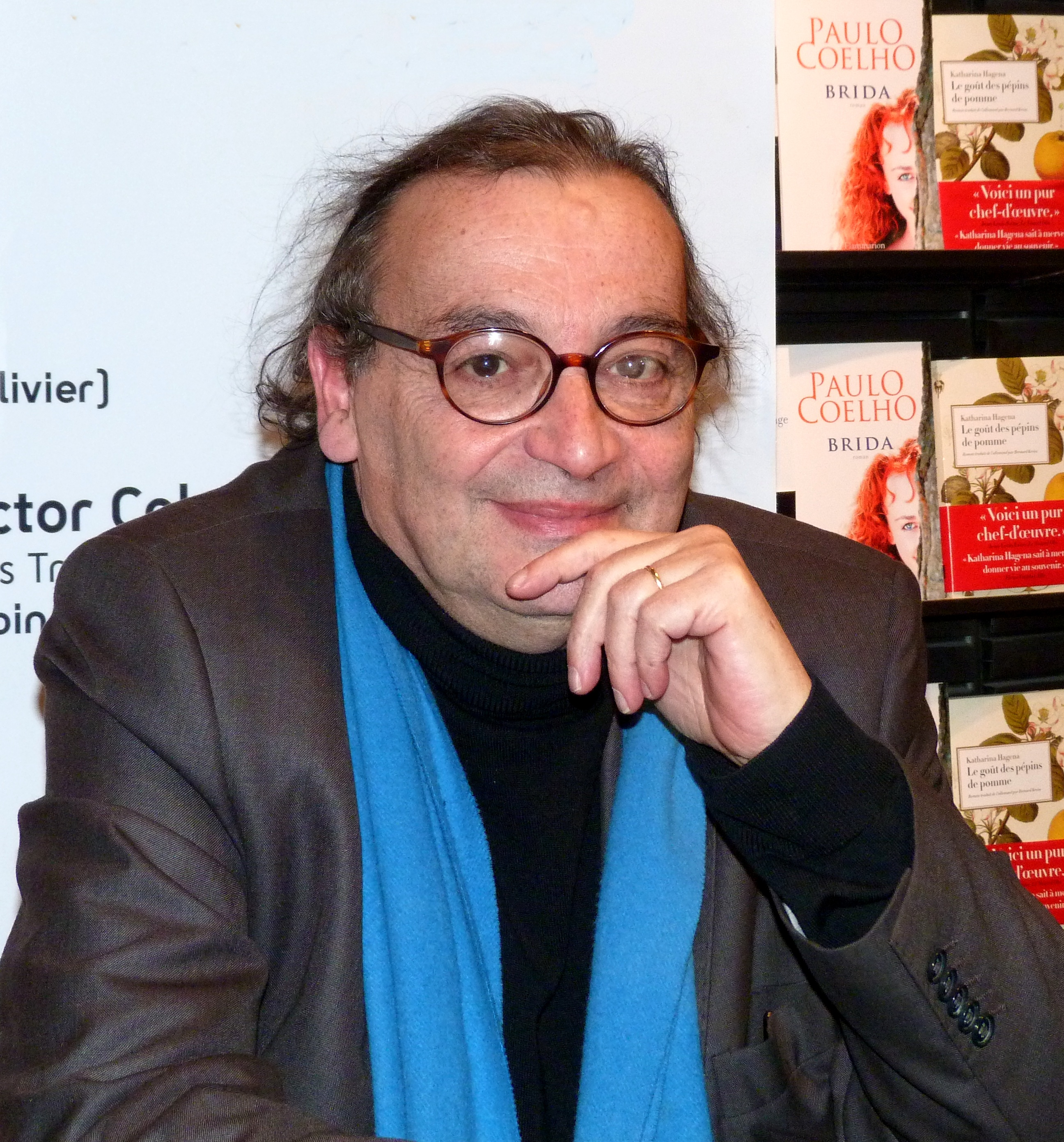
Victor Cohen-Hadria in 2010

Victor Cohen Hadria (born 1949) is a French writer.

== Biography ==
Victor Cohen Hadria was the director of the medical broadcasts of Igor Barrère and various fictions for television. He was also a winegrower and oenologist for six years in a property of Doganella de Ninfa in Lazio, Italy. In Les Trois saisons de la rage that gives voice to a Norman physician of the nineteenth century "he brilliantly built, in a language of pure classicism, a great fresco of the rural society of the XIXth."

== Works ==
- 1997: Isaac était leur nom, short stories, Albin Michel, ISBN 9782226092670
- 1998: Chronique des quatre horizons, short stories, Albin Michel, ISBN 9782226105134
- 2010 Les Trois Saisons de la rage, novel, Albin Michel, ISBN 2226215158
- 2017: Maîtres du monde, novel, Albin Michel, - ISBN 9782226393296

== Prizes ==
- 1997: Prix de la nouvelle du Salon du livre du Le Mans
- 2010: Prix du premier roman for Les Trois Saisons de la rage.
- 2011: Prix des libraires for Les Trois Saisons de la rage.
- 2011: Prix littéraire de la ville de Caen for Les Trois Saisons de la Rage
