= Monica Sabolo =

French writer and journalist

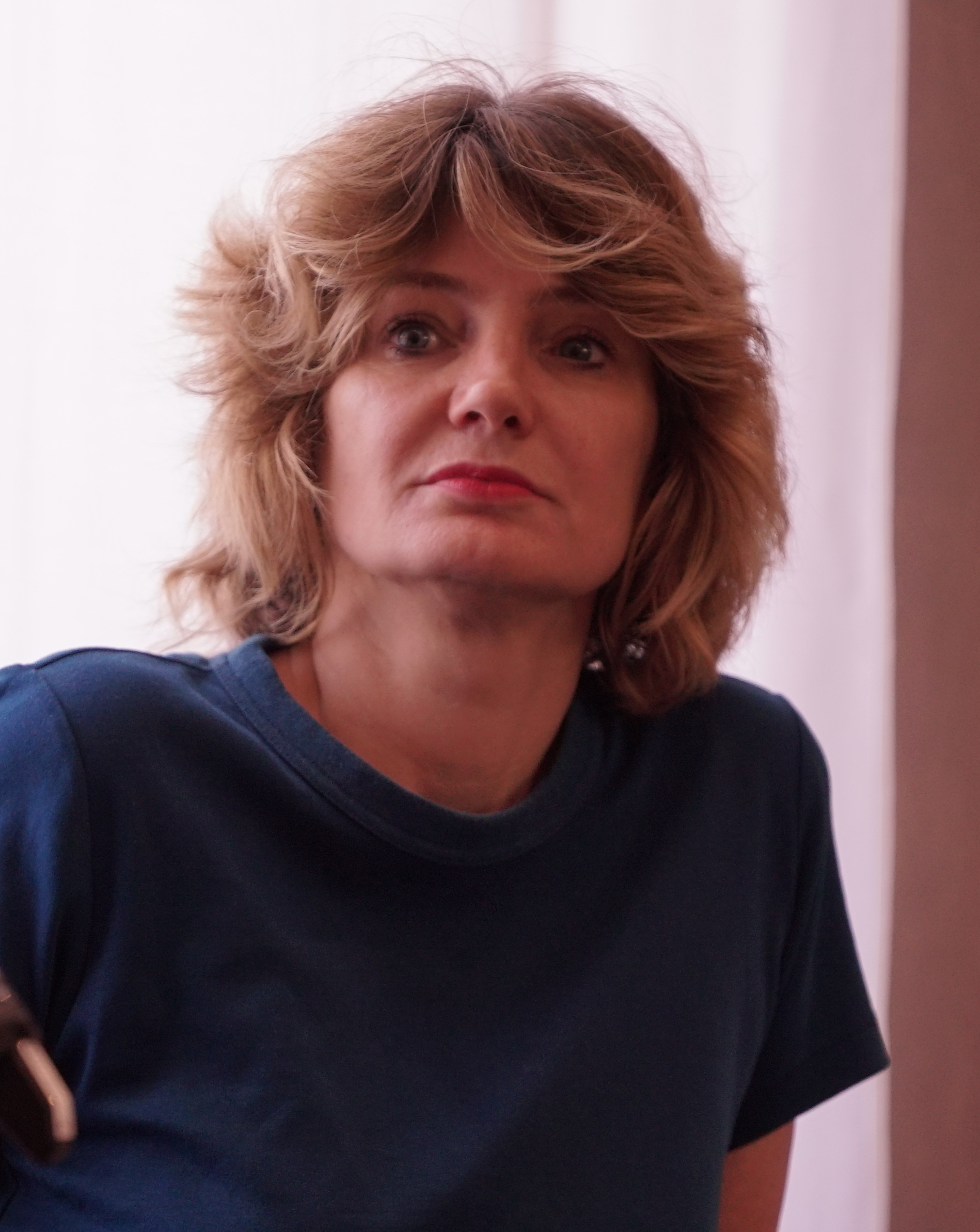

Monica Sabolo (born 27 July 1971 in Milan) is a French writer and journalist.

== Biography ==
Sabolo grew up in Geneva and now lives in Paris. As a journalist, she was editor of Grazia. Her book Tout cela n'a rien à voir avec moi won the Prix de Flore in 2013. Published in 2022, La vie clandestine combines an exploration of the militant group Action Directe with a personal history from her childhood and was long-listed for the Prix Goncourt and the Prix Renaudot.

== Books ==
- Le Roman de Lili, éditions Jean-Claude Lattès, 2000, 188 p. ISBN 2-7096-2161-4
- Jungle, éditions JC Lattès, 2005, 299 p. ISBN 2-7096-2260-2
- Tout cela n'a rien à voir avec moi, éditions JC Lattès, 2013, 153 p. ISBN 978-2-7096-4465-5
- Crans-Montana, éditions JC Lattès, 2015, 240 p. ISBN 978-2-7096-5045-8
- Summer, éditions JC Lattès, 2017, 320 p. ISBN 978-2-7096-5982-6
- Éden, éditions Gallimard, 2019, 288 p. ISBN 978-2-0728-6315-8
- La Vie clandestine, Gallimard, 2022, 336 p. ISBN 9782072900426
