= Bruce Benderson =

American author (born 1946)

Bruce Benderson (born August 6, 1946) is an American author, born to parents of Russian Jewish descent, who lives in New York. He attended William Nottingham High School (1964) in Syracuse, New York and then Binghamton University (1969). He is today a novelist, essayist, journalist and translator, widely published in France, less so in the United States.

In 2004, Benderson's lengthy erotic memoir Autobiographie érotique, about a nine-month sojourn in Romania, won the prestigious French literary prize Prix de Flore. The book was published in the United States (Tarcher/Penguin) and the United Kingdom (Snow Books) in 2006 under the title The Romanian: Story of an Obsession.

== Career ==
Benderson's book-length essay, Toward the New Degeneracy (1997), looks at New York's Times Square, where rich and poor once mixed in a lively atmosphere of drugs, sex, and commerce. Benderson argues that this kind of mingling of classes has been the source of many modern avant-garde movements, and he laments the disappearance of that particular milieu. His novel User (1994) is a lyrical descent into the world of junkies and male hustlers. He is also the author of James Bidgood (Taschen, 1999), about the maker of the cult film Pink Narcissus.

A book-length essay by Benderson, Sexe et Solitude, about the extinction of urban space and the rise of the Internet, was published in French in 1999. A collection of his essays, published under the title Attitudes, appeared in French in 2006. These essays, along with 'Sexe et Solitude' and 'Toward the New Degeneracy,' were printed in America in a nonfiction anthology of Benderson's writings entitled Sex and Isolation (University of Wisconsin Press, 2007), which was cited as one of the 10 best university press books of the year by the magazine Foreword. The year 2007 also saw the publication in French (Editions Payot & Rivages) of a new novel by Benderson called "Pacific Agony," a caustic satire of life in America's Pacific Northwest, as well as Benderson's personal illustrated encyclopedia of the 60s and 70s, Concentré de contreculture (Editions Scali), published in French only. The novel Pacific Agony was published in English by Semiotext(e)/MIT Press in fall 2009. In 2014, Semiotext(e))/MIT Press also published Benderson's controversial 60-page essay, Against Marriage, as part of a collection exhibited at the 2014 Whitney Museum Biennial. A French edition of the book has been planned.

Benderson's shorter literary efforts have been published in Between C & D, 3:AM Magazine, American Letters and Commentary, Men on Men and Flesh and the Word.

As a journalist, he has written on squatters for the New York Times Magazine, boxing for the Village Voice, unusual shelters for nest, the art of translation for The Wall Street Journal, and film, books, and culture for various other publications, including "Paris Vogue," "Vogue Hommes," French "GQ," "Libération," Out, The Stranger, New York Press, BlackBook magazine, and Paper. He has translated numerous books of French origin, including Virginie Despentes' novel Baise Moi (which was later adapted into a controversial film); the writers Robbe-Grillet, Pierre Guyotat, Sollers, Benoît Duteurtre, Grégoire Bouillier, Philippe Djian, Martin Page and Nelly Arcan; and, though it is quite far away from his usual subject matter, the autobiography of Céline Dion. In 2007, his translation of Tony Duvert's Le bon sexe illustré (Good Sex Illustrated) was published by Semiotext(e)/MIT Press. A second book by Duvert he has translated, entitled Diary of An Innocent, was released by the same publisher in 2009. His translation of David Foenkinos's novel, Delicacy, was released in December 2011 by Harper Perennial. In 2014, Benderson began working on the translation of a 1,000-page biography of the filmmaker Jean Renoir by Pascal Mérigeau.

Benderson is the literary executor of the deceased novelist, Ursule Molinaro. He is mentioned in Frédéric Beigbeder's most recent book, Windows on the World. In 2006, he became a publishing associate at Virgin Books USA and later worked developing projects and editing proposals for the literary agent David Vigliano. He has taught at the maverick ranch college, Deep Springs, on three separate occasions. From 2008 to 2013, he wrote a monthly column, in French, for the magazine, Têtu. For his French publisher he completed a book about the future interfacing of biology and technology and the notion of The Singularity, as developed by Ray Kurzweil. The book is called Transhumain and was published by Editions Payot & Rivages in late October 2010.

In 2022, Benderson's long-awaited collection of complete short stories, Urban Gothic, was published by ITNA Press.

== See also ==
- LGBT culture in New York City
- List of LGBT people from New York City
- NYC Pride March
