= Saint-Parres-lès-Vaudes =

Commune in Grand Est, France

- Commune
- Coat of arms
- Location of Saint-Parres-lès-Vaudes
- Location within France Location within Grand Est
- Coordinates: 48°10′19″N 4°12′59″E
- Country: France
- Region: Grand Est
- Department: Aube
- Arrondissement: Troyes
- Canton: Bar-sur-Seine

Government
  - Mayor (2020–2026): Bernard de La Hamayde
- Area^{1}: 3.08 km^{2} (1.19 sq mi)
- Elevation: 131 m (430 ft)
- Population (2023): 1,084
  - Density: 352/km^{2} (912/sq mi)
- Time zone: UTC+01:00 (CET)
  - Summer (DST): UTC+02:00 (CEST)
- INSEE/Postal code: 10358 /10260
- ^{1} French Land Register data, which excludes lakes, ponds, glaciers > 1 km^{2} (0.386 sq mi or 247 acres) and river estuaries.

Saint-Parres-lès-Vaudes (French pronunciation: [sɛ̃ paʁ lɛ vod], literally Saint-Parres near Vaudes) is a commune in the Aube department in north-central France.

== Population ==
Historical population
Year	Pop.	±% p.a.
1968	726	—
1975	771	+0.86%
1982	977	+3.44%
1990	922	−0.72%
1999	960	+0.45%
2007	975	+0.19%
2012	1,047	+1.44%
2017	1,004	−0.84%
2023	1,084	+1.29%
Source: INSEE

== See also ==
- Communes of the Aube department
