= Poligny =

Poligny is the name of several communes in France:

- Poligny, Aube
- Poligny, Hautes-Alpes
- Poligny, Jura
- Poligny, Seine-et-Marne
