= Rumilly =

Rumilly may refer to several communes in France:

- Rumilly, Haute-Savoie
- Rumilly, Pas-de-Calais
- Rumilly-en-Cambrésis, Nord
- Rumilly-lès-Vaudes, Aube
