= Buxeuil =

Buxeuil is the name of several communes in France:

- Buxeuil, Aube
- Buxeuil, Indre
- Buxeuil, Vienne
