= Buxières-sur-Arce =

Commune in Grand Est, France

- Commune
- Location of Buxières-sur-Arce
- Location within France Location within Grand Est
- Coordinates: 48°07′33″N 4°27′31″E
- Country: France
- Region: Grand Est
- Department: Aube
- Arrondissement: Troyes
- Canton: Bar-sur-Seine

Government
  - Mayor (2020–2026): Paul Viardet
- Area^{1}: 10.43 km^{2} (4.03 sq mi)
- Elevation: 182 m (597 ft)
- Population (2023): 100
  - Density: 9.6/km^{2} (25/sq mi)
- Time zone: UTC+01:00 (CET)
  - Summer (DST): UTC+02:00 (CEST)
- INSEE/Postal code: 10069 /10110
- ^{1} French Land Register data, which excludes lakes, ponds, glaciers > 1 km^{2} (0.386 sq mi or 247 acres) and river estuaries.

Buxières-sur-Arce (French pronunciation: [byksjɛʁ syʁ aʁs]) is a commune in the Aube department in north-central France.

== Population ==
Historical population
Year	Pop.	±% p.a.
1968	136	—
1975	137	+0.10%
1982	138	+0.10%
1990	139	+0.09%
1999	149	+0.77%
2007	155	+0.49%
2012	140	−2.02%
2017	121	−2.87%
2023	100	−3.13%
Source: INSEE

== See also ==
- Communes of the Aube department
