= Villemoyenne =

Commune in Grand Est, France

- Commune
- Coat of arms
- Location of Villemoyenne
- Location within France Location within Grand Est
- Coordinates: 48°10′44″N 4°13′45″E
- Country: France
- Region: Grand Est
- Department: Aube
- Arrondissement: Troyes
- Canton: Bar-sur-Seine

Government
  - Mayor (2020–2026): Jean-Paul Girard
- Area^{1}: 12.21 km^{2} (4.71 sq mi)
- Elevation: 125 m (410 ft)
- Population (2023): 730
  - Density: 60/km^{2} (150/sq mi)
- Time zone: UTC+01:00 (CET)
  - Summer (DST): UTC+02:00 (CEST)
- INSEE/Postal code: 10419 /10260
- ^{1} French Land Register data, which excludes lakes, ponds, glaciers > 1 km^{2} (0.386 sq mi or 247 acres) and river estuaries.

Villemoyenne (French pronunciation: [vilmwajɛn]) is a commune in the Aube department in north-central France.

== Population ==
Historical population
Year	Pop.	±% p.a.
1968	461	—
1975	491	+0.90%
1982	505	+0.40%
1990	477	−0.71%
1999	523	+1.03%
2007	656	+2.87%
2012	755	+2.85%
2017	776	+0.55%
2023	730	−1.01%
Source: INSEE

== See also ==
- Communes of the Aube department
- Parc naturel régional de la Forêt d'Orient
