= Polisot =

Commune in Grand Est, France

- Commune
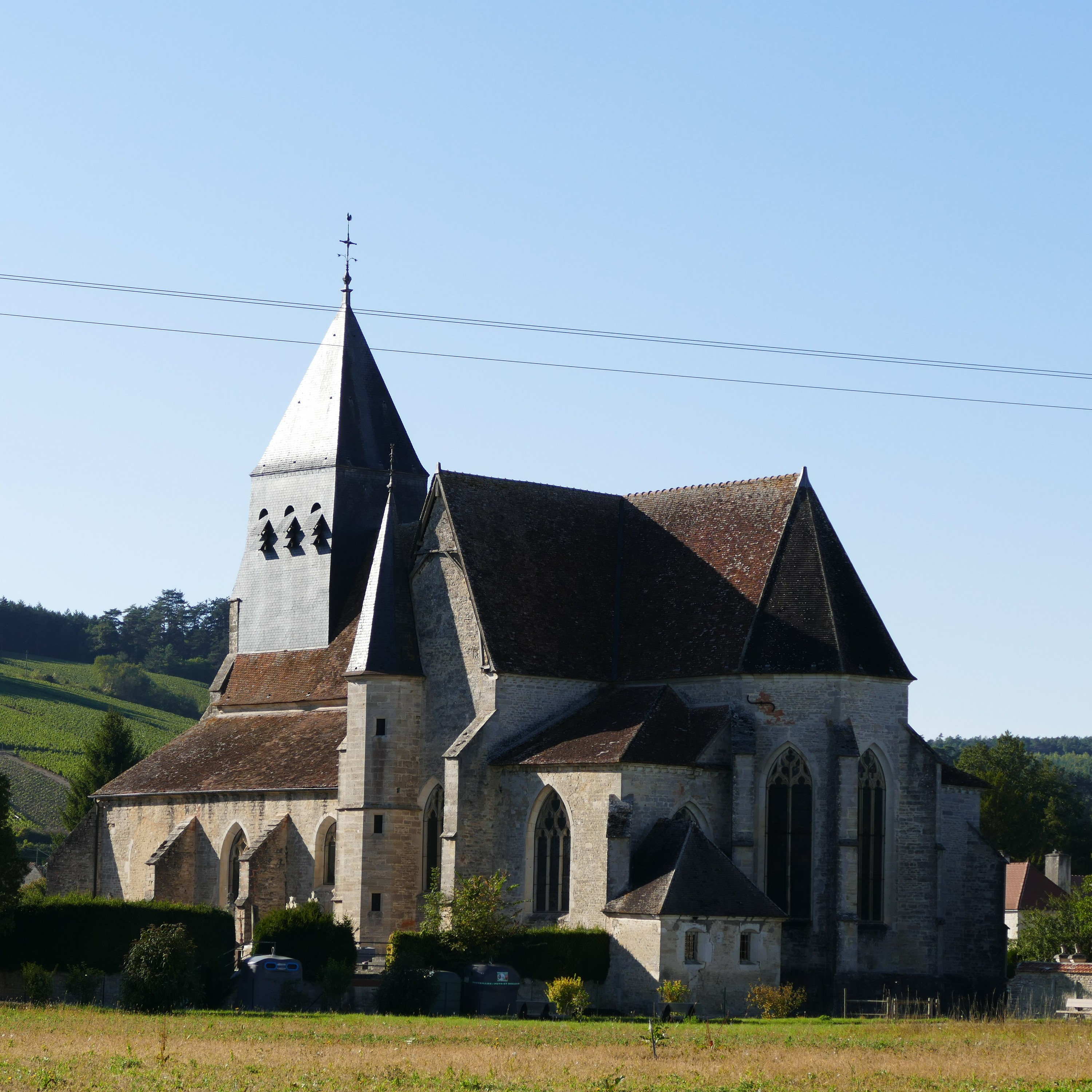
- The church in Polisot
- Location of Polisot
- Location within France Location within Grand Est
- Coordinates: 48°04′21″N 4°22′22″E
- Country: France
- Region: Grand Est
- Department: Aube
- Arrondissement: Troyes
- Canton: Bar-sur-Seine

Government
  - Mayor (2020–2026): Laurent Guilbaud
- Area^{1}: 10.52 km^{2} (4.06 sq mi)
- Elevation: 160 m (520 ft)
- Population (2023): 321
  - Density: 30.5/km^{2} (79.0/sq mi)
- Time zone: UTC+01:00 (CET)
  - Summer (DST): UTC+02:00 (CEST)
- INSEE/Postal code: 10295 /10110
- ^{1} French Land Register data, which excludes lakes, ponds, glaciers > 1 km^{2} (0.386 sq mi or 247 acres) and river estuaries.

Polisot (French pronunciation: [pɔlizo]) is a commune in the Aube department in north-central France.

== Population ==
Historical population
Year	Pop.	±% p.a.
1968	295	—
1975	336	+1.88%
1982	285	−2.32%
1990	304	+0.81%
1999	306	+0.07%
2007	334	+1.10%
2012	328	−0.36%
2017	326	−0.12%
2023	321	−0.26%
Source: INSEE

== See also ==
- Communes of the Aube department
