= Bertignolles =

Commune in Grand Est, France

- Commune
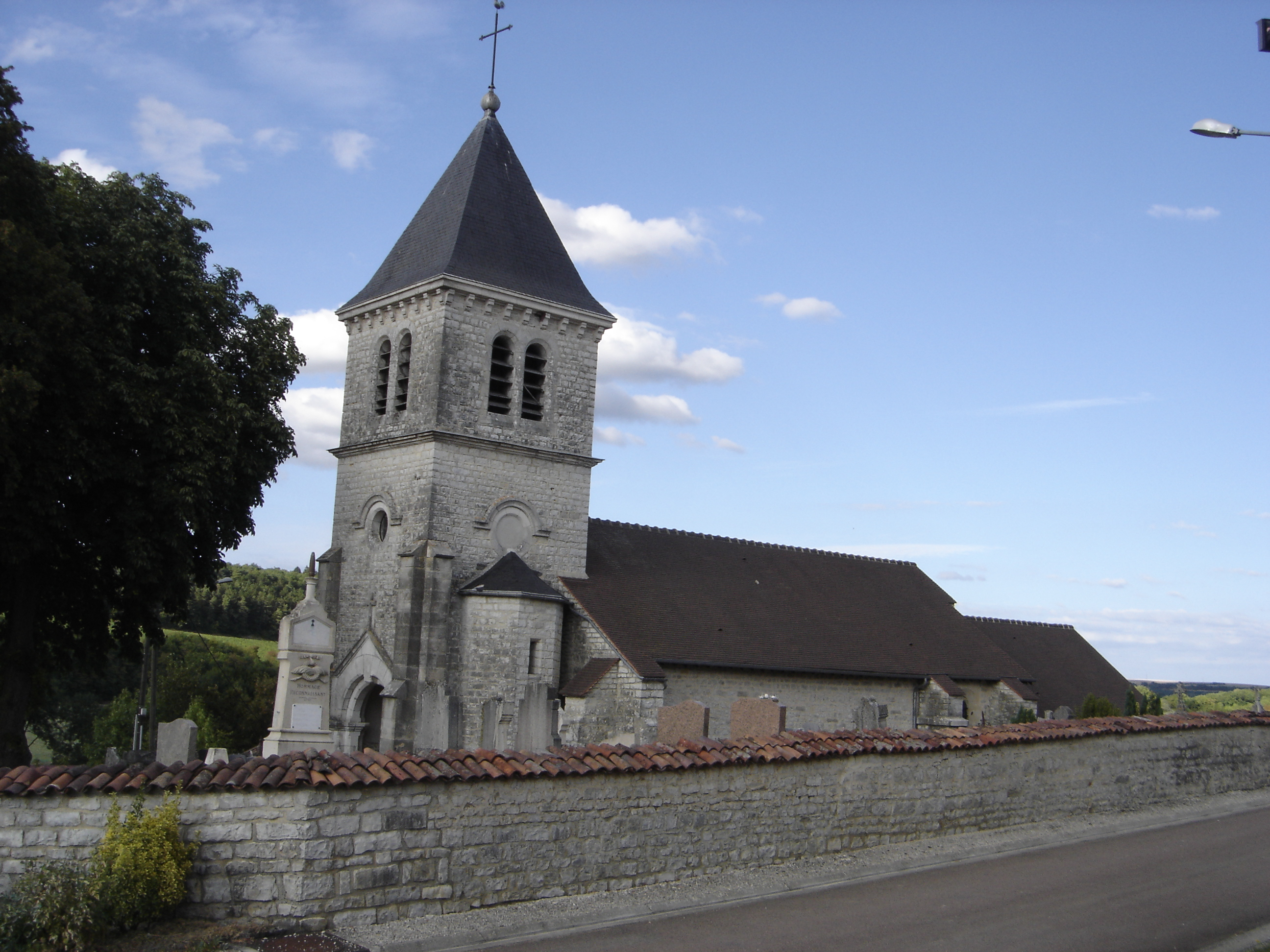
- The church in Bertignolles
- Location of Bertignolles
- Location within France Location within Grand Est
- Coordinates: 48°07′47″N 4°31′09″E
- Country: France
- Region: Grand Est
- Department: Aube
- Arrondissement: Troyes
- Canton: Bar-sur-Seine

Government
  - Mayor (2020–2026): Dominique Boithier
- Area^{1}: 6.19 km^{2} (2.39 sq mi)
- Elevation: 250 m (820 ft)
- Population (2023): 52
  - Density: 8.4/km^{2} (22/sq mi)
- Time zone: UTC+01:00 (CET)
  - Summer (DST): UTC+02:00 (CEST)
- INSEE/Postal code: 10041 /10110
- ^{1} French Land Register data, which excludes lakes, ponds, glaciers > 1 km^{2} (0.386 sq mi or 247 acres) and river estuaries.

Bertignolles (French pronunciation: [bɛʁtiɲɔl]) is a commune in the Aube department in north-central France.

== Population ==
Historical population
Year	Pop.	±% p.a.
1968	97	—
1975	84	−2.03%
1982	83	−0.17%
1990	60	−3.98%
1999	64	+0.72%
2007	69	+0.94%
2012	67	−0.59%
2017	52	−4.94%
2023	52	+0.00%
Source: INSEE

== See also ==
- Communes of the Aube department
