= Villemorien =

Commune in Grand Est, France

- Commune
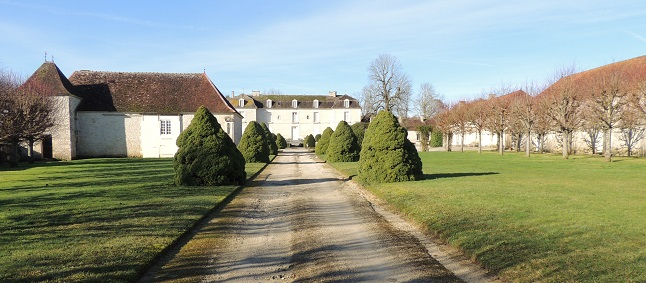
- The chateau in Villemorien
- Location of Villemorien
- Location within France Location within Grand Est
- Coordinates: 48°05′11″N 4°17′50″E
- Country: France
- Region: Grand Est
- Department: Aube
- Arrondissement: Troyes
- Canton: Bar-sur-Seine

Government
  - Mayor (2020–2026): Daniel Laurent
- Area^{1}: 13.8 km^{2} (5.3 sq mi)
- Elevation: 186 m (610 ft)
- Population (2023): 203
  - Density: 14.7/km^{2} (38.1/sq mi)
- Time zone: UTC+01:00 (CET)
  - Summer (DST): UTC+02:00 (CEST)
- INSEE/Postal code: 10418 /10110
- ^{1} French Land Register data, which excludes lakes, ponds, glaciers > 1 km^{2} (0.386 sq mi or 247 acres) and river estuaries.

Villemorien (French pronunciation: [vilmɔʁjɛ̃]) is a commune in the Aube department in north-central France.

== Population ==
Historical population
Year	Pop.	±% p.a.
1968	192	—
1975	200	+0.58%
1982	181	−1.42%
1990	192	+0.74%
1999	172	−1.21%
2007	191	+1.32%
2012	222	+3.05%
2017	207	−1.39%
2023	203	−0.32%
Source: INSEE

== See also ==
- Communes of the Aube department
