= Magnant, Aube =

Commune in Grand Est, France

Magnant
- Commune
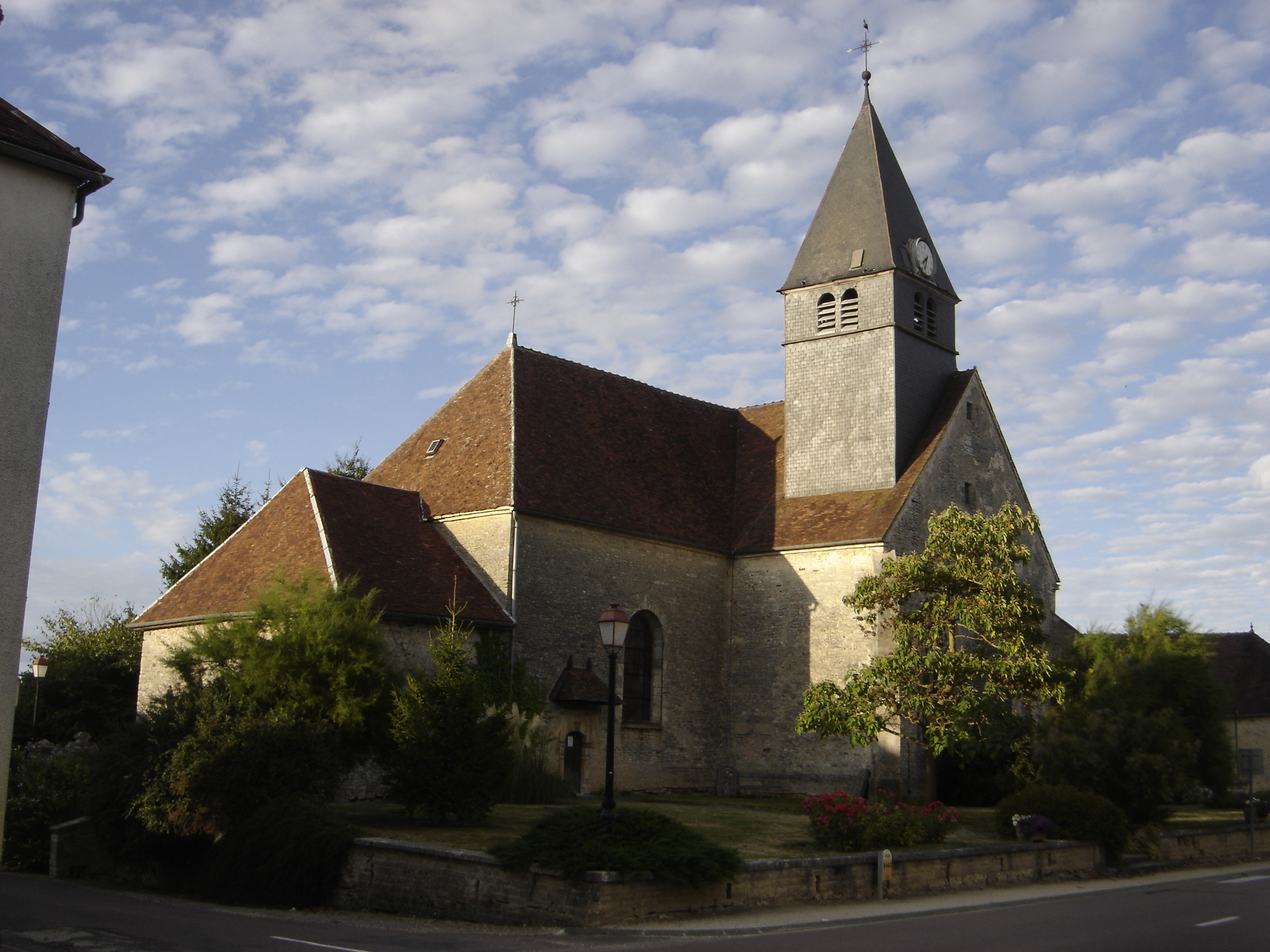
- The church in Magnant
- Location of Magnant
- Location within France Location within Grand Est
- Coordinates: 48°10′16″N 4°25′24″E
- Country: France
- Region: Grand Est
- Department: Aube
- Arrondissement: Troyes
- Canton: Bar-sur-Seine

Government
  - Mayor (2020–2026): Francine Bonzano
- Area^{1}: 15.32 km^{2} (5.92 sq mi)
- Elevation: 234 m (768 ft)
- Population (2023): 164
  - Density: 10.7/km^{2} (27.7/sq mi)
- Time zone: UTC+01:00 (CET)
  - Summer (DST): UTC+02:00 (CEST)
- INSEE/Postal code: 10213 /10110
- ^{1} French Land Register data, which excludes lakes, ponds, glaciers > 1 km^{2} (0.386 sq mi or 247 acres) and river estuaries.

Magnant (French pronunciation: [maɲɑ̃]) is a commune in the Aube department in north-central France.

== Population ==
Historical population
Year	Pop.	±% p.a.
1968	202	—
1975	186	−1.17%
1982	149	−3.12%
1990	185	+2.74%
1999	190	+0.30%
2007	177	−0.88%
2012	177	+0.00%
2017	162	−1.76%
2023	164	+0.20%
Source: INSEE

== See also ==
- Communes of the Aube department
