= Noé-les-Mallets =

Commune in Grand Est, France

- Commune
- Coat of arms
- Location of Noé-les-Mallets
- Location within France Location within Grand Est
- Coordinates: 48°06′05″N 4°34′17″E
- Country: France
- Region: Grand Est
- Department: Aube
- Arrondissement: Troyes
- Canton: Bar-sur-Seine

Government
  - Mayor (2020–2026): Sébastien Prunier
- Area^{1}: 8.33 km^{2} (3.22 sq mi)
- Elevation: 280 m (920 ft)
- Population (2023): 104
  - Density: 12.5/km^{2} (32.3/sq mi)
- Time zone: UTC+01:00 (CET)
  - Summer (DST): UTC+02:00 (CEST)
- INSEE/Postal code: 10264 /10360
- ^{1} French Land Register data, which excludes lakes, ponds, glaciers > 1 km^{2} (0.386 sq mi or 247 acres) and river estuaries.

Noé-les-Mallets (French pronunciation: [nɔe le malɛ]; before 2011: Noë-les-Mallets) is a commune in the Aube department in north-central France.

== Population ==
Historical population
Year	Pop.	±% p.a.
1968	146	—
1975	150	+0.39%
1982	137	−1.29%
1990	142	+0.45%
1999	137	−0.40%
2007	120	−1.64%
2012	114	−1.02%
2017	117	+0.52%
2023	104	−1.94%
Source: INSEE

== See also ==
- Communes of the Aube department
