= Chervey =

Commune in Grand Est, France

- Commune
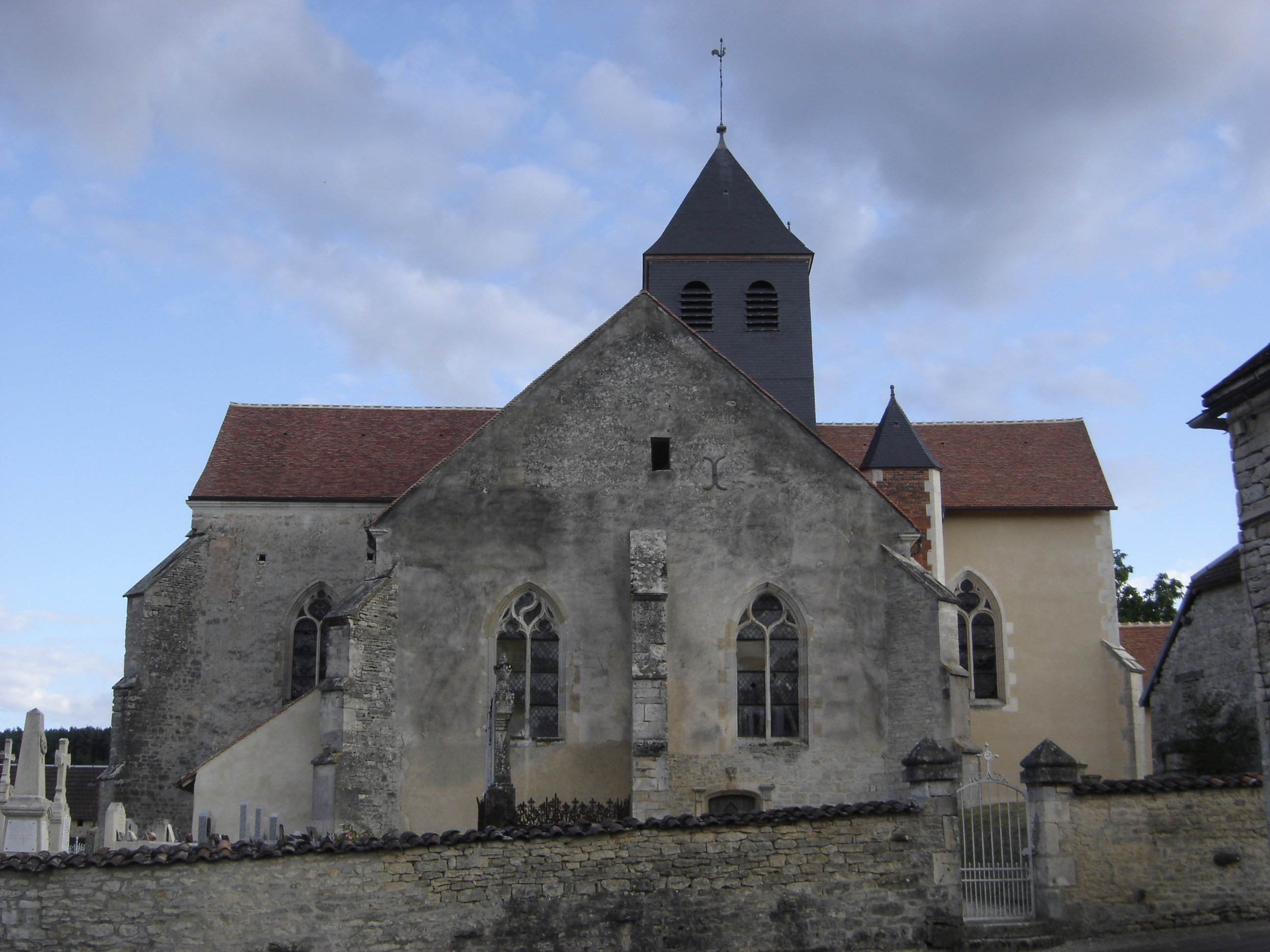
- The church in Chervey
- Location of Chervey
- Location within France Location within Grand Est
- Coordinates: 48°07′33″N 4°29′34″E
- Country: France
- Region: Grand Est
- Department: Aube
- Arrondissement: Troyes
- Canton: Bar-sur-Seine

Government
  - Mayor (2020–2026): Michel Simonnot
- Area^{1}: 13.28 km^{2} (5.13 sq mi)
- Elevation: 210 m (690 ft)
- Population (2023): 145
  - Density: 10.9/km^{2} (28.3/sq mi)
- Time zone: UTC+01:00 (CET)
  - Summer (DST): UTC+02:00 (CEST)
- INSEE/Postal code: 10097 /10110
- ^{1} French Land Register data, which excludes lakes, ponds, glaciers > 1 km^{2} (0.386 sq mi or 247 acres) and river estuaries.

Chervey (French pronunciation: [ʃɛʁvɛ]) is a commune in the Aube department in north-central France.

== Population ==
Historical population
Year	Pop.	±% p.a.
1968	208	—
1975	192	−1.14%
1982	185	−0.53%
1990	165	−1.42%
1999	198	+2.05%
2007	193	−0.32%
2012	184	−0.95%
2017	164	−2.28%
2023	145	−2.03%
Source: INSEE

== See also ==
- Communes of the Aube department
