= Marolles-lès-Bailly =

Commune in Grand Est, France

- Commune
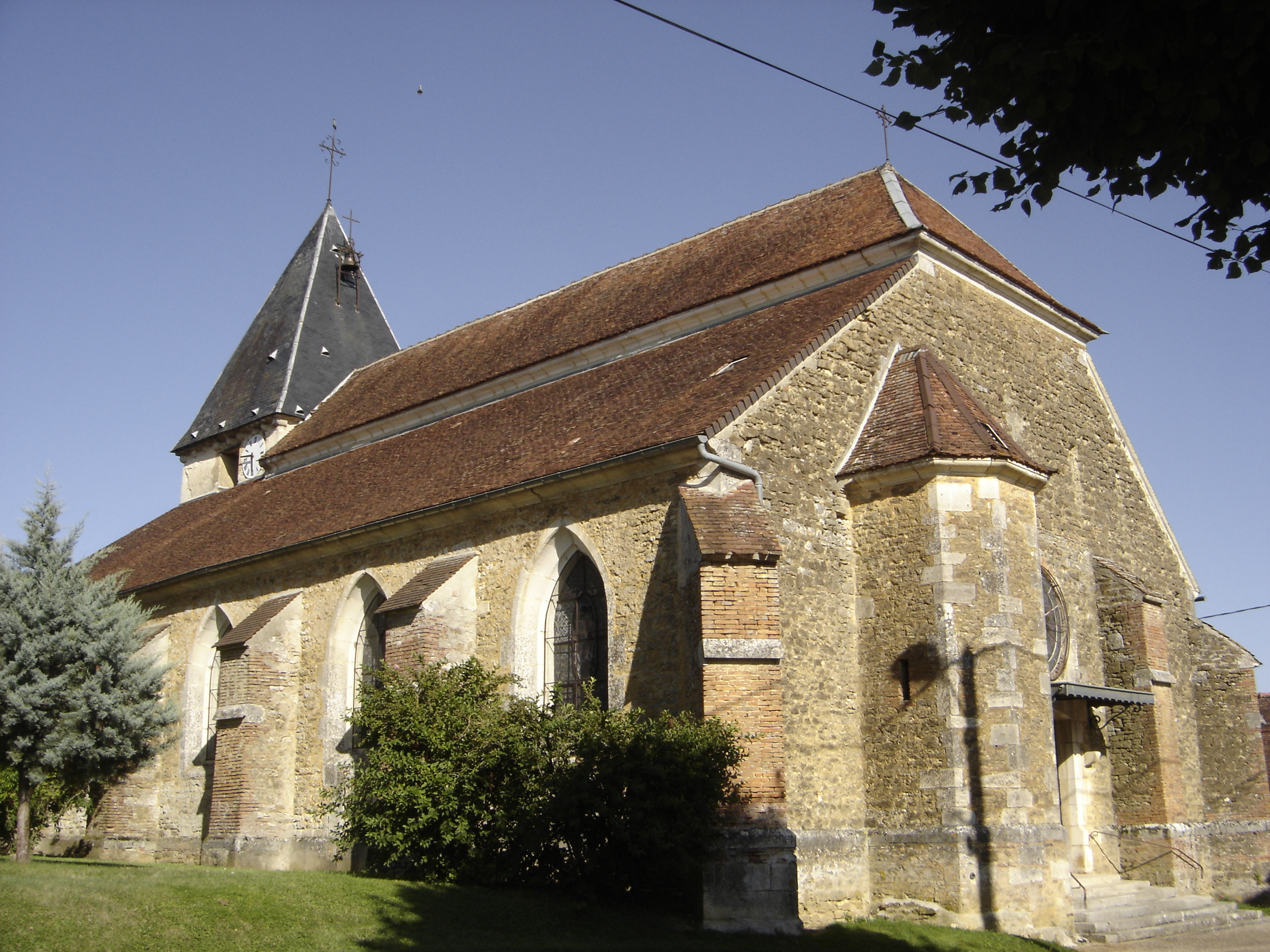
- The church in Marolles-lès-Bailly

- Coat of arms
- Location of Marolles-lès-Bailly
- Location within France Location within Grand Est
- Coordinates: 48°11′08″N 4°20′46″E
- Country: France
- Region: Grand Est
- Department: Aube
- Arrondissement: Troyes
- Canton: Bar-sur-Seine

Government
  - Mayor (2020–2026): Marion Quartier
- Area^{1}: 4.4 km^{2} (1.7 sq mi)
- Elevation: 205 m (673 ft)
- Population (2023): 115
  - Density: 26/km^{2} (68/sq mi)
- Time zone: UTC+01:00 (CET)
  - Summer (DST): UTC+02:00 (CEST)
- INSEE/Postal code: 10226 /10110
- ^{1} French Land Register data, which excludes lakes, ponds, glaciers > 1 km^{2} (0.386 sq mi or 247 acres) and river estuaries.

Marolles-lès-Bailly (French pronunciation: [maʁɔl lɛ baji]) is a commune in the Aube department in north-central France.

== Population ==
Historical population
Year	Pop.	±% p.a.
1968	127	—
1975	106	−2.55%
1982	116	+1.30%
1990	119	+0.32%
1999	100	−1.91%
2007	109	+1.08%
2012	105	−0.74%
2017	106	+0.19%
2023	115	+1.37%
Source: INSEE

== See also ==
- Communes of the Aube department
