= Bourguignons, Aube =

Commune in Grand Est, France

Bourguignons
- Commune
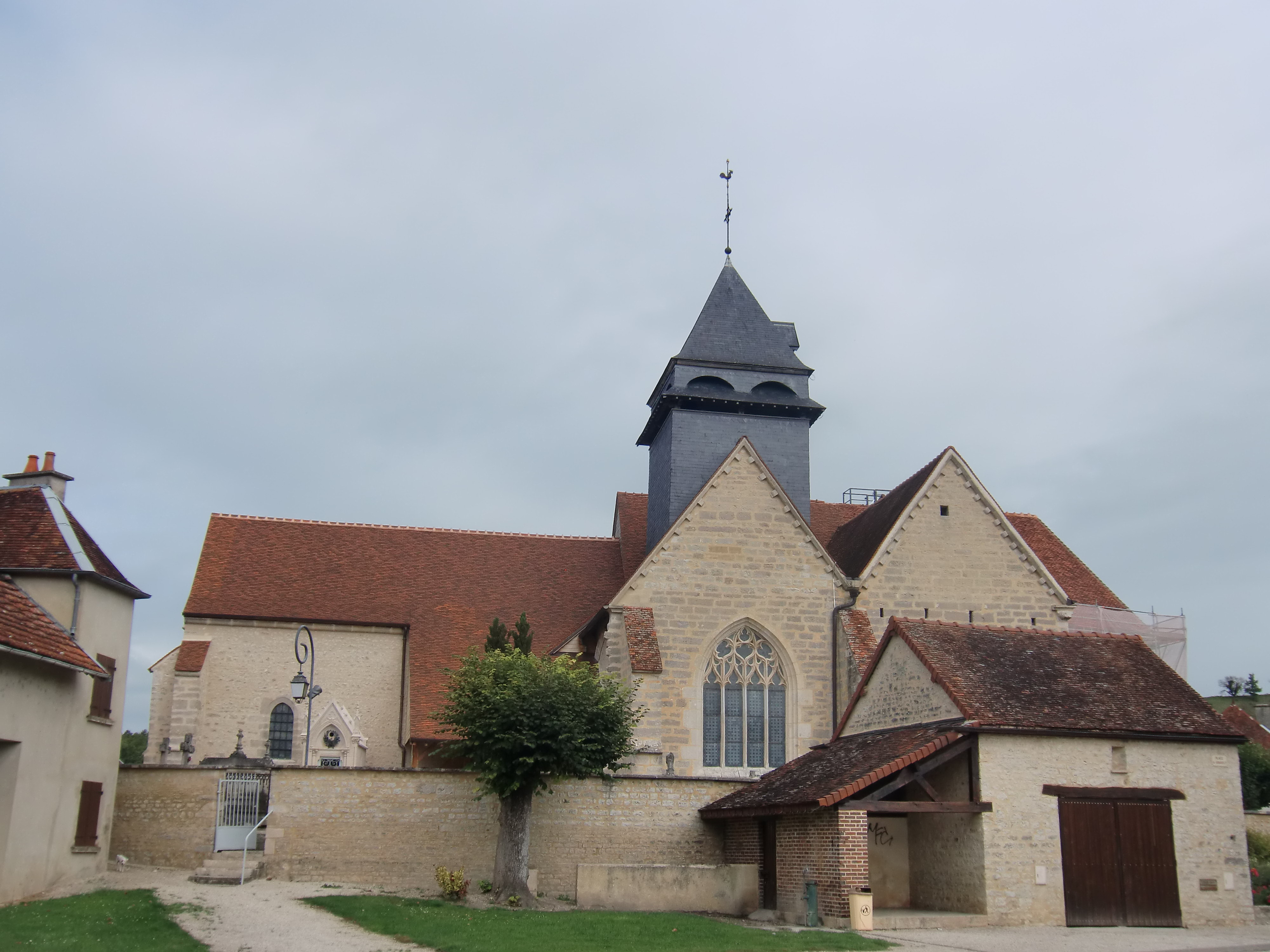
- The church in Bourguignons

- Coat of arms
- Location of Bourguignons
- Location within France Location within Grand Est
- Coordinates: 48°07′54″N 4°21′35″E
- Country: France
- Region: Grand Est
- Department: Aube
- Arrondissement: Troyes
- Canton: Bar-sur-Seine

Government
  - Mayor (2020–2026): Claude Berlot
- Area^{1}: 16.42 km^{2} (6.34 sq mi)
- Elevation: 168 m (551 ft)
- Population (2023): 247
  - Density: 15.0/km^{2} (39.0/sq mi)
- Time zone: UTC+01:00 (CET)
  - Summer (DST): UTC+02:00 (CEST)
- INSEE/Postal code: 10055 /10110
- ^{1} French Land Register data, which excludes lakes, ponds, glaciers > 1 km^{2} (0.386 sq mi or 247 acres) and river estuaries.

Bourguignons (French pronunciation: [buʁɡiɲɔ̃]) is a commune in the Aube department in north-central France.

== Population ==
Historical population
Year	Pop.	±% p.a.
1968	256	—
1975	219	−2.21%
1982	220	+0.07%
1990	261	+2.16%
1999	280	+0.78%
2007	280	+0.00%
2012	279	−0.07%
2017	283	+0.29%
2023	247	−2.24%
Source: INSEE

== See also ==
- Communes of the Aube department
