= Chacenay =

Commune in Grand Est, France

- Commune
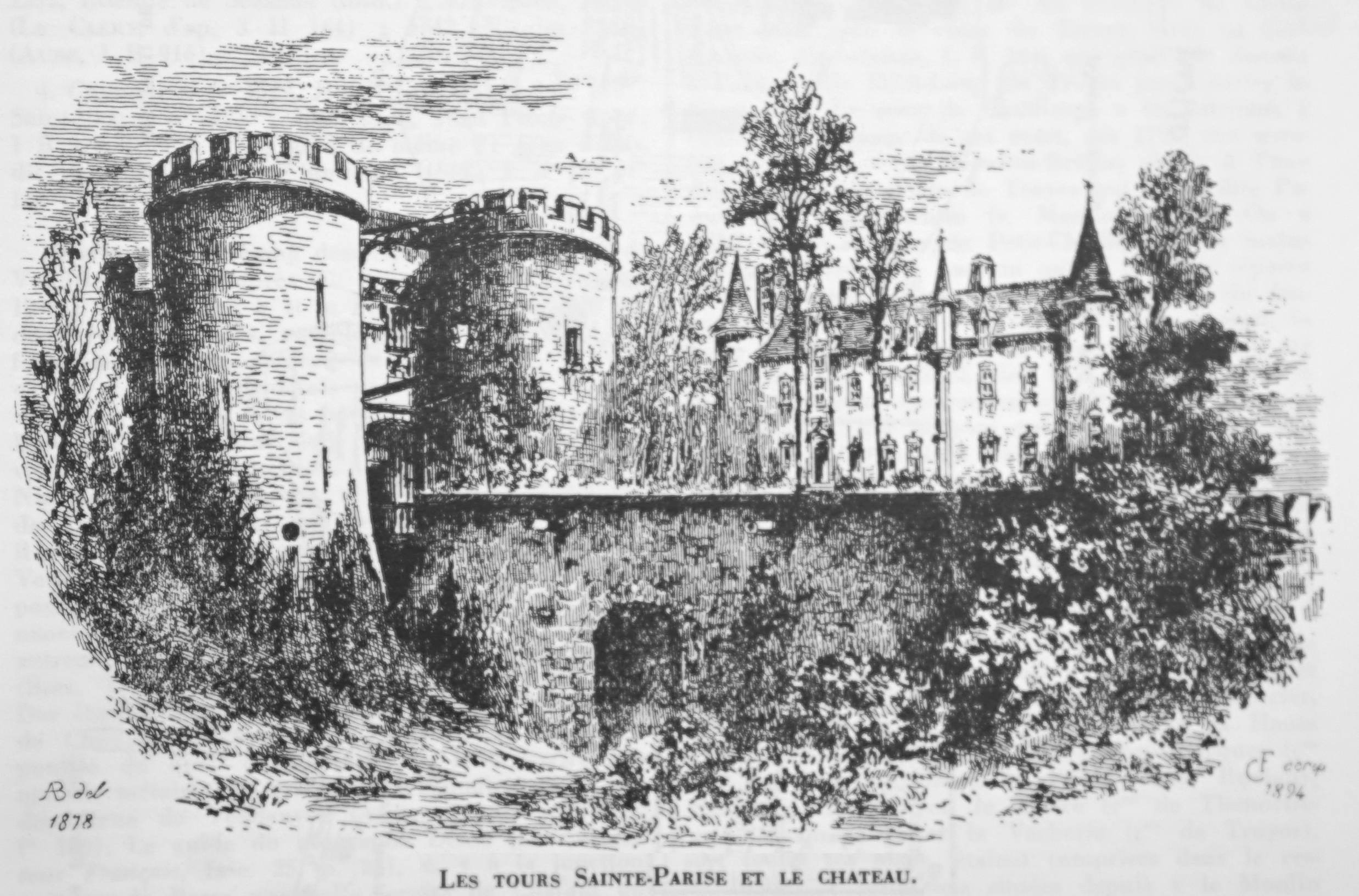
- The ancient view of the castle of Chacenay
- Location of Chacenay
- Location within France Location within Grand Est
- Coordinates: 48°06′58″N 4°31′41″E
- Country: France
- Region: Grand Est
- Department: Aube
- Arrondissement: Troyes
- Canton: Bar-sur-Seine

Government
  - Mayor (2020–2026): Jean-Pierre Perreau
- Area^{1}: 7.8 km^{2} (3.0 sq mi)
- Elevation: 244 m (801 ft)
- Population (2023): 52
  - Density: 6.7/km^{2} (17/sq mi)
- Time zone: UTC+01:00 (CET)
  - Summer (DST): UTC+02:00 (CEST)
- INSEE/Postal code: 10071 /10110
- ^{1} French Land Register data, which excludes lakes, ponds, glaciers > 1 km^{2} (0.386 sq mi or 247 acres) and river estuaries.

Chacenay is a commune in the Aube department in north-central France.

== Population ==
Historical population
Year	Pop.	±% p.a.
1968	72	—
1975	74	+0.39%
1982	78	+0.75%
1990	68	−1.70%
1999	60	−1.38%
2007	62	+0.41%
2012	53	−3.09%
2017	49	−1.56%
2023	52	+1.00%
Source: INSEE

== Sights ==
- The Château de Chacenay is a castle begun in the 13th century.

== See also ==
- Communes of the Aube department
