= Canton of Bar-sur-Seine =

Coordinates: 48.11°N 4.38°E

- Canton
- Situation of the canton of Bar-sur-Seine in the department of Aube
- Country: France
- Region: Grand Est
- Department: Aube
- No. of communes: {{{nbcomm}}}
- Population (2023): 16,062
- INSEE code: 1004

The canton of Bar-sur-Seine is an administrative division of the Aube department, northeastern France. Its borders were modified at the French canton reorganisation which came into effect in March 2015. Its seat is in Bar-sur-Seine.

It consists of the following communes:

1. Bar-sur-Seine
2. Bertignolles
3. Bourguignons
4. Briel-sur-Barse
5. Buxeuil
6. Buxières-sur-Arce
7. Celles-sur-Ource
8. Chacenay
9. Chappes
10. Chauffour-lès-Bailly
11. Chervey
12. Courtenot
13. Courteron
14. Cunfin
15. Éguilly-sous-Bois
16. Essoyes
17. Fontette
18. Fouchères
19. Fralignes
20. Gyé-sur-Seine
21. Jully-sur-Sarce
22. Landreville
23. Loches-sur-Ource
24. Magnant
25. Marolles-lès-Bailly
26. Merrey-sur-Arce
27. Mussy-sur-Seine
28. Neuville-sur-Seine
29. Noé-les-Mallets
30. Plaines-Saint-Lange
31. Poligny
32. Polisot
33. Polisy
34. Rumilly-lès-Vaudes
35. Saint-Parres-lès-Vaudes
36. Saint-Usage
37. Thieffrain
38. Vaudes
39. Verpillières-sur-Ource
40. Villemorien
41. Villemoyenne
42. Ville-sur-Arce
43. Villy-en-Trodes
44. Virey-sous-Bar
45. Vitry-le-Croisé
46. Viviers-sur-Artaut
