= Merrey-sur-Arce =

Commune in Grand Est, France

- Commune
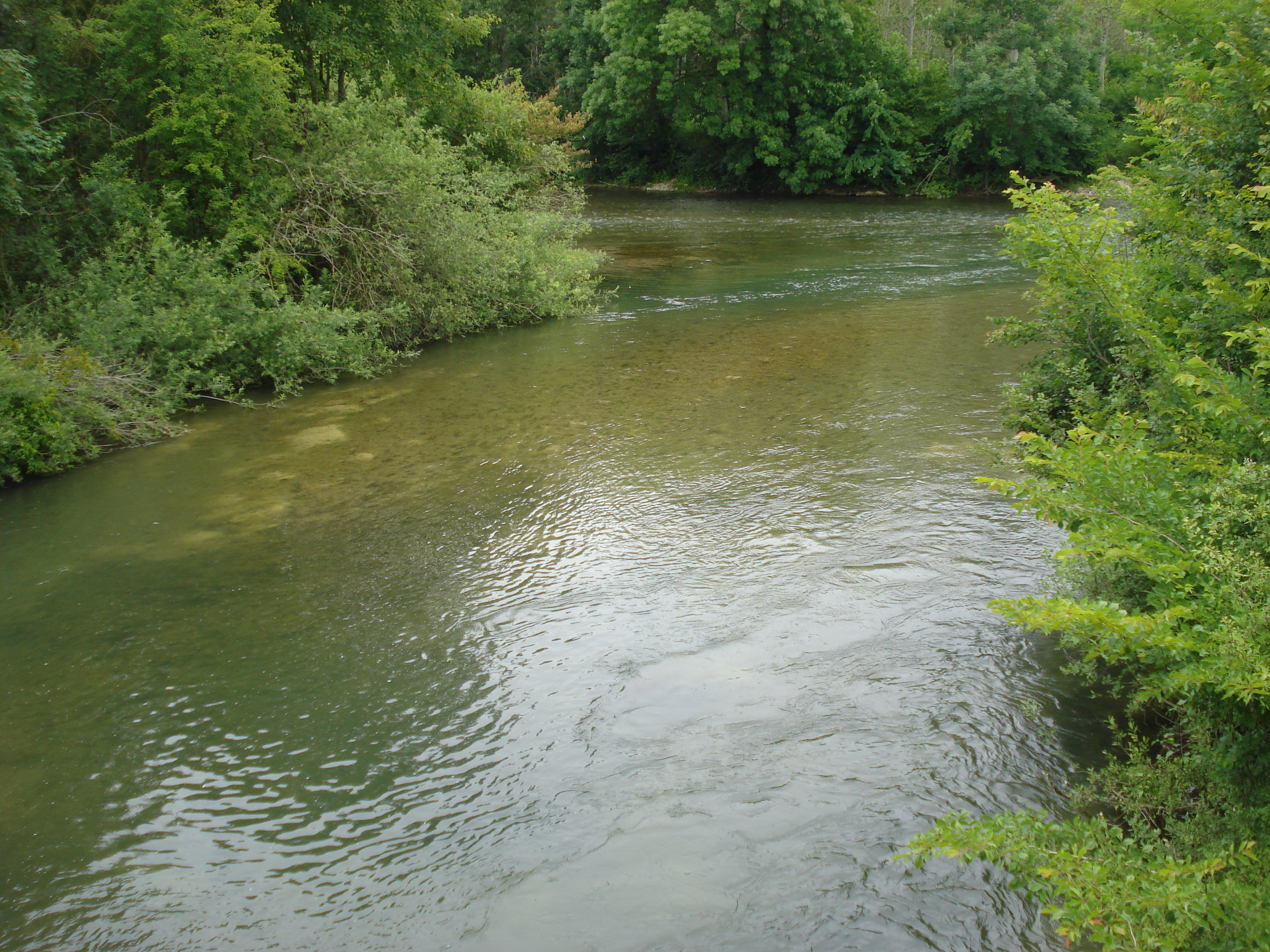
- Confluence of the Ource and the Seine

- Coat of arms
- Location of Merrey-sur-Arce
- Location within France Location within Grand Est
- Coordinates: 48°05′48″N 4°23′33″E
- Country: France
- Region: Grand Est
- Department: Aube
- Arrondissement: Troyes
- Canton: Bar-sur-Seine

Government
  - Mayor (2020–2026): Théodore Lacroix
- Area^{1}: 8.39 km^{2} (3.24 sq mi)
- Elevation: 162 m (531 ft)
- Population (2023): 325
  - Density: 38.7/km^{2} (100/sq mi)
- Time zone: UTC+01:00 (CET)
  - Summer (DST): UTC+02:00 (CEST)
- INSEE/Postal code: 10232 /10110
- ^{1} French Land Register data, which excludes lakes, ponds, glaciers > 1 km^{2} (0.386 sq mi or 247 acres) and river estuaries.

Merrey-sur-Arce (French pronunciation: [meʁɛ syʁ aʁs]) is a commune in the Aube department in north-central France.

== Population ==
Historical population
Year	Pop.	±% p.a.
1968	266	—
1975	274	+0.42%
1982	270	−0.21%
1990	288	+0.81%
1999	303	+0.57%
2007	330	+1.07%
2012	314	−0.99%
2017	321	+0.44%
2023	325	+0.21%
Source: INSEE

== See also ==
- Communes of the Aube department
