= Gyé-sur-Seine =

Commune in Grand Est, France

- Commune
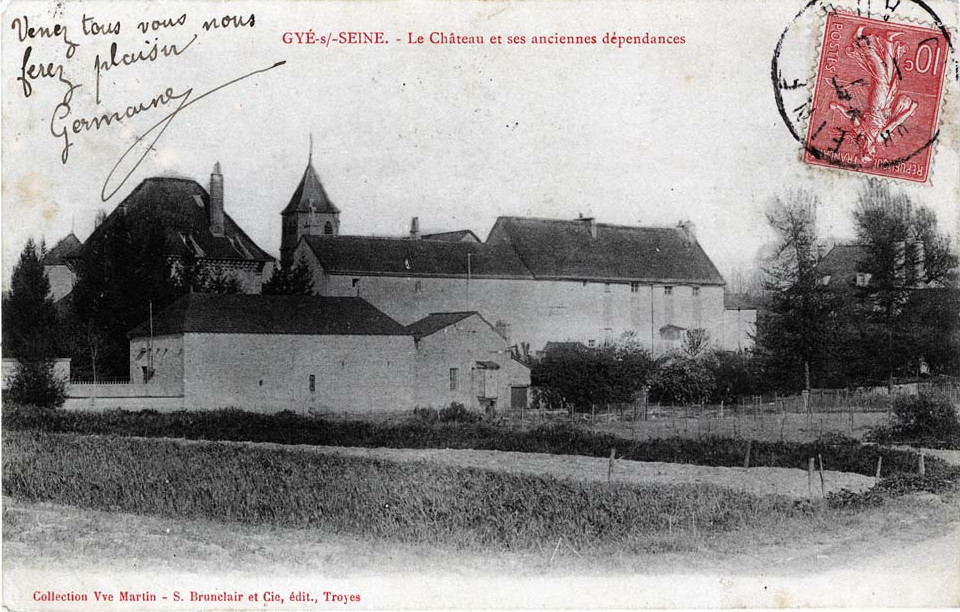
- The ancient castle

- Coat of arms
- Location of Gyé-sur-Seine
- Location within France Location within Grand Est
- Coordinates: 48°01′48″N 4°25′47″E
- Country: France
- Region: Grand Est
- Department: Aube
- Arrondissement: Troyes
- Canton: Bar-sur-Seine
- Intercommunality: Barséquanais en Champagne

Government
  - Mayor (2023–2026): Michel Lombart
- Area^{1}: 23.66 km^{2} (9.14 sq mi)
- Elevation: 173 m (568 ft)
- Highest elevation: 333 m (1,093 ft)
- Lowest elevation: 169 m (554 ft)
- Population (2023): 463
  - Density: 19.6/km^{2} (50.7/sq mi)
- Time zone: UTC+01:00 (CET)
  - Summer (DST): UTC+02:00 (CEST)
- INSEE/Postal code: 10170 /10250
- ^{1} French Land Register data, which excludes lakes, ponds, glaciers > 1 km^{2} (0.386 sq mi or 247 acres) and river estuaries.

Gyé-sur-Seine (French pronunciation: [ʒje syʁ sɛn], literally Gyé on Seine) is a commune in the Aube department in north-central France.

== Population ==
Historical population
Year	Pop.	±% p.a.
1968	513	—
1975	470	−1.24%
1982	489	+0.57%
1990	485	−0.10%
1999	513	+0.63%
2007	519	+0.15%
2012	511	−0.31%
2017	492	−0.75%
2023	463	−1.01%
Source: INSEE

== See also ==
- Communes of the Aube department
