= Jully-sur-Sarce =

Commune in Grand Est, France

- Commune
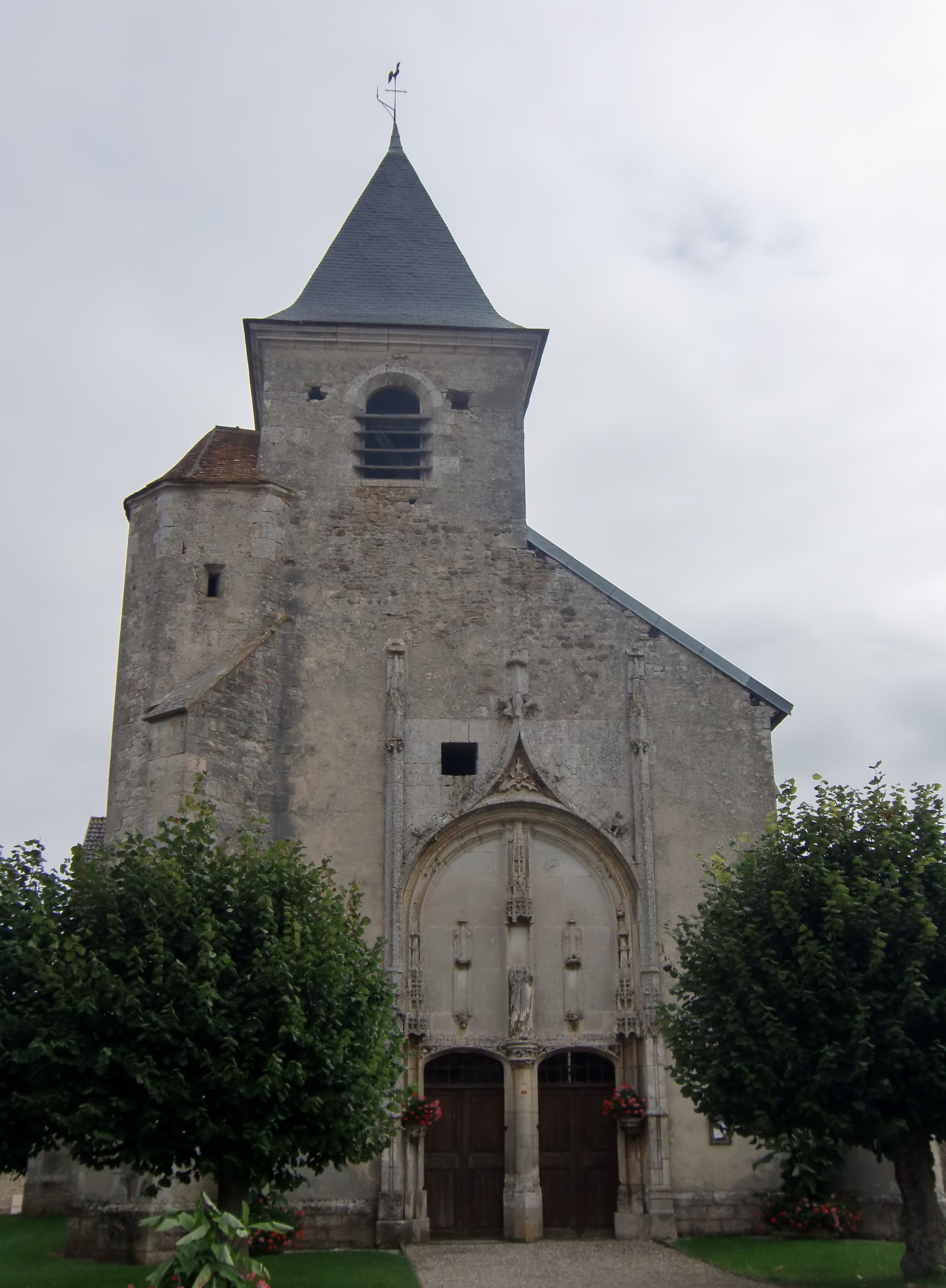
- The church in Jully-sur-Sarce
- Location of Jully-sur-Sarce
- Location within France Location within Grand Est
- Coordinates: 48°06′35″N 4°18′21″E
- Country: France
- Region: Grand Est
- Department: Aube
- Arrondissement: Troyes
- Canton: Bar-sur-Seine
- Intercommunality: Barséquanais en Champagne

Government
  - Mayor (2020–2026): Thierry Butat
- Area^{1}: 30.44 km^{2} (11.75 sq mi)
- Elevation: 216 m (709 ft)
- Highest elevation: 233 m (764 ft)
- Lowest elevation: 144 m (472 ft)
- Population (2023): 232
  - Density: 7.62/km^{2} (19.7/sq mi)
- Time zone: UTC+01:00 (CET)
  - Summer (DST): UTC+02:00 (CEST)
- INSEE/Postal code: 10181 /10260
- ^{1} French Land Register data, which excludes lakes, ponds, glaciers > 1 km^{2} (0.386 sq mi or 247 acres) and river estuaries.

Jully-sur-Sarce (French pronunciation: [ʒyli syʁ saʁs]) is a commune in the Aube department in north-central France.

== Population ==
Historical population
Year	Pop.	±% p.a.
1968	269	—
1975	247	−1.21%
1982	240	−0.41%
1990	244	+0.21%
1999	274	+1.30%
2007	296	+0.97%
2012	274	−1.53%
2017	238	−2.78%
2023	232	−0.42%
Source: INSEE

== See also ==
- Communes of the Aube department
