= Plaines-Saint-Lange =

Commune in Grand Est, France

- Commune
- Location of Plaines-Saint-Lange
- Location within France Location within Grand Est
- Coordinates: 47°59′30″N 4°28′38″E
- Country: France
- Region: Grand Est
- Department: Aube
- Arrondissement: Troyes
- Canton: Bar-sur-Seine

Government
  - Mayor (2020–2026): Christophe Gavazzi
- Area^{1}: 10.73 km^{2} (4.14 sq mi)
- Elevation: 186 m (610 ft)
- Population (2023): 266
  - Density: 24.8/km^{2} (64.2/sq mi)
- Time zone: UTC+01:00 (CET)
  - Summer (DST): UTC+02:00 (CEST)
- INSEE/Postal code: 10288 /10250
- ^{1} French Land Register data, which excludes lakes, ponds, glaciers > 1 km^{2} (0.386 sq mi or 247 acres) and river estuaries.

Plaines-Saint-Lange (French pronunciation: [plɛn sɛ̃ lɑ̃ʒ]) is a commune in the Aube department in north-central France.

== Population ==
Historical population
Year	Pop.	±% p.a.
1968	514	—
1975	516	+0.06%
1982	469	−1.36%
1990	418	−1.43%
1999	335	−2.43%
2007	322	−0.49%
2012	292	−1.94%
2017	261	−2.22%
2023	266	+0.32%
Source: INSEE

== See also ==
- Communes of the Aube department
