= Château de Chacenay =

Castle in Grand Est, France

Coordinates: 48°6′47″N 4°31′45″E

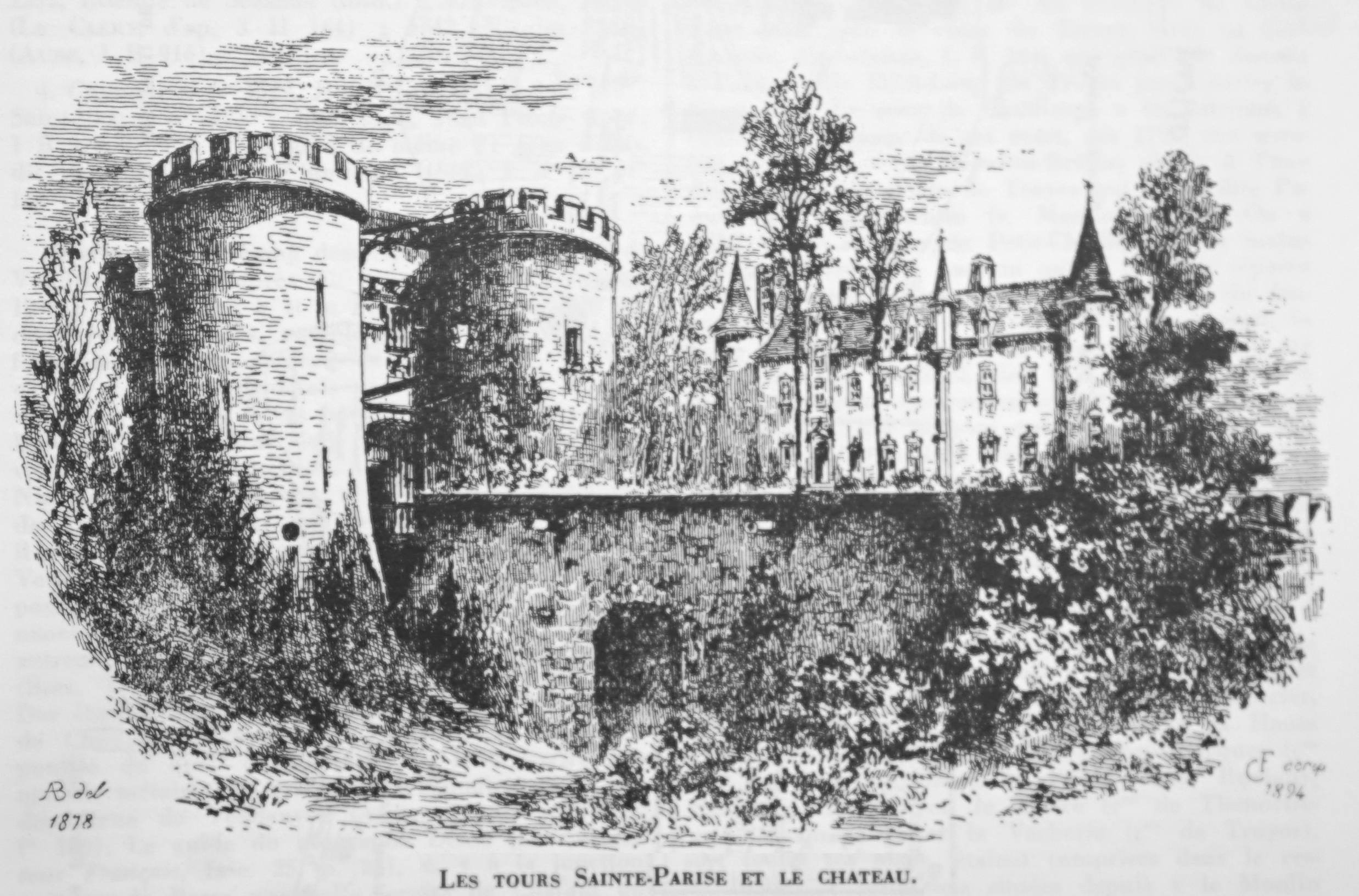
19th century

The Château de Chacenay is a castle situated in the commune of Chacenay, in the Aube département of France.

== History ==
Recorded since 1075, it was the fief of numerous great families over the years. Construction of the castle began in the 13th century. The armoury room contains stone gargoyles that were carved by the same architect who carved the famous gargoyles of Notre Dame.

Sited at the heart of a forest, in the Middle Ages it formed an impregnable fortress thanks to its ramparts, keep (now destroyed), ditches, drawbridge and towers. It was the meeting grounds for one of many of the crusades that happened throughout Europe.

Damaged following the orders of Louis XI, it was over time reconstructed, and destroyed by fire during the French Revolution.

Since 1988, the castle has been owned by Panos and Lina Pervanas. It has been listed since 1990 as a monument historique by the French Ministry of Culture, having been added to the inventory in 1926. It is open to the public during the summer.

== See also ==
- List of castles in France

== Bibliography ==
- Abbé Charles Lalore (1885). "Les sires et les barons de Chacenay". gallica BNF (in French).
