= Vitry-le-Croisé =

Commune in Grand Est, France

- Commune
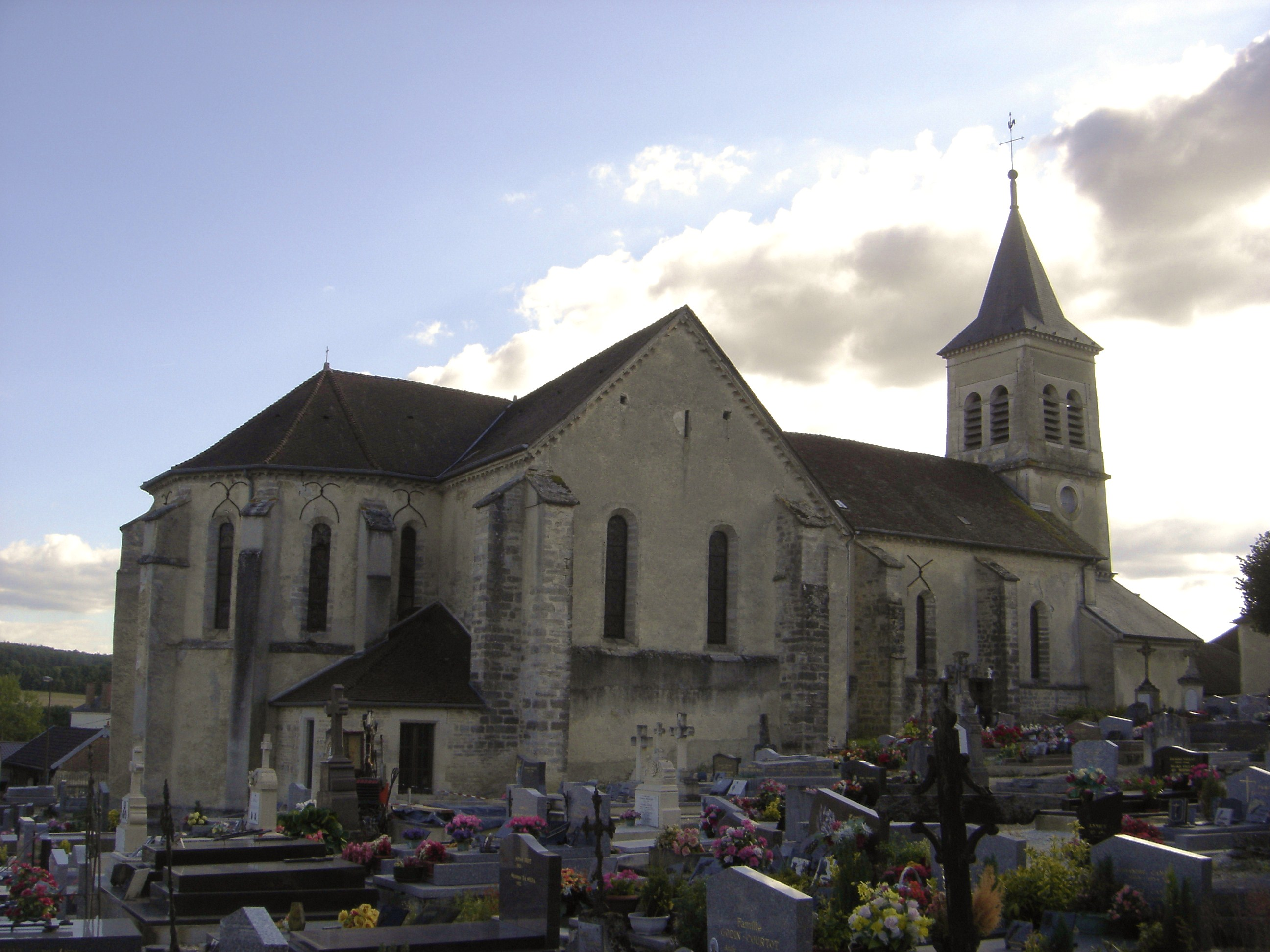
- The church in Vitry-le-Croisé
- Location of Vitry-le-Croisé
- Location within France Location within Grand Est
- Coordinates: 48°08′45″N 4°34′04″E
- Country: France
- Region: Grand Est
- Department: Aube
- Arrondissement: Troyes
- Canton: Bar-sur-Seine
- Intercommunality: Barséquanais en Champagne

Government
  - Mayor (2020–2026): Bernard Lemaitre
- Area^{1}: 32.72 km^{2} (12.63 sq mi)
- Elevation: 330 m (1,080 ft)
- Population (2023): 223
  - Density: 6.82/km^{2} (17.7/sq mi)
- Time zone: UTC+01:00 (CET)
  - Summer (DST): UTC+02:00 (CEST)
- INSEE/Postal code: 10438 /10110
- ^{1} French Land Register data, which excludes lakes, ponds, glaciers > 1 km^{2} (0.386 sq mi or 247 acres) and river estuaries.

Vitry-le-Croisé (French pronunciation: [vitʁi lə kʁwaze]) is a commune in the Aube department in north-central France.

== Population ==
Historical population
Year	Pop.	±% p.a.
1968	381	—
1975	364	−0.65%
1982	300	−2.72%
1990	313	+0.53%
1999	285	−1.04%
2007	265	−0.91%
2012	252	−1.00%
2017	234	−1.47%
2023	223	−0.80%
Source: INSEE

== See also ==
- Communes of the Aube department
