= Thieffrain =

Commune in Grand Est, France

- Commune
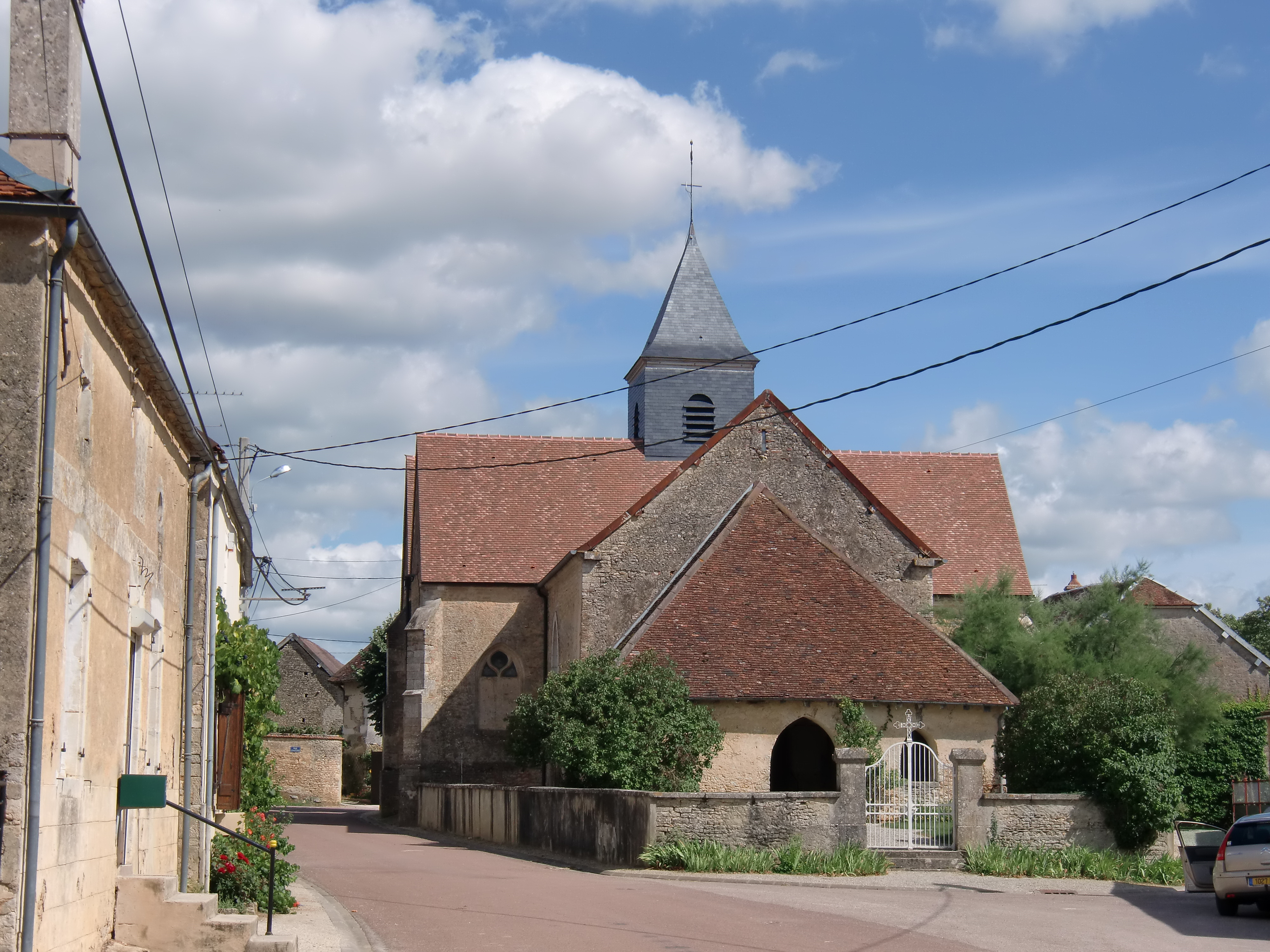
- The church in Thieffrain
- Location of Thieffrain
- Location within France Location within Grand Est
- Coordinates: 48°11′48″N 4°26′29″E
- Country: France
- Region: Grand Est
- Department: Aube
- Arrondissement: Troyes
- Canton: Bar-sur-Seine

Government
  - Mayor (2020–2026): Colette Laplanche
- Area^{1}: 7.36 km^{2} (2.84 sq mi)
- Elevation: 179 m (587 ft)
- Population (2023): 157
  - Density: 21.3/km^{2} (55.2/sq mi)
- Time zone: UTC+01:00 (CET)
  - Summer (DST): UTC+02:00 (CEST)
- INSEE/Postal code: 10376 /10140
- ^{1} French Land Register data, which excludes lakes, ponds, glaciers > 1 km^{2} (0.386 sq mi or 247 acres) and river estuaries.

Thieffrain (French pronunciation: [tjɛfʁɛ̃]) is a commune in the Aube department in north-central France.

== Population ==
Historical population
Year	Pop.	±% p.a.
1968	158	—
1975	151	−0.65%
1982	130	−2.12%
1990	141	+1.02%
1999	143	+0.16%
2007	158	+1.25%
2012	159	+0.13%
2017	154	−0.64%
2023	157	+0.32%
Source: INSEE

== See also ==
- Communes of the Aube department
