= Villy-en-Trodes =

Commune in Grand Est, France

- Commune
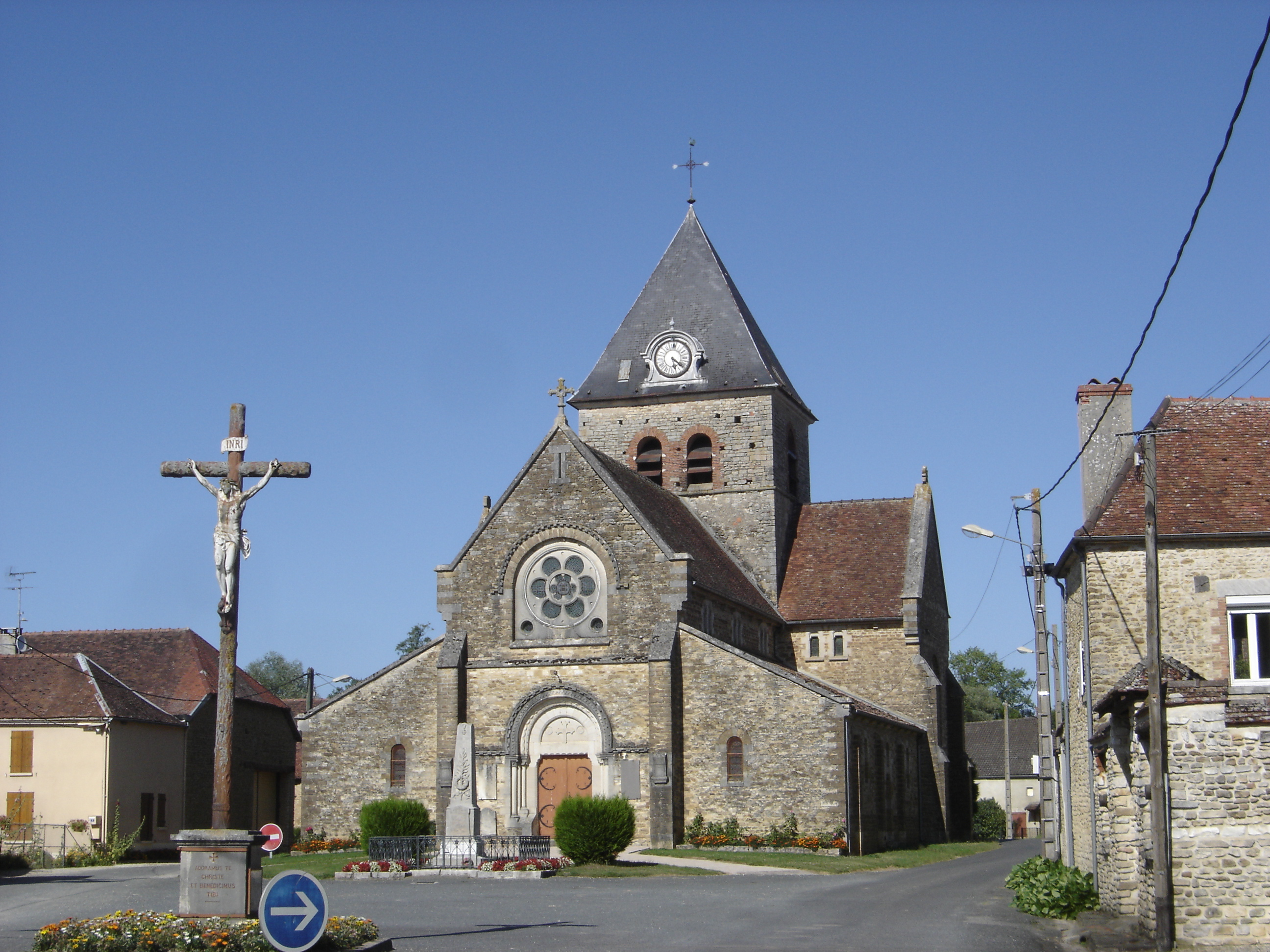
- The church in Villy-en-Trodes

- Coat of arms
- Location of Villy-en-Trodes
- Location within France Location within Grand Est
- Coordinates: 48°11′56″N 4°22′56″E
- Country: France
- Region: Grand Est
- Department: Aube
- Arrondissement: Troyes
- Canton: Bar-sur-Seine

Government
  - Mayor (2020–2026): Bernard Meilliez
- Area^{1}: 17.91 km^{2} (6.92 sq mi)
- Elevation: 163 m (535 ft)
- Population (2023): 245
  - Density: 13.7/km^{2} (35.4/sq mi)
- Time zone: UTC+01:00 (CET)
  - Summer (DST): UTC+02:00 (CEST)
- INSEE/Postal code: 10433 /10140
- ^{1} French Land Register data, which excludes lakes, ponds, glaciers > 1 km^{2} (0.386 sq mi or 247 acres) and river estuaries.

Villy-en-Trodes is a commune in the Aube department in north-central France.

== Population ==
Historical population
Year	Pop.	±% p.a.
1968	270	—
1975	245	−1.38%
1982	239	−0.35%
1990	221	−0.97%
1999	202	−0.99%
2007	225	+1.36%
2012	274	+4.02%
2017	246	−2.13%
2023	245	−0.07%
Source: INSEE

== See also ==
- Communes of the Aube department
