= Verpillières-sur-Ource =

Commune in Grand Est, France

- Commune
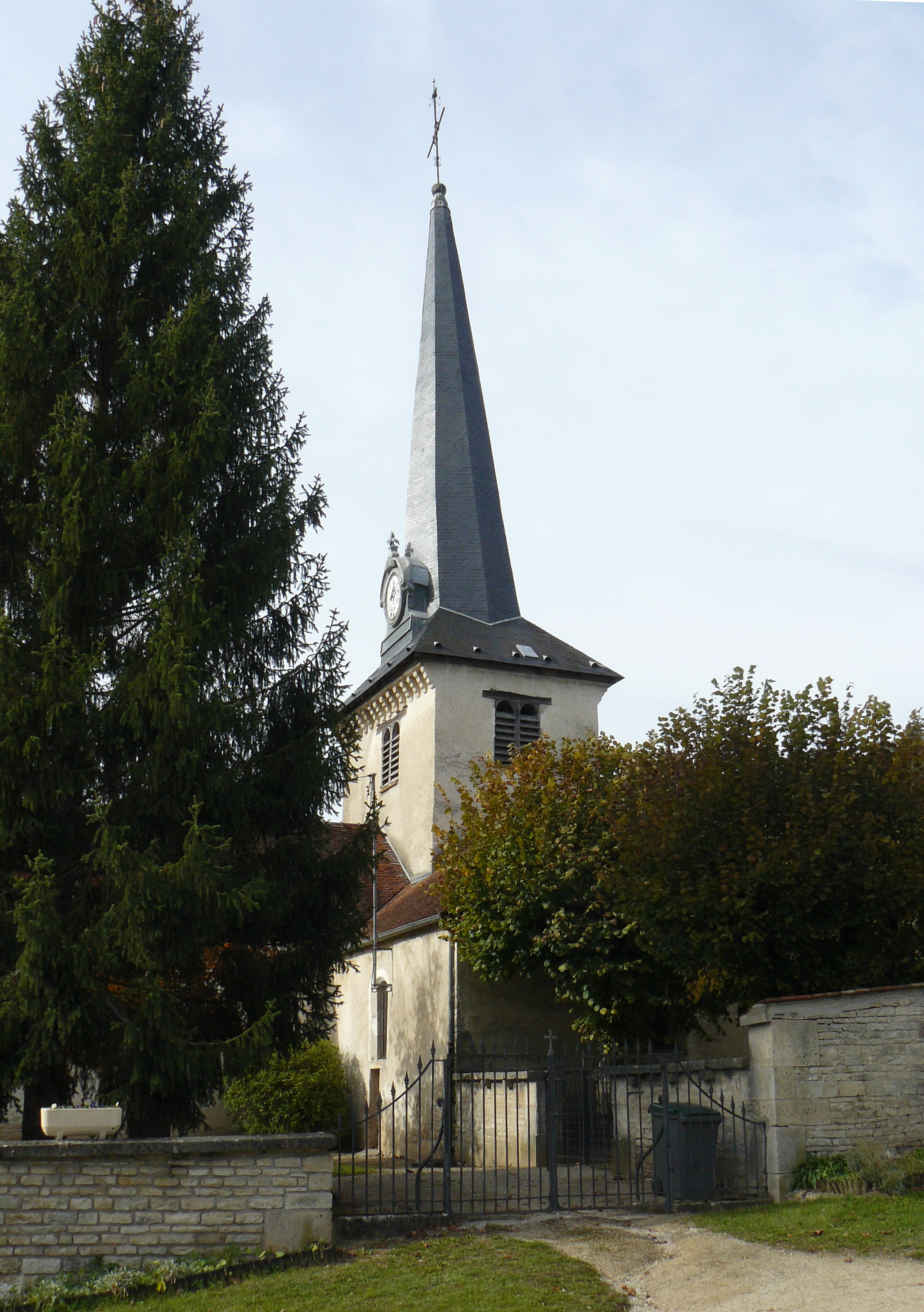
- The church in Verpillières-sur-Ource
- Location of Verpillières-sur-Ource
- Location within France Location within Grand Est
- Coordinates: 48°02′30″N 4°34′12″E
- Country: France
- Region: Grand Est
- Department: Aube
- Arrondissement: Troyes
- Canton: Bar-sur-Seine

Government
  - Mayor (2020–2026): Pervenche Nobili
- Area^{1}: 17.93 km^{2} (6.92 sq mi)
- Elevation: 194 m (636 ft)
- Highest elevation: 346 m (1,135 ft)
- Lowest elevation: 185 m (607 ft)
- Population (2023): 108
  - Density: 6.02/km^{2} (15.6/sq mi)
- Time zone: UTC+01:00 (CET)
  - Summer (DST): UTC+02:00 (CEST)
- INSEE/Postal code: 10404 /10360
- ^{1} French Land Register data, which excludes lakes, ponds, glaciers > 1 km^{2} (0.386 sq mi or 247 acres) and river estuaries.

Verpillières-sur-Ource (French pronunciation: [vɛʁpiljɛʁ syʁ uʁs], literally Verpillières on Ource) is a commune in the Aube department in north-central France.

== Population ==
Historical population
Year	Pop.	±% p.a.
1968	115	—
1975	99	−2.12%
1982	99	+0.00%
1990	101	+0.25%
1999	121	+2.03%
2007	119	−0.21%
2012	115	−0.68%
2017	109	−1.07%
2023	108	−0.15%
Source: INSEE

== See also ==
- Communes of the Aube department
