= Ville-sur-Arce =

Commune in Grand Est, France

- Commune
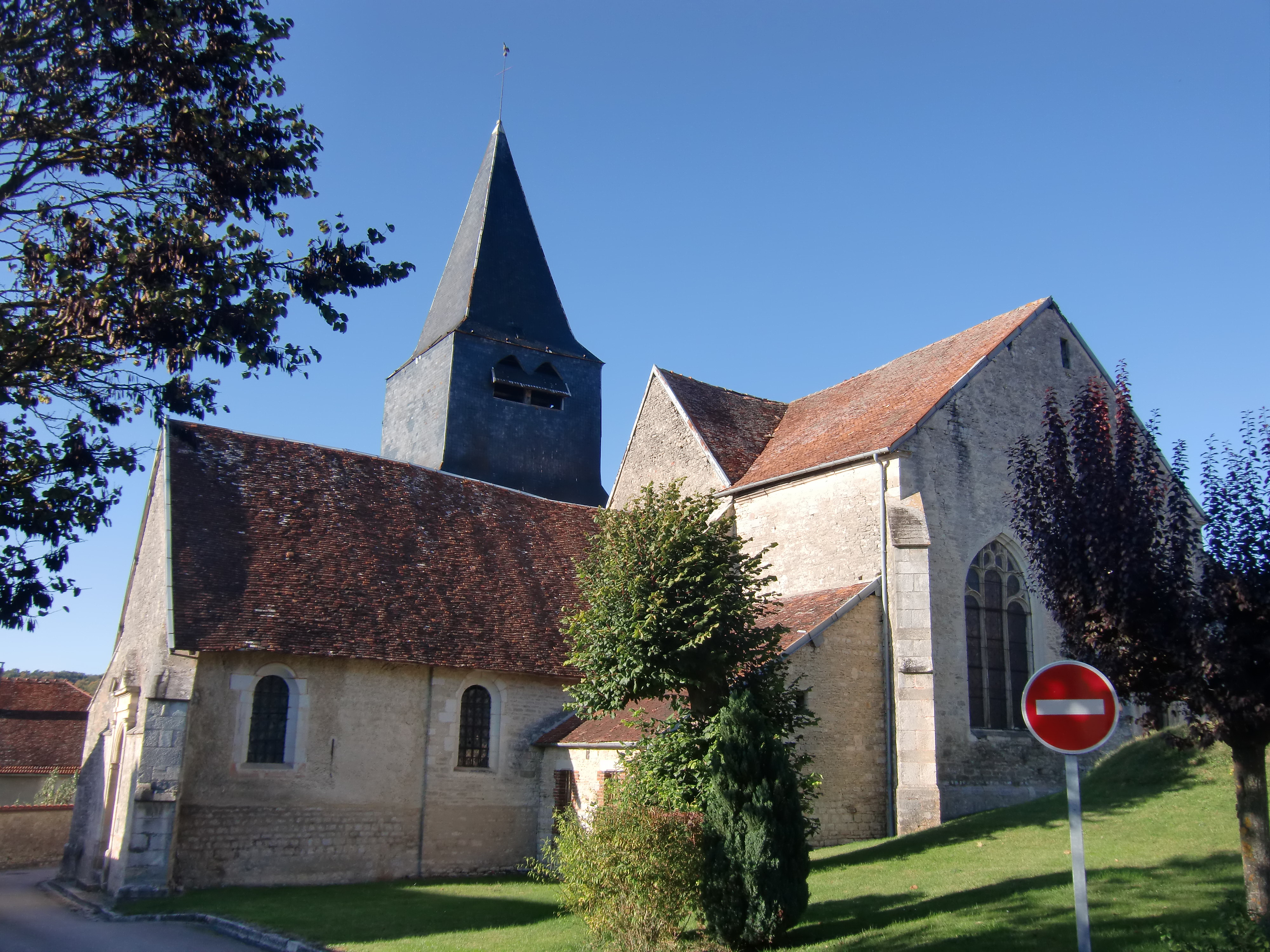
- The church in Ville-sur-Arce
- Location of Ville-sur-Arce
- Location within France Location within Grand Est
- Coordinates: 48°06′28″N 4°26′46″E
- Country: France
- Region: Grand Est
- Department: Aube
- Arrondissement: Troyes
- Canton: Bar-sur-Seine

Government
  - Mayor (2020–2026): Claude Penot
- Area^{1}: 16.16 km^{2} (6.24 sq mi)
- Elevation: 191 m (627 ft)
- Population (2023): 206
  - Density: 12.7/km^{2} (33.0/sq mi)
- Time zone: UTC+01:00 (CET)
  - Summer (DST): UTC+02:00 (CEST)
- INSEE/Postal code: 10427 /10110
- ^{1} French Land Register data, which excludes lakes, ponds, glaciers > 1 km^{2} (0.386 sq mi or 247 acres) and river estuaries.

Ville-sur-Arce (French pronunciation: [vil syʁ aʁs]) is a commune in the Aube department in north-central France.

== Population ==
Historical population
Year	Pop.	±% p.a.
1968	260	—
1975	255	−0.28%
1982	261	+0.33%
1990	280	+0.88%
1999	264	−0.65%
2007	244	−0.98%
2012	241	−0.25%
2017	212	−2.53%
2023	206	−0.48%
Source: INSEE

== See also ==
- Communes of the Aube department
