= Éguilly-sous-Bois =

Commune in Grand Est, France

- Commune
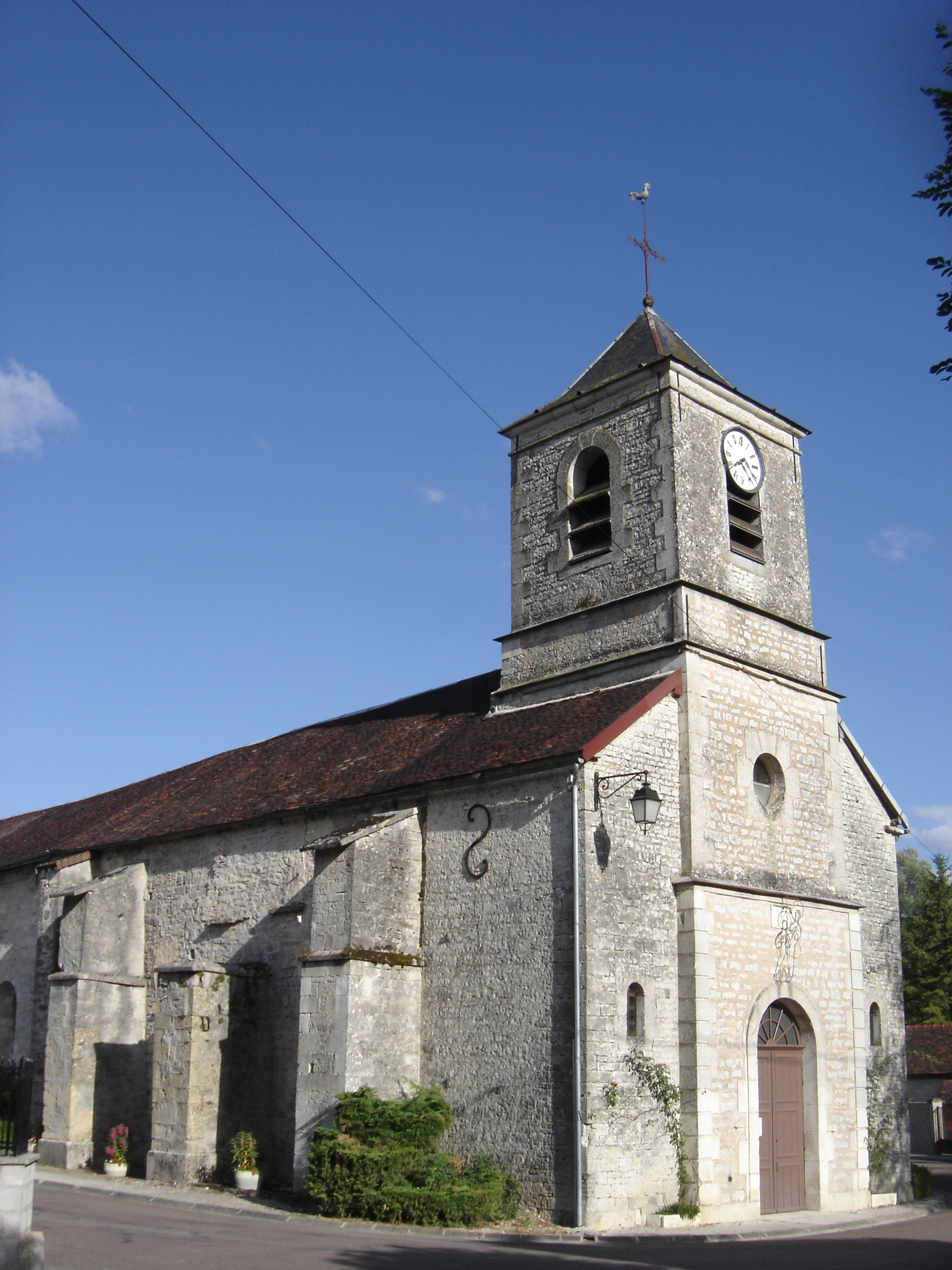
- The church in Éguilly-sous-Bois

- Coat of arms
- Location of Éguilly-sous-Bois
- Location within France Location within Grand Est
- Coordinates: 48°08′25″N 4°32′14″E
- Country: France
- Region: Grand Est
- Department: Aube
- Arrondissement: Troyes
- Canton: Bar-sur-Seine

Government
  - Mayor (2022–2026): Maryline Gelu
- Area^{1}: 10.11 km^{2} (3.90 sq mi)
- Elevation: 220 m (720 ft)
- Population (2023): 111
  - Density: 11.0/km^{2} (28.4/sq mi)
- Time zone: UTC+01:00 (CET)
  - Summer (DST): UTC+02:00 (CEST)
- INSEE/Postal code: 10136 /10110
- ^{1} French Land Register data, which excludes lakes, ponds, glaciers > 1 km^{2} (0.386 sq mi or 247 acres) and river estuaries.

Éguilly-sous-Bois (French pronunciation: [eɡiji su bwa]) is a commune in the Aube department in north-central France.

== Population ==
Historical population
Year	Pop.	±% p.a.
1968	111	—
1975	96	−2.05%
1982	105	+1.29%
1990	104	−0.12%
1999	98	−0.66%
2007	109	+1.34%
2012	136	+4.53%
2017	117	−2.96%
2023	111	−0.87%
Source: INSEE

== See also ==
- Communes of the Aube department
