= Fralignes =

Commune in Grand Est, France

- Commune
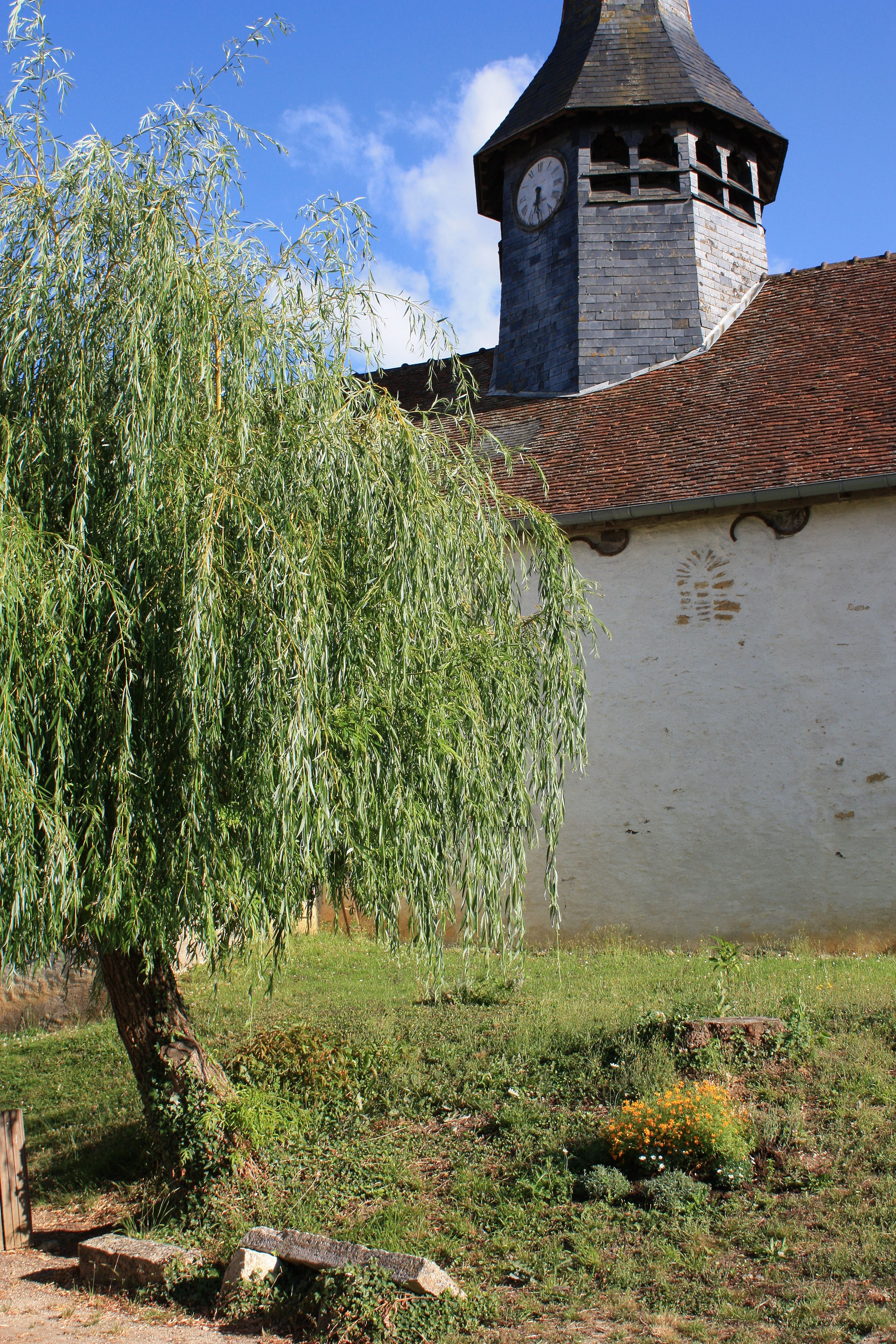
- The church in Fralignes

- Coat of arms
- Location of Fralignes
- Location within France Location within Grand Est
- Coordinates: 48°09′53″N 4°22′30″E
- Country: France
- Region: Grand Est
- Department: Aube
- Arrondissement: Troyes
- Canton: Bar-sur-Seine

Government
  - Mayor (2020–2026): Stéphane Gentilhomme
- Area^{1}: 5.14 km^{2} (1.98 sq mi)
- Elevation: 233 m (764 ft)
- Population (2023): 101
  - Density: 19.6/km^{2} (50.9/sq mi)
- Time zone: UTC+01:00 (CET)
  - Summer (DST): UTC+02:00 (CEST)
- INSEE/Postal code: 10159 /10110
- ^{1} French Land Register data, which excludes lakes, ponds, glaciers > 1 km^{2} (0.386 sq mi or 247 acres) and river estuaries.

Fralignes (French pronunciation: [fʁaliɲ]) is a commune in the Aube department in north-central France.

== Population ==
Historical population
Year	Pop.	±% p.a.
1968	114	—
1975	78	−5.28%
1982	92	+2.39%
1990	76	−2.36%
1999	65	−1.72%
2007	72	+1.29%
2012	84	+3.13%
2017	87	+0.70%
2023	101	+2.52%
Source: INSEE

== See also ==
- Communes of the Aube department
