= Cunfin =

Commune in Grand Est, France

- Commune
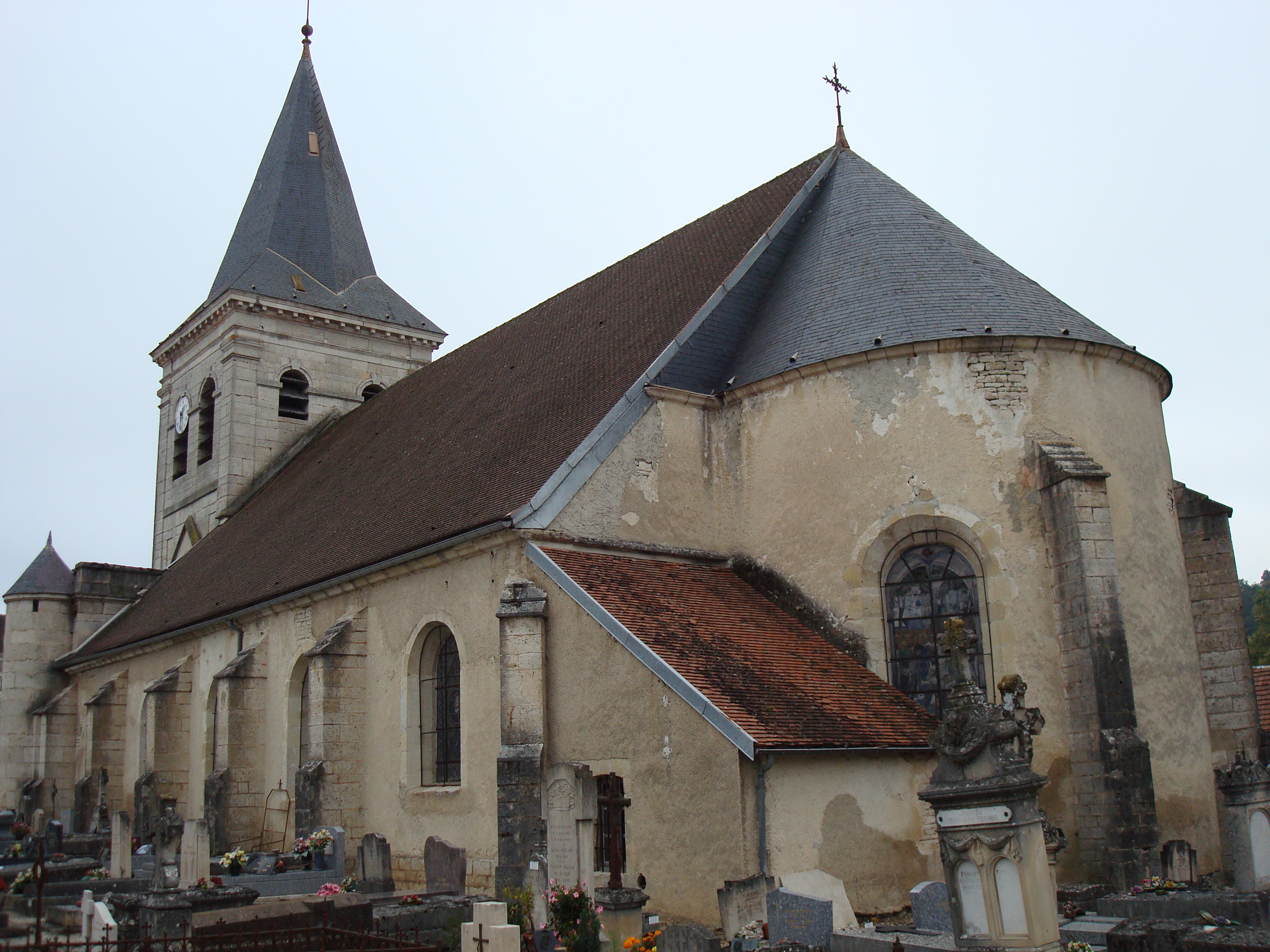
- The church in Cunfin
- Location of Cunfin
- Location within France Location within Grand Est
- Coordinates: 48°02′32″N 4°40′08″E
- Country: France
- Region: Grand Est
- Department: Aube
- Arrondissement: Troyes
- Canton: Bar-sur-Seine

Government
  - Mayor (2020–2026): Virginie Sebert
- Area^{1}: 33.12 km^{2} (12.79 sq mi)
- Elevation: 254 m (833 ft)
- Population (2023): 161
  - Density: 4.86/km^{2} (12.6/sq mi)
- Time zone: UTC+01:00 (CET)
  - Summer (DST): UTC+02:00 (CEST)
- INSEE/Postal code: 10119 /10360
- ^{1} French Land Register data, which excludes lakes, ponds, glaciers > 1 km^{2} (0.386 sq mi or 247 acres) and river estuaries.

Cunfin (French pronunciation: [kœ̃fɛ̃]) is a commune in the Aube department in north-central France.

== Population ==
Historical population
Year	Pop.	±% p.a.
1968	300	—
1975	231	−3.66%
1982	222	−0.57%
1990	237	+0.82%
1999	199	−1.92%
2007	210	+0.67%
2012	198	−1.17%
2017	177	−2.22%
2023	161	−1.57%
Source: INSEE

== See also ==
- Communes of the Aube department
