= Viviers-sur-Artaut =

Commune in Grand Est, France

- Commune
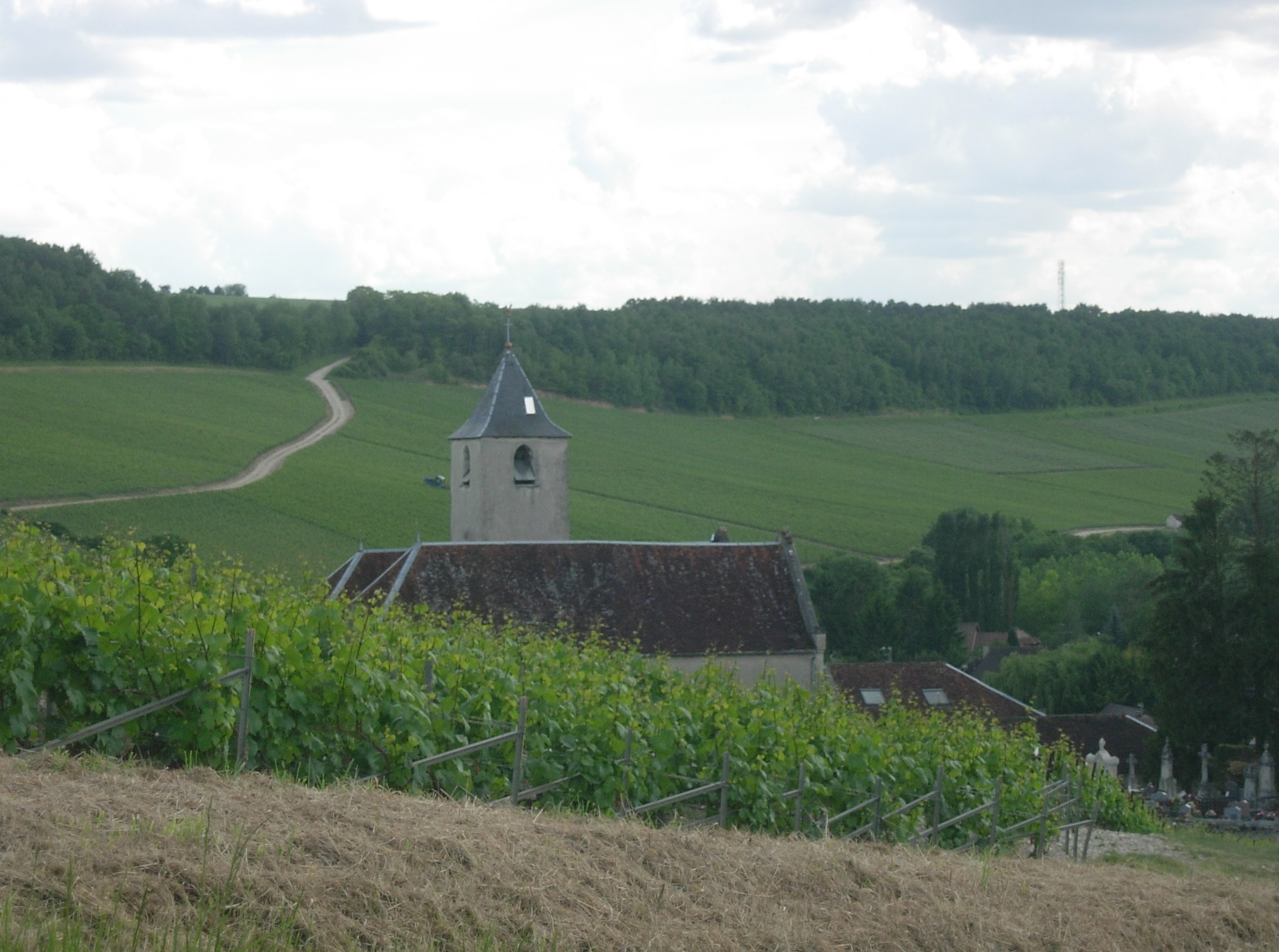
- The church in Viviers-sur-Artaut
- Location of Viviers-sur-Artaut
- Location within France Location within Grand Est
- Coordinates: 48°05′46″N 4°29′52″E
- Country: France
- Region: Grand Est
- Department: Aube
- Arrondissement: Troyes
- Canton: Bar-sur-Seine
- Intercommunality: Barséquanais en Champagne

Government
  - Mayor (2020–2026): Michel Cornet
- Area^{1}: 6.04 km^{2} (2.33 sq mi)
- Elevation: 320 m (1,050 ft)
- Population (2023): 119
  - Density: 19.7/km^{2} (51.0/sq mi)
- Time zone: UTC+01:00 (CET)
  - Summer (DST): UTC+02:00 (CEST)
- INSEE/Postal code: 10439 /10110
- ^{1} French Land Register data, which excludes lakes, ponds, glaciers > 1 km^{2} (0.386 sq mi or 247 acres) and river estuaries.

Viviers-sur-Artaut (French pronunciation: [vivje syʁ aʁto]) is a commune in the Aube department in north-central France.

== Population ==
Historical population
Year	Pop.	±% p.a.
1968	98	—
1975	112	+1.93%
1982	116	+0.50%
1990	126	+1.04%
1999	125	−0.09%
2007	116	−0.93%
2012	115	−0.17%
2017	128	+2.17%
2023	119	−1.21%
Source: INSEE

== See also ==
- Communes of the Aube department
