= Chauffour-lès-Bailly =

Commune in Grand Est, France

- Commune
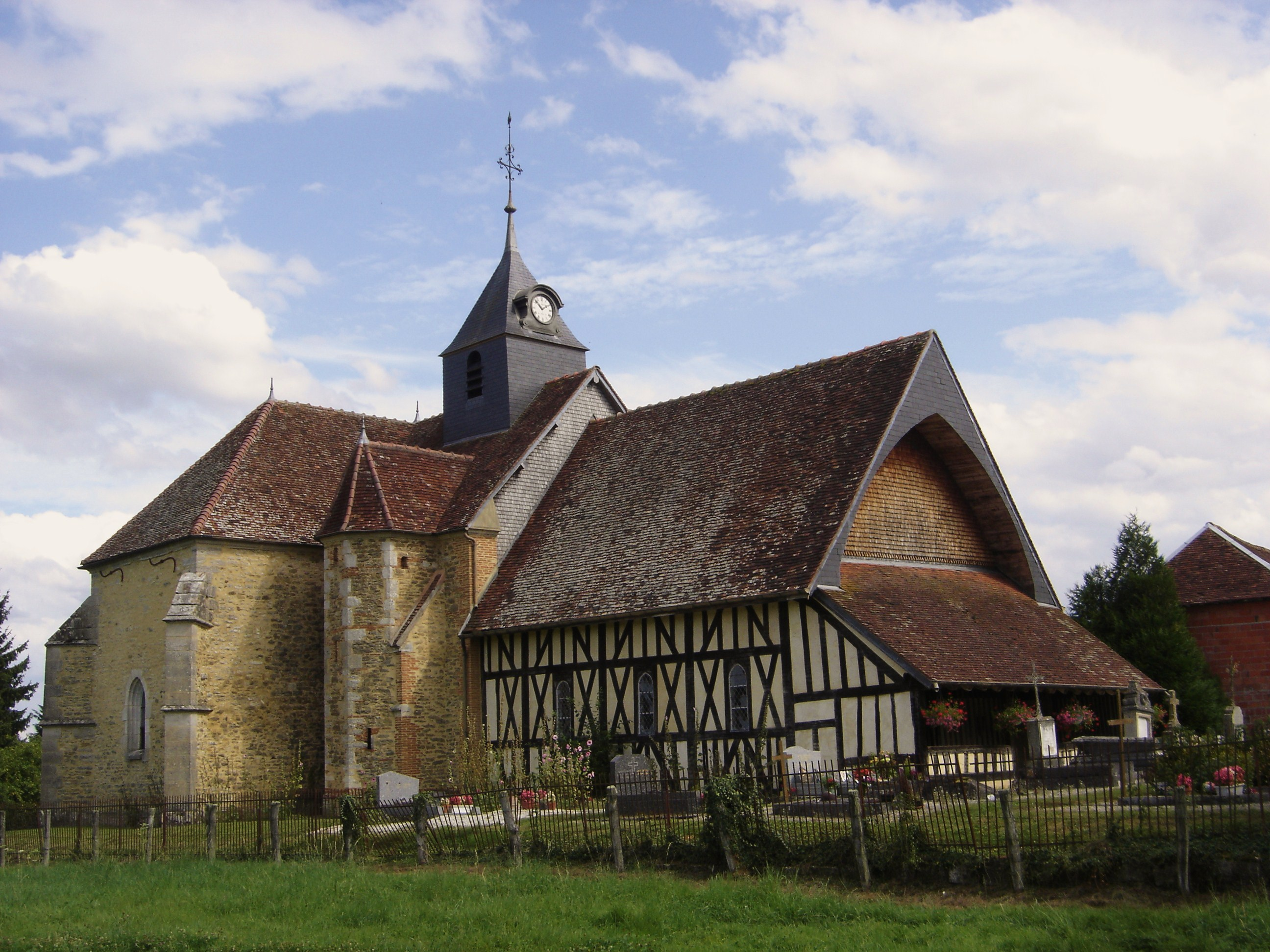
- The church in Chauffour-lès-Bailly
- Location of Chauffour-lès-Bailly
- Location within France Location within Grand Est
- Coordinates: 48°11′50″N 4°19′47″E
- Country: France
- Region: Grand Est
- Department: Aube
- Arrondissement: Troyes
- Canton: Bar-sur-Seine

Government
  - Mayor (2020–2026): Alexandra Jezequel
- Area^{1}: 19.01 km^{2} (7.34 sq mi)
- Elevation: 137 m (449 ft)
- Population (2023): 129
  - Density: 6.79/km^{2} (17.6/sq mi)
- Time zone: UTC+01:00 (CET)
  - Summer (DST): UTC+02:00 (CEST)
- INSEE/Postal code: 10092 /10110
- ^{1} French Land Register data, which excludes lakes, ponds, glaciers > 1 km^{2} (0.386 sq mi or 247 acres) and river estuaries.

Chauffour-lès-Bailly (French pronunciation: [ʃofuʁ lɛ baji]) is a commune in the Aube department in north-central France.

== Population ==
Historical population
Year	Pop.	±% p.a.
1968	104	—
1975	97	−0.99%
1982	91	−0.91%
1990	101	+1.31%
1999	94	−0.79%
2007	111	+2.10%
2012	121	+1.74%
2017	122	+0.16%
2023	129	+0.93%
Source: INSEE

== See also ==
- Communes of the Aube department
- Parc naturel régional de la Forêt d'Orient
