= Courteron =

Commune in Grand Est, France

- Commune
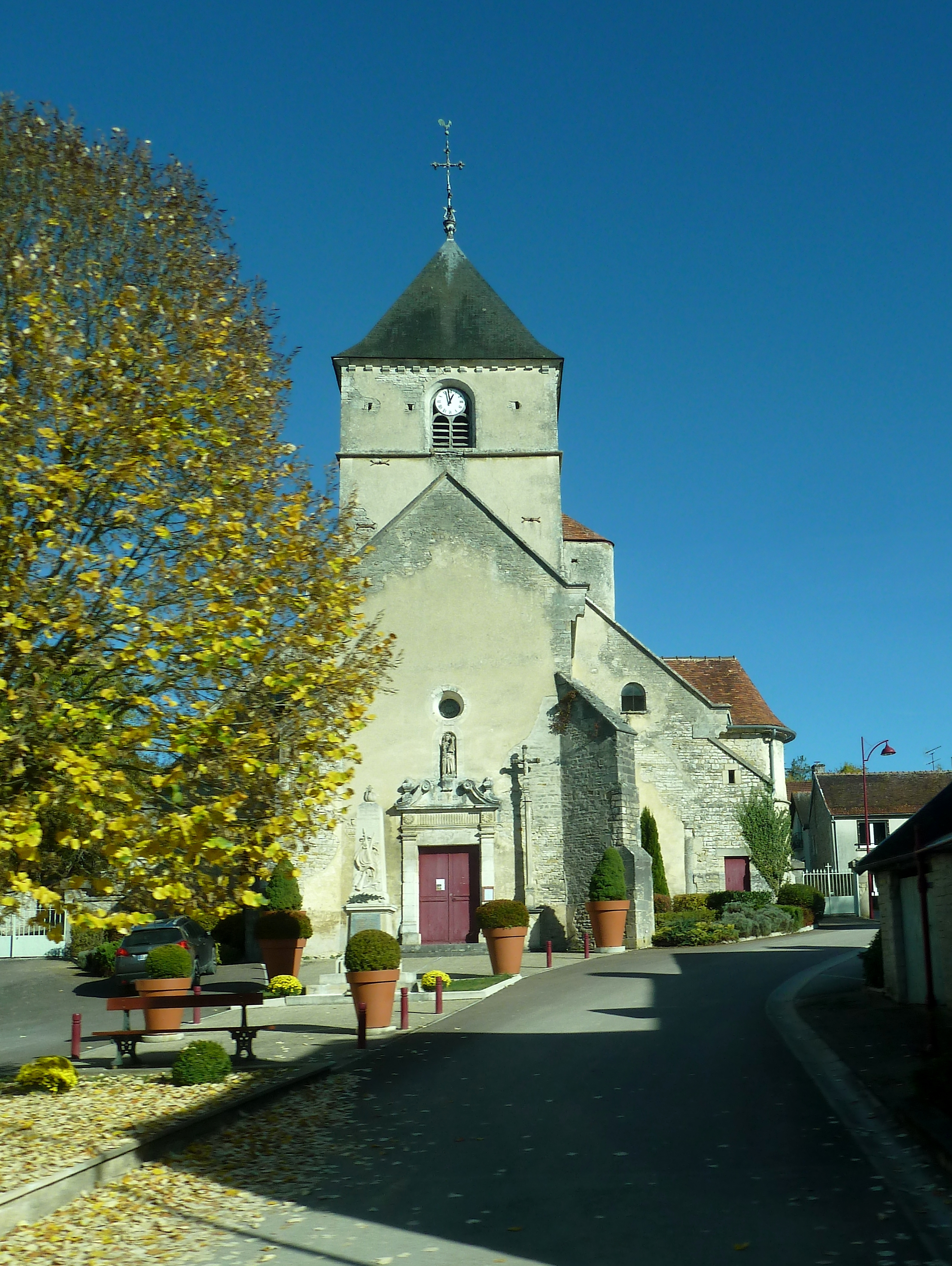
- The church in Courteron
- Location of Courteron
- Location within France Location within Grand Est
- Coordinates: 48°01′13″N 4°26′47″E
- Country: France
- Region: Grand Est
- Department: Aube
- Arrondissement: Troyes
- Canton: Bar-sur-Seine

Government
  - Mayor (2020–2026): Gérard Gillot
- Area^{1}: 10.33 km^{2} (3.99 sq mi)
- Elevation: 179 m (587 ft)
- Population (2023): 99
  - Density: 9.6/km^{2} (25/sq mi)
- Time zone: UTC+01:00 (CET)
  - Summer (DST): UTC+02:00 (CEST)
- INSEE/Postal code: 10111 /10250
- ^{1} French Land Register data, which excludes lakes, ponds, glaciers > 1 km^{2} (0.386 sq mi or 247 acres) and river estuaries.

Courteron (French pronunciation: [kuʁtəʁɔ̃]) is a commune in the Aube department in north-central France.

== Population ==
Historical population
Year	Pop.	±% p.a.
1968	154	—
1975	130	−2.39%
1982	149	+1.97%
1990	149	+0.00%
1999	136	−1.01%
2007	120	−1.55%
2012	114	−1.02%
2017	105	−1.63%
2023	99	−0.98%
Source: INSEE

== See also ==
- Communes of the Aube department
