= Saint-Usage, Aube =

Commune in Grand Est, France

Saint-Usage
- Commune
- Coat of arms
- Location of Saint-Usage
- Location within France Location within Grand Est
- Coordinates: 48°06′03″N 4°36′38″E
- Country: France
- Region: Grand Est
- Department: Aube
- Arrondissement: Troyes
- Canton: Bar-sur-Seine

Government
  - Mayor (2020–2026): Nathalie Joly
- Area^{1}: 16.3 km^{2} (6.3 sq mi)
- Elevation: 310 m (1,020 ft)
- Population (2023): 68
  - Density: 4.2/km^{2} (11/sq mi)
- Time zone: UTC+01:00 (CET)
  - Summer (DST): UTC+02:00 (CEST)
- INSEE/Postal code: 10364 /10360
- ^{1} French Land Register data, which excludes lakes, ponds, glaciers > 1 km^{2} (0.386 sq mi or 247 acres) and river estuaries.

Saint-Usage (French pronunciation: [sɛ̃.t‿yzaʒ]) is a commune in the Aube department in north-central France.

== Population ==
Historical population
Year	Pop.	±% p.a.
1968	110	—
1975	110	+0.00%
1982	98	−1.64%
1990	86	−1.62%
1999	88	+0.26%
2007	86	−0.29%
2012	84	−0.47%
2017	76	−1.98%
2023	68	−1.84%
Source: INSEE

== See also ==
- Communes of the Aube department
