= Rumilly-lès-Vaudes =

Commune in Grand Est, France

- Commune
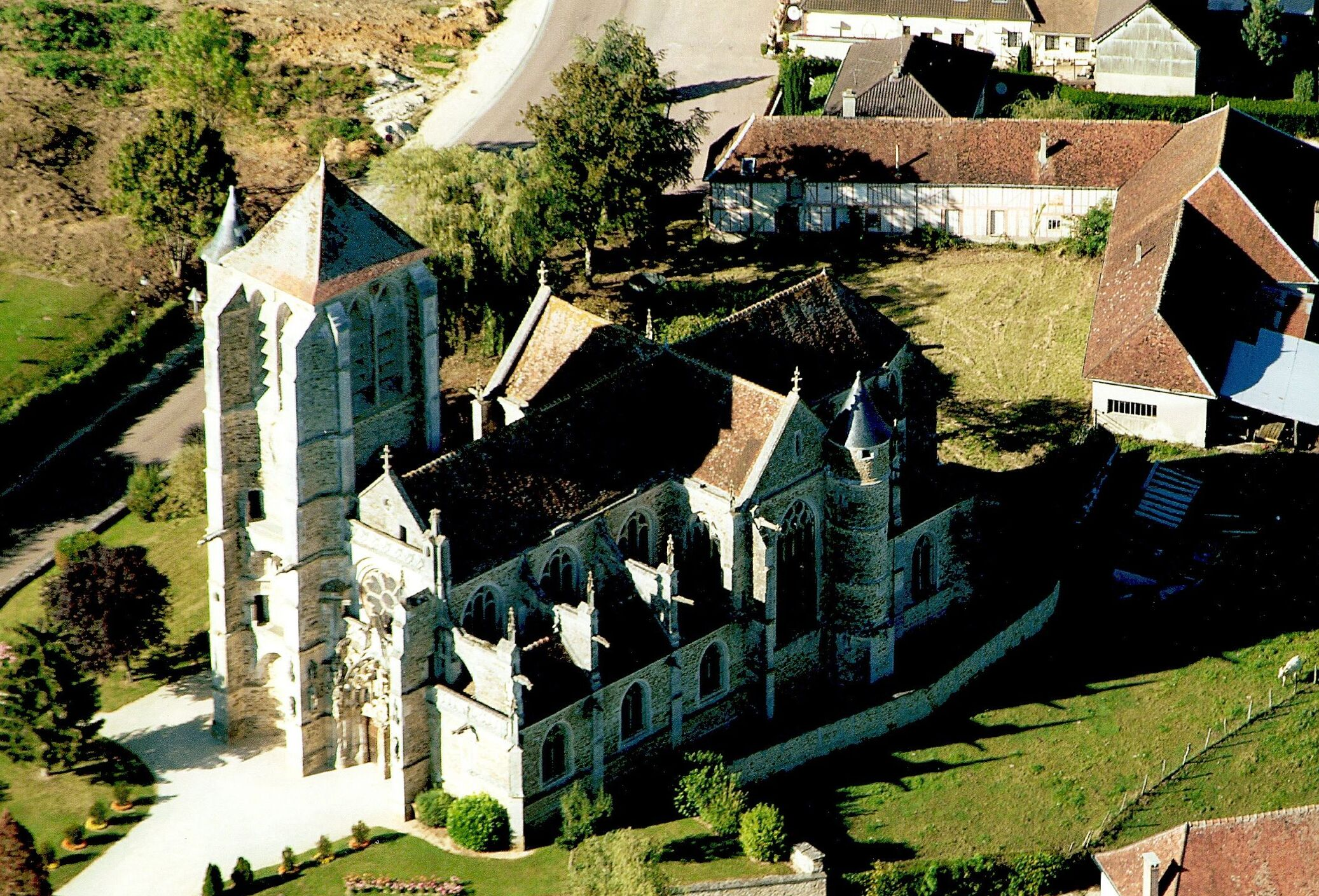
- The church in Rumilly-lès-Vaudes

- Coat of arms
- Location of Rumilly-lès-Vaudes
- Location within France Location within Grand Est
- Coordinates: 48°08′37″N 4°13′02″E
- Country: France
- Region: Grand Est
- Department: Aube
- Arrondissement: Troyes
- Canton: Bar-sur-Seine

Government
  - Mayor (2020–2026): Brigitte Girard
- Area^{1}: 42.38 km^{2} (16.36 sq mi)
- Elevation: 136 m (446 ft)
- Population (2023): 564
  - Density: 13.3/km^{2} (34.5/sq mi)
- Time zone: UTC+01:00 (CET)
  - Summer (DST): UTC+02:00 (CEST)
- INSEE/Postal code: 10331 /10260
- ^{1} French Land Register data, which excludes lakes, ponds, glaciers > 1 km^{2} (0.386 sq mi or 247 acres) and river estuaries.

Rumilly-lès-Vaudes (French pronunciation: [ʁymiji lɛ vod], literally Rumilly near Vaudes) is a commune in the Aube department in north-central France.

== Population ==
Historical population
Year	Pop.	±% p.a.
1968	471	—
1975	459	−0.37%
1982	485	+0.79%
1990	475	−0.26%
1999	484	+0.21%
2007	462	−0.58%
2012	490	+1.18%
2017	542	+2.04%
2023	564	+0.67%
Source: INSEE

== See also ==
- Communes of the Aube department
