= Chappes, Aube =

Commune in Grand Est, France

Chappes
- Commune
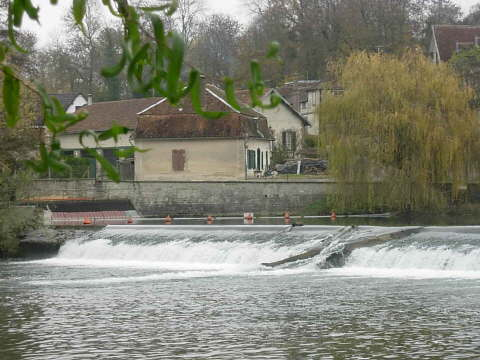
- The River Seine in Chappes

- Coat of arms
- Location of Chappes
- Location within France Location within Grand Est
- Coordinates: 48°10′01″N 4°14′49″E
- Country: France
- Region: Grand Est
- Department: Aube
- Arrondissement: Troyes
- Canton: Bar-sur-Seine
- Intercommunality: CC du Barséquanais en Champagne

Government
  - Mayor (2020–2026): Claudie Odille
- Area^{1}: 9.75 km^{2} (3.76 sq mi)
- Elevation: 180 m (590 ft)
- Highest elevation: 182 m (597 ft)
- Lowest elevation: 128 m (420 ft)
- Population (2023): 360
  - Density: 37/km^{2} (96/sq mi)
- Time zone: UTC+01:00 (CET)
  - Summer (DST): UTC+02:00 (CEST)
- INSEE/Postal code: 10083 /10260
- ^{1} French Land Register data, which excludes lakes, ponds, glaciers > 1 km^{2} (0.386 sq mi or 247 acres) and river estuaries.

Chappes (French pronunciation: [ʃap]) is a rural commune in the Aube department in north-central France. It is on the Seine river upstream of Troyes.

== Population ==
Historical population
Year	Pop.	±% p.a.
1968	249	—
1975	285	+1.95%
1982	277	−0.41%
1990	280	+0.13%
1999	258	−0.91%
2007	306	+2.16%
2012	289	−1.14%
2017	322	+2.19%
2023	360	+1.88%
Source: INSEE

== See also ==
- Communes of the Aube department
