= Courtenot =

Commune in Grand Est, France

- Commune
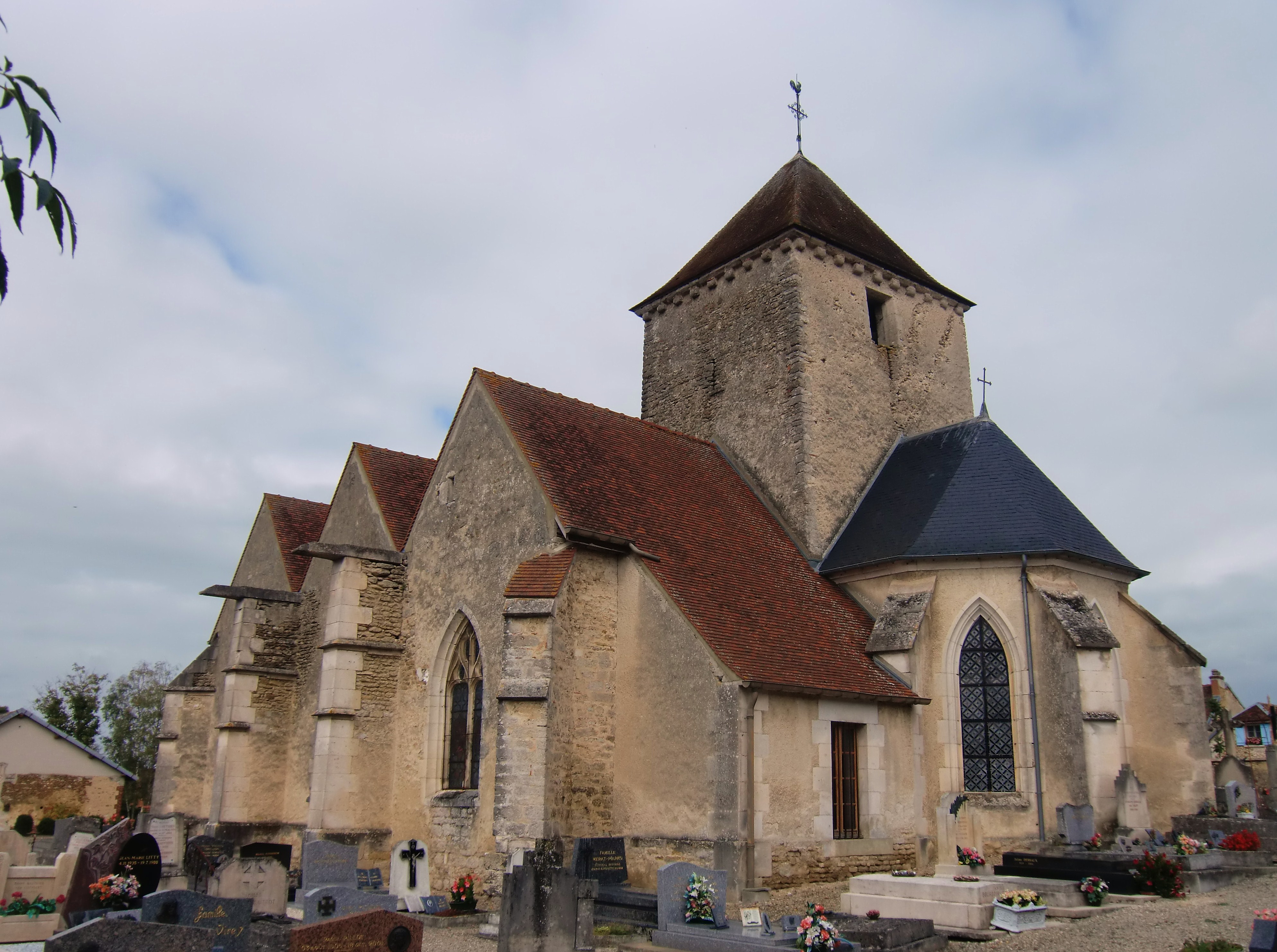
- The church in Courtenot
- Location of Courtenot
- Location within France Location within Grand Est
- Coordinates: 48°08′59″N 4°18′16″E
- Country: France
- Region: Grand Est
- Department: Aube
- Arrondissement: Troyes
- Canton: Bar-sur-Seine

Government
  - Mayor (2020–2026): Régis Marion
- Area^{1}: 8.37 km^{2} (3.23 sq mi)
- Elevation: 142 m (466 ft)
- Highest elevation: 206 m (676 ft)
- Lowest elevation: 137 m (449 ft)
- Population (2023): 211
  - Density: 25.2/km^{2} (65.3/sq mi)
- Time zone: UTC+01:00 (CET)
  - Summer (DST): UTC+02:00 (CEST)
- INSEE/Postal code: 10109 /10260
- ^{1} French Land Register data, which excludes lakes, ponds, glaciers > 1 km^{2} (0.386 sq mi or 247 acres) and river estuaries.

Courtenot (French pronunciation: [kuʁtəno]) is a commune in the Aube department in north-central France.

== Population ==
Historical population
| Year | Pop. | ±% p.a. |
|---|---|---|
| 1968 | 189 | — |
| 1975 | 200 | +0.81% |
| 1982 | 171 | −2.21% |
| 1990 | 224 | +3.43% |
| 1999 | 242 | +0.86% |
| 2007 | 216 | −1.41% |
| 2012 | 235 | +1.70% |
| 2017 | 231 | −0.34% |
| 2023 | 211 | −1.50% |
Source: INSEE

== See also ==
- Communes of the Aube department
