= Landreville =

Commune in Grand Est, France

- Commune
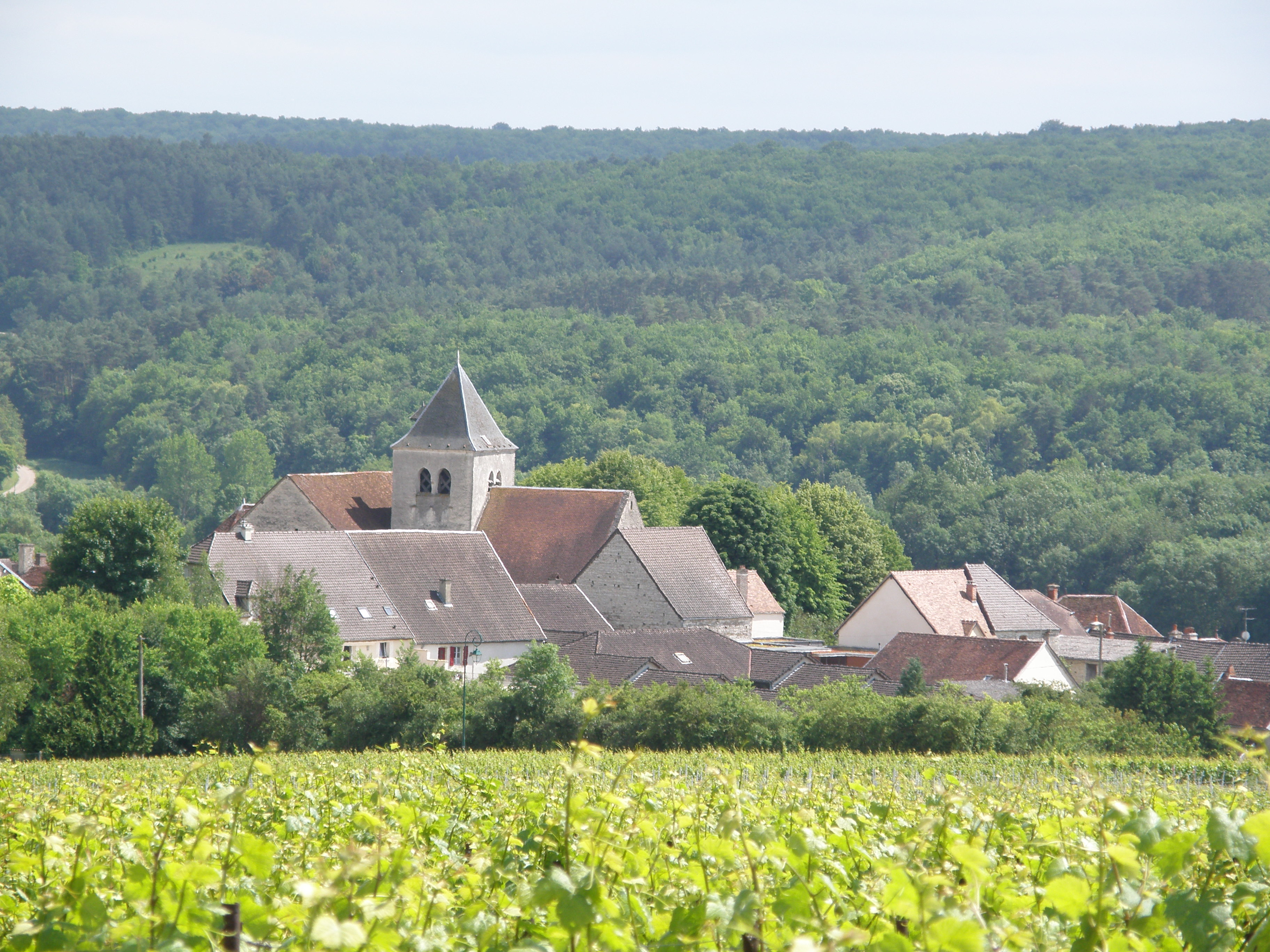
- A general view of Landreville
- Location of Landreville
- Location within France Location within Grand Est
- Coordinates: 48°04′22″N 4°28′28″E
- Country: France
- Region: Grand Est
- Department: Aube
- Arrondissement: Troyes
- Canton: Bar-sur-Seine

Government
  - Mayor (2020–2026): Didier Thibaut
- Area^{1}: 14.2 km^{2} (5.5 sq mi)
- Elevation: 175 m (574 ft)
- Population (2023): 395
  - Density: 27.8/km^{2} (72.0/sq mi)
- Time zone: UTC+01:00 (CET)
  - Summer (DST): UTC+02:00 (CEST)
- INSEE/Postal code: 10187 /10110
- ^{1} French Land Register data, which excludes lakes, ponds, glaciers > 1 km^{2} (0.386 sq mi or 247 acres) and river estuaries.

Landreville (French pronunciation: [lɑ̃dʁəvil]) is a commune in the Aube department in north-central France.

== Population ==
Historical population
Year	Pop.	±% p.a.
1968	541	—
1975	565	+0.62%
1982	494	−1.90%
1990	534	+0.98%
1999	544	+0.21%
2007	528	−0.37%
2012	520	−0.30%
2017	441	−3.24%
2023	395	−1.82%
Source: INSEE

== See also ==
- Communes of the Aube department
