= Poligny, Aube =

Commune in Grand Est, France

Poligny
- Commune
- Location of Poligny
- Location within France Location within Grand Est
- Coordinates: 48°10′30″N 4°20′28″E
- Country: France
- Region: Grand Est
- Department: Aube
- Arrondissement: Troyes
- Canton: Bar-sur-Seine

Government
  - Mayor (2020–2026): Laurent Ratinet
- Area^{1}: 1.59 km^{2} (0.61 sq mi)
- Elevation: 153 m (502 ft)
- Population (2023): 56
  - Density: 35/km^{2} (91/sq mi)
- Time zone: UTC+01:00 (CET)
  - Summer (DST): UTC+02:00 (CEST)
- INSEE/Postal code: 10294 /10110
- ^{1} French Land Register data, which excludes lakes, ponds, glaciers > 1 km^{2} (0.386 sq mi or 247 acres) and river estuaries.

Poligny (French pronunciation: [pɔliɲi]) is a commune in the Aube department in north-central France.

== Population ==
Historical population
Year	Pop.	±% p.a.
1968	42	—
1975	47	+1.62%
1982	36	−3.74%
1990	32	−1.46%
1999	28	−1.47%
2007	61	+10.22%
2012	70	+2.79%
2017	64	−1.78%
2023	56	−2.20%
Source: INSEE

== See also ==
- Communes of the Aube department
