= Buxeuil, Aube =

Commune in Grand Est, France

Buxeuil
- Commune
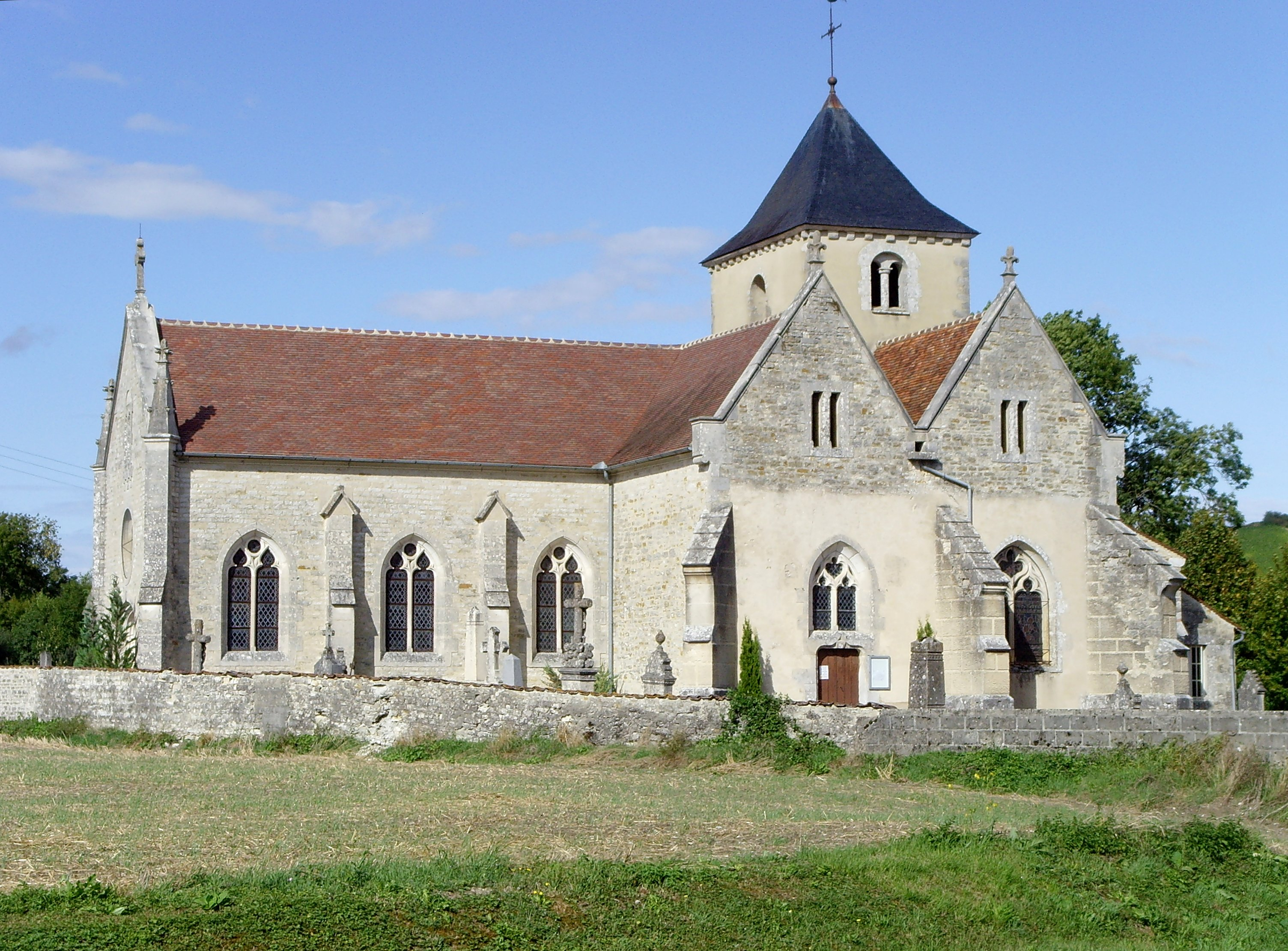
- The church in Buxeuil

- Coat of arms
- Location of Buxeuil
- Location within France Location within Grand Est
- Coordinates: 48°03′19″N 4°23′50″E
- Country: France
- Region: Grand Est
- Department: Aube
- Arrondissement: Troyes
- Canton: Bar-sur-Seine

Government
  - Mayor (2020–2026): Jean-Claude Ruelle
- Area^{1}: 4.43 km^{2} (1.71 sq mi)
- Elevation: 167 m (548 ft)
- Highest elevation: 312 m (1,024 ft)
- Lowest elevation: 160 m (520 ft)
- Population (2023): 109
  - Density: 24.6/km^{2} (63.7/sq mi)
- Time zone: UTC+01:00 (CET)
  - Summer (DST): UTC+02:00 (CEST)
- INSEE/Postal code: 10068 /10110
- ^{1} French Land Register data, which excludes lakes, ponds, glaciers > 1 km^{2} (0.386 sq mi or 247 acres) and river estuaries.

Buxeuil is a commune in the Aube department in north-central France. Buxeuil is one of the smallest communes in the Côte des Bar region of southern Champagne.

== History ==
The area around Buxeuil was settled by Celtic tribes in the antiquity. The name derives from the Latin and means literally field of the box trees (buxus=box tree; ielas=field). In the end of the 19c Buxeuil became a charming little village with an own town hall. In 1911 the Champagne Riot caused much turmoil, but the village could maintain the Appellation Champagne.

== Population ==
Historical population
Year	Pop.	±% p.a.
1968	149	—
1975	153	+0.38%
1982	149	−0.38%
1990	153	+0.33%
1999	145	−0.59%
2007	142	−0.26%
2012	143	+0.14%
2017	130	−1.89%
2023	109	−2.89%
Source: INSEE

== Sights ==
Buxeuil's is home to a village church built in the 13th to 16th centuries. Other sights are the two ancient wash houses and the old pressoir of Champagne Moutard on Grande Rue. Its best known attractions are the visitor's offices of Champagne Moutard and Champagne Gruet as well as the reception rooms of many smaller champagne producers.

== See also ==
- French wine
- Champagne Riots
- Communes of the Aube department
