= Vaudes =

Commune in Grand Est, France

- Commune
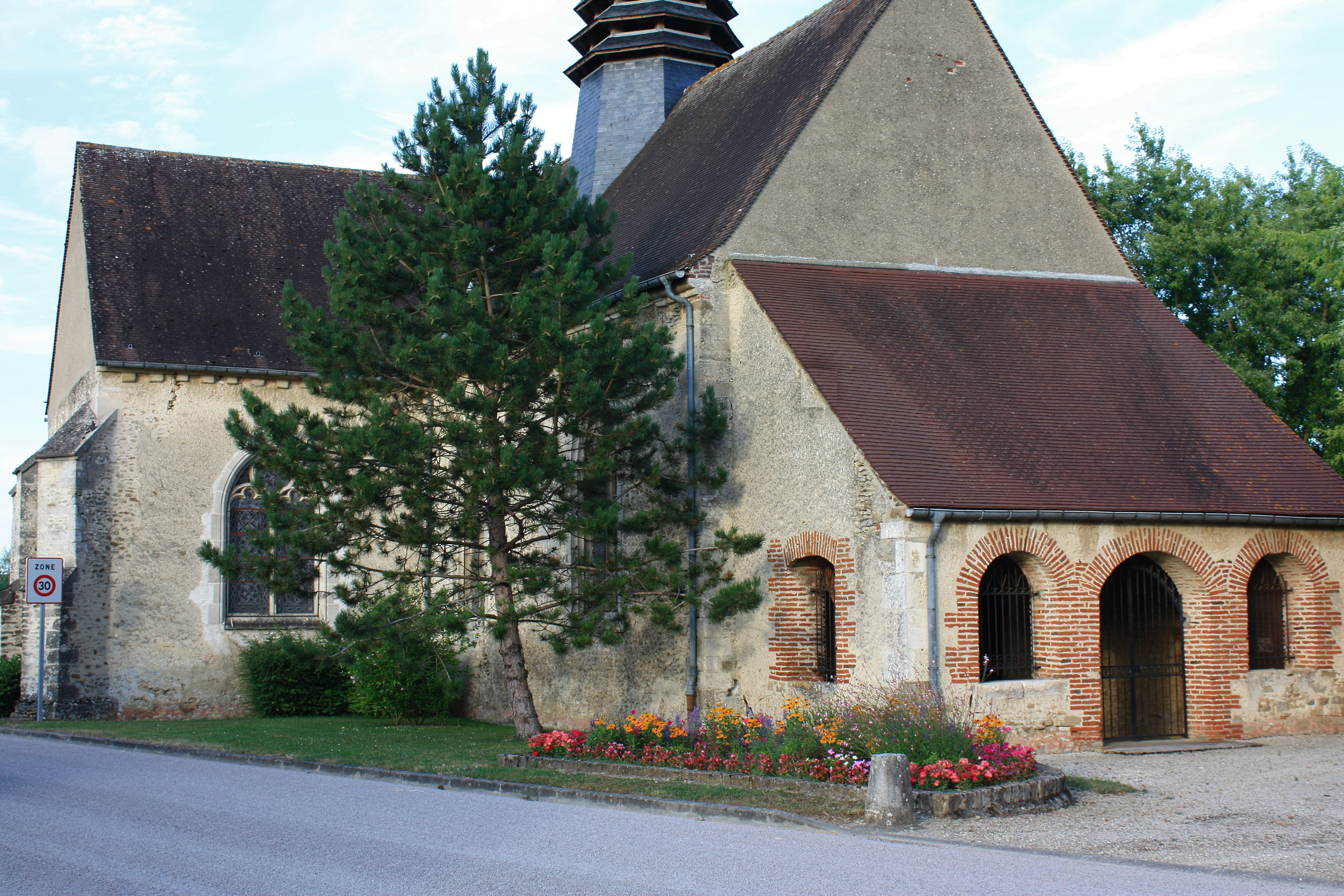
- The church in Vaudes
- Location of Vaudes
- Location within France Location within Grand Est
- Coordinates: 48°10′45″N 4°11′18″E
- Country: France
- Region: Grand Est
- Department: Aube
- Arrondissement: Troyes
- Canton: Bar-sur-Seine

Government
  - Mayor (2024–2026): Olivier Martin-Chaussade
- Area^{1}: 7.57 km^{2} (2.92 sq mi)
- Elevation: 127 m (417 ft)
- Population (2023): 701
  - Density: 92.6/km^{2} (240/sq mi)
- Time zone: UTC+01:00 (CET)
  - Summer (DST): UTC+02:00 (CEST)
- INSEE/Postal code: 10399 /10260
- ^{1} French Land Register data, which excludes lakes, ponds, glaciers > 1 km^{2} (0.386 sq mi or 247 acres) and river estuaries.

Vaudes (French pronunciation: [vod]) is a commune in the Aube department in north-central France.

== Population ==
Historical population
Year	Pop.	±% p.a.
1968	353	—
1975	459	+3.82%
1982	670	+5.55%
1990	626	−0.85%
1999	543	−1.57%
2007	598	+1.21%
2012	684	+2.72%
2017	716	+0.92%
2023	701	−0.35%
Source: INSEE

== See also ==
- Communes of the Aube department
