= Avant-lès-Ramerupt =

Commune in Grand Est, France

- Commune
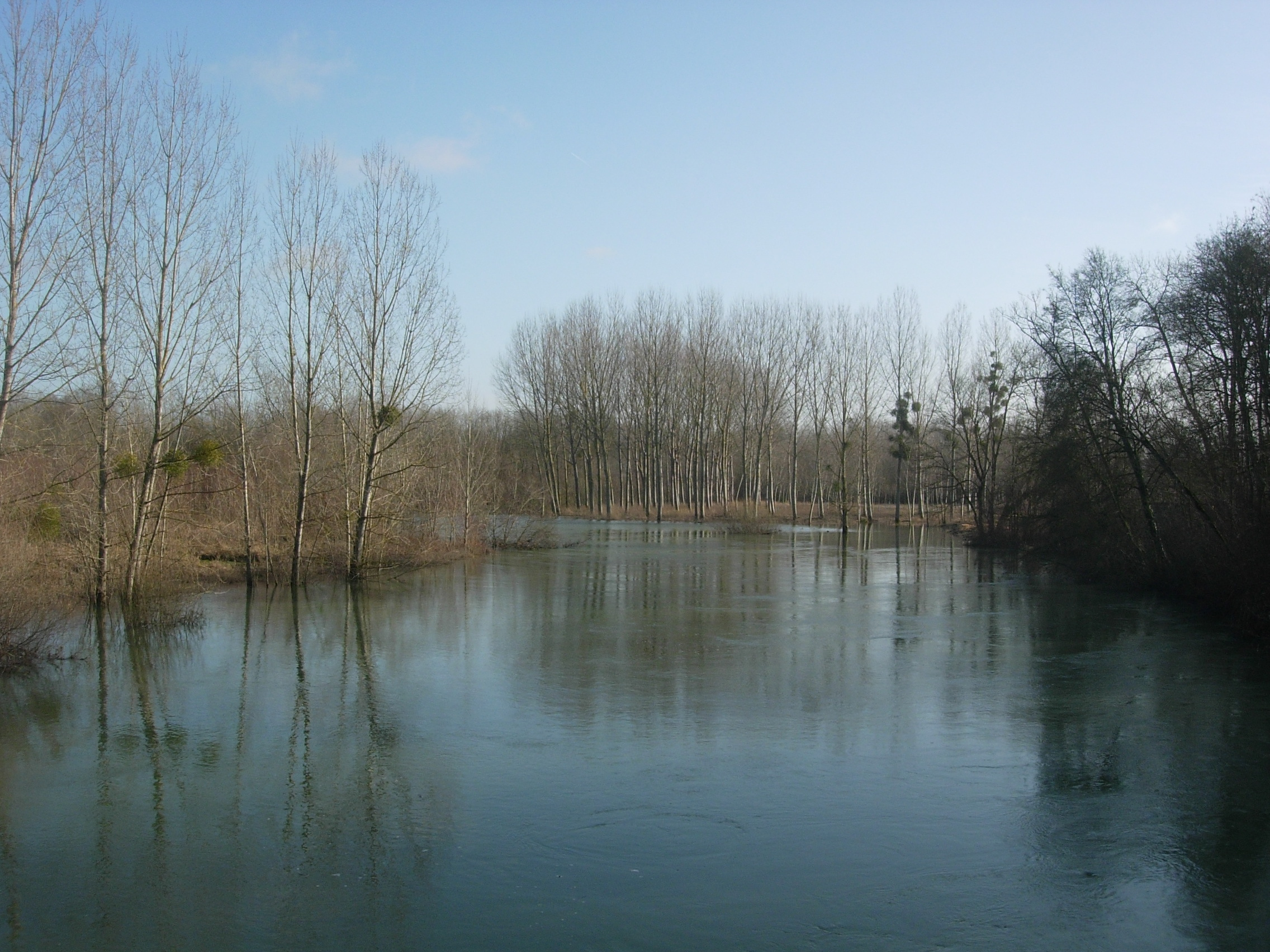
- The river Aube

- Coat of arms
- Location of Avant-lès-Ramerupt
- Location within France Location within Grand Est
- Coordinates: 48°26′56″N 4°17′15″E
- Country: France
- Region: Grand Est
- Department: Aube
- Arrondissement: Troyes
- Canton: Arcis-sur-Aube
- Intercommunality: Forêts, Lacs, Terres en Champagne

Government
  - Mayor (2020–2026): Denis Mailier
- Area^{1}: 20.77 km^{2} (8.02 sq mi)
- Elevation: 117 m (384 ft)
- Population (2023): 160
  - Density: 7.7/km^{2} (20/sq mi)
- Time zone: UTC+01:00 (CET)
  - Summer (DST): UTC+02:00 (CEST)
- INSEE/Postal code: 10021 /10240
- ^{1} French Land Register data, which excludes lakes, ponds, glaciers > 1 km^{2} (0.386 sq mi or 247 acres) and river estuaries.

Avant-lès-Ramerupt (French pronunciation: [avɑ̃ lɛ ʁamʁy], literally Avant near Ramerupt) is a commune in the Aube department in the Grand Est region of north-central France.

== Geography ==
Avant-lès-Ramerupt is located some 30 km north-east of Troyes and 15 km south-east of Arcis-sur-Aube. Access to the commune is by the D5 from Creney-près-Troyes in the south-west which passes through the village and continues north-east to join the D441 near Coclois. The D99 passes through the north-west of the commune as it goes from Charmont-sous-Barbuise to Ramerupt. The D107 links the D99 to the village through Mesnil-Lettre. The D48 comes from Nogent-sur-Aube in the north-east to the village then continues south to Longsols. The commune is U-shaped oriented north-east with the village in the eastern arm of the U. The commune is entirely farmland.

The Arcot rises just north of the village and flows south-east to join the Longsols just south of the commune.

== Administration ==
List of Successive Mayors

From	To	Name
	1857	Maufroy
2001	2026	Denis Mailier

== Demography ==
Historical population

Year	Pop.	±% p.a.
1793	292	—
1821	250	−0.55%
1846	248	−0.03%
1872	230	−0.29%
1901	158	−1.29%
1926	163	+0.12%
1946	168	+0.15%
1962	168	+0.00%
1968	166	−0.20%

Year	Pop.	±% p.a.
1975	162	−0.35%
1982	160	−0.18%
1990	156	−0.32%
1999	166	+0.69%
2007	149	−1.34%
2012	152	+0.40%
2017	157	+0.65%
2023	160	+0.32%

Source: EHESS and INSEE

== Culture and heritage ==
=== Civil heritage ===
- The War Memorial
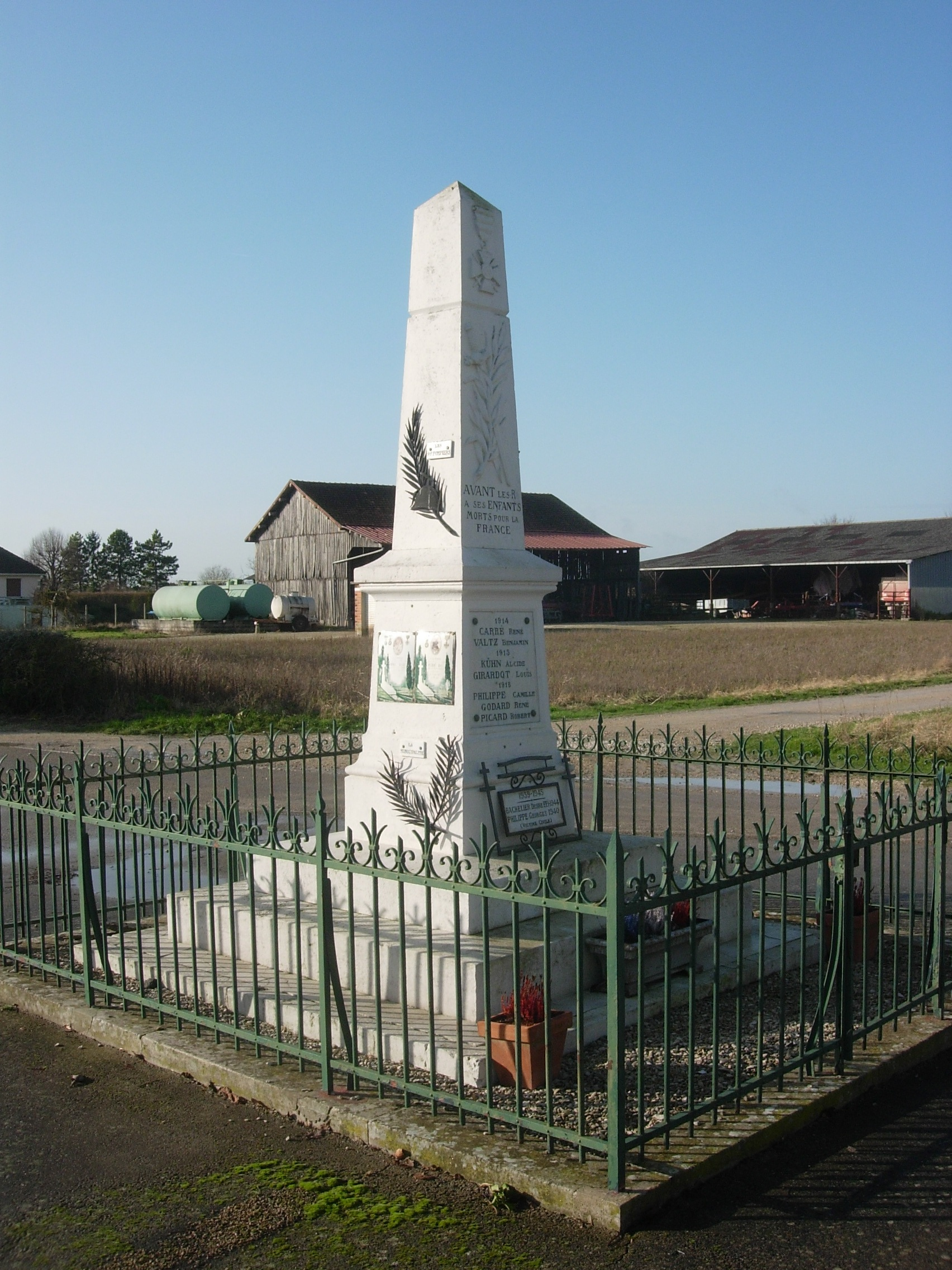
The War Memorial.

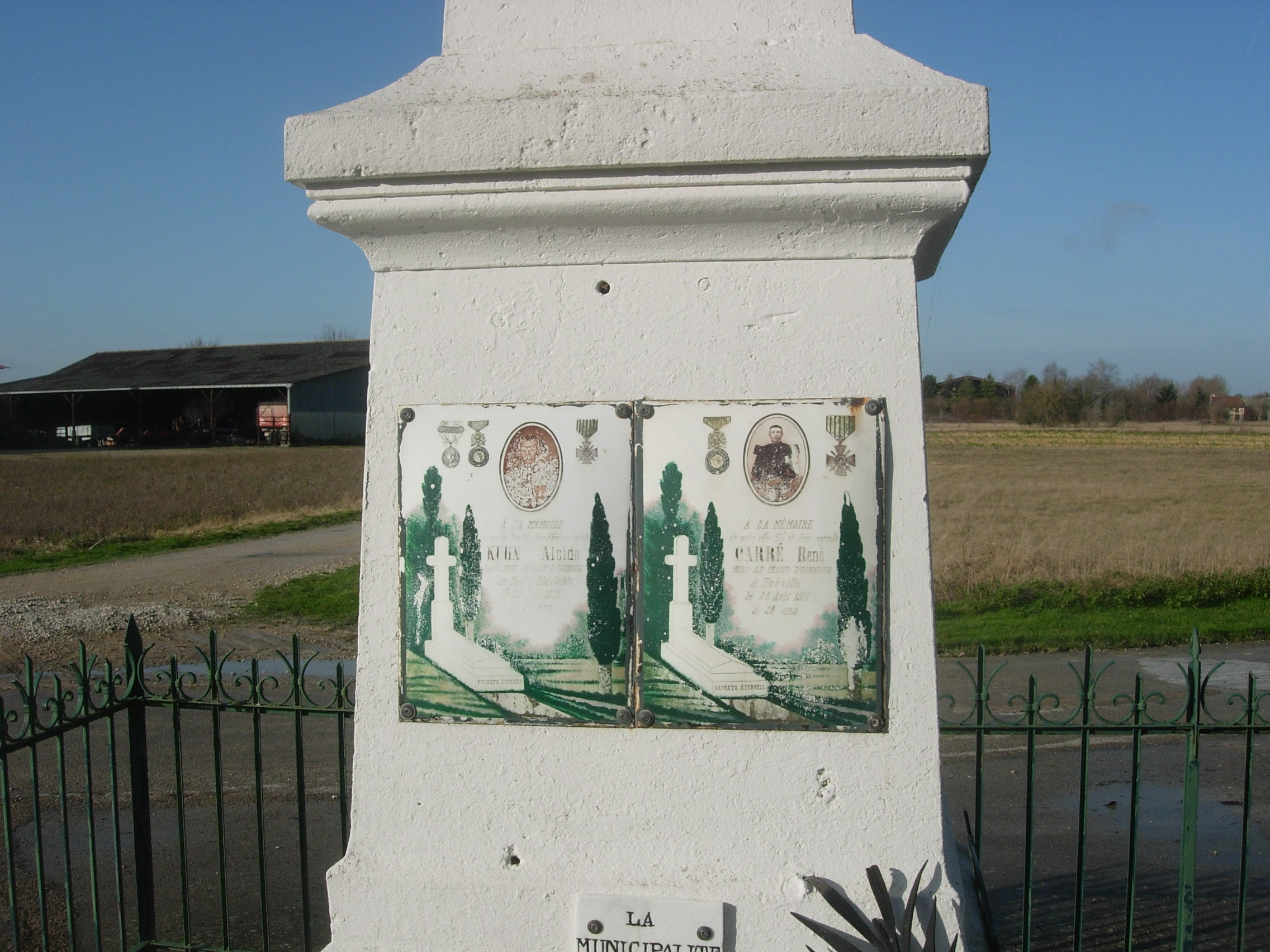
Detail of plaques on the War Memorial.

=== Religious heritage ===
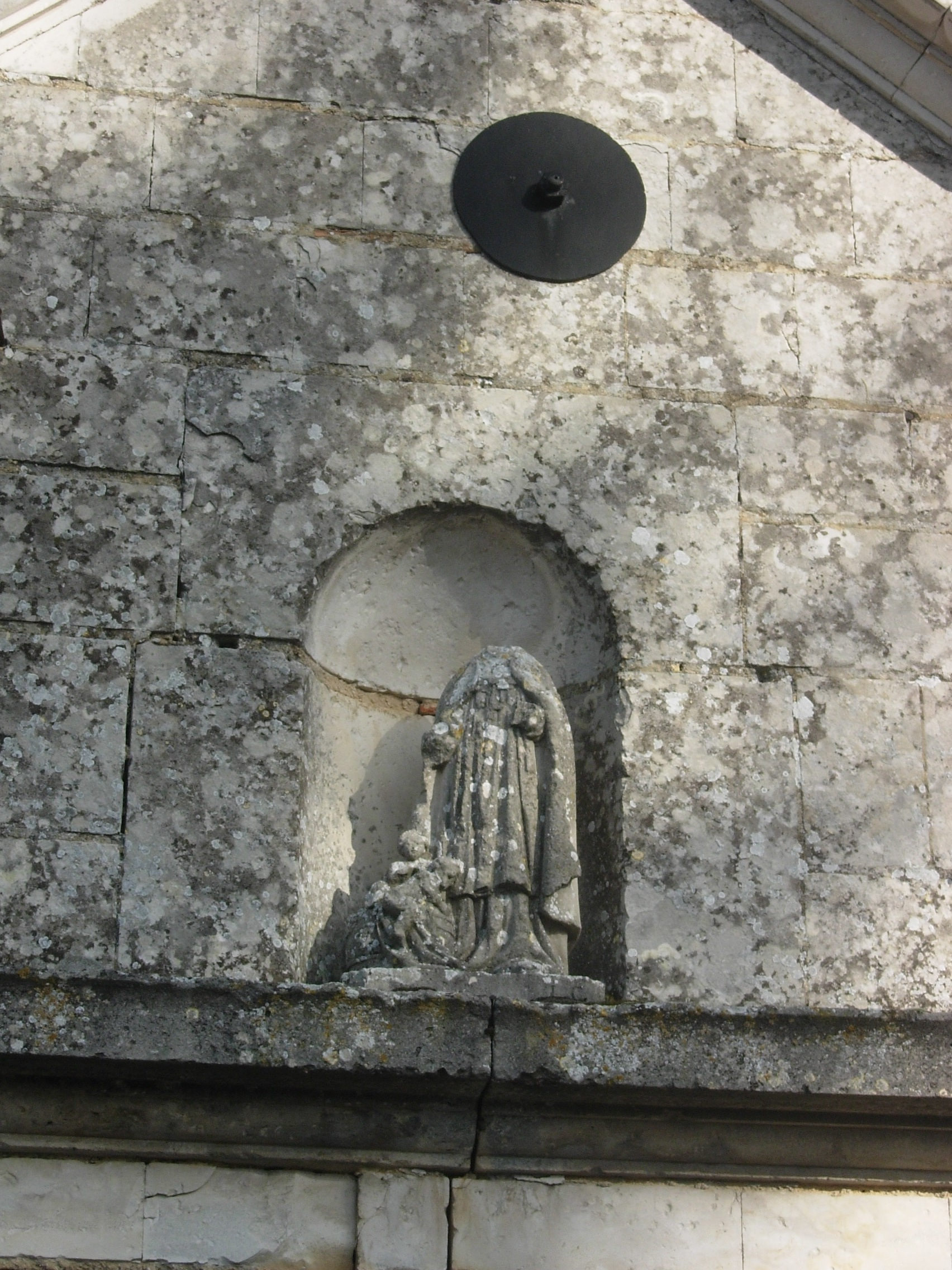
Sculpture in a niche of the church

The commune has one religious building that is registered as an historical monument: The Church of Saint Denis (12th century). From the east its Apse and its Choir are early Gothic, the Transept, the Nave, and the lateral naves were built in the 16th century. The tower dates from about 1200. The lateral naves are covered with a Gabled roof. The building was constructed by the chapter of Pougy.

The Church contains many items that are registered as historical objects:

- A Statuette: Saint Denis (16th century)
- Panelling (17th century)
- A Statue: Virgin and child (16th century)
- A Painted panel: The Nativity (17th century)
- A Statue: Saint Denis (16th century)
- A Statue: Christ on the Cross (16th century)
- A Statue: Saint Abbot (16th century)
- A Statue: Saint John the Baptist (15th century)
- A Statue: Virgin and child (14th century)
- A Group Sculpture: Saint Roch and an Angel (16th century)
- Pieces of the Altar (18th century)
- A Monstrance (19th century)
- A Statue: Religious figure (16th century)
- The Altar (17th century)
- A Niche (17th century)
- Baptismal fonts (16th century)
- Pavement Tiles (16th century)
- A Statue: Saint Éleuthère (16th century)
- A Statue: Saint Rustique (16th century)
- A Retable and Tabernacle on the main altar (17th century)
- A Painting: Assumption (19th century)

== See also ==
- Communes of the Aube department
