= Torcy =

Torcy may refer to several places in France:

== Communes ==
- Torcy, Pas-de-Calais
- Torcy, Saône-et-Loire
- Torcy, Seine-et-Marne
- Torcy-en-Valois, Aisne
- Torcy-et-Pouligny, Côte-d'Or
- Torcy-le-Grand, Aube
- Torcy-le-Grand, Seine-Maritime
- Torcy-le-Petit, Aube
- Torcy-le-Petit, Seine-Maritime

== Other ==
- Arrondissement of Torcy, Seine-et-Marne department
