= Aubeterre =

Commune in Grand Est, France

- Commune
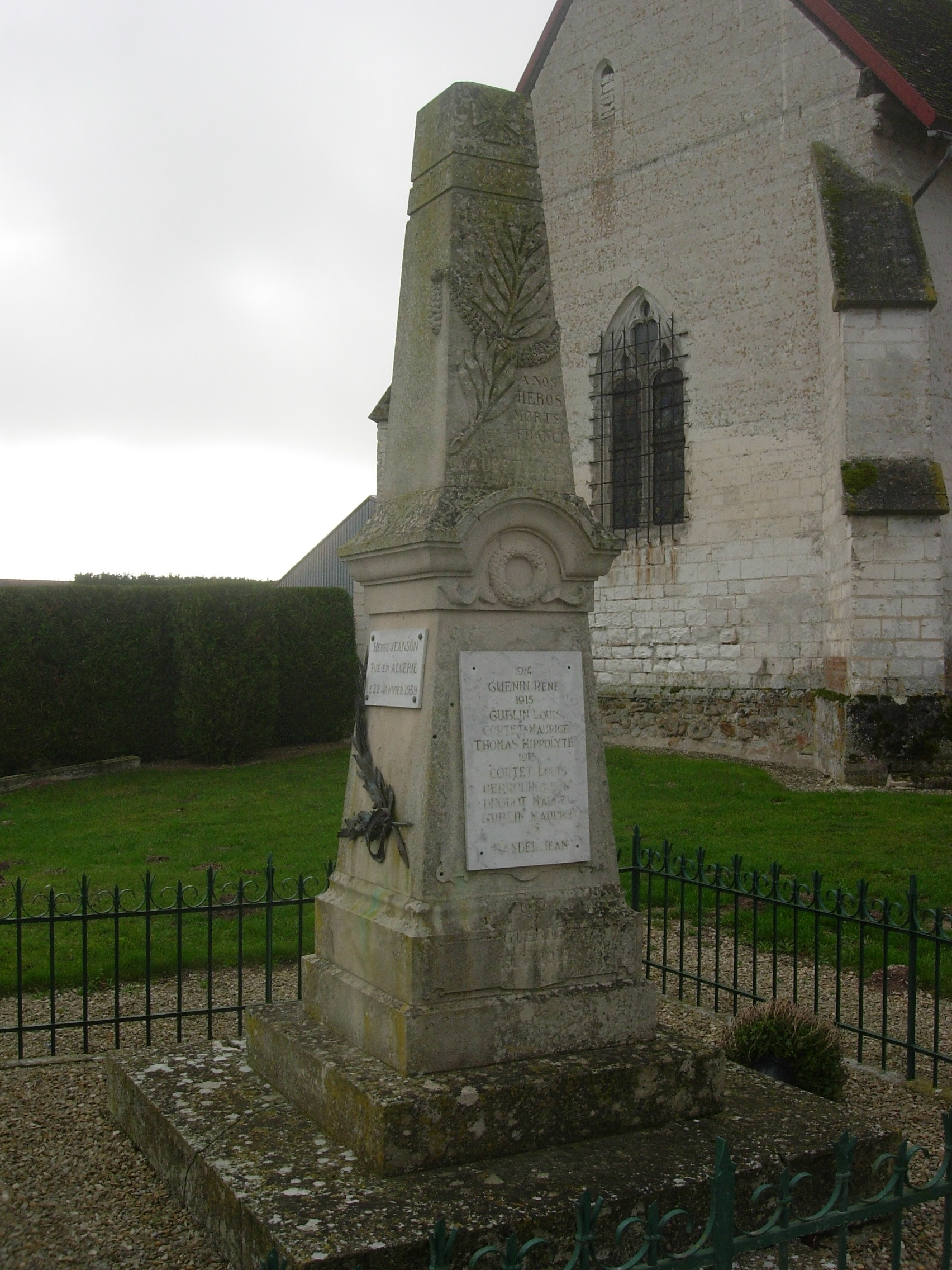
- War memorial
- Location of Aubeterre
- Location within France Location within Grand Est
- Coordinates: 48°25′50″N 4°07′15″E
- Country: France
- Region: Grand Est
- Department: Aube
- Arrondissement: Troyes
- Canton: Arcis-sur-Aube
- Intercommunality: CA Troyes Champagne Métropole

Government
  - Mayor (2020–2026): Jean-Marie Beaussier
- Area^{1}: 11.66 km^{2} (4.50 sq mi)
- Elevation: 124 m (407 ft)
- Population (2023): 398
  - Density: 34.1/km^{2} (88.4/sq mi)
- Time zone: UTC+01:00 (CET)
  - Summer (DST): UTC+02:00 (CEST)
- INSEE/Postal code: 10015 /10150
- ^{1} French Land Register data, which excludes lakes, ponds, glaciers > 1 km^{2} (0.386 sq mi or 247 acres) and river estuaries.

Aubeterre (French pronunciation: [obtɛʁ]) is a commune in the Aube department in the Grand Est region of north-central France.

== Geography ==
Aubeterre is located some 25 km north by north-east of Troyes and 17 km south by south-west of Arcis-sur-Aube. Access to the commune is by the D677 road from Voué in the north passing through the length of the commune and the village and continuing to Feuges in the south. The commune is entirely flat farmland.

The commune is served by the Procars Champagne Bus No. 7 bus from Troyes (bus station) to Arcis-sur-Aube and Mailly-le-Camp and vice versa.

== History ==
Before being called Aubeterre the name of the commune was Alba-Terra. On 1 January 2011 the communes of Aubeterre and Montsuzain integrated into the Community of communes Seine Melda Coteaux. A Primary Elementary School is located in the heart of the village next to City Hall.

== Administration ==
List of Successive Mayors

From	To	Name	Party	Position
/1857		Jobert		
2001		Jean-Marie Beaussier		
2014	2020	François Barthel		
2020	2026	Jean-Marie Beaussier		
15 March 2026		Anthony Peters		

== Demography ==
The inhabitants of the commune are known as Aubeterriens or Aubeterriennes in French.

Historical population

Year	Pop.	±% p.a.
1793	228	—
1821	234	+0.09%
1846	232	−0.03%
1872	222	−0.17%
1901	148	−1.39%
1926	135	−0.37%
1946	115	−0.80%
1962	116	+0.05%
1968	111	−0.73%

Year	Pop.	±% p.a.
1975	110	−0.13%
1982	113	+0.39%
1990	177	+5.77%
1999	167	−0.64%
2007	218	+3.39%
2012	293	+6.09%
2017	357	+4.03%
2023	398	+1.83%

Source: EHESS and INSEE

== Sites and monuments ==
The Church of the Purification of the Virgin dates from the 12th and 15th centuries. The Corbels of the prophets are unusual with their Speech scrolls.

The Church contains many items which are registered as historical objects:

- A Celebrant Chair (18th century)
- Ceramic tiling (13th century)
- A Statue: Saint John the Baptist (16th century)
- Stained glass (16th century)
- A Statuette: Saint Marguerite (disappeared) (16th century)
- A Statue: Virgin and Child (15th century)
- A Statue: Saint Bishop (14th century)
- A Statue: Virgin in prayer (16th century)
- A Bronze Bell (1770)
- A Paten (1819)
- A Chalice (19th century)
- An old door and hinges (16th century)
- Some benches with balustrades (1795)
- A Monumental painting (15th century)
- A Stoup (16th century)
- A Baptismal Font (16th century)
- A Monumental painting (16th century)

== See also ==
- Communes of the Aube department
