= Nozay =

Nozay may refer to the following places in France:

- Nozay, Aube (in north-central France)
- Nozay, Essonne (close to Paris)
- Nozay, Loire-Atlantique (in western France)
