= Torcy-le-Grand =

Torcy-le-Grand may refer to the following places in France:

- Torcy-le-Grand, Aube, a commune in the Aube department
- Torcy-le-Grand, Seine-Maritime, a commune in the Seine-Maritime department
