= Torcy-le-Petit =

Torcy-le-Petit may refer to the following places in France:

- Torcy-le-Petit, Aube, a commune in the Aube department
- Torcy-le-Petit, Seine-Maritime, a commune in the Seine-Maritime department
