= Arrondissement of Troyes =

Coordinates: 48°18′N 4°04′E

Troyes
- Arrondissement
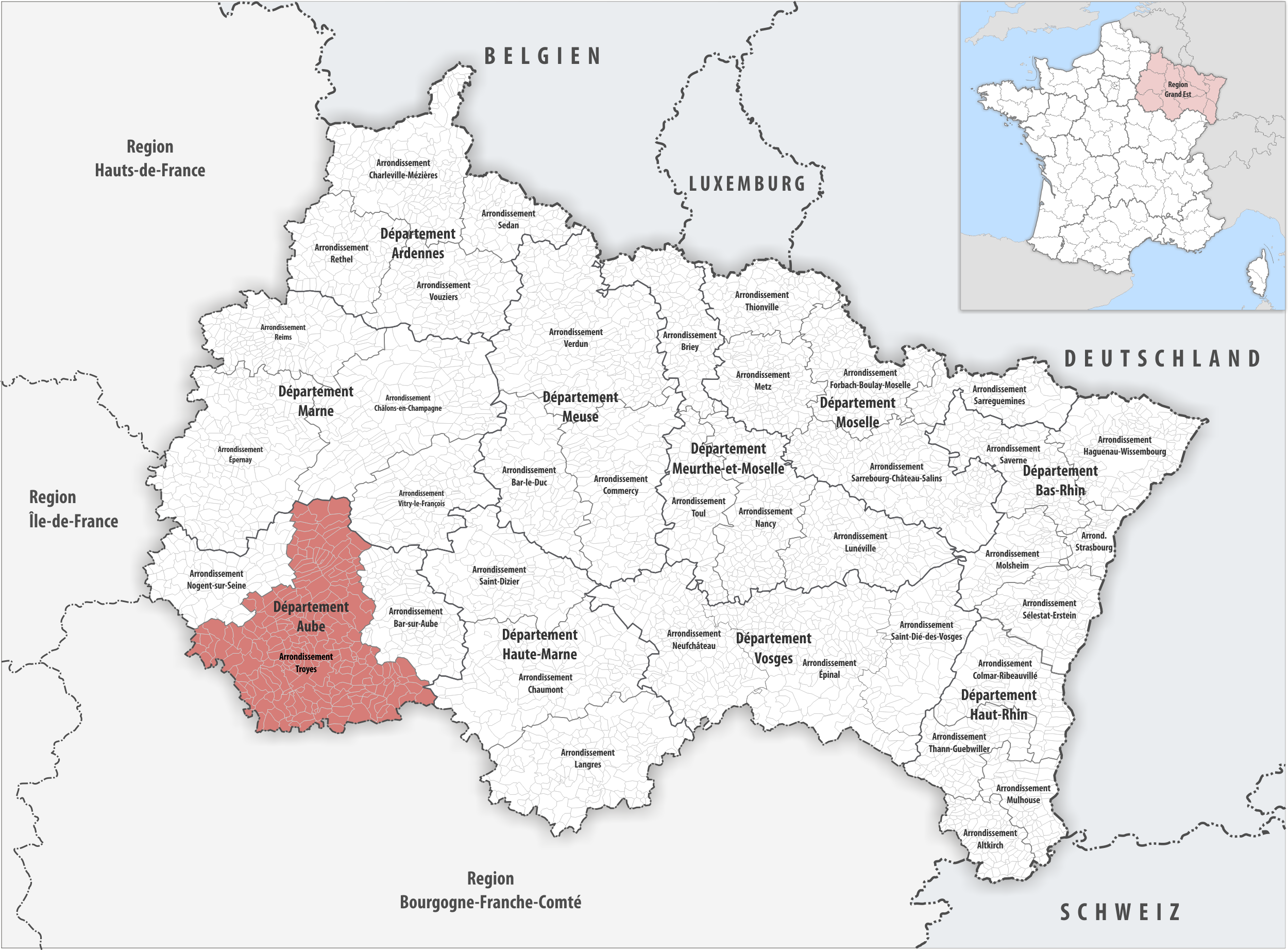
- Location within the region Grand Est
- Country: France
- Region: Grand Est
- Department: Aube
- No. of communes: {{{nbcomm}}}
- Area: 3,540.4 km^{2} (1,367.0 sq mi)
- Population (2023): 230,015
  - Density: 64.969/km^{2} (168.27/sq mi)
- INSEE code: 103

The arrondissement of Troyes is an arrondissement of France in the Aube department in the Grand Est region. It has 244 communes. Its population is 230,162 (2021), and its area is 3,540.4 km^{2} (1,367.0 sq mi).

== Composition ==
The communes of the arrondissement of Troyes, and their INSEE codes, are:

1. Aix-Villemaur-Pâlis (10003)
2. Allibaudières (10004)
3. Arcis-sur-Aube (10006)
4. Arrelles (10009)
5. Assenay (10013)
6. Assencières (10014)
7. Aubeterre (10015)
8. Auxon (10018)
9. Avant-lès-Ramerupt (10021)
10. Avirey-Lingey (10022)
11. Avreuil (10024)
12. Bagneux-la-Fosse (10025)
13. Balnot-la-Grange (10028)
14. Balnot-sur-Laignes (10029)
15. Barberey-Saint-Sulpice (10030)
16. Bar-sur-Seine (10034)
17. Bercenay-en-Othe (10037)
18. Bernon (10040)
19. Bertignolles (10041)
20. Bérulle (10042)
21. Les Bordes-Aumont (10049)
22. Bouilly (10051)
23. Bouranton (10053)
24. Bourguignons (10055)
25. Bouy-Luxembourg (10056)
26. Bragelogne-Beauvoir (10058)
27. Bréviandes (10060)
28. Brévonnes (10061)
29. Briel-sur-Barse (10062)
30. Brillecourt (10065)
31. Bucey-en-Othe (10066)
32. Buchères (10067)
33. Buxeuil (10068)
34. Buxières-sur-Arce (10069)
35. Celles-sur-Ource (10070)
36. Chacenay (10071)
37. Chamoy (10074)
38. Champigny-sur-Aube (10077)
39. Channes (10079)
40. Chaource (10080)
41. La Chapelle-Saint-Luc (10081)
42. Chappes (10083)
43. Charmont-sous-Barbuise (10084)
44. Chaserey (10087)
45. Chaudrey (10091)
46. Chauffour-lès-Bailly (10092)
47. Le Chêne (10095)
48. Chennegy (10096)
49. Chervey (10097)
50. Chesley (10098)
51. Chessy-les-Prés (10099)
52. Clérey (10100)
53. Coclois (10101)
54. Cormost (10104)
55. Coursan-en-Othe (10107)
56. Courtaoult (10108)
57. Courtenot (10109)
58. Courteranges (10110)
59. Courteron (10111)
60. Coussegrey (10112)
61. Creney-près-Troyes (10115)
62. Crésantignes (10116)
63. Les Croûtes (10118)
64. Cunfin (10119)
65. Cussangy (10120)
66. Dampierre (10121)
67. Davrey (10122)
68. Dierrey-Saint-Pierre (10125)
69. Dommartin-le-Coq (10127)
70. Dosches (10129)
71. Dosnon (10130)
72. Eaux-Puiseaux (10133)
73. Éguilly-sous-Bois (10136)
74. Ervy-le-Châtel (10140)
75. Essoyes (10141)
76. Estissac (10142)
77. Étourvy (10143)
78. Fays-la-Chapelle (10147)
79. Feuges (10149)
80. Fontette (10155)
81. Fontvannes (10156)
82. Fouchères (10158)
83. Fralignes (10159)
84. Fresnoy-le-Château (10162)
85. Géraudot (10165)
86. Grandville (10167)
87. Les Granges (10168)
88. Gyé-sur-Seine (10170)
89. Herbisse (10172)
90. Isle-Aubigny (10174)
91. Isle-Aumont (10173)
92. Javernant (10177)
93. Jeugny (10179)
94. Jully-sur-Sarce (10181)
95. Lagesse (10185)
96. Laines-aux-Bois (10186)
97. Landreville (10187)
98. Lantages (10188)
99. Laubressel (10190)
100. Lavau (10191)
101. Lhuître (10195)
102. Lignières (10196)
103. Lirey (10198)
104. Loches-sur-Ource (10199)
105. La Loge-Pomblin (10201)
106. Les Loges-Margueron (10202)
107. Longeville-sur-Mogne (10204)
108. Longsols (10206)
109. Lusigny-sur-Barse (10209)
110. Luyères (10210)
111. Macey (10211)
112. Machy (10212)
113. Magnant (10213)
114. Mailly-le-Camp (10216)
115. Maisons-lès-Chaource (10218)
116. Maraye-en-Othe (10222)
117. Marolles-lès-Bailly (10226)
118. Marolles-sous-Lignières (10227)
119. Maupas (10229)
120. Mergey (10230)
121. Merrey-sur-Arce (10232)
122. Mesnil-la-Comtesse (10235)
123. Mesnil-Lettre (10236)
124. Mesnil-Saint-Père (10238)
125. Mesnil-Sellières (10239)
126. Messon (10240)
127. Metz-Robert (10241)
128. Montaulin (10245)
129. Montceaux-lès-Vaudes (10246)
130. Montfey (10247)
131. Montgueux (10248)
132. Montiéramey (10249)
133. Montigny-les-Monts (10251)
134. Montreuil-sur-Barse (10255)
135. Montsuzain (10256)
136. Morembert (10257)
137. Moussey (10260)
138. Mussy-sur-Seine (10261)
139. Neuville-sur-Seine (10262)
140. Neuville-sur-Vanne (10263)
141. Noé-les-Mallets (10264)
142. Les Noës-près-Troyes (10265)
143. Nogent-en-Othe (10266)
144. Nogent-sur-Aube (10267)
145. Nozay (10269)
146. Onjon (10270)
147. Ormes (10272)
148. Ortillon (10273)
149. Paisy-Cosdon (10276)
150. Pargues (10278)
151. Le Pavillon-Sainte-Julie (10281)
152. Payns (10282)
153. Piney (10287)
154. Plaines-Saint-Lange (10288)
155. Planty (10290)
156. Poivres (10293)
157. Poligny (10294)
158. Polisot (10295)
159. Polisy (10296)
160. Pont-Sainte-Marie (10297)
161. Pouan-les-Vallées (10299)
162. Pougy (10300)
163. Praslin (10302)
164. Prugny (10307)
165. Prusy (10309)
166. Racines (10312)
167. Ramerupt (10314)
168. Les Riceys (10317)
169. Rigny-le-Ferron (10319)
170. La Rivière-de-Corps (10321)
171. Roncenay (10324)
172. Rosières-près-Troyes (10325)
173. Rouilly-Sacey (10328)
174. Rouilly-Saint-Loup (10329)
175. Rumilly-lès-Vaudes (10331)
176. Ruvigny (10332)
177. Saint-André-les-Vergers (10333)
178. Saint-Benoist-sur-Vanne (10335)
179. Saint-Benoît-sur-Seine (10336)
180. Sainte-Maure (10352)
181. Sainte-Savine (10362)
182. Saint-Étienne-sous-Barbuise (10338)
183. Saint-Germain (10340)
184. Saint-Jean-de-Bonneval (10342)
185. Saint-Julien-les-Villas (10343)
186. Saint-Léger-près-Troyes (10344)
187. Saint-Lyé (10349)
188. Saint-Mards-en-Othe (10350)
189. Saint-Nabord-sur-Aube (10354)
190. Saint-Parres-aux-Tertres (10357)
191. Saint-Parres-lès-Vaudes (10358)
192. Saint-Phal (10359)
193. Saint-Pouange (10360)
194. Saint-Remy-sous-Barbuise (10361)
195. Saint-Thibault (10363)
196. Saint-Usage (10364)
197. Semoine (10369)
198. Sommeval (10371)
199. Souligny (10373)
200. Thennelières (10375)
201. Thieffrain (10376)
202. Torcy-le-Grand (10379)
203. Torcy-le-Petit (10380)
204. Torvilliers (10381)
205. Trouans (10386)
206. Troyes (10387)
207. Turgy (10388)
208. Vailly (10391)
209. Val-d'Auzon (10019)
210. Vallières (10394)
211. Vanlay (10395)
212. Vauchassis (10396)
213. Vaucogne (10398)
214. Vaudes (10399)
215. Vaupoisson (10400)
216. La Vendue-Mignot (10402)
217. Verpillières-sur-Ource (10404)
218. Verricourt (10405)
219. Verrières (10406)
220. Villacerf (10409)
221. Villechétif (10412)
222. Villeloup (10414)
223. Villemereuil (10416)
224. Villemoiron-en-Othe (10417)
225. Villemorien (10418)
226. Villemoyenne (10419)
227. Villeneuve-au-Chemin (10422)
228. Villery (10425)
229. Ville-sur-Arce (10427)
230. Villette-sur-Aube (10429)
231. Villiers-Herbisse (10430)
232. Villiers-le-Bois (10431)
233. Villiers-sous-Praslin (10432)
234. Villy-en-Trodes (10433)
235. Villy-le-Bois (10434)
236. Villy-le-Maréchal (10435)
237. Vinets (10436)
238. Virey-sous-Bar (10437)
239. Vitry-le-Croisé (10438)
240. Viviers-sur-Artaut (10439)
241. Vosnon (10441)
242. Voué (10442)
243. Vougrey (10443)
244. Vulaines (10444)

== History ==
The arrondissement of Troyes was created in 1800. At the January 2018 reorganization of the arrondissements of Aube, it lost four communes to the arrondissement of Bar-sur-Aube, and it gained one commune from the arrondissement of Nogent-sur-Seine.

As a result of the reorganisation of the cantons of France which came into effect in 2015, the borders of the cantons are no longer related to the borders of the arrondissements. The cantons of the arrondissement of Troyes were, as of January 2015:

1. Aix-en-Othe
2. Arcis-sur-Aube
3. Bar-sur-Seine
4. Bouilly
5. Chaource
6. La Chapelle-Saint-Luc
7. Ervy-le-Châtel
8. Essoyes
9. Estissac
10. Lusigny-sur-Barse
11. Mussy-sur-Seine
12. Piney
13. Ramerupt
14. Les Riceys
15. Sainte-Savine
16. Troyes-1
17. Troyes-2
18. Troyes-3
19. Troyes-4
20. Troyes-5
21. Troyes-6
22. Troyes-7
