= Lhuître =

Commune in Grand Est, France

- Commune
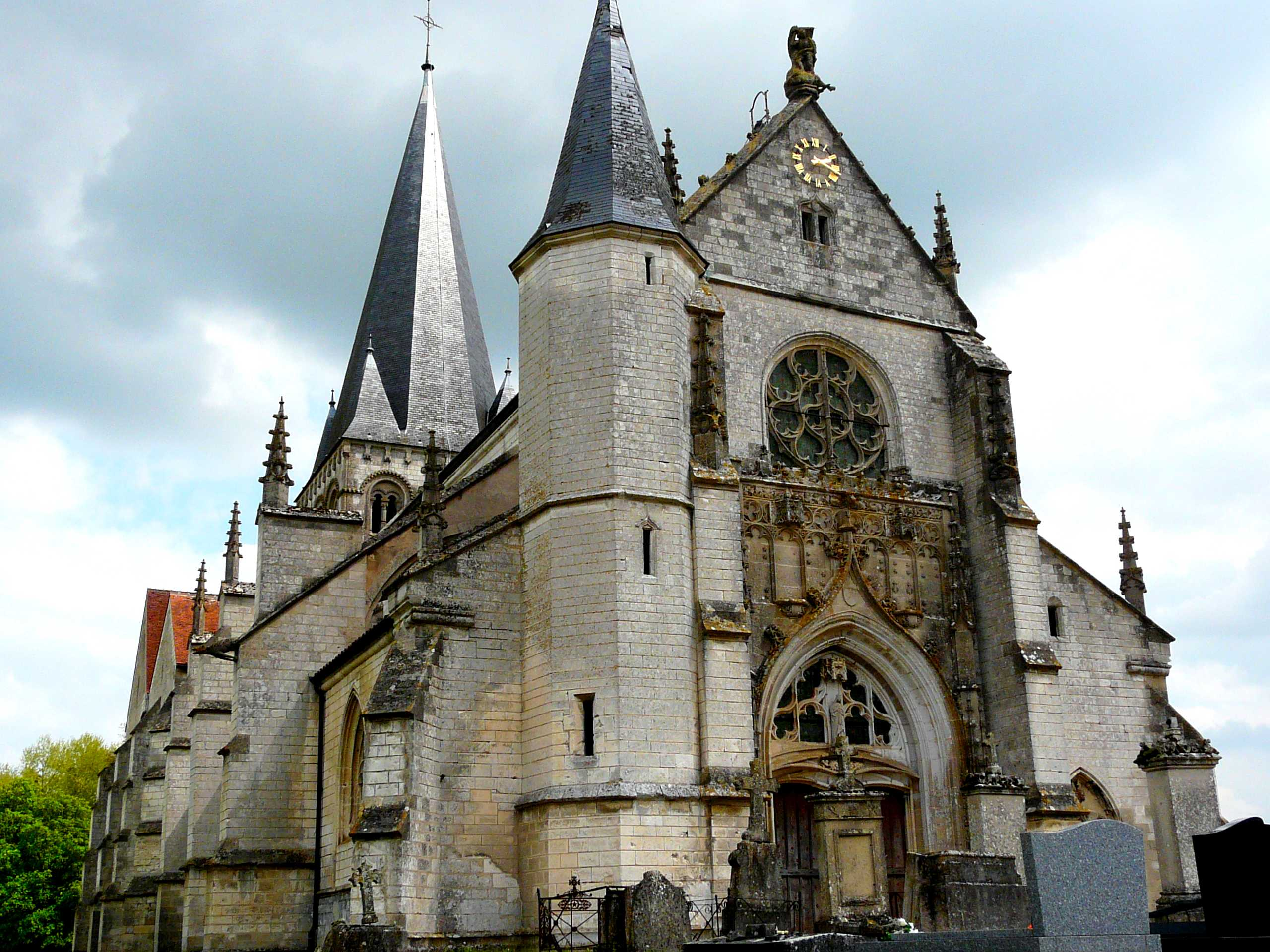
- The church in Lhuître
- Location of Lhuître
- Location within France Location within Grand Est
- Coordinates: 48°34′17″N 4°15′02″E
- Country: France
- Region: Grand Est
- Department: Aube
- Arrondissement: Troyes
- Canton: Arcis-sur-Aube

Government
  - Mayor (2020–2026): Denis Turpin
- Area^{1}: 35.82 km^{2} (13.83 sq mi)
- Elevation: 100 m (330 ft)
- Highest elevation: 196 m (643 ft)
- Lowest elevation: 93 m (305 ft)
- Population (2023): 268
  - Density: 7.48/km^{2} (19.4/sq mi)
- Time zone: UTC+01:00 (CET)
  - Summer (DST): UTC+02:00 (CEST)
- INSEE/Postal code: 10195 /10700
- ^{1} French Land Register data, which excludes lakes, ponds, glaciers > 1 km^{2} (0.386 sq mi or 247 acres) and river estuaries.

Lhuître (French pronunciation: [lɥitʁ]) is a commune in the Aube department in north-central France.

== Population ==
Historical population
Year	Pop.	±% p.a.
1968	300	—
1975	275	−1.24%
1982	269	−0.31%
1990	261	−0.38%
1999	234	−1.21%
2007	263	+1.47%
2012	294	+2.25%
2017	298	+0.27%
2023	268	−1.75%
Source: INSEE

== See also ==
- Communes of the Aube department
