= Chaudrey =

Commune in Grand Est, France

- Commune
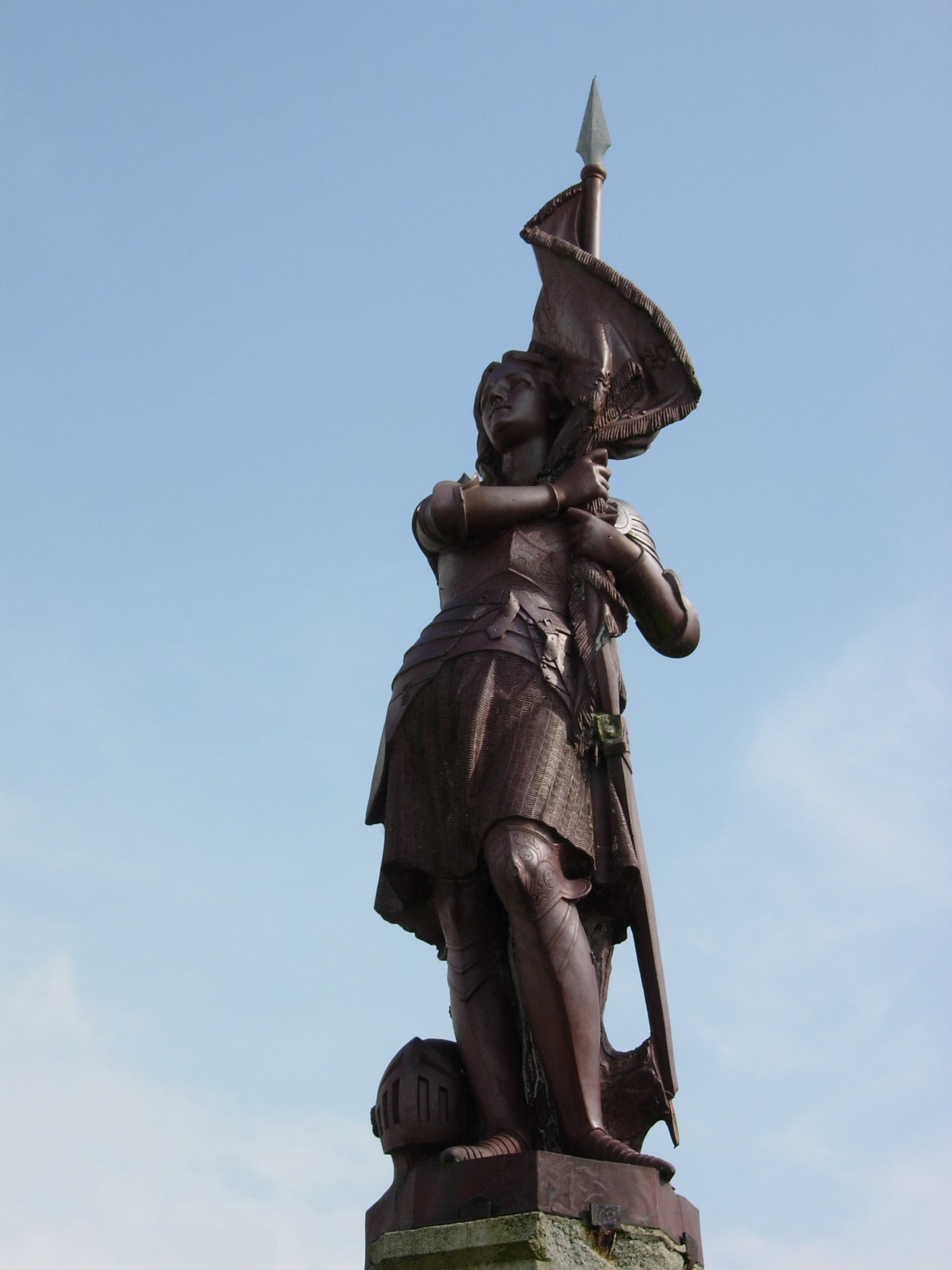
- War memorial

- Coat of arms
- Location of Chaudrey
- Location within France Location within Grand Est
- Coordinates: 48°30′18″N 4°16′32″E
- Country: France
- Region: Grand Est
- Department: Aube
- Arrondissement: Troyes
- Canton: Arcis-sur-Aube

Government
  - Mayor (2020–2026): Jean-Jacques Lagoguey
- Area^{1}: 13.68 km^{2} (5.28 sq mi)
- Elevation: 97 m (318 ft)
- Population (2023): 139
  - Density: 10.2/km^{2} (26.3/sq mi)
- Time zone: UTC+01:00 (CET)
  - Summer (DST): UTC+02:00 (CEST)
- INSEE/Postal code: 10091 /10240
- ^{1} French Land Register data, which excludes lakes, ponds, glaciers > 1 km^{2} (0.386 sq mi or 247 acres) and river estuaries.

Chaudrey (French pronunciation: [ʃodʁɛ]) is a commune in the Aube department in north-central France.

== Population ==
Historical population
Year	Pop.	±% p.a.
1968	129	—
1975	140	+1.18%
1982	136	−0.41%
1990	157	+1.81%
1999	144	−0.96%
2007	154	+0.84%
2012	158	+0.51%
2017	144	−1.84%
2023	139	−0.59%
Source: INSEE

== See also ==
- Communes of the Aube department
