= Mesnil-la-Comtesse =

Commune in Grand Est, France

- Commune
- Location of Mesnil-la-Comtesse
- Location within France Location within Grand Est
- Coordinates: 48°29′51″N 4°11′47″E
- Country: France
- Region: Grand Est
- Department: Aube
- Arrondissement: Troyes
- Canton: Arcis-sur-Aube

Government
  - Mayor (2020–2026): Dominique Sommesous
- Area^{1}: 0.9 km^{2} (0.35 sq mi)
- Elevation: 120 m (390 ft)
- Population (2023): 58
  - Density: 64/km^{2} (170/sq mi)
- Time zone: UTC+01:00 (CET)
  - Summer (DST): UTC+02:00 (CEST)
- INSEE/Postal code: 10235 /10700
- ^{1} French Land Register data, which excludes lakes, ponds, glaciers > 1 km^{2} (0.386 sq mi or 247 acres) and river estuaries.

Mesnil-la-Comtesse (French pronunciation: [mɛnil la kɔ̃tɛs]) is a commune in the Aube department in north-central France.

== Population ==
Historical population
Year	Pop.	±% p.a.
1968	59	—
1975	53	−1.52%
1982	53	+0.00%
1990	46	−1.76%
1999	52	+1.37%
2007	38	−3.84%
2012	35	−1.63%
2017	45	+5.15%
2023	58	+4.32%
Source: INSEE

== See also ==
- Communes of the Aube department
