= Dosnon =

Commune in Grand Est, France

- Commune
- Location of Dosnon
- Location within France Location within Grand Est
- Coordinates: 48°36′41″N 4°13′50″E
- Country: France
- Region: Grand Est
- Department: Aube
- Arrondissement: Troyes
- Canton: Arcis-sur-Aube

Government
  - Mayor (2020–2026): Ghislaine Bonnet
- Area^{1}: 28.69 km^{2} (11.08 sq mi)
- Elevation: 109 m (358 ft)
- Population (2023): 100
  - Density: 3.5/km^{2} (9.0/sq mi)
- Time zone: UTC+01:00 (CET)
  - Summer (DST): UTC+02:00 (CEST)
- INSEE/Postal code: 10130 /10700
- ^{1} French Land Register data, which excludes lakes, ponds, glaciers > 1 km^{2} (0.386 sq mi or 247 acres) and river estuaries.

Dosnon (French pronunciation: [donɔ̃]) is a commune in the Aube department in north-central France.

== Population ==
Historical population
Year	Pop.	±% p.a.
1968	119	—
1975	106	−1.64%
1982	101	−0.69%
1990	95	−0.76%
1999	79	−2.03%
2007	95	+2.33%
2012	118	+4.43%
2017	106	−2.12%
2023	100	−0.97%
Source: INSEE

== See also ==
- Communes of the Aube department
