= Ortillon =

Commune in Grand Est, France

- Commune
- Location of Ortillon
- Location within France Location within Grand Est
- Coordinates: 48°30′49″N 4°14′57″E
- Country: France
- Region: Grand Est
- Department: Aube
- Arrondissement: Troyes
- Canton: Arcis-sur-Aube

Government
  - Mayor (2020–2026): Patrick Albaret
- Area^{1}: 8.02 km^{2} (3.10 sq mi)
- Elevation: 97 m (318 ft)
- Population (2023): 21
  - Density: 2.6/km^{2} (6.8/sq mi)
- Time zone: UTC+01:00 (CET)
  - Summer (DST): UTC+02:00 (CEST)
- INSEE/Postal code: 10273 /10700
- ^{1} French Land Register data, which excludes lakes, ponds, glaciers > 1 km^{2} (0.386 sq mi or 247 acres) and river estuaries.

Ortillon (French pronunciation: [ɔʁtijɔ̃]) is a commune in the Aube department in north-central France.

== Population ==
Historical population
| Year | Pop. | ±% p.a. |
|---|---|---|
| 1968 | 37 | — |
| 1975 | 46 | +3.16% |
| 1982 | 40 | −1.98% |
| 1990 | 43 | +0.91% |
| 1999 | 32 | −3.23% |
| 2007 | 35 | +1.13% |
| 2012 | 29 | −3.69% |
| 2017 | 24 | −3.71% |
| 2023 | 21 | −2.20% |
Source: INSEE

== See also ==
- Communes of the Aube department
