= Isle-Aubigny =

Commune in Grand Est, France

- Commune
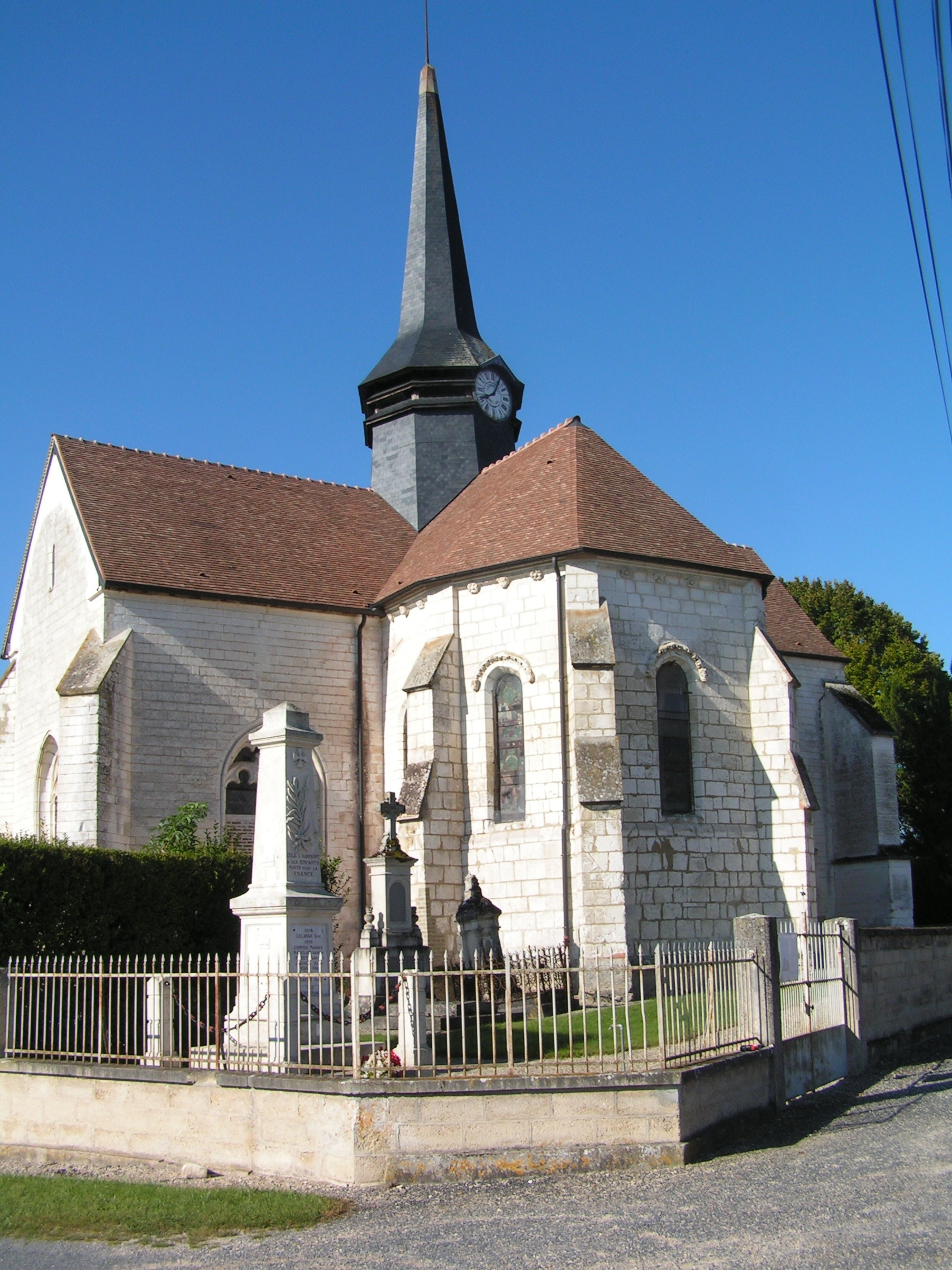
- The church in Isle-Aubigny
- Location of Isle-Aubigny
- Location within France Location within Grand Est
- Coordinates: 48°31′34″N 4°15′59″E
- Country: France
- Region: Grand Est
- Department: Aube
- Arrondissement: Troyes
- Canton: Arcis-sur-Aube

Government
  - Mayor (2020–2026): Didier Poirson
- Area^{1}: 18.76 km^{2} (7.24 sq mi)
- Elevation: 97 m (318 ft)
- Population (2023): 166
  - Density: 8.85/km^{2} (22.9/sq mi)
- Time zone: UTC+01:00 (CET)
  - Summer (DST): UTC+02:00 (CEST)
- INSEE/Postal code: 10174 /10240
- ^{1} French Land Register data, which excludes lakes, ponds, glaciers > 1 km^{2} (0.386 sq mi or 247 acres) and river estuaries.

Isle-Aubigny (French pronunciation: [il obiɲi]) is a commune in the Aube department in north-central France.

== Population ==
Historical population
Year	Pop.	±% p.a.
1968	190	—
1975	172	−1.41%
1982	145	−2.41%
1990	152	+0.59%
1999	142	−0.75%
2007	146	+0.35%
2012	168	+2.85%
2017	179	+1.28%
2023	166	−1.25%
Source: INSEE

== See also ==
- Communes of the Aube department
