= Morembert =

Administrative division in Grand Est, France

- Commune
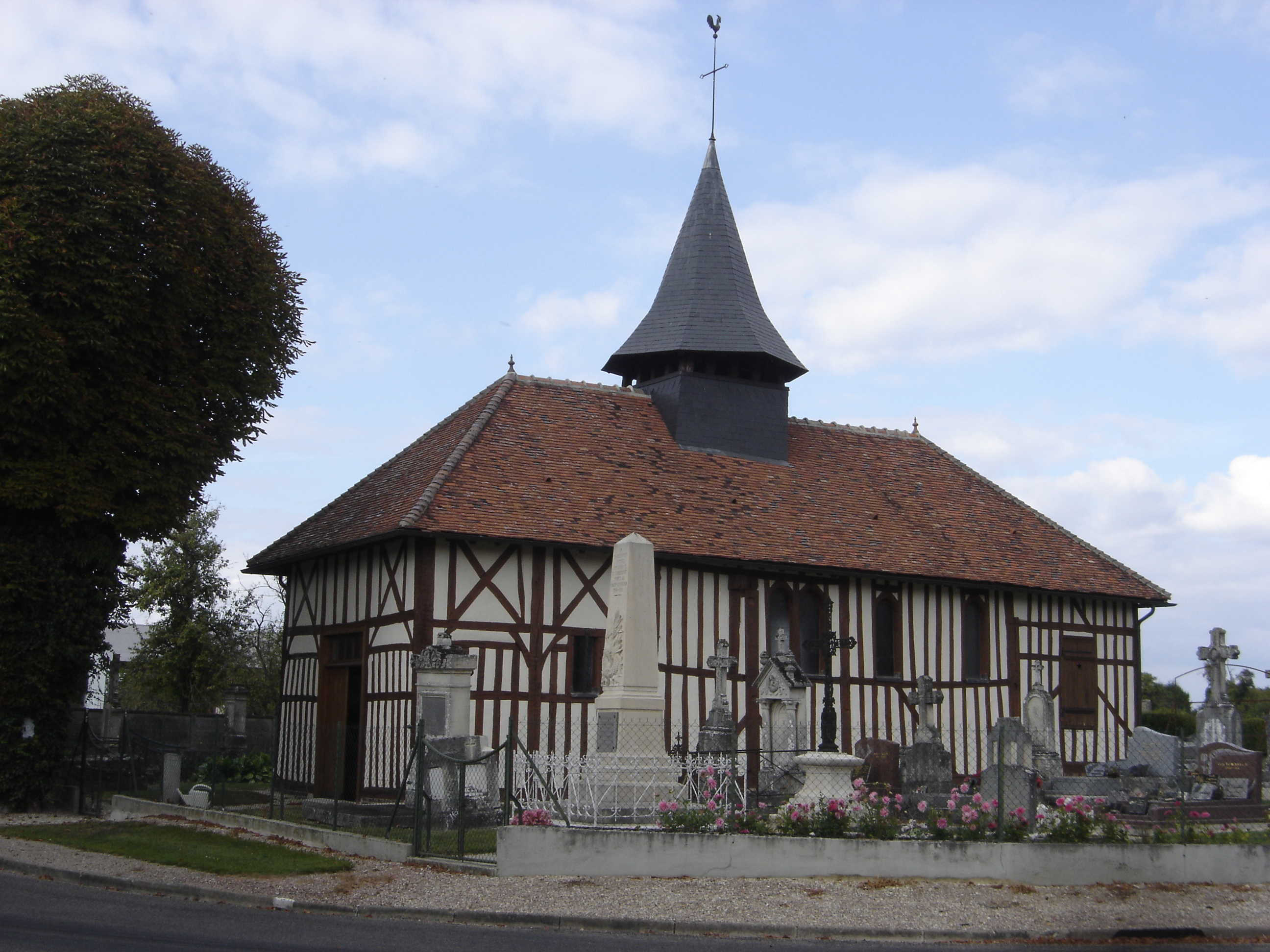
- The church in Morembert
- Location of Morembert
- Location within France Location within Grand Est
- Coordinates: 48°30′14″N 4°19′48″E
- Country: France
- Region: Grand Est
- Department: Aube
- Arrondissement: Troyes
- Canton: Arcis-sur-Aube

Government
  - Mayor (2020–2026): Dominique Henry
- Area^{1}: 2.5 km^{2} (0.97 sq mi)
- Elevation: 107 m (351 ft)
- Population (2023): 30
  - Density: 12/km^{2} (31/sq mi)
- Time zone: UTC+01:00 (CET)
  - Summer (DST): UTC+02:00 (CEST)
- INSEE/Postal code: 10257 /10240
- ^{1} French Land Register data, which excludes lakes, ponds, glaciers > 1 km^{2} (0.386 sq mi or 247 acres) and river estuaries.

Morembert (French pronunciation: [mɔʁɑ̃bɛʁ]) is a commune in the Aube department in north-central France.

== Population ==
Historical population
Year	Pop.	±% p.a.
1968	24	—
1975	24	+0.00%
1982	31	+3.72%
1990	28	−1.26%
1999	37	+3.15%
2007	47	+3.04%
2012	40	−3.17%
2017	31	−4.97%
2023	30	−0.55%
Source: INSEE

== See also ==
- Communes of the Aube department
