= Canton of Troyes-6 =

Coordinates: 48°17′51″N 4°04′29″E

The Canton of Troyes-6 is a former canton of the arrondissement of Troyes, in the Aube department, in northern France. It had 20,121 inhabitants (2012). It was disbanded following the French canton reorganisation which came into effect in March 2015. It consisted of 4 communes:

- Laines-aux-Bois
- Saint-André-les-Vergers
- Saint-Germain
- Troyes (partly)
