= Saint-Étienne-sous-Barbuise =

Commune in Grand Est, France

- Commune
- Location of Saint-Étienne-sous-Barbuise
- Location within France Location within Grand Est
- Coordinates: 48°30′03″N 4°06′36″E
- Country: France
- Region: Grand Est
- Department: Aube
- Arrondissement: Troyes
- Canton: Arcis-sur-Aube

Government
  - Mayor (2020–2026): Maud Guyot
- Area^{1}: 10.84 km^{2} (4.19 sq mi)
- Elevation: 100 m (330 ft)
- Highest elevation: 140 m (460 ft)
- Lowest elevation: 98 m (322 ft)
- Population (2023): 173
  - Density: 16.0/km^{2} (41.3/sq mi)
- Time zone: UTC+01:00 (CET)
  - Summer (DST): UTC+02:00 (CEST)
- INSEE/Postal code: 10338 /10700
- ^{1} French Land Register data, which excludes lakes, ponds, glaciers > 1 km^{2} (0.386 sq mi or 247 acres) and river estuaries.

Saint-Étienne-sous-Barbuise (French pronunciation: [sɛ̃.t‿etjɛn su baʁbɥiz], literally Saint-Étienne under Barbuise) is a commune in the Aube department in north-central France.

== Population ==
Historical population
Year	Pop.	±% p.a.
1968	154	—
1975	144	−0.95%
1982	147	+0.29%
1990	117	−2.81%
1999	118	+0.09%
2007	132	+1.41%
2012	144	+1.76%
2017	167	+3.01%
2023	173	+0.59%
Source: INSEE

== See also ==
- Communes of the Aube department
