= Semoine =

Commune in Grand Est, France

- Commune
- Coat of arms
- Location of Semoine
- Location within France Location within Grand Est
- Coordinates: 48°40′48″N 4°05′19″E
- Country: France
- Region: Grand Est
- Department: Aube
- Arrondissement: Troyes
- Canton: Arcis-sur-Aube

Government
  - Mayor (2020–2026): Pascal Noblet
- Area^{1}: 22.55 km^{2} (8.71 sq mi)
- Elevation: 106 m (348 ft)
- Highest elevation: 169 m (554 ft)
- Lowest elevation: 121 m (397 ft)
- Population (2023): 218
  - Density: 9.67/km^{2} (25.0/sq mi)
- Time zone: UTC+01:00 (CET)
  - Summer (DST): UTC+02:00 (CEST)
- INSEE/Postal code: 10369 /10700
- ^{1} French Land Register data, which excludes lakes, ponds, glaciers > 1 km^{2} (0.386 sq mi or 247 acres) and river estuaries.

Semoine (French pronunciation: [səmwan]) is a commune in the Aube department in north-central France.

== Population ==
Historical population
| Year | Pop. | ±% p.a. |
|---|---|---|
| 1968 | 277 | — |
| 1975 | 250 | −1.45% |
| 1982 | 221 | −1.75% |
| 1990 | 182 | −2.40% |
| 1999 | 180 | −0.12% |
| 2007 | 219 | +2.48% |
| 2012 | 228 | +0.81% |
| 2017 | 199 | −2.68% |
| 2023 | 218 | +1.53% |
Source: INSEE

== See also ==
- Communes of the Aube department
