= Verricourt =

Commune in Grand Est, France

- Commune
- Location of Verricourt
- Location within France Location within Grand Est
- Coordinates: 48°27′08″N 4°20′55″E
- Country: France
- Region: Grand Est
- Department: Aube
- Arrondissement: Troyes
- Canton: Arcis-sur-Aube

Government
  - Mayor (2020–2026): Céline Prévot
- Area^{1}: 6.93 km^{2} (2.68 sq mi)
- Elevation: 136 m (446 ft)
- Population (2023): 61
  - Density: 8.8/km^{2} (23/sq mi)
- Time zone: UTC+01:00 (CET)
  - Summer (DST): UTC+02:00 (CEST)
- INSEE/Postal code: 10405 /10240
- ^{1} French Land Register data, which excludes lakes, ponds, glaciers > 1 km^{2} (0.386 sq mi or 247 acres) and river estuaries.

Verricourt (French pronunciation: [vɛʁikuʁ]) is a commune in the Aube department in north-central France.

== Population ==
Historical population
Year	Pop.	±% p.a.
1968	58	—
1975	50	−2.10%
1982	30	−7.04%
1990	38	+3.00%
1999	44	+1.64%
2007	45	+0.28%
2012	42	−1.37%
2017	53	+4.76%
2023	61	+2.37%
Source: INSEE

== See also ==
- Communes of the Aube department
