= Brillecourt =

Commune in Grand Est, France

- Commune
- Location of Brillecourt
- Location within France Location within Grand Est
- Coordinates: 48°28′21″N 4°21′56″E
- Country: France
- Region: Grand Est
- Department: Aube
- Arrondissement: Troyes
- Canton: Arcis-sur-Aube

Government
  - Mayor (2020–2026): Malik Tahar Akkouche
- Area^{1}: 5.73 km^{2} (2.21 sq mi)
- Elevation: 107 m (351 ft)
- Population (2023): 91
  - Density: 16/km^{2} (41/sq mi)
- Time zone: UTC+01:00 (CET)
  - Summer (DST): UTC+02:00 (CEST)
- INSEE/Postal code: 10065 /10240
- ^{1} French Land Register data, which excludes lakes, ponds, glaciers > 1 km^{2} (0.386 sq mi or 247 acres) and river estuaries.

Brillecourt (French pronunciation: [bʁijkuʁ]) is a commune in the Aube department in north-central France.

== Population ==
Historical population
Year	Pop.	±% p.a.
1968	112	—
1975	114	+0.25%
1982	82	−4.60%
1990	77	−0.78%
1999	81	+0.56%
2007	87	+0.90%
2012	96	+1.99%
2017	89	−1.50%
2023	91	+0.37%
Source: INSEE

== See also ==
- Communes of the Aube department
