= Vaucogne =

Commune in Grand Est, France

- Commune
- Location of Vaucogne
- Location within France Location within Grand Est
- Coordinates: 48°31′44″N 4°20′42″E
- Country: France
- Region: Grand Est
- Department: Aube
- Arrondissement: Troyes
- Canton: Arcis-sur-Aube

Government
  - Mayor (2020–2026): Guy Bernier
- Area^{1}: 16.51 km^{2} (6.37 sq mi)
- Elevation: 105 m (344 ft)
- Population (2023): 70
  - Density: 4.2/km^{2} (11/sq mi)
- Time zone: UTC+01:00 (CET)
  - Summer (DST): UTC+02:00 (CEST)
- INSEE/Postal code: 10398 /10240
- ^{1} French Land Register data, which excludes lakes, ponds, glaciers > 1 km^{2} (0.386 sq mi or 247 acres) and river estuaries.

Vaucogne (French pronunciation: [vokɔɲ]) is a commune in the Aube department in north-central France.

== Population ==
Historical population
Year	Pop.	±% p.a.
1968	69	—
1975	60	−1.98%
1982	55	−1.24%
1990	68	+2.69%
1999	65	−0.50%
2007	79	+2.47%
2012	76	−0.77%
2017	74	−0.53%
2023	70	−0.92%
Source: INSEE

== See also ==
- Communes of the Aube department
