= Saint-Remy-sous-Barbuise =

Commune in Grand Est, France

- Commune
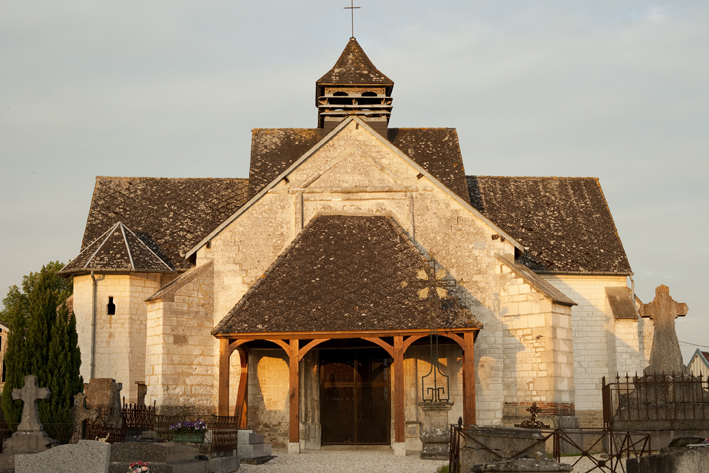
- The church in Saint-Remy-sous-Barbuise
- Location of Saint-Remy-sous-Barbuise
- Location within France Location within Grand Est
- Coordinates: 48°29′02″N 4°07′01″E
- Country: France
- Region: Grand Est
- Department: Aube
- Arrondissement: Troyes
- Canton: Arcis-sur-Aube

Government
  - Mayor (2020–2026): Jean-Claude Jacquier
- Area^{1}: 15.57 km^{2} (6.01 sq mi)
- Elevation: 106 m (348 ft)
- Highest elevation: 158 m (518 ft)
- Lowest elevation: 99 m (325 ft)
- Population (2023): 257
  - Density: 16.5/km^{2} (42.8/sq mi)
- Time zone: UTC+01:00 (CET)
  - Summer (DST): UTC+02:00 (CEST)
- INSEE/Postal code: 10361 /10700
- ^{1} French Land Register data, which excludes lakes, ponds, glaciers > 1 km^{2} (0.386 sq mi or 247 acres) and river estuaries.

Saint-Remy-sous-Barbuise is a commune in the Aube department in north-central France.

== Population ==
Historical population
Year	Pop.	±% p.a.
1968	103	—
1975	95	−1.15%
1982	146	+6.33%
1990	151	+0.42%
1999	140	−0.84%
2007	165	+2.08%
2012	203	+4.23%
2017	231	+2.62%
2023	257	+1.79%
Source: INSEE

== See also ==
- Communes of the Aube department
