= Vinets =

Commune in Grand Est, France

- Commune
- Coat of arms
- Location of Vinets
- Location within France Location within Grand Est
- Coordinates: 48°32′07″N 4°14′20″E
- Country: France
- Region: Grand Est
- Department: Aube
- Arrondissement: Troyes
- Canton: Arcis-sur-Aube

Government
  - Mayor (2020–2026): Jessica Chaine
- Area^{1}: 9.17 km^{2} (3.54 sq mi)
- Elevation: 247 m (810 ft)
- Population (2023): 191
  - Density: 20.8/km^{2} (53.9/sq mi)
- Time zone: UTC+01:00 (CET)
  - Summer (DST): UTC+02:00 (CEST)
- INSEE/Postal code: 10436 /10700
- ^{1} French Land Register data, which excludes lakes, ponds, glaciers > 1 km^{2} (0.386 sq mi or 247 acres) and river estuaries.

Vinets is a commune in the Aube department in north-central France.

== Population ==
Historical population
Year	Pop.	±% p.a.
1968	179	—
1975	168	−0.90%
1982	188	+1.62%
1990	181	−0.47%
1999	176	−0.31%
2007	172	−0.29%
2012	180	+0.91%
2017	170	−1.14%
2023	191	+1.96%
Source: INSEE

== See also ==
- Communes of the Aube department
