= Vaupoisson =

Commune in Grand Est, France

- Commune
- Coat of arms
- Location of Vaupoisson
- Location within France Location within Grand Est
- Coordinates: 48°31′04″N 4°14′10″E
- Country: France
- Region: Grand Est
- Department: Aube
- Arrondissement: Troyes
- Canton: Arcis-sur-Aube

Government
  - Mayor (2020–2026): Denis Mauclaire
- Area^{1}: 10.79 km^{2} (4.17 sq mi)
- Elevation: 103 m (338 ft)
- Population (2023): 132
  - Density: 12.2/km^{2} (31.7/sq mi)
- Time zone: UTC+01:00 (CET)
  - Summer (DST): UTC+02:00 (CEST)
- INSEE/Postal code: 10400 /10700
- ^{1} French Land Register data, which excludes lakes, ponds, glaciers > 1 km^{2} (0.386 sq mi or 247 acres) and river estuaries.

Vaupoisson (French pronunciation: [vopwasɔ̃]) is a commune in the Aube department in north-central France.

== Population ==
Historical population
Year	Pop.	±% p.a.
1968	152	—
1975	146	−0.57%
1982	133	−1.32%
1990	151	+1.60%
1999	139	−0.92%
2007	144	+0.44%
2012	137	−0.99%
2017	120	−2.61%
2023	132	+1.60%
Source: INSEE

== See also ==
- Communes of the Aube department
