= Dommartin-le-Coq =

Commune in Grand Est, France

- Commune
- Location of Dommartin-le-Coq
- Location within France Location within Grand Est
- Coordinates: 48°30′05″N 4°21′28″E
- Country: France
- Region: Grand Est
- Department: Aube
- Arrondissement: Troyes
- Canton: Arcis-sur-Aube

Government
  - Mayor (2020–2026): Patrick Brodard
- Area^{1}: 6.34 km^{2} (2.45 sq mi)
- Elevation: 103 m (338 ft)
- Highest elevation: 162 m (531 ft)
- Lowest elevation: 98 m (322 ft)
- Population (2023): 49
  - Density: 7.7/km^{2} (20/sq mi)
- Time zone: UTC+01:00 (CET)
  - Summer (DST): UTC+02:00 (CEST)
- INSEE/Postal code: 10127 /10240
- ^{1} French Land Register data, which excludes lakes, ponds, glaciers > 1 km^{2} (0.386 sq mi or 247 acres) and river estuaries.

Dommartin-le-Coq (French pronunciation: [dɔmaʁtɛ̃ lə kɔk]) is a commune in the Aube department in north-central France.

== Population ==
Historical population
Year	Pop.	±% p.a.
1968	88	—
1975	71	−3.02%
1982	65	−1.25%
1990	71	+1.11%
1999	60	−1.85%
2007	64	+0.81%
2012	65	+0.31%
2017	62	−0.94%
2023	49	−3.85%
Source: INSEE

== See also ==
- Communes of the Aube department
