= Villette-sur-Aube =

Commune in Grand Est, France

- Commune
- Location of Villette-sur-Aube
- Location within France Location within Grand Est
- Coordinates: 48°32′09″N 4°06′02″E
- Country: France
- Region: Grand Est
- Department: Aube
- Arrondissement: Troyes
- Canton: Arcis-sur-Aube
- Intercommunality: Arcis, Mailly, Ramerupt

Government
  - Mayor (2020–2026): Dominique Seurat
- Area^{1}: 15.57 km^{2} (6.01 sq mi)
- Elevation: 94 m (308 ft)
- Highest elevation: 121 m (397 ft)
- Lowest elevation: 85 m (279 ft)
- Population (2023): 253
  - Density: 16.2/km^{2} (42.1/sq mi)
- Time zone: UTC+01:00 (CET)
  - Summer (DST): UTC+02:00 (CEST)
- INSEE/Postal code: 10429 /10700
- ^{1} French Land Register data, which excludes lakes, ponds, glaciers > 1 km^{2} (0.386 sq mi or 247 acres) and river estuaries.

Villette-sur-Aube (French pronunciation: [vilɛt syʁ ob], literally Villette on Aube) is a commune in the Aube department in north-central France.

== Population ==
Historical population
Year	Pop.	±% p.a.
1968	186	—
1975	207	+1.54%
1982	194	−0.92%
1990	181	−0.86%
1999	175	−0.37%
2007	222	+3.02%
2012	261	+3.29%
2017	258	−0.23%
2023	253	−0.33%
Source: INSEE

== See also ==
- Communes of the Aube department
