= Ormes, Aube =

Commune in Grand Est, France

Ormes
- Commune
- Location of Ormes
- Location within France Location within Grand Est
- Coordinates: 48°33′10″N 4°06′59″E
- Country: France
- Region: Grand Est
- Department: Aube
- Arrondissement: Troyes
- Canton: Arcis-sur-Aube
- Intercommunality: Arcis, Mailly, Ramerupt

Government
  - Mayor (2020–2026): Jean-Paul Jacques
- Area^{1}: 10.14 km^{2} (3.92 sq mi)
- Elevation: 88 m (289 ft)
- Highest elevation: 142 m (466 ft)
- Lowest elevation: 83 m (272 ft)
- Population (2023): 163
  - Density: 16.1/km^{2} (41.6/sq mi)
- Time zone: UTC+01:00 (CET)
  - Summer (DST): UTC+02:00 (CEST)
- INSEE/Postal code: 10272 /10700
- ^{1} French Land Register data, which excludes lakes, ponds, glaciers > 1 km^{2} (0.386 sq mi or 247 acres) and river estuaries.

Ormes (French pronunciation: [ɔʁm]) is a commune in the Aube department in north-central France.

== Population ==
Historical population
Year	Pop.	±% p.a.
1968	187	—
1975	175	−0.94%
1982	204	+2.21%
1990	210	+0.36%
1999	193	−0.93%
2007	197	+0.26%
2012	198	+0.10%
2017	181	−1.78%
2023	163	−1.73%
Source: INSEE

== See also ==
- Communes of the Aube department
