= Grandville, Aube =

Commune in Grand Est, France

Grandville
- Commune
- Location of Grandville
- Location within France Location within Grand Est
- Coordinates: 48°35′45″N 4°13′56″E
- Country: France
- Region: Grand Est
- Department: Aube
- Arrondissement: Troyes
- Canton: Arcis-sur-Aube

Government
  - Mayor (2020–2026): Maurice Martin
- Area^{1}: 9.24 km^{2} (3.57 sq mi)
- Highest elevation: 163 m (535 ft)
- Lowest elevation: 102 m (335 ft)
- Population (2023): 86
  - Density: 9.3/km^{2} (24/sq mi)
- Time zone: UTC+01:00 (CET)
  - Summer (DST): UTC+02:00 (CEST)
- INSEE/Postal code: 10167 /10700
- ^{1} French Land Register data, which excludes lakes, ponds, glaciers > 1 km^{2} (0.386 sq mi or 247 acres) and river estuaries.

Grandville (French pronunciation: [ɡʁɑ̃vil]) is a commune in the Aube department in north-central France.

== Population ==
Historical population
| Year | Pop. | ±% p.a. |
|---|---|---|
| 1968 | 108 | — |
| 1975 | 73 | −5.44% |
| 1982 | 63 | −2.08% |
| 1990 | 84 | +3.66% |
| 1999 | 86 | +0.26% |
| 2007 | 90 | +0.57% |
| 2012 | 112 | +4.47% |
| 2017 | 95 | −3.24% |
| 2023 | 86 | −1.65% |
Source: INSEE

== See also ==
- Communes of the Aube department
