= Luyères =

Commune in Grand Est, France

- Commune
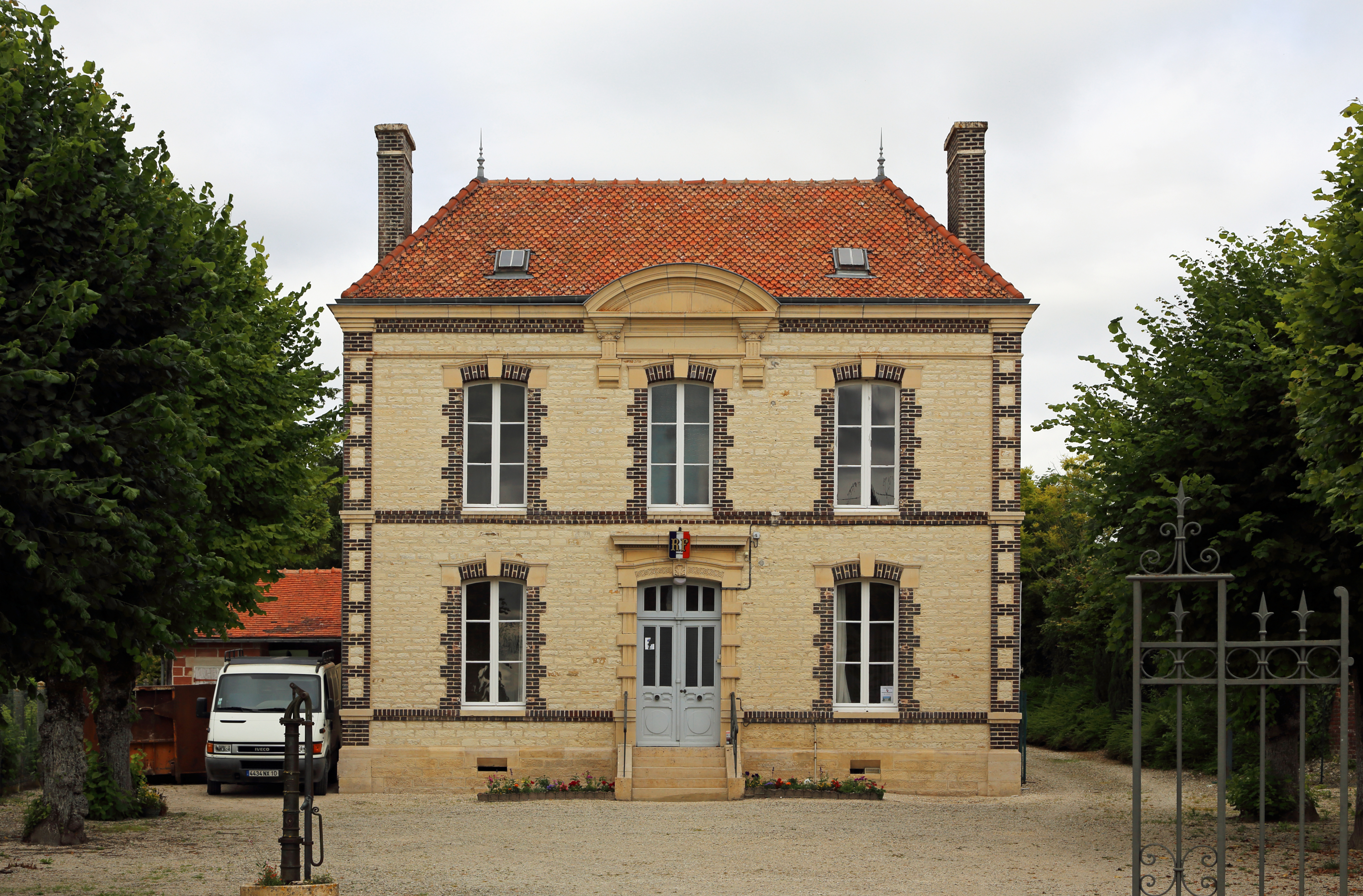
- The town hall in Luyères

- Coat of arms
- Location of Luyères
- Location within France Location within Grand Est
- Coordinates: 48°22′59″N 4°11′44″E
- Country: France
- Region: Grand Est
- Department: Aube
- Arrondissement: Troyes
- Canton: Arcis-sur-Aube
- Intercommunality: Forêts, lacs, terres en Champagne

Government
  - Mayor (2020–2026): Alain Carre
- Area^{1}: 17.37 km^{2} (6.71 sq mi)
- Elevation: 150 m (490 ft)
- Population (2023): 466
  - Density: 26.8/km^{2} (69.5/sq mi)
- Time zone: UTC+01:00 (CET)
  - Summer (DST): UTC+02:00 (CEST)
- INSEE/Postal code: 10210 /10150
- ^{1} French Land Register data, which excludes lakes, ponds, glaciers > 1 km^{2} (0.386 sq mi or 247 acres) and river estuaries.

Luyères (French pronunciation: [lɥijɛʁ]) is a commune in the Aube department in north-central France.

== Population ==
Historical population
| Year | Pop. | ±% p.a. |
|---|---|---|
| 1968 | 227 | — |
| 1975 | 383 | +7.76% |
| 1982 | 383 | +0.00% |
| 1990 | 401 | +0.58% |
| 1999 | 382 | −0.54% |
| 2007 | 441 | +1.81% |
| 2012 | 431 | −0.46% |
| 2017 | 452 | +0.96% |
| 2023 | 466 | +0.51% |
Source: INSEE

== See also ==
- Communes of the Aube department
- Parc naturel régional de la Forêt d'Orient
