= Trouans =

Commune in Grand Est, France

- Commune
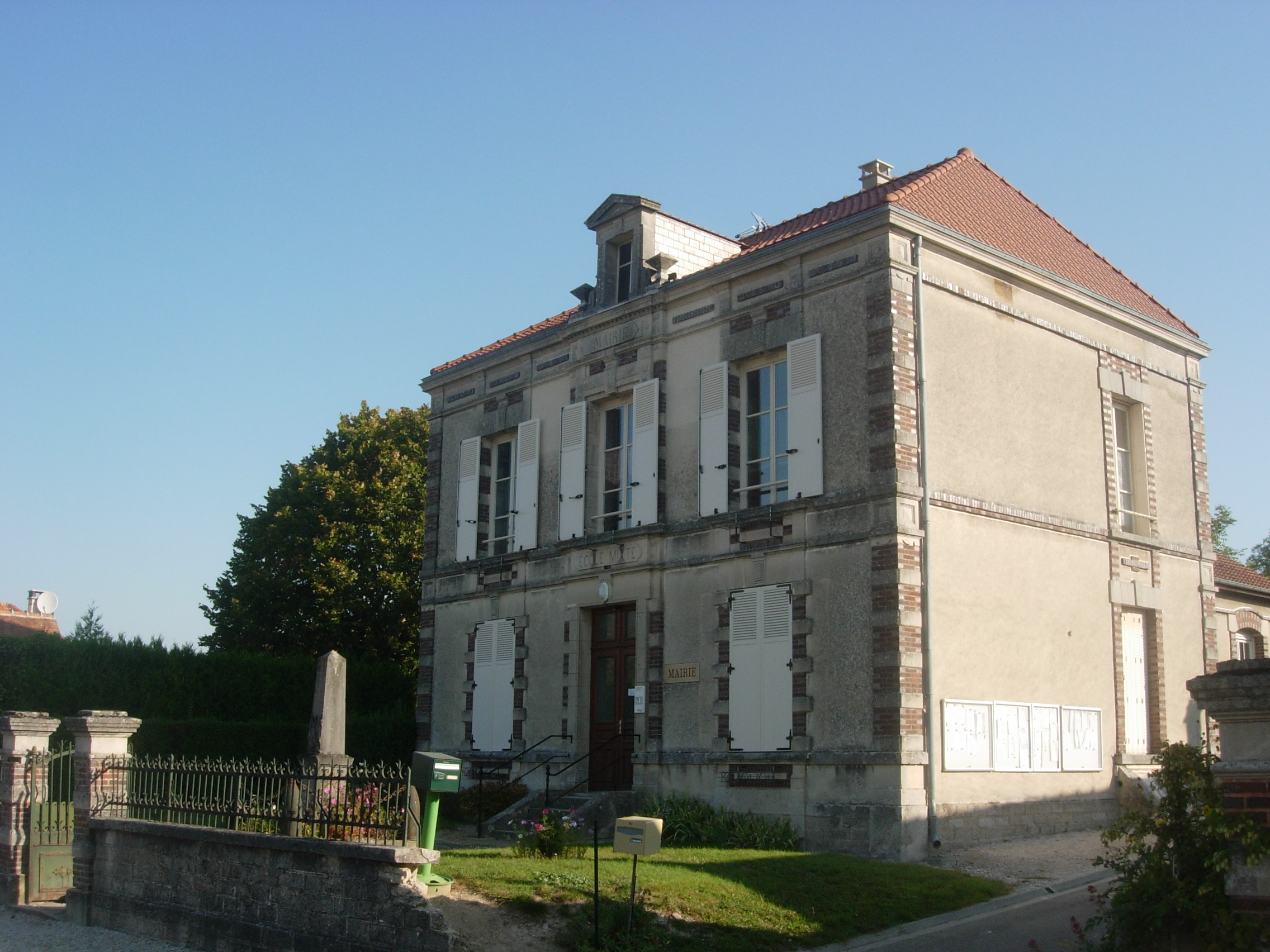
- The town hall in Trouans
- Location of Trouans
- Location within France Location within Grand Est
- Coordinates: 48°37′50″N 4°14′20″E
- Country: France
- Region: Grand Est
- Department: Aube
- Arrondissement: Troyes
- Canton: Arcis-sur-Aube

Government
  - Mayor (2022–2026): Philippe Lampson
- Area^{1}: 29.75 km^{2} (11.49 sq mi)
- Elevation: 110 m (360 ft)
- Population (2023): 200
  - Density: 6.7/km^{2} (17/sq mi)
- Time zone: UTC+01:00 (CET)
  - Summer (DST): UTC+02:00 (CEST)
- INSEE/Postal code: 10386 /10700
- ^{1} French Land Register data, which excludes lakes, ponds, glaciers > 1 km^{2} (0.386 sq mi or 247 acres) and river estuaries.

Trouans (French pronunciation: [tʁwɑ̃]) is a commune in the Aube department in north-central France. It was created in 1973 by the merger of two former communes: Trouan-le-Grand and Trouan-le-Petit.

== Population ==
Historical population
Year	Pop.	±% p.a.
1968	284	—
1975	268	−0.82%
1982	214	−3.16%
1990	199	−0.90%
1999	207	+0.44%
2007	227	+1.16%
2012	248	+1.79%
2017	228	−1.67%
2023	200	−2.16%
Source: INSEE

== See also ==
- Communes of the Aube department
