= Le Chêne =

Commune in Grand Est, France

- Commune
- Location of Le Chêne
- Location within France Location within Grand Est
- Coordinates: 48°33′00″N 4°10′39″E
- Country: France
- Region: Grand Est
- Department: Aube
- Arrondissement: Troyes
- Canton: Arcis-sur-Aube

Government
  - Mayor (2020–2026): Solange Gaudy
- Area^{1}: 21.01 km^{2} (8.11 sq mi)
- Elevation: 98 m (322 ft)
- Highest elevation: 163 m (535 ft)
- Lowest elevation: 86 m (282 ft)
- Population (2023): 277
  - Density: 13.2/km^{2} (34.1/sq mi)
- Time zone: UTC+01:00 (CET)
  - Summer (DST): UTC+02:00 (CEST)
- INSEE/Postal code: 10095 /10700
- ^{1} French Land Register data, which excludes lakes, ponds, glaciers > 1 km^{2} (0.386 sq mi or 247 acres) and river estuaries.

Le Chêne (French pronunciation: [lə ʃɛːn]) is a commune in the Aube department in north-central France.

== Population ==
Historical population
| Year | Pop. | ±% p.a. |
|---|---|---|
| 1968 | 225 | — |
| 1975 | 191 | −2.31% |
| 1982 | 229 | +2.63% |
| 1990 | 196 | −1.93% |
| 1999 | 198 | +0.11% |
| 2007 | 247 | +2.80% |
| 2012 | 307 | +4.45% |
| 2017 | 293 | −0.93% |
| 2023 | 277 | −0.93% |
Source: INSEE

== See also ==
- Communes of the Aube department
