= Saint-Nabord-sur-Aube =

Commune in Grand Est, France

- Commune
- Location of Saint-Nabord-sur-Aube
- Location within France Location within Grand Est
- Coordinates: 48°31′38″N 4°12′54″E
- Country: France
- Region: Grand Est
- Department: Aube
- Arrondissement: Troyes
- Canton: Arcis-sur-Aube

Government
  - Mayor (2020–2026): Dany Robin
- Area^{1}: 8.55 km^{2} (3.30 sq mi)
- Elevation: 96 m (315 ft)
- Population (2023): 140
  - Density: 16/km^{2} (42/sq mi)
- Time zone: UTC+01:00 (CET)
  - Summer (DST): UTC+02:00 (CEST)
- INSEE/Postal code: 10354 /10700
- ^{1} French Land Register data, which excludes lakes, ponds, glaciers > 1 km^{2} (0.386 sq mi or 247 acres) and river estuaries.

Saint-Nabord-sur-Aube (French pronunciation: [sɛ̃ nabɔʁ syʁ ob], literally Saint-Nabord on Aube) is a commune in the Aube department in north-central France.

== Population ==
Historical population
Year	Pop.	±% p.a.
1968	85	—
1975	100	+2.35%
1982	96	−0.58%
1990	131	+3.96%
1999	122	−0.79%
2007	127	+0.50%
2012	136	+1.38%
2017	139	+0.44%
2023	140	+0.12%
Source: INSEE

== See also ==
- Communes of the Aube department
