= Coclois =

Commune in Grand Est, France

- Commune
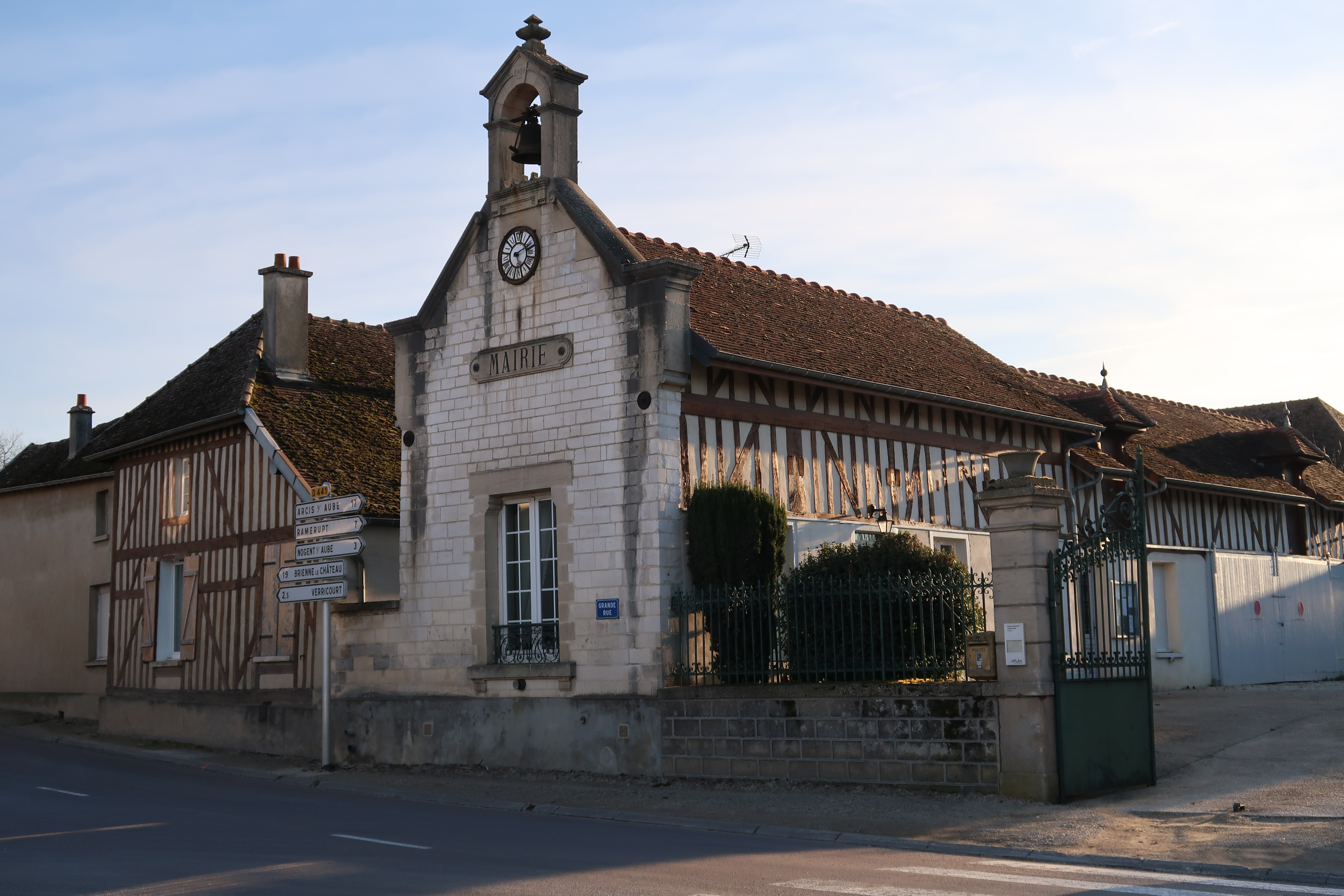

- Coat of arms
- Location of Coclois
- Location within France Location within Grand Est
- Coordinates: 48°28′24″N 4°20′18″E
- Country: France
- Region: Grand Est
- Department: Aube
- Arrondissement: Troyes
- Canton: Arcis-sur-Aube

Government
  - Mayor (2020–2026): Patrick Maufroy
- Area^{1}: 6.92 km^{2} (2.67 sq mi)
- Elevation: 105 m (344 ft)
- Population (2023): 170
  - Density: 25/km^{2} (64/sq mi)
- Time zone: UTC+01:00 (CET)
  - Summer (DST): UTC+02:00 (CEST)
- INSEE/Postal code: 10101 /10240
- ^{1} French Land Register data, which excludes lakes, ponds, glaciers > 1 km^{2} (0.386 sq mi or 247 acres) and river estuaries.

Coclois (French pronunciation: [kɔklwa]) is a commune in the Aube department in north-central France.

== Population ==
Historical population
| Year | Pop. | ±% p.a. |
|---|---|---|
| 1968 | 125 | — |
| 1975 | 127 | +0.23% |
| 1982 | 122 | −0.57% |
| 1990 | 123 | +0.10% |
| 1999 | 143 | +1.69% |
| 2007 | 184 | +3.20% |
| 2012 | 182 | −0.22% |
| 2017 | 178 | −0.44% |
| 2023 | 170 | −0.76% |
Source: INSEE

== See also ==
- Communes of the Aube department
