= Montsuzain =

Commune in Grand Est, France

- Commune
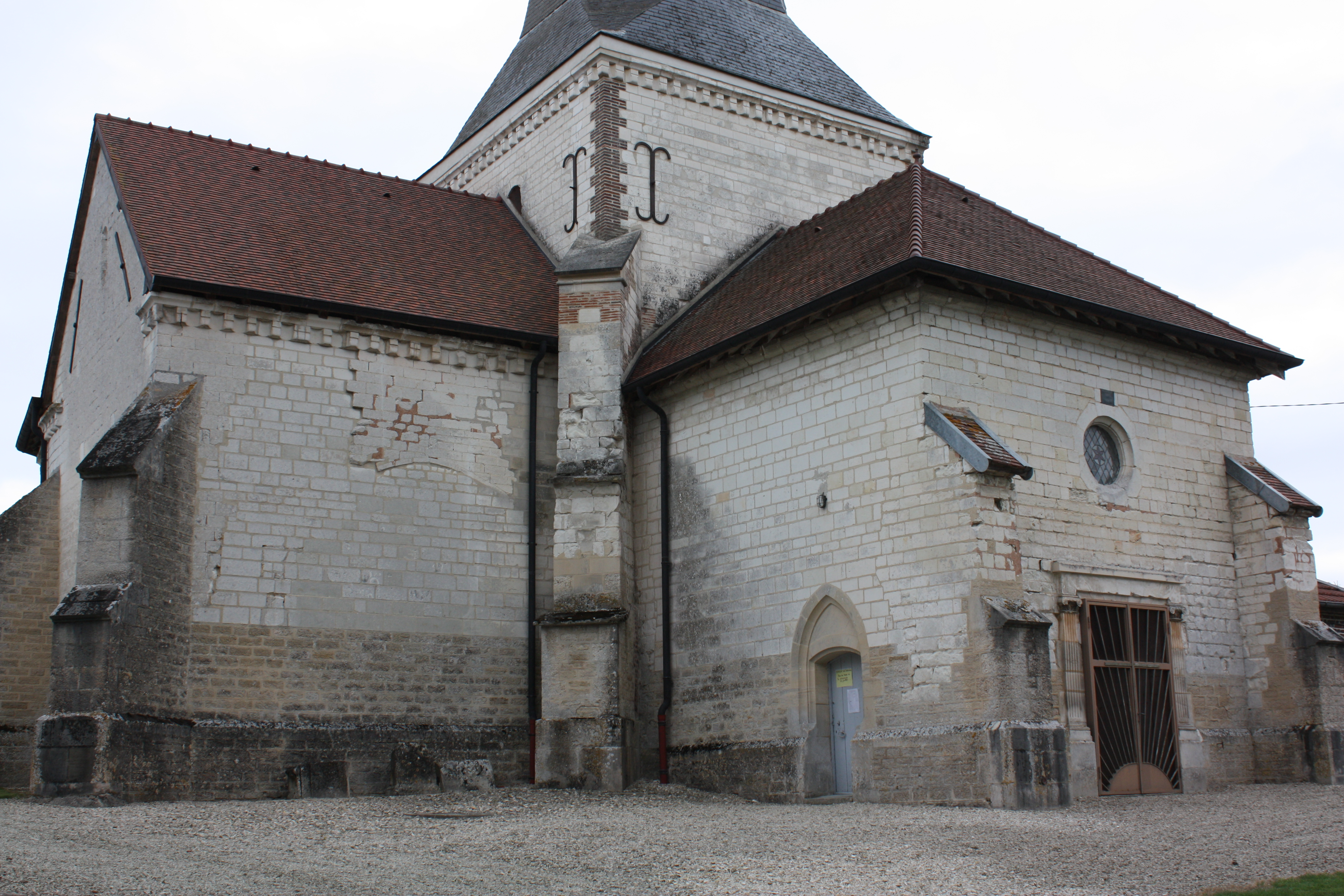
- The church in Montsuzain
- Location of Montsuzain
- Location within France Location within Grand Est
- Coordinates: 48°26′41″N 4°07′59″E
- Country: France
- Region: Grand Est
- Department: Aube
- Arrondissement: Troyes
- Canton: Arcis-sur-Aube
- Intercommunality: CA Troyes Champagne Métropole

Government
  - Mayor (2020–2026): Guy Delaitre
- Area^{1}: 19.62 km^{2} (7.58 sq mi)
- Elevation: 120 m (390 ft)
- Population (2023): 391
  - Density: 19.9/km^{2} (51.6/sq mi)
- Time zone: UTC+01:00 (CET)
  - Summer (DST): UTC+02:00 (CEST)
- INSEE/Postal code: 10256 /10150
- ^{1} French Land Register data, which excludes lakes, ponds, glaciers > 1 km^{2} (0.386 sq mi or 247 acres) and river estuaries.

Montsuzain (French pronunciation: [mɔ̃syzɛ̃]) is a commune in the Aube department in north-central France.

== Population ==
Historical population
Year	Pop.	±% p.a.
1968	226	—
1975	246	+1.22%
1982	241	−0.29%
1990	284	+2.07%
1999	286	+0.08%
2007	335	+2.00%
2012	392	+3.19%
2017	409	+0.85%
2023	391	−0.75%
Source: INSEE

== See also ==
- Communes of the Aube department
