= Charmont-sous-Barbuise =

Commune in Grand Est, France

- Commune
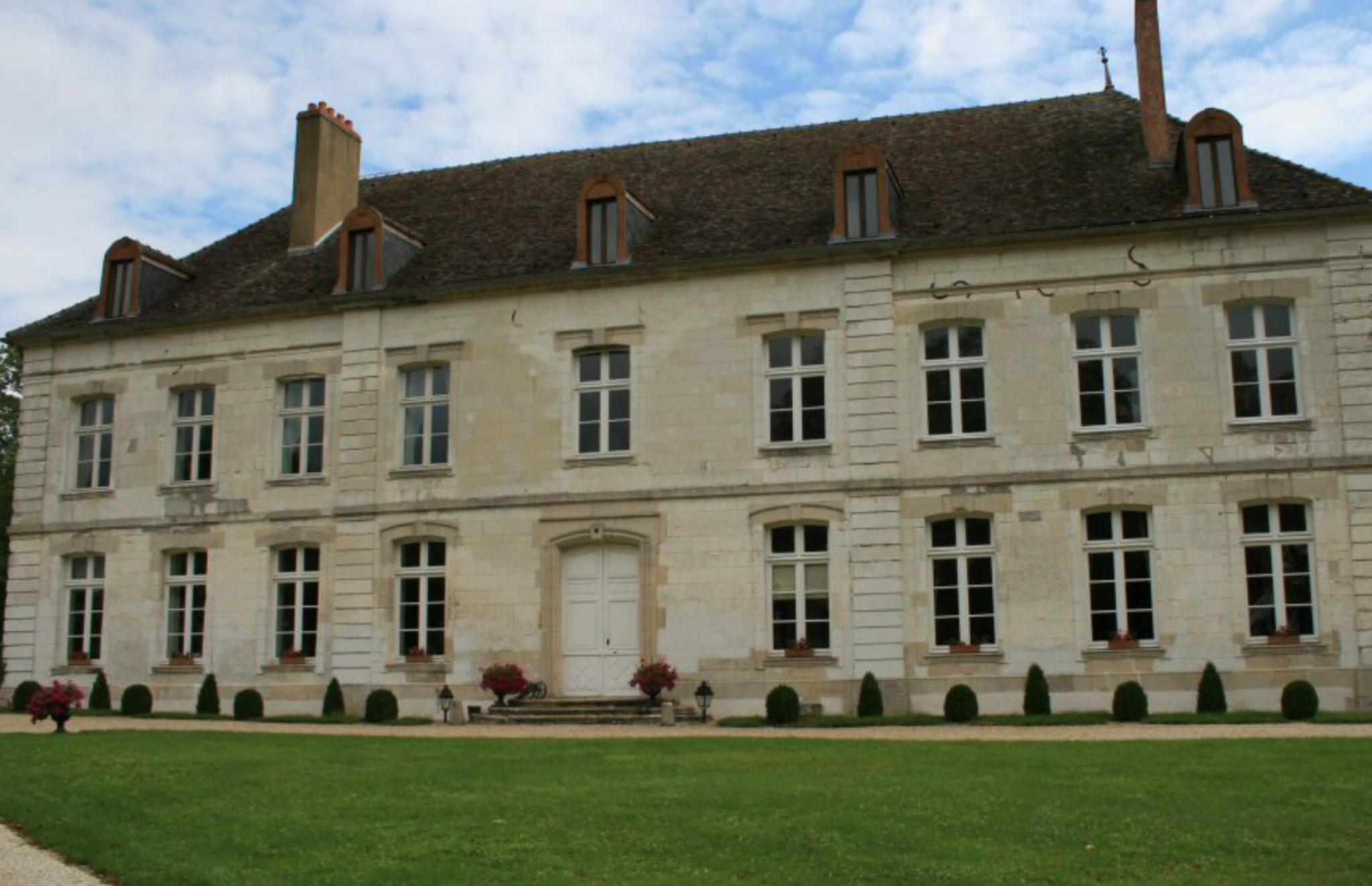
- The chateau in Charmont-sous-Barbuise

- Coat of arms
- Location of Charmont-sous-Barbuise
- Location within France Location within Grand Est
- Coordinates: 48°24′33″N 4°10′30″E
- Country: France
- Region: Grand Est
- Department: Aube
- Arrondissement: Troyes
- Canton: Arcis-sur-Aube

Government
  - Mayor (2020–2026): Liliane Battelier
- Area^{1}: 38.33 km^{2} (14.80 sq mi)
- Elevation: 134 m (440 ft)
- Population (2023): 1,053
  - Density: 27.47/km^{2} (71.15/sq mi)
- Time zone: UTC+01:00 (CET)
  - Summer (DST): UTC+02:00 (CEST)
- INSEE/Postal code: 10084 /10150
- ^{1} French Land Register data, which excludes lakes, ponds, glaciers > 1 km^{2} (0.386 sq mi or 247 acres) and river estuaries.

Charmont-sous-Barbuise (French pronunciation: [ʃaʁmɔ̃ su baʁbɥiz]) is a commune in the Aube department, north central France.

Historical population
Year	Pop.	±% p.a.
1968	574	—
1975	525	−1.27%
1982	608	+2.12%
1990	648	+0.80%
1999	676	+0.47%
2007	902	+3.67%
2012	1,046	+3.01%
2017	1,017	−0.56%
2023	1,053	+0.58%
Source: INSEE

== Château de Charmont-sous-Barbuise ==
The château of Charmont-sous-Barbuise was originally a fortified manor house, mentioned in 1233. In 1539 it was described as "the motte of the Coulaverdey manor, which once had a castle, surrounded by a trench, is presently fallen into ruin". It was rebuilt in 1550, and the last château was constructed by Joseph-Aimé Hennequin in 1725. The site was registered as a Monument historique in 1988.

== See also ==
- Communes of the Aube department
