= Nozay, Aube =

Commune in Grand Est, France

Nozay
- Commune
- Location of Nozay
- Location within France Location within Grand Est
- Coordinates: 48°30′33″N 4°05′47″E
- Country: France
- Region: Grand Est
- Department: Aube
- Arrondissement: Troyes
- Canton: Arcis-sur-Aube

Government
  - Mayor (2020–2026): Denis Simphal
- Area^{1}: 15.75 km^{2} (6.08 sq mi)
- Elevation: 96 m (315 ft)
- Highest elevation: 144 m (472 ft)
- Lowest elevation: 89 m (292 ft)
- Population (2023): 160
  - Density: 10/km^{2} (26/sq mi)
- Time zone: UTC+01:00 (CET)
  - Summer (DST): UTC+02:00 (CEST)
- INSEE/Postal code: 10269 /10700
- ^{1} French Land Register data, which excludes lakes, ponds, glaciers > 1 km^{2} (0.386 sq mi or 247 acres) and river estuaries.

Nozay (French pronunciation: [nɔzɛ]) is a commune in the Aube department in north-central France.

== Population ==
Historical population
Year	Pop.	±% p.a.
1968	160	—
1975	145	−1.40%
1982	131	−1.44%
1990	118	−1.30%
1999	109	−0.88%
2007	131	+2.32%
2012	141	+1.48%
2017	148	+0.97%
2023	160	+1.31%
Source: INSEE

== See also ==
- Communes of the Aube department
