= Feuges =

Commune in Grand Est, France

- Commune
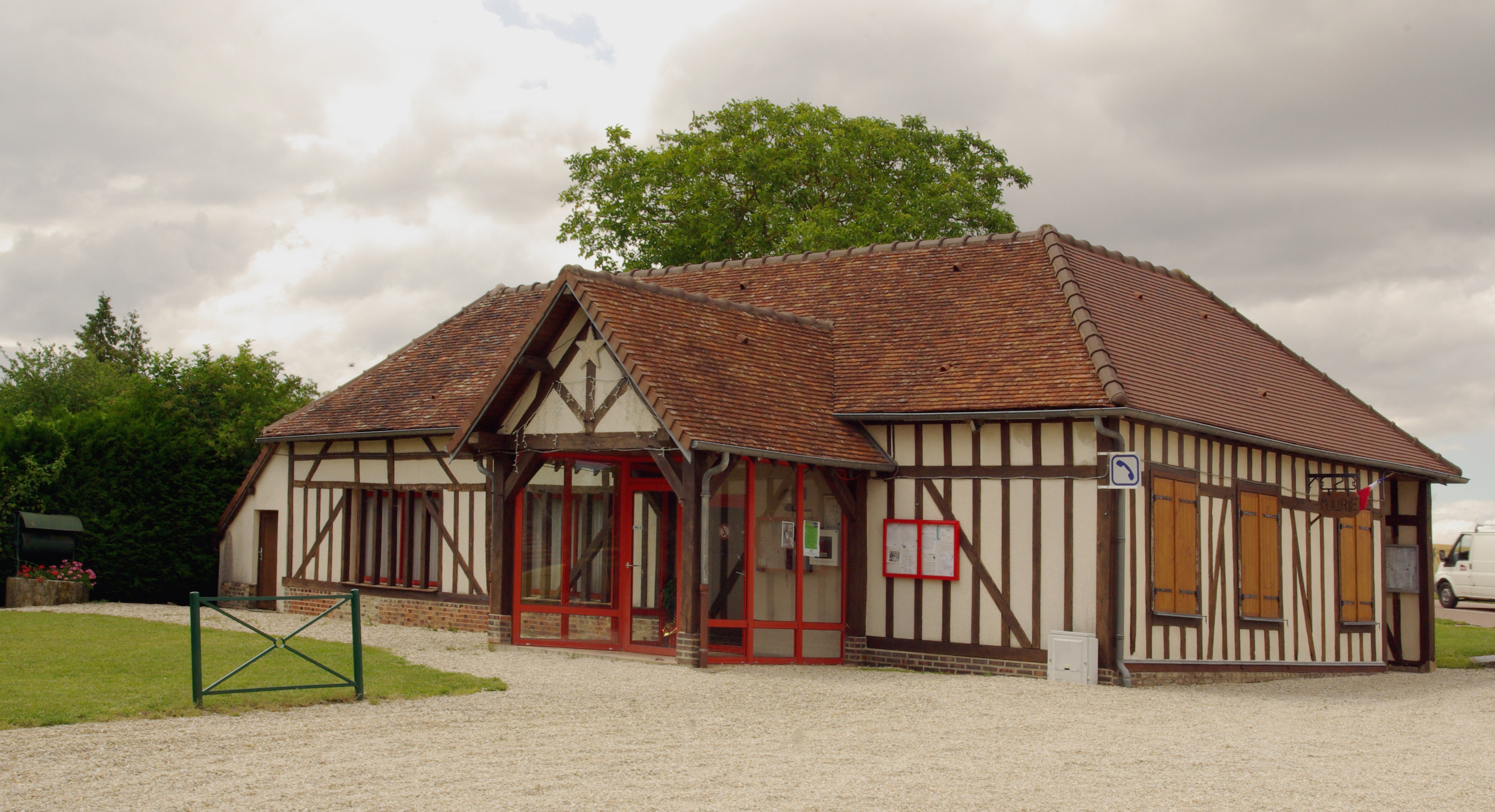
- The town hall in Feuges
- Location of Feuges
- Location within France Location within Grand Est
- Coordinates: 48°23′54″N 4°06′37″E
- Country: France
- Region: Grand Est
- Department: Aube
- Arrondissement: Troyes
- Canton: Arcis-sur-Aube
- Intercommunality: CA Troyes Champagne Métropole

Government
  - Mayor (2020–2026): Sonia Meirhaeghe
- Area^{1}: 10.99 km^{2} (4.24 sq mi)
- Elevation: 159 m (522 ft)
- Population (2023): 330
  - Density: 30/km^{2} (78/sq mi)
- Time zone: UTC+01:00 (CET)
  - Summer (DST): UTC+02:00 (CEST)
- INSEE/Postal code: 10149 /10150
- ^{1} French Land Register data, which excludes lakes, ponds, glaciers > 1 km^{2} (0.386 sq mi or 247 acres) and river estuaries.

Feuges (French pronunciation: [føʒ]) is a commune in the Aube department in north-central France.

== Population ==
Historical population
Year	Pop.	±% p.a.
1968	72	—
1975	81	+1.70%
1982	221	+15.42%
1990	231	+0.55%
1999	206	−1.26%
2007	200	−0.37%
2012	291	+7.79%
2017	332	+2.67%
2023	330	−0.10%
Source: INSEE

== See also ==
- Communes of the Aube department
