= Mesnil-Lettre =

Commune in Grand Est, France

- Commune
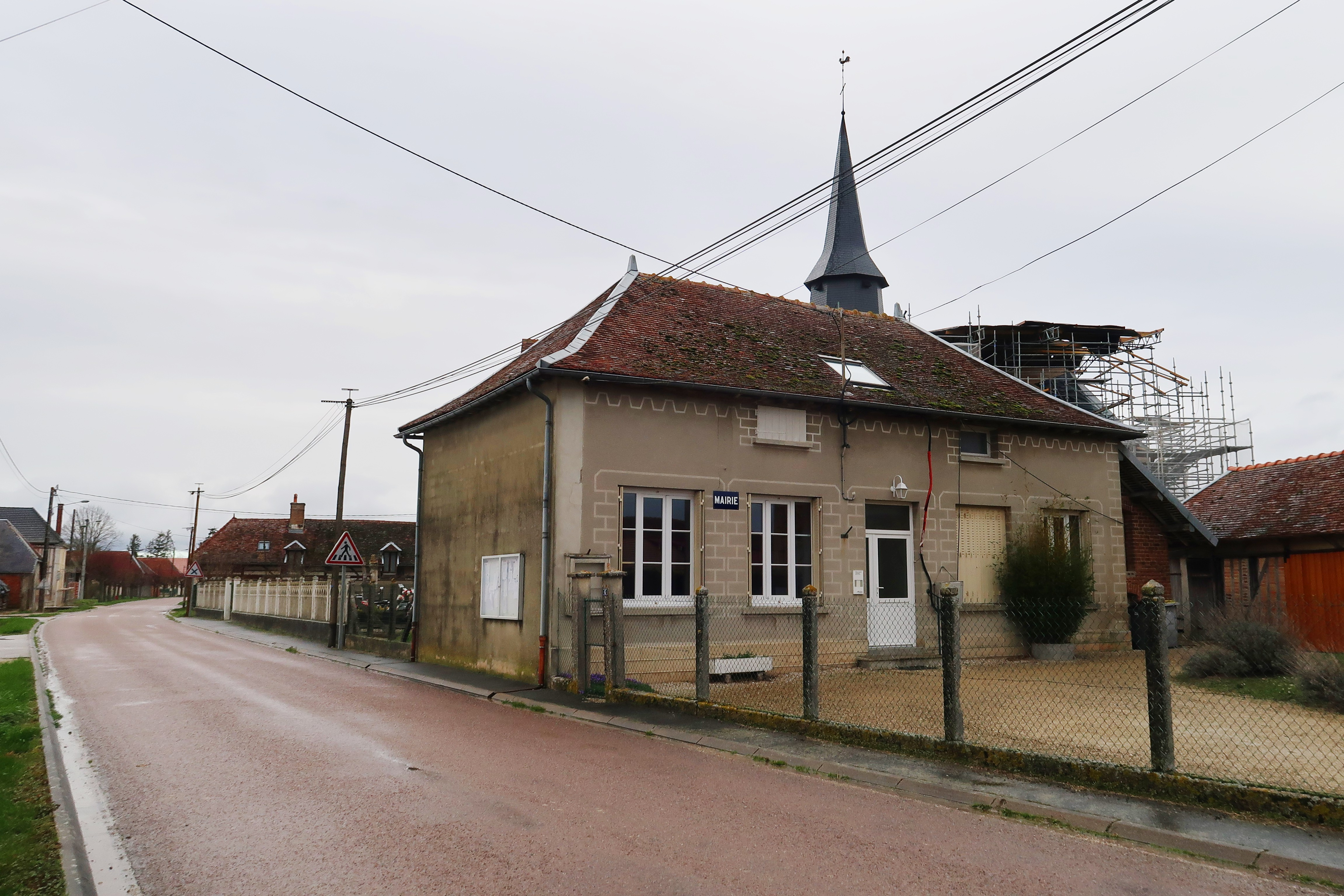
- Town hall
- Location of Mesnil-Lettre
- Location within France Location within Grand Est
- Coordinates: 48°27′24″N 4°16′02″E
- Country: France
- Region: Grand Est
- Department: Aube
- Arrondissement: Troyes
- Canton: Arcis-sur-Aube

Government
  - Mayor (2020–2026): Jean-Pierre Petitet
- Area^{1}: 8.89 km^{2} (3.43 sq mi)
- Elevation: 122 m (400 ft)
- Population (2023): 57
  - Density: 6.4/km^{2} (17/sq mi)
- Time zone: UTC+01:00 (CET)
  - Summer (DST): UTC+02:00 (CEST)
- INSEE/Postal code: 10236 /10240
- ^{1} French Land Register data, which excludes lakes, ponds, glaciers > 1 km^{2} (0.386 sq mi or 247 acres) and river estuaries.

Mesnil-Lettre (French pronunciation: [mɛnil lɛtʁ]) is a commune in the Aube department in north-central France.

== Population ==
Historical population
Year	Pop.	±% p.a.
1968	61	—
1975	47	−3.66%
1982	34	−4.52%
1990	48	+4.40%
1999	47	−0.23%
2007	59	+2.88%
2012	59	+0.00%
2017	58	−0.34%
2023	57	−0.29%
Source: INSEE

== See also ==
- Communes of the Aube department
