= Longsols =

Commune in Grand Est, France

- Commune
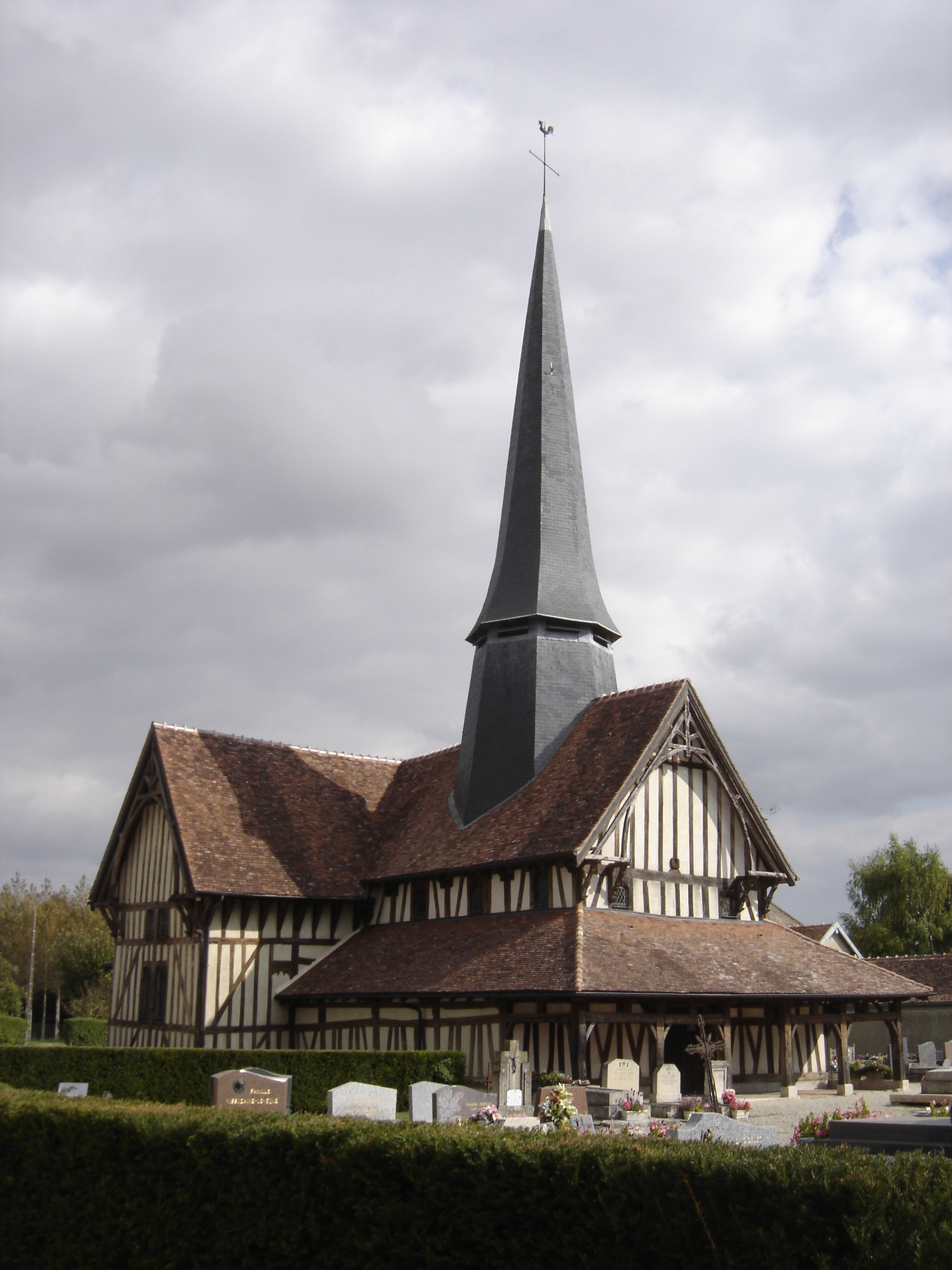
- The church in Longsols
- Location of Longsols
- Location within France Location within Grand Est
- Coordinates: 48°25′55″N 4°17′14″E
- Country: France
- Region: Grand Est
- Department: Aube
- Arrondissement: Troyes
- Canton: Arcis-sur-Aube

Government
  - Mayor (2023–2026): Etienne Geoffrin
- Area^{1}: 12.61 km^{2} (4.87 sq mi)
- Elevation: 111 m (364 ft)
- Population (2023): 129
  - Density: 10.2/km^{2} (26.5/sq mi)
- Time zone: UTC+01:00 (CET)
  - Summer (DST): UTC+02:00 (CEST)
- INSEE/Postal code: 10206 /10240
- ^{1} French Land Register data, which excludes lakes, ponds, glaciers > 1 km^{2} (0.386 sq mi or 247 acres) and river estuaries.

Longsols (French pronunciation: [lɔ̃sɔl]) is a commune in the Aube department in north-central France.

== Population ==
Historical population
Year	Pop.	±% p.a.
1968	181	—
1975	169	−0.98%
1982	147	−1.97%
1990	137	−0.88%
1999	131	−0.50%
2007	126	−0.49%
2012	124	−0.32%
2017	125	+0.16%
2023	129	+0.53%
Source: INSEE

== See also ==
- Communes of the Aube department
