= Pougy =

Commune in Grand Est, France

- Commune
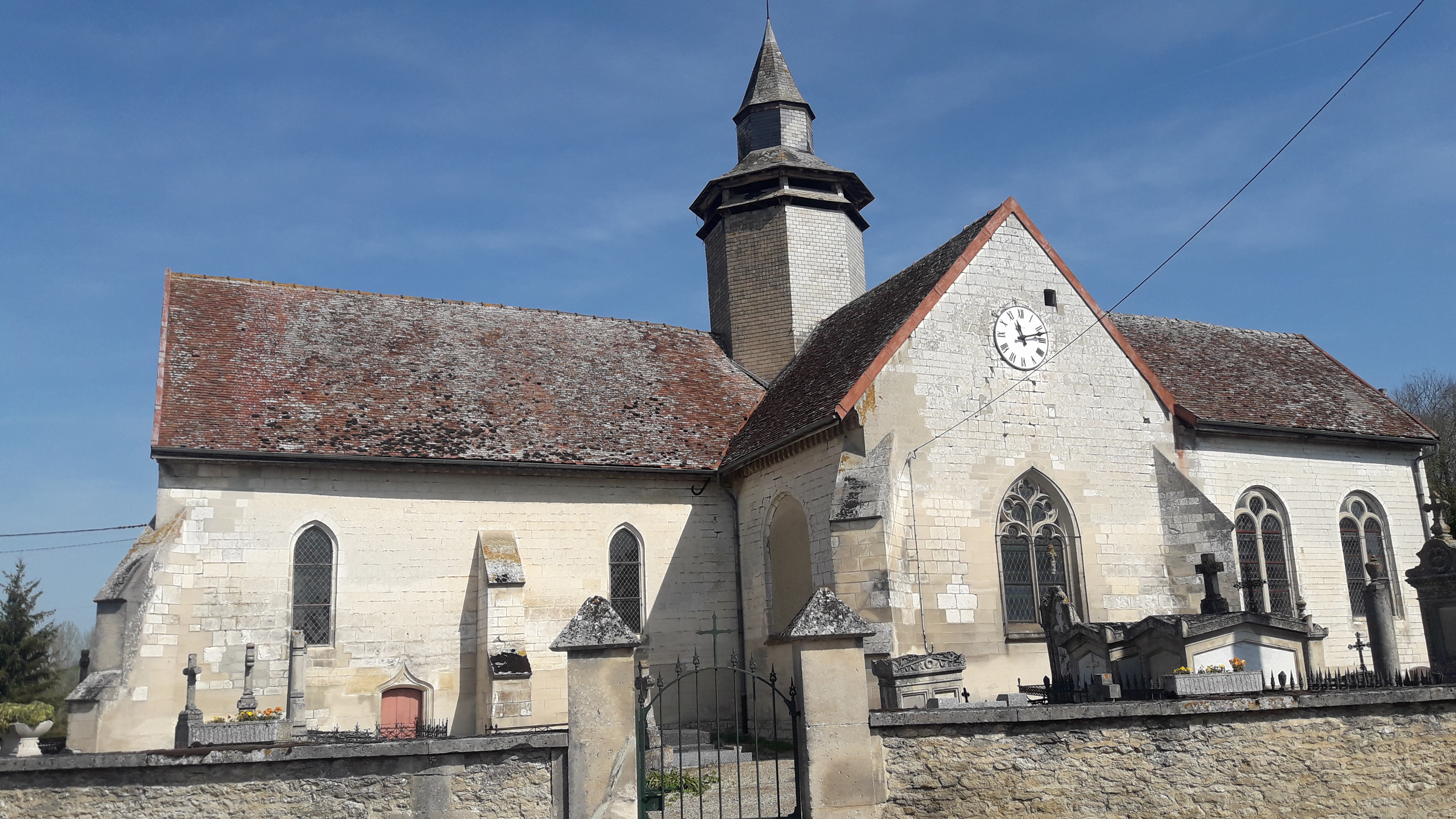
- The church in Pougy

- Coat of arms
- Location of Pougy
- Location within France Location within Grand Est
- Coordinates: 48°26′52″N 4°21′25″E
- Country: France
- Region: Grand Est
- Department: Aube
- Arrondissement: Troyes
- Canton: Arcis-sur-Aube

Government
  - Mayor (2020–2026): Sophie Autréau
- Area^{1}: 8.96 km^{2} (3.46 sq mi)
- Elevation: 110 m (360 ft)
- Population (2023): 255
  - Density: 28.5/km^{2} (73.7/sq mi)
- Time zone: UTC+01:00 (CET)
  - Summer (DST): UTC+02:00 (CEST)
- INSEE/Postal code: 10300 /10240
- ^{1} French Land Register data, which excludes lakes, ponds, glaciers > 1 km^{2} (0.386 sq mi or 247 acres) and river estuaries.

Pougy (French pronunciation: [puʒi]) is a commune in the Aube department in north-central France.

== Population ==
Historical population
Year	Pop.	±% p.a.
1968	261	—
1975	238	−1.31%
1982	242	+0.24%
1990	213	−1.58%
1999	245	+1.57%
2007	272	+1.32%
2012	288	+1.15%
2017	290	+0.14%
2023	255	−2.12%
Source: INSEE

== See also ==
- Communes of the Aube department
