= Nogent-sur-Aube =

Commune in Grand Est, France

- Commune
- Coat of arms
- Location of Nogent-sur-Aube
- Location within France Location within Grand Est
- Coordinates: 48°29′41″N 4°18′34″E
- Country: France
- Region: Grand Est
- Department: Aube
- Arrondissement: Troyes
- Canton: Arcis-sur-Aube

Government
  - Mayor (2020–2026): Jean-Claude Fevre
- Area^{1}: 16.03 km^{2} (6.19 sq mi)
- Elevation: 104 m (341 ft)
- Population (2023): 313
  - Density: 19.5/km^{2} (50.6/sq mi)
- Time zone: UTC+01:00 (CET)
  - Summer (DST): UTC+02:00 (CEST)
- INSEE/Postal code: 10267 /10240
- ^{1} French Land Register data, which excludes lakes, ponds, glaciers > 1 km^{2} (0.386 sq mi or 247 acres) and river estuaries.

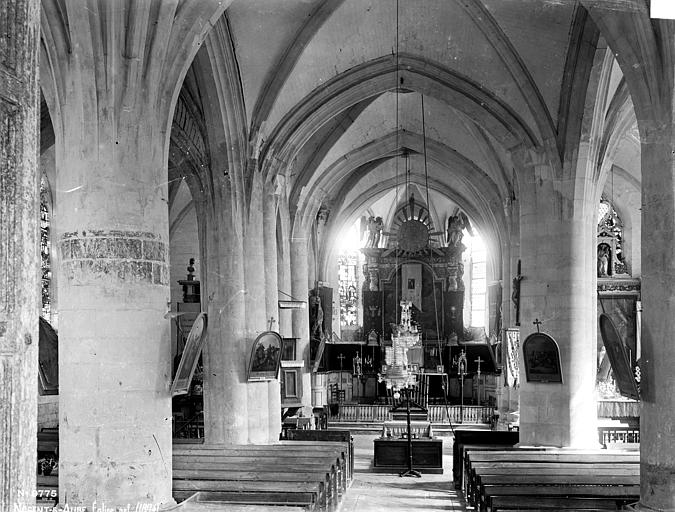
Nogent-sur-Aube - Médiathèque de l'architecture et du patrimoine

Nogent-sur-Aube (French pronunciation: [nɔʒɑ̃ syʁ ob], literally Nogent on Aube) is a commune in the Aube department in north-central France.

== Population ==
Historical population
Year	Pop.	±% p.a.
1968	314	—
1975	324	+0.45%
1982	317	−0.31%
1990	311	−0.24%
1999	316	+0.18%
2007	347	+1.18%
2012	349	+0.12%
2017	322	−1.60%
2023	313	−0.47%
Source: INSEE

== See also ==
- Communes of the Aube department
