= Canton of Arcis-sur-Aube =

Coordinates: 48.5347°N 4.1397°E

Arcis-sur-Aube
- Canton
- Interactive map of Arcis-sur-Aube
- Country: France
- Region: Grand Est
- Department: Aube
- No. of communes: {{{nbcomm}}}

Government
  - Representatives (2021–2028): Guy Bernier and Annie Soucat
- Area: 748.39 km^{2} (288.95 sq mi)
- Population (2023): 14,942
  - Density: 19.966/km^{2} (51.710/sq mi)
- INSEE code: 1002

The canton of Arcis-sur-Aube is one of the 17 cantons of the Aube department, in northern France. Its INSEE code is 1002. Its population was 14,661 in 2017.

The canton of Arcis-sur-Aube was created in 1801. At the French canton reorganisation which came into effect in March 2015, the canton was expanded from 22 to 47 communes. Arcis-sur-Aube was extended by the communes of the canton Ramerupt (24 communes) and Piney (1 commune).

== Communes ==
There are 47 communes in canton of Arcis-sur-Aube:

INSEE	Postal	Commune	Population (2012)	Area	Density
10004	10700	Allibaudières	261	24,13	10,8
10006	10700	Arcis-sur-Aube	2975	9,49	313,5
10021	10240	Avant-lès-Ramerupt	152	20,77	7,3
10015	10150	Aubeterre	293	11,66	25,1
10065	10240	Brillecourt	96	5,73	16,8
10077	10700	Champigny-sur-Aube	94	6,71	14
10084	10150	Charmont-sous-Barbuise	1046	38,33	27,3
10091	10240	Chaudrey	158	13,68	11,5
10101	10240	Coclois	182	6,92	26,3
10121	10240	Dampierre	292	29,36	9,9
10127	10240	Dommartin-le-Coq	65	6,34	10,3
10130	10700	Dosnon	118	28,69	4,1
10174	10240	Isle-Aubigny	168	18,76	9
10149	10150	Feuges	291	10,99	26,5
10167	10700	Grandville	112	9,24	12,1
10172	10700	Herbisse	176	22,04	8
10095	10700	Le Chêne	307	21,01	14,6
10195	10700	Lhuître	294	35,82	8,2
10206	10240	Longsols	124	12,61	9,8
10210	10150	Luyères	431	17,37	24,8
10216	10230	Mailly-le-Camp	1787	42,7	41,9
10235	10700	Mesnil-la-Comtesse	35	0,95	36,8
10236	10240	Mesnil-Lettre	59	8,89	6,6
10256	10150	Montsuzain	392	19,62	20
10257	10240	Morembert	40	2,5	16
10267	10240	Nogent-sur-Aube	349	16,03	21,8
10269	10700	Nozay	141	15,75	9
10272	10700	Ormes	198	10,14	19,5
10273	10700	Ortillon	29	8,02	3,6
10293	10700	Poivres	149	42,51	3,5
10299	10700	Pouan-les-Vallées	532	16,61	32
10300	10240	Pougy	288	8,96	32,1
10314	10240	Ramerupt	375	13,6	27,6
10369	10700	Semoine	228	22,55	10,1
10354	10700	Saint-Nabord-sur-Aube	136	8,55	15,9
10361	10700	Saint-Remy-sous-Barbuise	203	15,57	13
10338	10700	Saint-Étienne-sous-Barbuise	144	10,84	13,3
10379	10700	Torcy-le-Grand	440	7,54	58,4
10380	10700	Torcy-le-Petit	81	7,29	11,1
10386	10700	Trouans	248	29,75	8,3
10398	10240	Vaucogne	76	16,51	4,6
10400	10700	Vaupoisson	137	10,79	12,7
10405	10240	Verricourt	42	6,93	6,1
10429	10700	Villette-sur-Aube	261	7,28	35,9
10430	10700	Villiers-Herbisse	88	26,44	3,3
10436	10700	Vinets	180	9,17	19,6
10442	10150	Voué	621	13,25	46,9
