= Torcy-le-Grand, Aube =

Commune in Grand Est, France

Torcy-le-Grand
- Commune
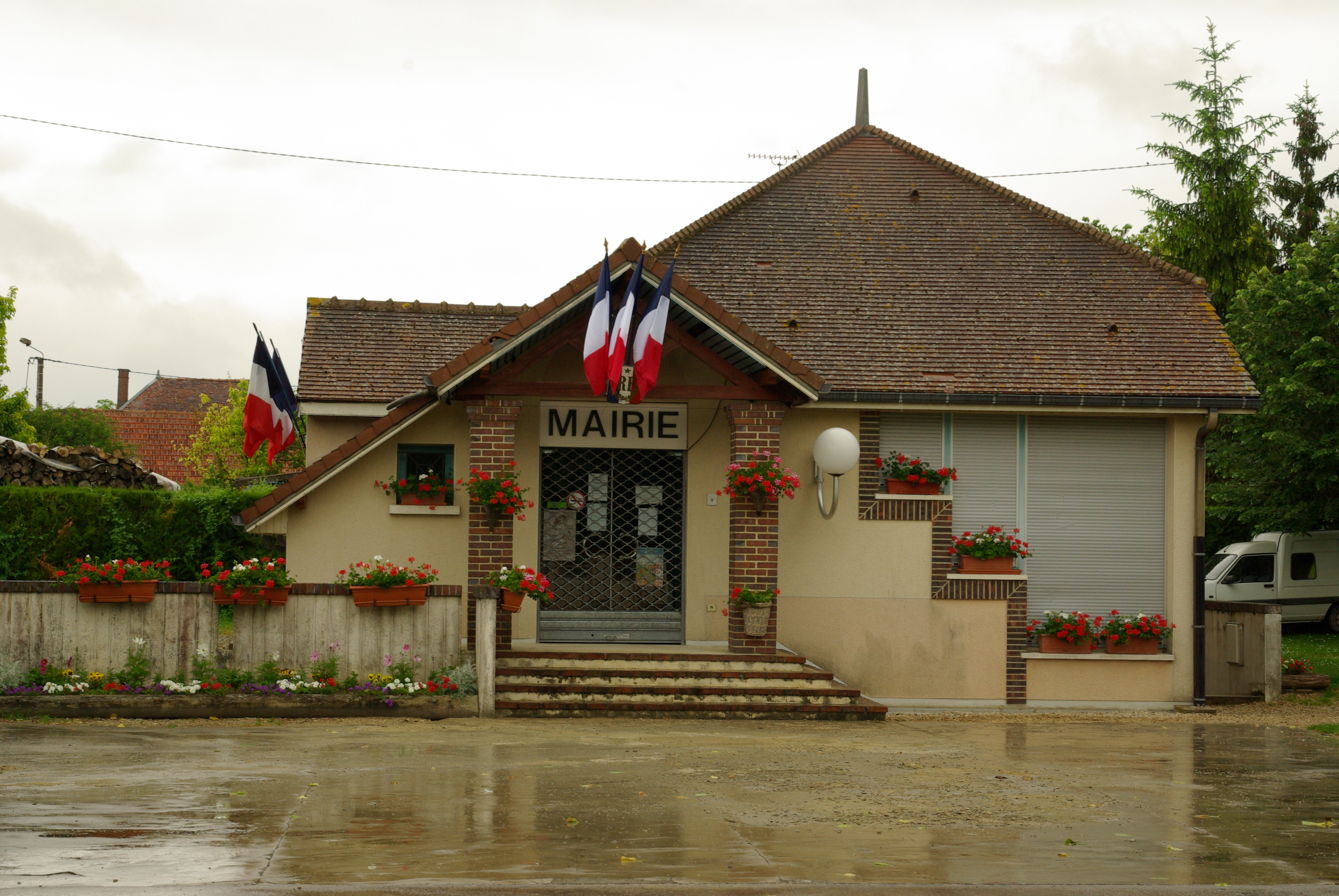
- Town hall
- Location of Torcy-le-Grand
- Location within France Location within Grand Est
- Coordinates: 48°32′03″N 4°10′16″E
- Country: France
- Region: Grand Est
- Department: Aube
- Arrondissement: Troyes
- Canton: Arcis-sur-Aube

Government
  - Mayor (2020–2026): Gérard Guerre-Genton
- Area^{1}: 7.54 km^{2} (2.91 sq mi)
- Elevation: 97 m (318 ft)
- Highest elevation: 145 m (476 ft)
- Lowest elevation: 87 m (285 ft)
- Population (2023): 433
  - Density: 57.4/km^{2} (149/sq mi)
- Time zone: UTC+01:00 (CET)
  - Summer (DST): UTC+02:00 (CEST)
- INSEE/Postal code: 10379 /10700
- ^{1} French Land Register data, which excludes lakes, ponds, glaciers > 1 km^{2} (0.386 sq mi or 247 acres) and river estuaries.

Torcy-le-Grand (French pronunciation: [tɔʁsi lə ɡʁɑ̃]) is a commune in the Aube department in north-central France.

== Population ==
Historical population
Year	Pop.	±% p.a.
1968	254	—
1975	343	+4.38%
1982	401	+2.26%
1990	414	+0.40%
1999	414	+0.00%
2007	422	+0.24%
2012	440	+0.84%
2017	443	+0.14%
2023	433	−0.38%
Source: INSEE

== See also ==
- Communes of the Aube department
