= Torcy-le-Petit, Aube =

Commune in Grand Est, France

Torcy-le-Petit
- Commune
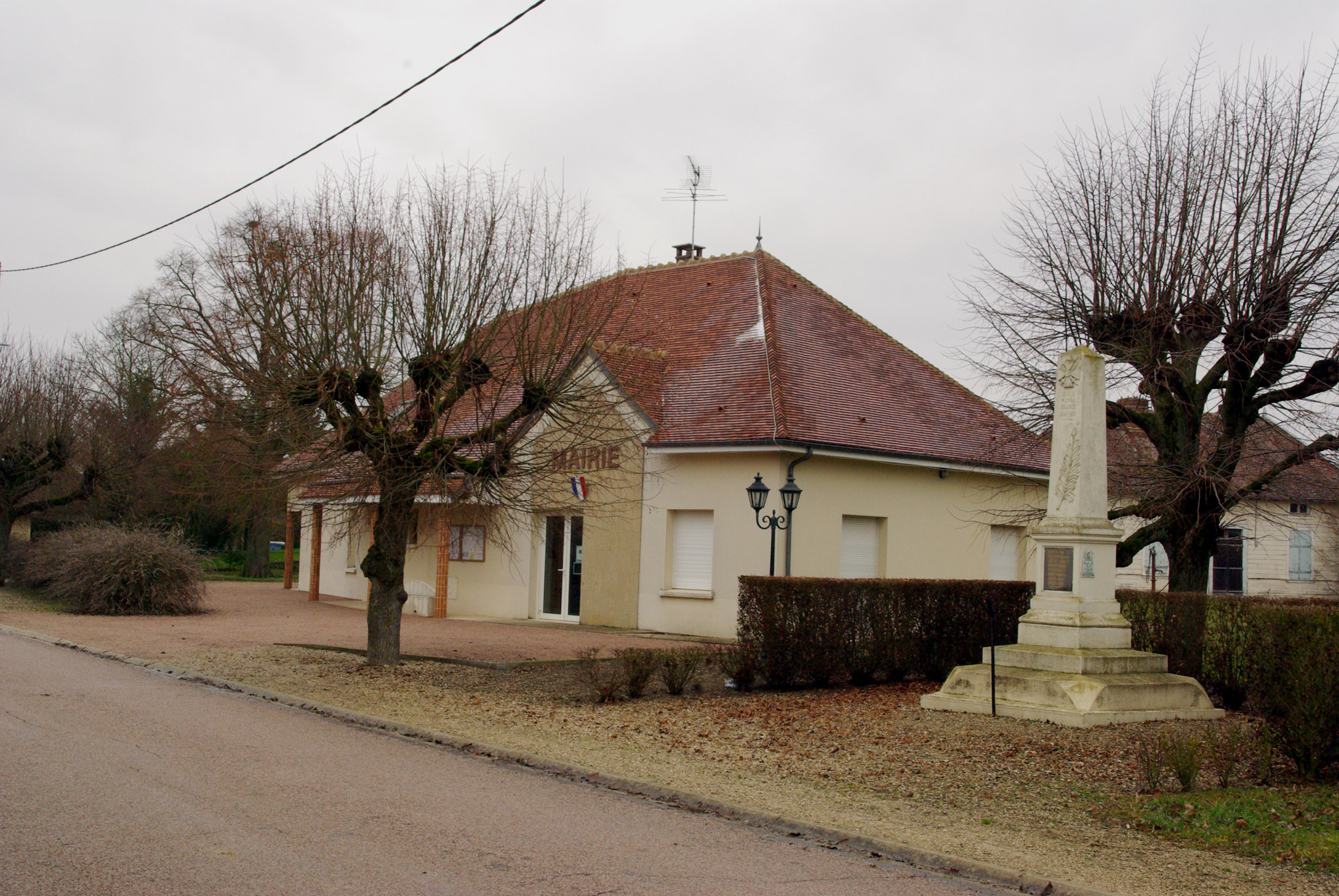
- Town hall
- Location of Torcy-le-Petit
- Location within France Location within Grand Est
- Coordinates: 48°31′57″N 4°11′41″E
- Country: France
- Region: Grand Est
- Department: Aube
- Arrondissement: Troyes
- Canton: Arcis-sur-Aube

Government
  - Mayor (2020–2026): Jean-Pierre Brisbard
- Area^{1}: 7.29 km^{2} (2.81 sq mi)
- Elevation: 94 m (308 ft)
- Highest elevation: 145 m (476 ft)
- Lowest elevation: 89 m (292 ft)
- Population (2023): 72
  - Density: 9.9/km^{2} (26/sq mi)
- Time zone: UTC+01:00 (CET)
  - Summer (DST): UTC+02:00 (CEST)
- INSEE/Postal code: 10380 /10700
- ^{1} French Land Register data, which excludes lakes, ponds, glaciers > 1 km^{2} (0.386 sq mi or 247 acres) and river estuaries.

Torcy-le-Petit (French pronunciation: [tɔʁsi lə pəti]) is a commune in the Aube department in north-central France.

== Population ==
Historical population
| Year | Pop. | ±% p.a. |
|---|---|---|
| 1968 | 60 | — |
| 1975 | 63 | +0.70% |
| 1982 | 65 | +0.45% |
| 1990 | 86 | +3.56% |
| 1999 | 84 | −0.26% |
| 2007 | 80 | −0.61% |
| 2012 | 81 | +0.25% |
| 2017 | 82 | +0.25% |
| 2023 | 72 | −2.14% |
Source: INSEE

== See also ==
- Communes of the Aube department
