= Marolles =

Marolles may refer to the following places:

== France ==
- Marolles, Calvados, in the Calvados département
- Marolles, Loir-et-Cher, in the Loir-et-Cher département
- Marolles, Marne, in the Marne département
- Marolles, Oise, in the Oise département
- Marolles-en-Beauce, in the Essonne département
- Marolles-en-Brie, Seine-et-Marne, in the Seine-et-Marne département
- Marolles-en-Brie, Val-de-Marne, in the Val-de-Marne département
- Marolles-en-Hurepoix, in the Essonne département
- Marolles-lès-Bailly, in the Aube département
- Marolles-les-Braults, in the Sarthe département
- Marolles-les-Buis, in the Eure-et-Loir département
- Marolles-lès-Saint-Calais, in the Sarthe département
- Marolles-sous-Lignières, in the Aube département
- Marolles-sur-Seine, in the Seine-et-Marne département

== Belgium ==
- Marolles (Brussels), a district in Brussels, Belgium

== See also ==
- Maroilles (disambiguation)
- Marols, the dialect spoken in the Marolles district of Brussels
