= Avreuil =

Commune in Grand Est, France

- Commune
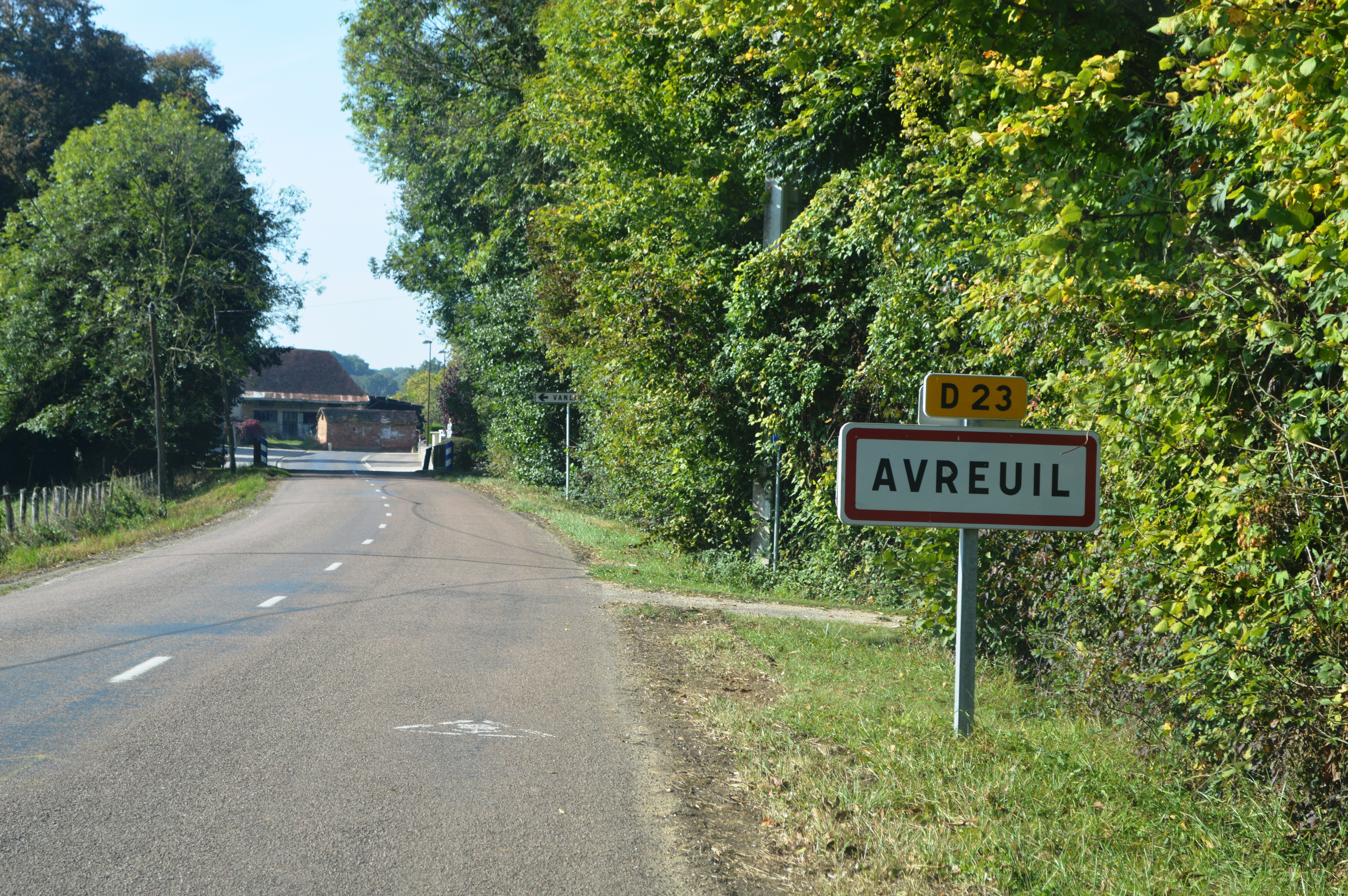
- The road into Avreuil
- Location of Avreuil
- Location within France Location within Grand Est
- Coordinates: 48°02′46″N 3°59′57″E
- Country: France
- Region: Grand Est
- Department: Aube
- Arrondissement: Troyes
- Canton: Les Riceys
- Intercommunality: CC Chaourçois Val Armance

Government
  - Mayor (2020–2026): François Delcher
- Area^{1}: 10.33 km^{2} (3.99 sq mi)
- Elevation: 129 m (423 ft)
- Population (2023): 167
  - Density: 16.2/km^{2} (41.9/sq mi)
- Time zone: UTC+01:00 (CET)
  - Summer (DST): UTC+02:00 (CEST)
- INSEE/Postal code: 10024 /10130
- ^{1} French Land Register data, which excludes lakes, ponds, glaciers > 1 km^{2} (0.386 sq mi or 247 acres) and river estuaries.

Avreuil (French pronunciation: [avʁœj]) is a commune in the Aube department in the Grand Est region of north-central France.

== Geography ==
Avreuil is located some 30 km south by south-west of Troyes and 10 km west of Chaource. Access to the commune is by road D23 from Chamoy in the north which passes through the heart of the commune and the village and continues south to Bernon. The D58 road passes through the north of the commune connecting roads D122 and D27. The D171 goes west from the village to Davrey. Apart from the village there are the hamlets of Les Basses-Voies, Les Teignes, and Les Bordes. There is a large forest in the south (the Bois de Ruelles) and a forest called Les Saulons in the north with the rest of the commune farmland.

The Armance river flows through the north of the commune from east to west where it continues to join the Armançon at Saint-Florentin. The Landion flows through the centre of the commune and the village from east to west and joins the Armance just west of the commune. The Tremagne forms the north-eastern border of the commune as it flows south to join the Armance on the eastern border.

== Administration ==
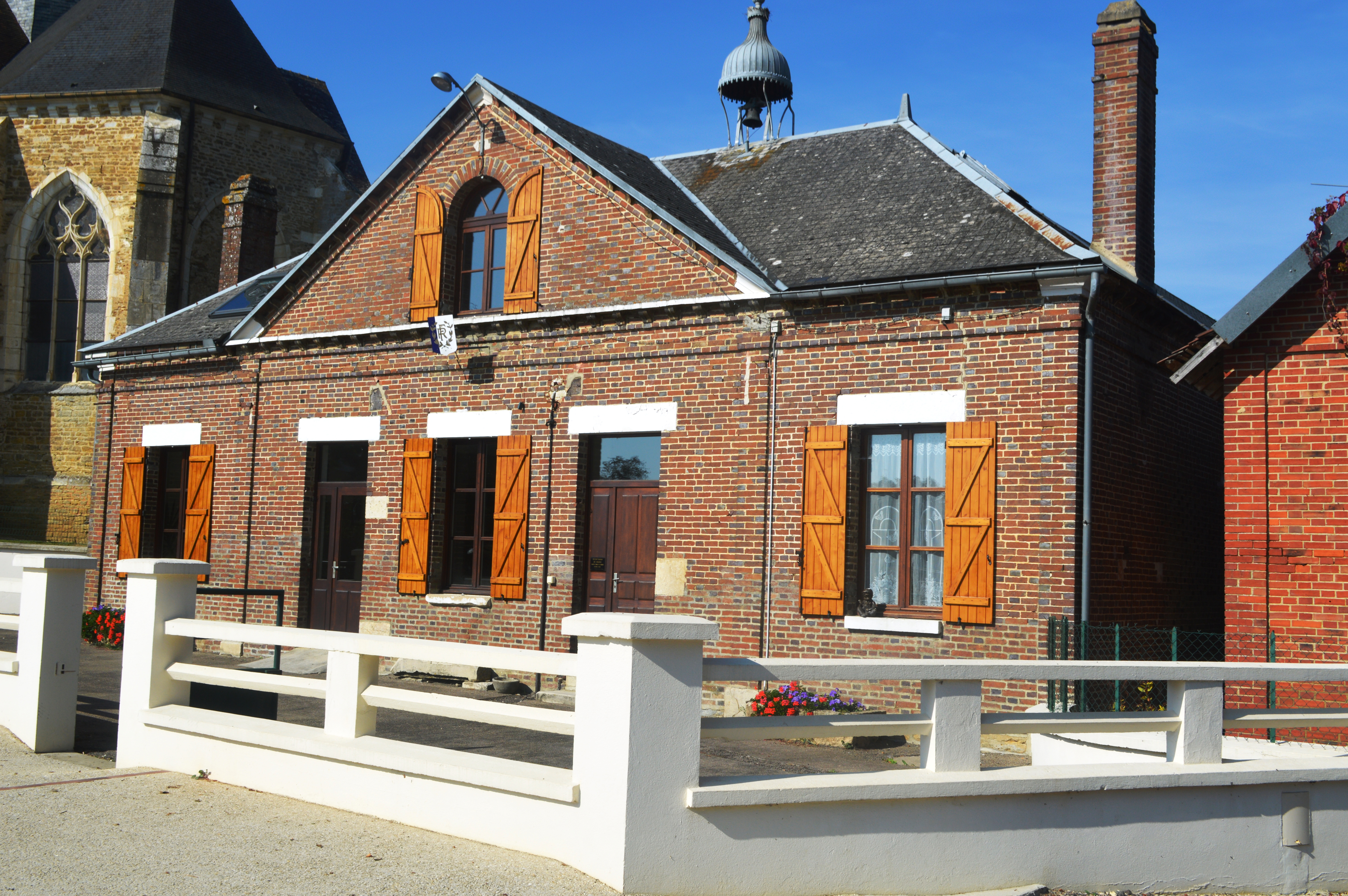
The Town Hall

List of Successive Mayors

From	To	Name
	1857	Berton
1989	2008	François Delcher
2008	2014	Robert Gautherot
2014	2026	François Delcher

== Demography ==
Historical population

Year	Pop.	±% p.a.
1793	362	—
1821	392	+0.28%
1846	405	+0.13%
1872	379	−0.25%
1901	337	−0.40%
1926	244	−1.28%
1946	206	−0.84%
1962	163	−1.45%
1968	185	+2.13%

Year	Pop.	±% p.a.
1975	194	+0.68%
1982	184	−0.75%
1990	168	−1.13%
1999	167	−0.07%
2007	170	+0.22%
2012	147	−2.87%
2017	165	+2.34%
2023	167	+0.20%

Source: EHESS and INSEE

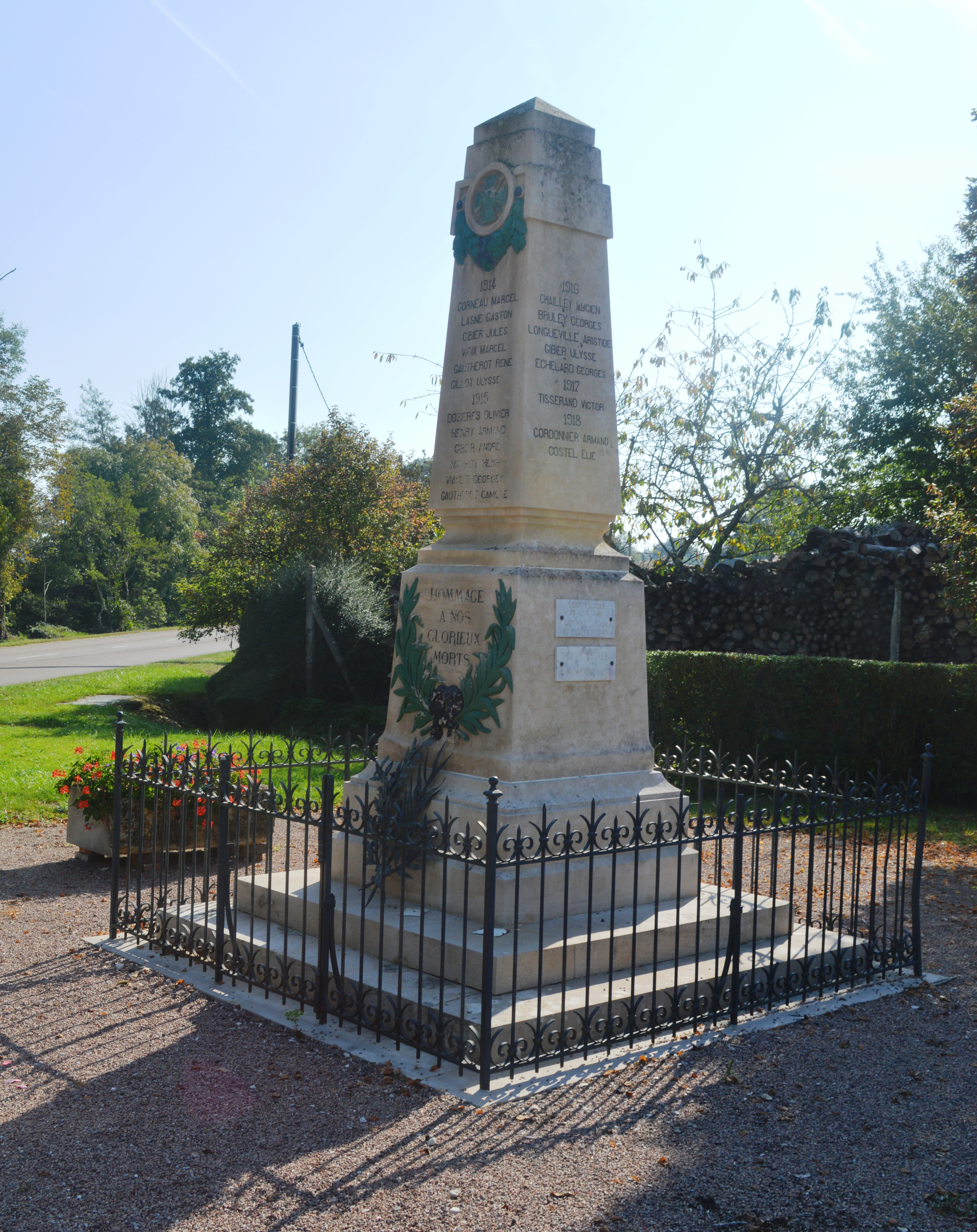
Avreuil War Memorial

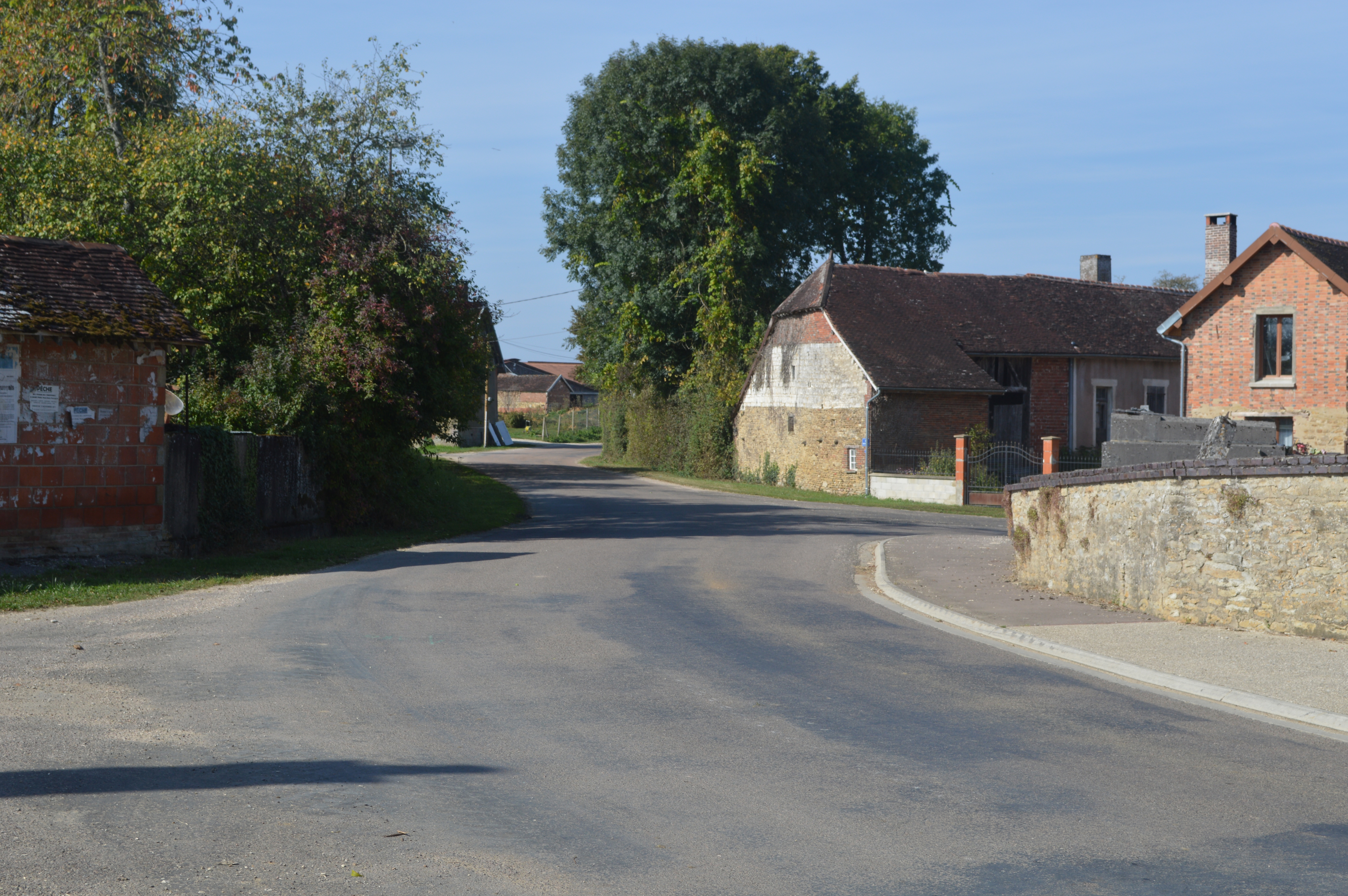
A street in Avreuil

== Culture and heritage ==
=== Civil Heritage ===
The Town Hall contains two items that are registered as historical objects:

- A Liturgical Book: Psalter (1723)
- A Liturgical Book: Antiphonary (17th century)

=== Religious heritage ===
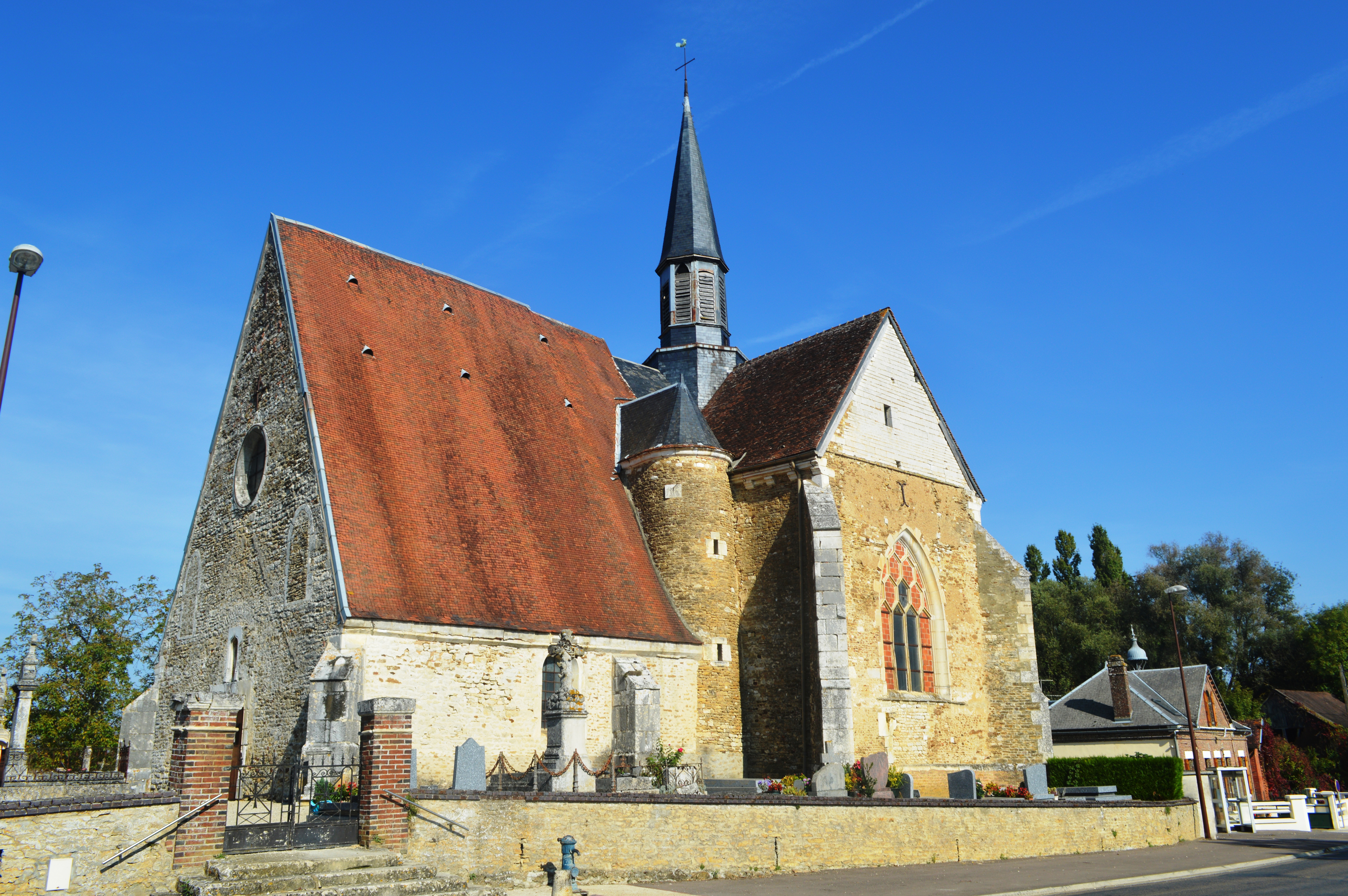
The Church of Notre-Dame of the Assumption

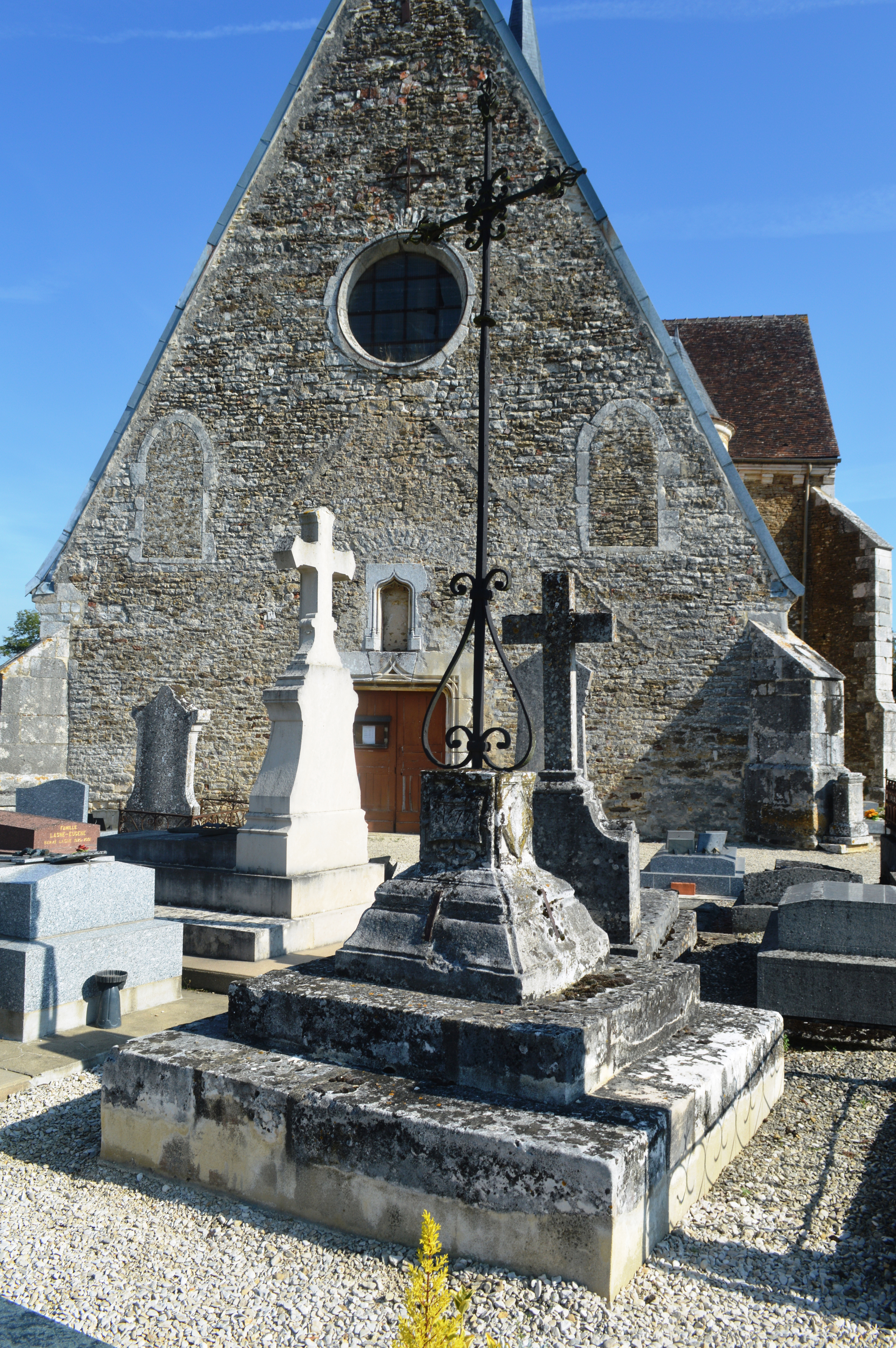
The Cemetery Cross

The Church of Notre-Dame of the Assumption (16th century) is registered as an historical monument. The Church contains many items that are registered as historical objects:

- A Painting: Assumption (18th century)
- A Chair (19th century)
- A Baptismal font (16th century)
- 30 banks of pews (18th century)
- A Pulpit (1745)
- Stalls (18th century)
- An Altar of the Virgin (18th century)
- An Altar Painting: Saint Roch (18th century)
- 2 Chairs (19th century)
- A Statue: Saint Roch (16th century)
- An Altar and Retable in the Chapel (16th century)
- A Statue: Saint Antoine (16th century)
- A Statue: Christ of Pity (16th century)
- A Statue: Saint Paul (16th century)
- Windows (16th century)
- A Statue: Christ Resuscitated (16th century)
- A Statue: Saint Mammès (16th century)
- The main Altar (16th century)
- A Statue: Virgin and Child (16th century)
- A Statue: Nicolas de Cléry (16th century)
- A Statue: Virgin and Child (16th century)
- A Retable: Scenes of the life of the Virgin (1560)
- A Cemetery Cross (1577)
- A Relief: Kiss of Peace (19th century)
- A Chasuble (19th century)
- A Statue fragment: Saint Pierre
- A Tabernacle (18th century)
- A Tombstone (1746)
- A Stained glass window (16th century)

== See also ==
- Communes of the Aube department
