= Chessy =

Chessy is the name or part of the name of three communes of France:

- Chessy, Rhône in the Rhône département
- Chessy, Seine-et-Marne in the Seine-et-Marne département, location of Disneyland Paris
- Chessy-les-Prés in the Aube Département
