= Nogent-en-Othe =

Commune in Grand Est, France

- Commune
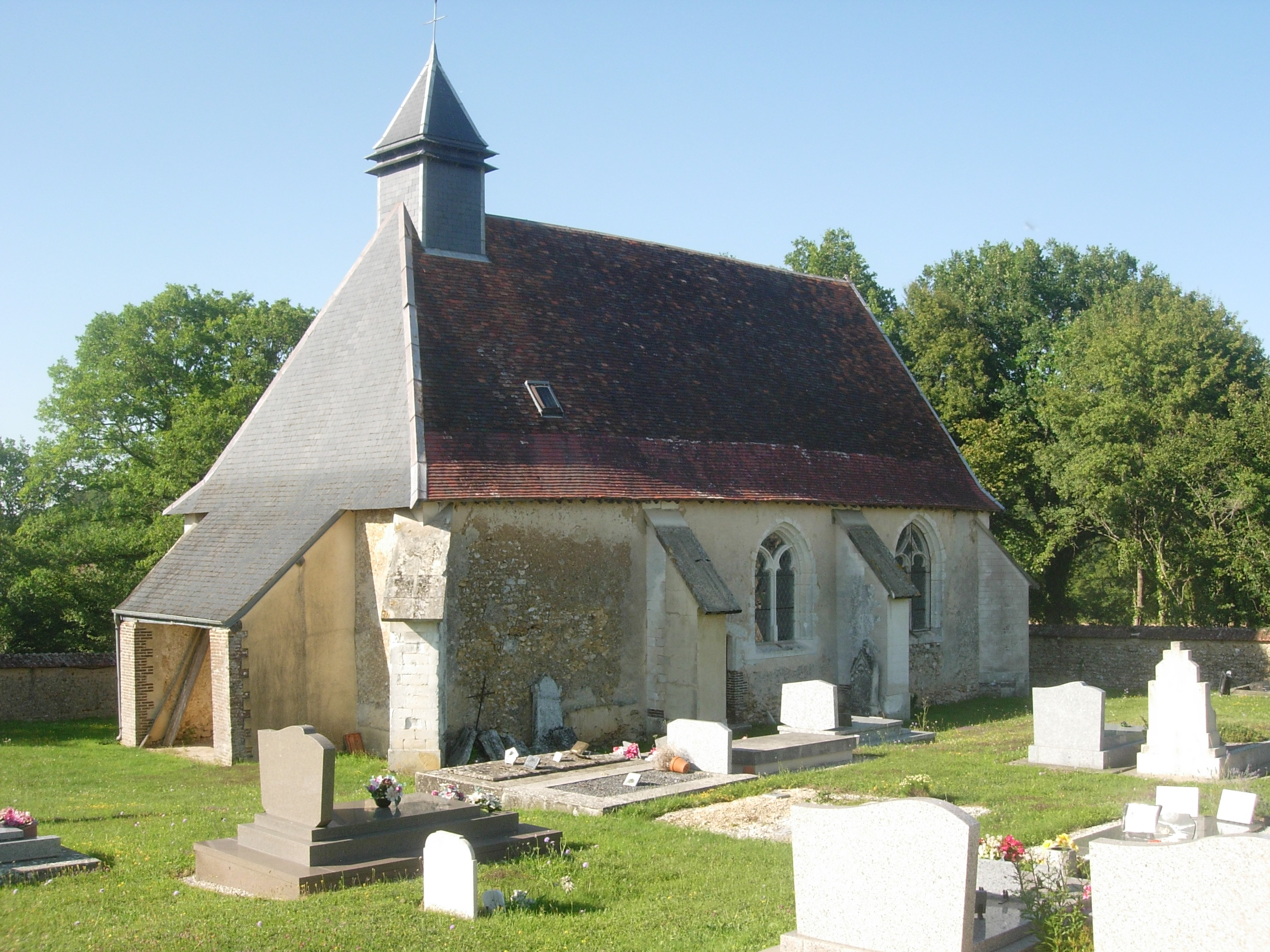
- The church in Nogent-en-Othe
- Location of Nogent-en-Othe
- Location within France Location within Grand Est
- Coordinates: 48°08′45″N 3°48′25″E
- Country: France
- Region: Grand Est
- Department: Aube
- Arrondissement: Troyes
- Canton: Aix-Villemaur-Pâlis
- Intercommunality: Pays d'Othe

Government
  - Mayor (2024–2026): Olivier Roger
- Area^{1}: 9.06 km^{2} (3.50 sq mi)
- Elevation: 198 m (650 ft)
- Population (2023): 42
  - Density: 4.6/km^{2} (12/sq mi)
- Time zone: UTC+01:00 (CET)
  - Summer (DST): UTC+02:00 (CEST)
- INSEE/Postal code: 10266 /10160
- ^{1} French Land Register data, which excludes lakes, ponds, glaciers > 1 km^{2} (0.386 sq mi or 247 acres) and river estuaries.

Nogent-en-Othe (French pronunciation: [nɔʒɑ̃ ɑ̃.n‿ɔt], lit. 'Nogent in Othe') is a commune in the Aube department in north-central France.

== Population ==
Historical population
Year	Pop.	±% p.a.
1968	59	—
1975	44	−4.10%
1982	39	−1.71%
1990	34	−1.70%
1999	38	+1.24%
2007	36	−0.67%
2012	40	+2.13%
2017	46	+2.83%
2023	42	−1.50%
Source: INSEE

== See also ==
- Communes of the Aube department
