= Montfey =

Commune in Grand Est, France

- Commune
- Location of Montfey
- Location within France Location within Grand Est
- Coordinates: 48°04′03″N 3°52′33″E
- Country: France
- Region: Grand Est
- Department: Aube
- Arrondissement: Troyes
- Canton: Aix-Villemaur-Pâlis

Government
  - Mayor (2020–2026): Jérôme Coquille
- Area^{1}: 11.49 km^{2} (4.44 sq mi)
- Elevation: 196 m (643 ft)
- Population (2023): 115
  - Density: 10.0/km^{2} (25.9/sq mi)
- Time zone: UTC+01:00 (CET)
  - Summer (DST): UTC+02:00 (CEST)
- INSEE/Postal code: 10247 /10130
- ^{1} French Land Register data, which excludes lakes, ponds, glaciers > 1 km^{2} (0.386 sq mi or 247 acres) and river estuaries.

Montfey (French pronunciation: [mɔ̃fɛ]) is a commune in the Aube department in north-central France.

== Population ==
Historical population
Year	Pop.	±% p.a.
1968	161	—
1975	127	−3.33%
1982	114	−1.53%
1990	133	+1.95%
1999	134	+0.08%
2007	134	+0.00%
2012	138	+0.59%
2017	134	−0.59%
2023	115	−2.52%
Source: INSEE

== See also ==
- Communes of the Aube department
