= Maraye-en-Othe =

Commune in Grand Est, France

- Commune
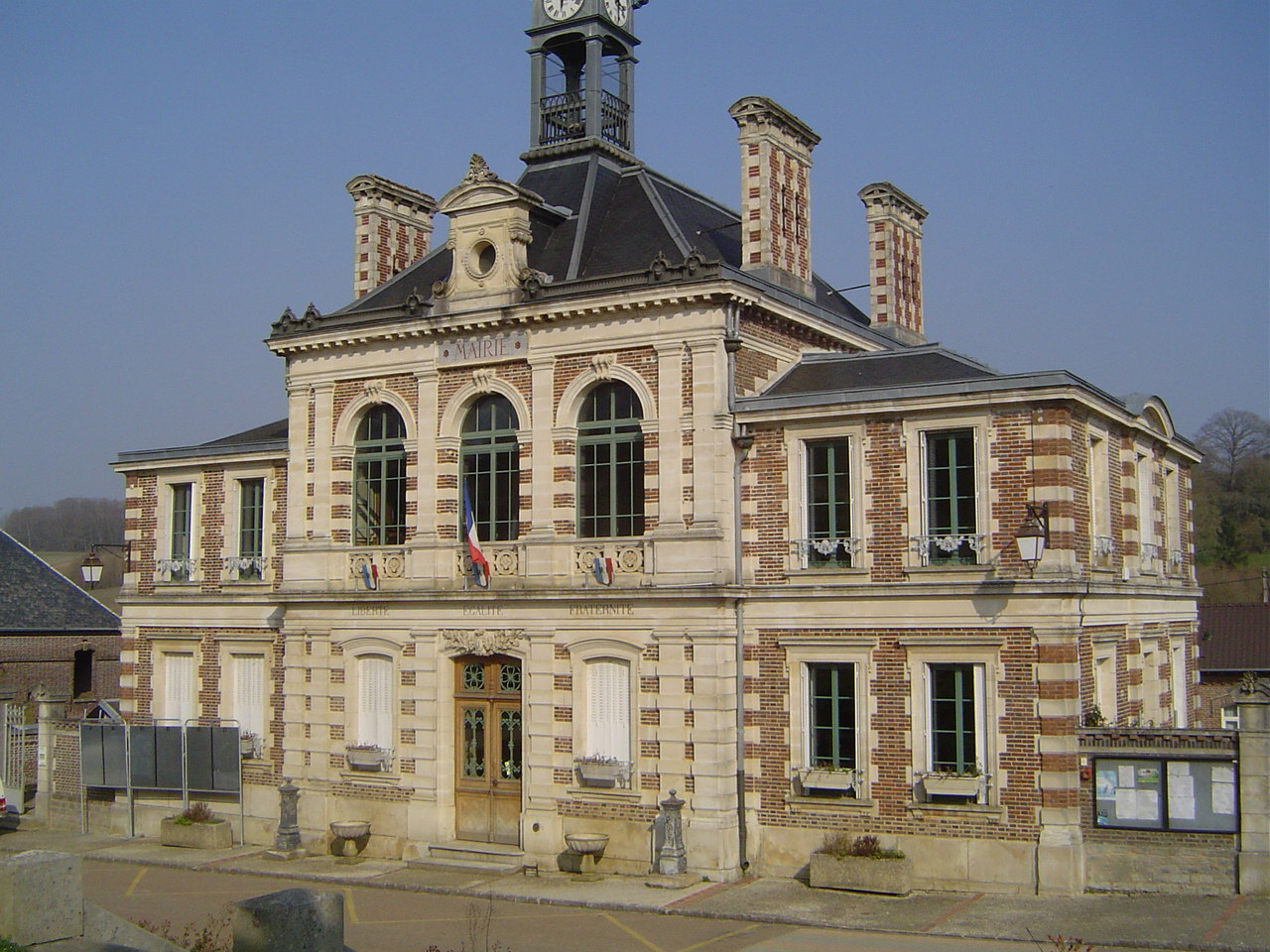
- The town hall in Maraye-en-Othe

- Coat of arms
- Location of Maraye-en-Othe
- Location within France Location within Grand Est
- Coordinates: 48°09′53″N 3°51′12″E
- Country: France
- Region: Grand Est
- Department: Aube
- Arrondissement: Troyes
- Canton: Aix-Villemaur-Pâlis

Government
  - Mayor (2020–2026): Nadège Dudas-Masson
- Area^{1}: 42.32 km^{2} (16.34 sq mi)
- Elevation: 220 m (720 ft)
- Population (2023): 423
  - Density: 10.0/km^{2} (25.9/sq mi)
- Time zone: UTC+01:00 (CET)
  - Summer (DST): UTC+02:00 (CEST)
- INSEE/Postal code: 10222 /10160
- ^{1} French Land Register data, which excludes lakes, ponds, glaciers > 1 km^{2} (0.386 sq mi or 247 acres) and river estuaries.

Maraye-en-Othe (French pronunciation: [maʁɛ ɑ̃.n‿ɔt], lit. 'Maraye in Othe') is a commune in the Aube department in north-central France.

== Population ==
Historical population
Year	Pop.	±% p.a.
1968	429	—
1975	362	−2.40%
1982	374	+0.47%
1990	428	+1.70%
1999	432	+0.10%
2007	504	+1.95%
2012	500	−0.16%
2017	446	−2.26%
2023	423	−0.88%
Source: INSEE

== See also ==
- Communes of the Aube department
