= Rigny-le-Ferron =

Commune in Grand Est, France

- Commune
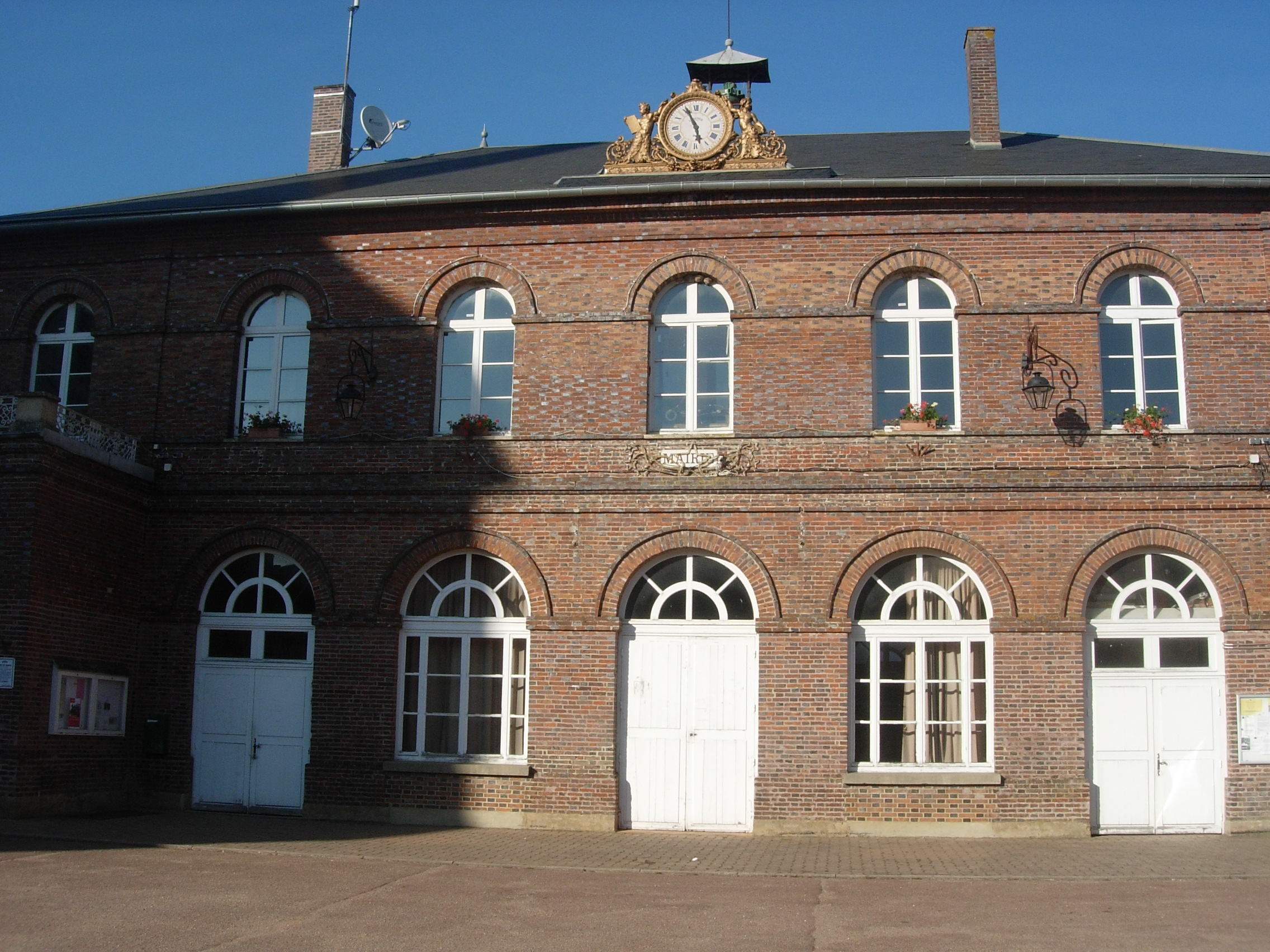
- The town hall in Rigny-le-Ferron
- Location of Rigny-le-Ferron
- Location within France Location within Grand Est
- Coordinates: 48°12′33″N 3°37′57″E
- Country: France
- Region: Grand Est
- Department: Aube
- Arrondissement: Troyes
- Canton: Aix-Villemaur-Pâlis
- Intercommunality: Pays d'Othe

Government
  - Mayor (2020–2026): Jannick Deraeve
- Area^{1}: 19.05 km^{2} (7.36 sq mi)
- Elevation: 145 m (476 ft)
- Population (2023): 323
  - Density: 17.0/km^{2} (43.9/sq mi)
- Time zone: UTC+01:00 (CET)
  - Summer (DST): UTC+02:00 (CEST)
- INSEE/Postal code: 10319 /10160
- ^{1} French Land Register data, which excludes lakes, ponds, glaciers > 1 km^{2} (0.386 sq mi or 247 acres) and river estuaries.

Rigny-le-Ferron (French pronunciation: [ʁiɲi lə fɛʁɔ̃]) is a commune in the Aube department in north-central France.

== Population ==
Historical population
Year	Pop.	±% p.a.
1968	501	—
1975	379	−3.91%
1982	347	−1.25%
1990	296	−1.97%
1999	337	+1.45%
2007	369	+1.14%
2012	366	−0.16%
2017	352	−0.78%
2023	323	−1.42%
Source: INSEE

== See also ==
- Communes of the Aube department
