= Les Croûtes =

Commune in Grand Est, France

- Commune
- Location of Les Croûtes
- Location within France Location within Grand Est
- Coordinates: 47°59′53″N 3°51′54″E
- Country: France
- Region: Grand Est
- Department: Aube
- Arrondissement: Troyes
- Canton: Aix-Villemaur-Pâlis
- Intercommunality: CC du Chaourçois et du Val d'Armance

Government
  - Mayor (2024–2026): Michel Hanhart
- Area^{1}: 7.11 km^{2} (2.75 sq mi)
- Elevation: 137 m (449 ft)
- Population (2023): 99
  - Density: 14/km^{2} (36/sq mi)
- Time zone: UTC+01:00 (CET)
  - Summer (DST): UTC+02:00 (CEST)
- INSEE/Postal code: 10118 /10130
- ^{1} French Land Register data, which excludes lakes, ponds, glaciers > 1 km^{2} (0.386 sq mi or 247 acres) and river estuaries.

Les Croûtes (French pronunciation: [le kʁut]) is a commune in the Aube department in north-central France.

== Population ==
Historical population
Year	Pop.	±% p.a.
1968	134	—
1975	138	+0.42%
1982	114	−2.69%
1990	114	+0.00%
1999	113	−0.10%
2007	104	−1.03%
2012	105	+0.19%
2017	97	−1.57%
2023	99	+0.34%
Source: INSEE

== See also ==
- Communes of the Aube department
