= Prugny =

Commune in Grand Est, France

- Commune
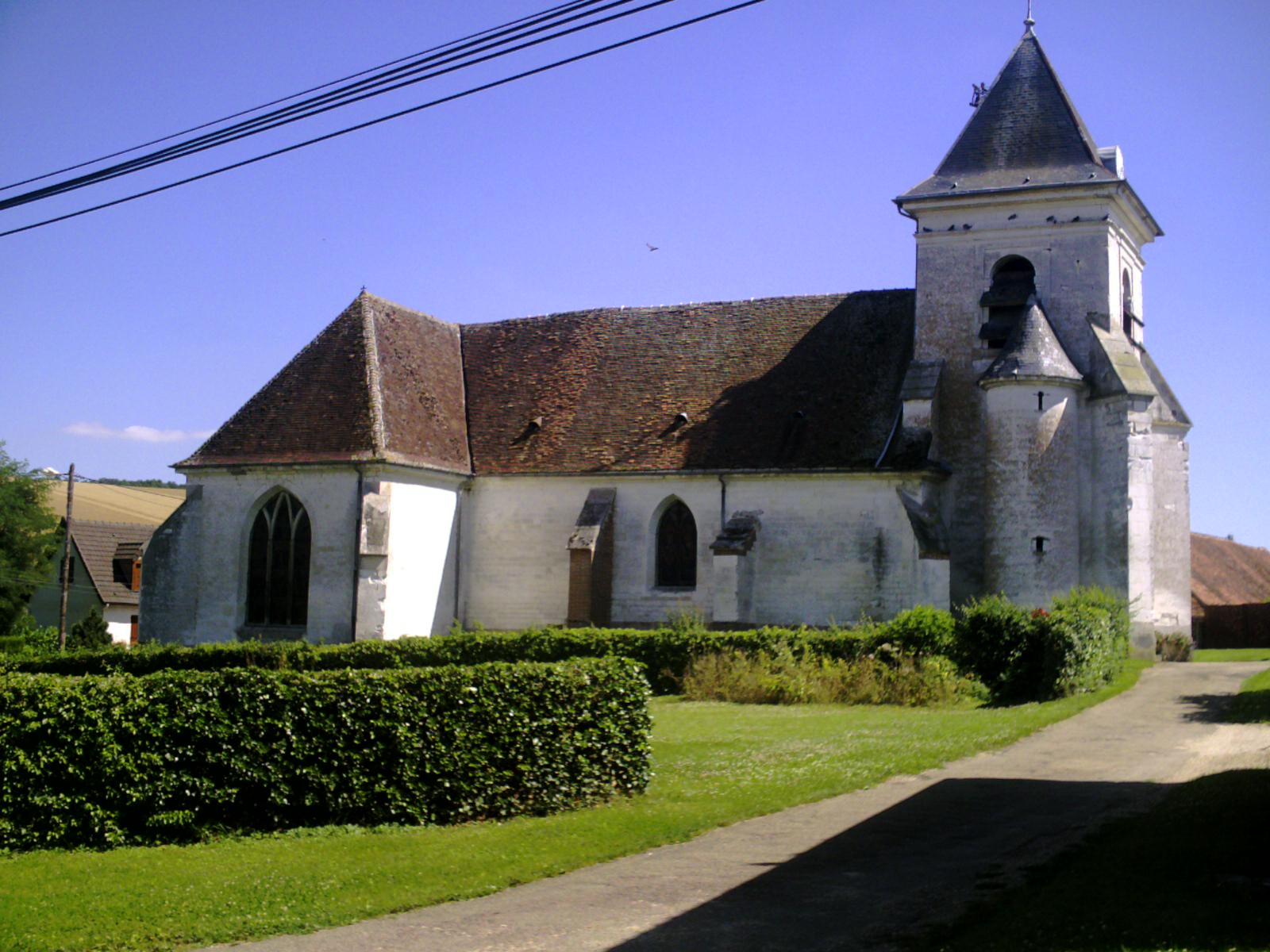
- The church in Prugny

- Coat of arms
- Location of Prugny
- Location within France Location within Grand Est
- Coordinates: 48°14′49″N 3°56′42″E
- Country: France
- Region: Grand Est
- Department: Aube
- Arrondissement: Troyes
- Canton: Aix-Villemaur-Pâlis
- Intercommunality: CA Troyes Champagne Métropole

Government
  - Mayor (2020–2026): Emmanuel Choiselat
- Area^{1}: 8.62 km^{2} (3.33 sq mi)
- Elevation: 190 m (620 ft)
- Highest elevation: 260 m (850 ft)
- Lowest elevation: 172 m (564 ft)
- Population (2023): 367
  - Density: 42.6/km^{2} (110/sq mi)
- Time zone: UTC+01:00 (CET)
  - Summer (DST): UTC+02:00 (CEST)
- INSEE/Postal code: 10307 /10190
- ^{1} French Land Register data, which excludes lakes, ponds, glaciers > 1 km^{2} (0.386 sq mi or 247 acres) and river estuaries.

Prugny (French pronunciation: [pʁyɲi]) is a commune in the Aube department in north-central France.

== Population ==
Historical population
Year	Pop.	±% p.a.
1968	92	—
1975	145	+6.72%
1982	259	+8.64%
1990	300	+1.85%
1999	316	+0.58%
2007	395	+2.83%
2012	384	−0.56%
2017	375	−0.47%
2023	367	−0.36%
Source: INSEE

== See also ==
- Communes of the Aube department
