= Villemoiron-en-Othe =

Commune in Grand Est, France

- Commune
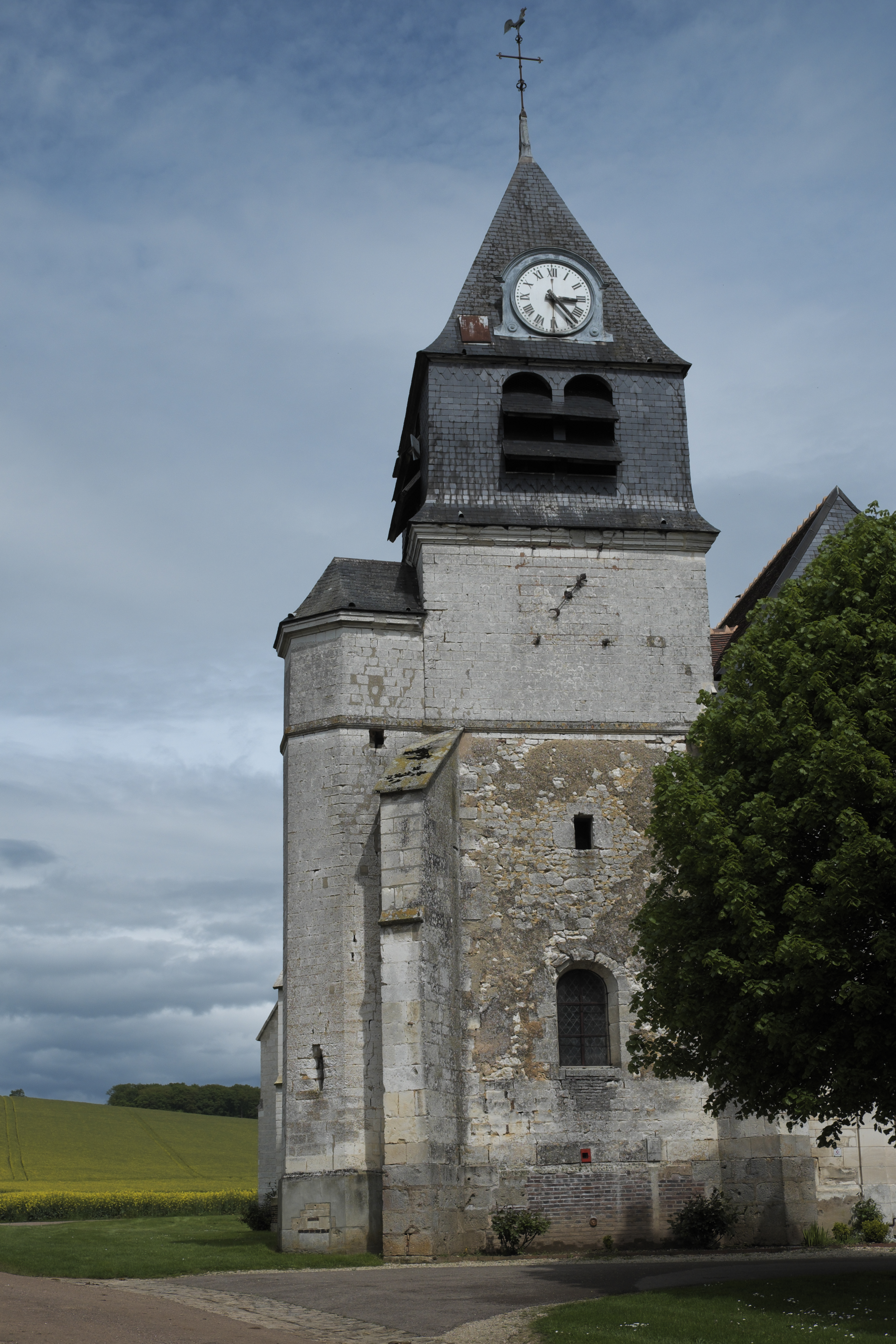
- The church in Villemoiron-en-Othe
- Location of Villemoiron-en-Othe
- Location within France Location within Grand Est
- Coordinates: 48°12′03″N 3°46′46″E
- Country: France
- Region: Grand Est
- Department: Aube
- Arrondissement: Troyes
- Canton: Aix-Villemaur-Pâlis

Government
  - Mayor (2020–2026): Roland Frelin
- Area^{1}: 12.49 km^{2} (4.82 sq mi)
- Elevation: 159 m (522 ft)
- Population (2023): 201
  - Density: 16.1/km^{2} (41.7/sq mi)
- Time zone: UTC+01:00 (CET)
  - Summer (DST): UTC+02:00 (CEST)
- INSEE/Postal code: 10417 /10160
- ^{1} French Land Register data, which excludes lakes, ponds, glaciers > 1 km^{2} (0.386 sq mi or 247 acres) and river estuaries.

Villemoiron-en-Othe (French pronunciation: [vilmwaʁɔ̃ ɑ̃.n‿ɔt], lit. 'Villemoiron in Othe') is a commune in the Aube department in north-central France.

== Population ==
Historical population
Year	Pop.	±% p.a.
1968	180	—
1975	149	−2.66%
1982	135	−1.40%
1990	178	+3.52%
1999	207	+1.69%
2007	220	+0.76%
2012	223	+0.27%
2017	198	−2.35%
2023	201	+0.25%
Source: INSEE

== See also ==
- Communes of the Aube department
