= Montigny-les-Monts =

Commune in Grand Est, France

- Commune
- Location of Montigny-les-Monts
- Location within France Location within Grand Est
- Coordinates: 48°06′15″N 3°56′51″E
- Country: France
- Region: Grand Est
- Department: Aube
- Arrondissement: Troyes
- Canton: Aix-Villemaur-Pâlis

Government
  - Mayor (2020–2026): Xavier Jay
- Area^{1}: 14.63 km^{2} (5.65 sq mi)
- Population (2023): 247
  - Density: 16.9/km^{2} (43.7/sq mi)
- Time zone: UTC+01:00 (CET)
  - Summer (DST): UTC+02:00 (CEST)
- INSEE/Postal code: 10251 /10130
- ^{1} French Land Register data, which excludes lakes, ponds, glaciers > 1 km^{2} (0.386 sq mi or 247 acres) and river estuaries.

Montigny-les-Monts (French pronunciation: [mɔ̃tiɲi le mɔ̃]) is a commune in the Aube department in north-central France.

== Population ==
Historical population
| Year | Pop. | ±% p.a. |
|---|---|---|
| 1968 | 213 | — |
| 1975 | 184 | −2.07% |
| 1982 | 197 | +0.98% |
| 1990 | 214 | +1.04% |
| 1999 | 193 | −1.14% |
| 2007 | 267 | +4.14% |
| 2012 | 260 | −0.53% |
| 2017 | 250 | −0.78% |
| 2023 | 247 | −0.20% |
Source: INSEE

== See also ==
- Communes of the Aube department
