= Villeneuve-au-Chemin =

Commune in Grand Est, France

- Commune
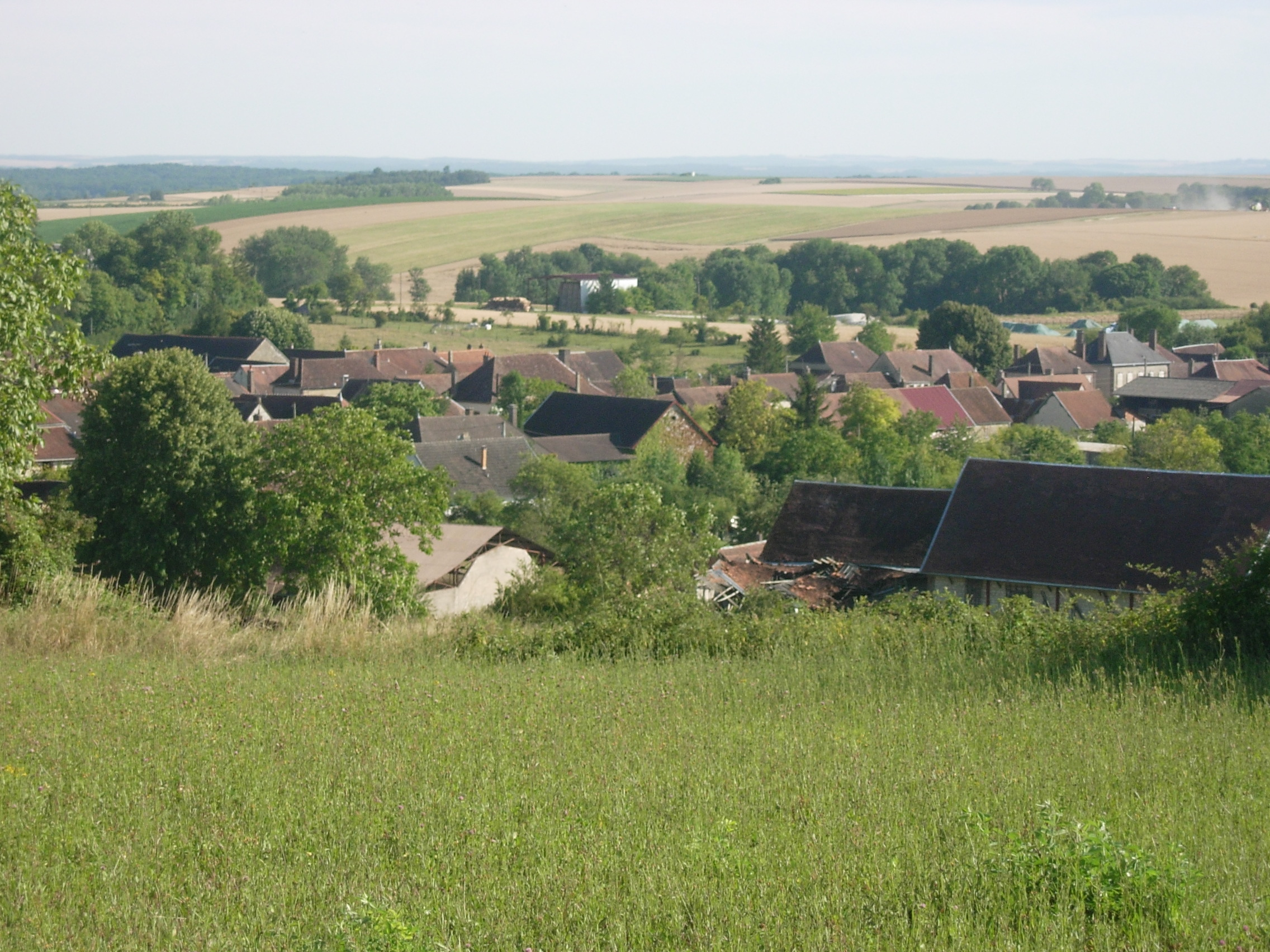
- A general view of Villeneuve-au-Chemin
- Location of Villeneuve-au-Chemin
- Location within France Location within Grand Est
- Coordinates: 48°05′25″N 3°51′03″E
- Country: France
- Region: Grand Est
- Department: Aube
- Arrondissement: Troyes
- Canton: Aix-Villemaur-Pâlis

Government
  - Mayor (2020–2026): Gilles de Cockborne
- Area^{1}: 3.35 km^{2} (1.29 sq mi)
- Population (2023): 189
  - Density: 56.4/km^{2} (146/sq mi)
- Time zone: UTC+01:00 (CET)
  - Summer (DST): UTC+02:00 (CEST)
- INSEE/Postal code: 10422 /10130
- ^{1} French Land Register data, which excludes lakes, ponds, glaciers > 1 km^{2} (0.386 sq mi or 247 acres) and river estuaries.

Villeneuve-au-Chemin (French pronunciation: [vilnœv o ʃəmɛ̃]) is a commune in the Aube department in north-central France.

Its principal centres of interest reside in its church and the vault Saint Joseph, formerly places of pilgrimage.

== Population ==
Historical population
Year	Pop.	±% p.a.
1968	238	—
1975	218	−1.25%
1982	186	−2.24%
1990	167	−1.34%
1999	176	+0.58%
2007	193	+1.16%
2012	183	−1.06%
2017	185	+0.22%
2023	189	+0.36%
Source: INSEE

== See also ==
- Communes of the Aube department
