= Canton of Aix-Villemaur-Pâlis =

Coordinates: 48.22°N 3.73°E

- Canton
- Situation of the canton of Aix-Villemaur-Pâlis in the department of Aube
- Country: France
- Region: Grand Est
- Department: Aube
- No. of communes: {{{nbcomm}}}
- Population (2023): 17,323
- INSEE code: 1001

The canton of Aix-Villemaur-Pâlis (before 2021: Aix-en-Othe) is an administrative division of the Aube department, northeastern France. Its borders were modified at the French canton reorganisation which came into effect in March 2015. Its seat is in Aix-Villemaur-Palis.

It consists of the following communes:

1. Aix-Villemaur-Palis
2. Auxon
3. Bercenay-en-Othe
4. Bérulle
5. Bucey-en-Othe
6. Chamoy
7. Chennegy
8. Chessy-les-Prés
9. Coursan-en-Othe
10. Courtaoult
11. Les Croûtes
12. Davrey
13. Eaux-Puiseaux
14. Ervy-le-Châtel
15. Estissac
16. Fontvannes
17. Maraye-en-Othe
18. Marolles-sous-Lignières
19. Messon
20. Montfey
21. Montigny-les-Monts
22. Neuville-sur-Vanne
23. Nogent-en-Othe
24. Paisy-Cosdon
25. Planty
26. Prugny
27. Racines
28. Rigny-le-Ferron
29. Saint-Benoist-sur-Vanne
30. Saint-Mards-en-Othe
31. Saint-Phal
32. Vauchassis
33. Villemoiron-en-Othe
34. Villeneuve-au-Chemin
35. Vosnon
36. Vulaines
