= Chennegy =

Commune in Grand Est, France

- Commune
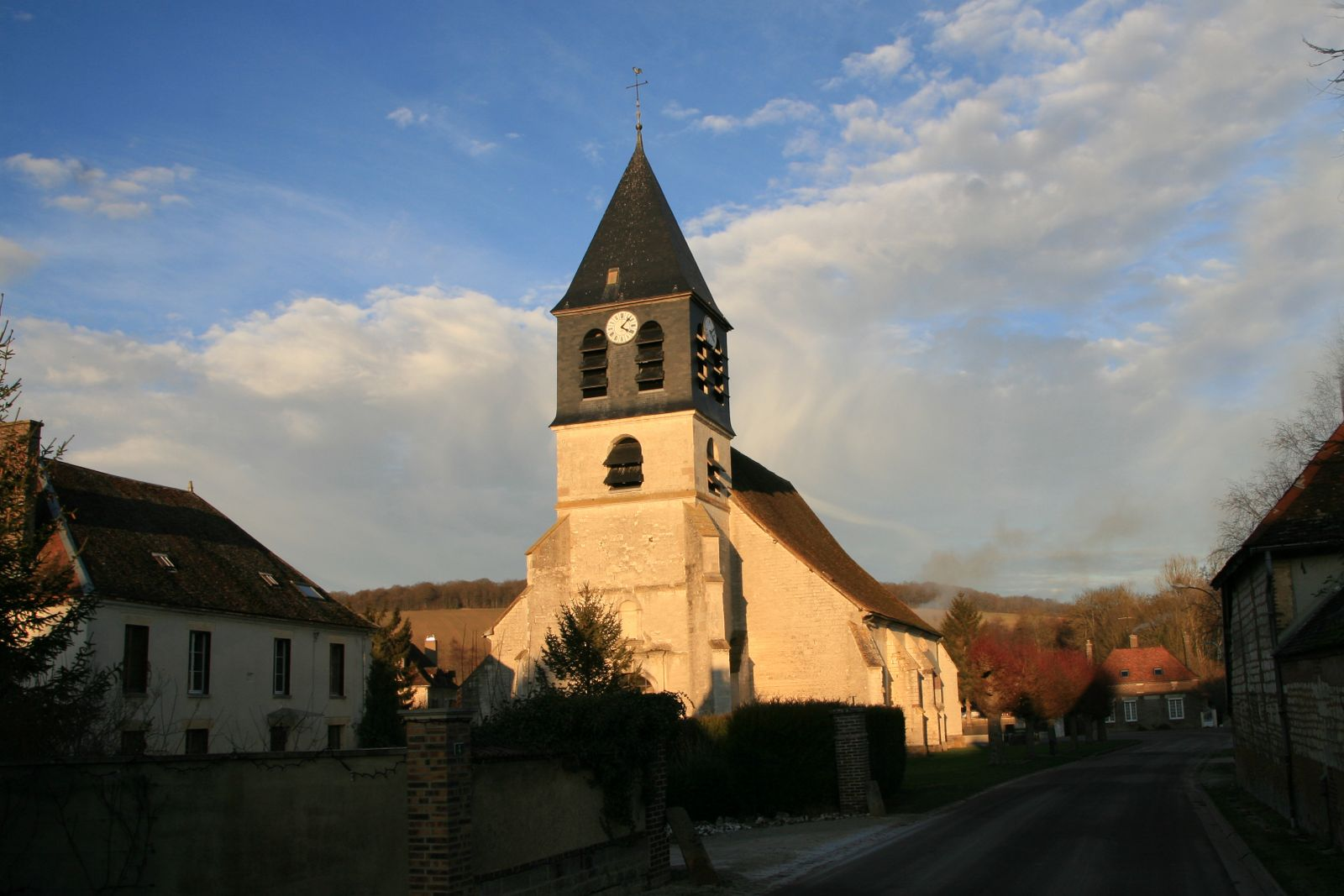
- The church in Chennegy

- Coat of arms
- Location of Chennegy
- Location within France Location within Grand Est
- Coordinates: 48°13′30″N 3°51′16″E
- Country: France
- Region: Grand Est
- Department: Aube
- Arrondissement: Troyes
- Canton: Aix-Villemaur-Pâlis

Government
  - Mayor (2020–2026): Daniel Duchange
- Area^{1}: 23.19 km^{2} (8.95 sq mi)
- Elevation: 154 m (505 ft)
- Highest elevation: 254 m (833 ft)
- Lowest elevation: 146 m (479 ft)
- Population (2023): 472
  - Density: 20.4/km^{2} (52.7/sq mi)
- Time zone: UTC+01:00 (CET)
  - Summer (DST): UTC+02:00 (CEST)
- INSEE/Postal code: 10096 /10190
- ^{1} French Land Register data, which excludes lakes, ponds, glaciers > 1 km^{2} (0.386 sq mi or 247 acres) and river estuaries.

Chennegy (French pronunciation: [ʃɛnʒi]) is a commune in the Aube department in north-central France.

== Population ==
Historical population
Year	Pop.	±% p.a.
1968	352	—
1975	341	−0.45%
1982	368	+1.09%
1990	392	+0.79%
1999	398	+0.17%
2007	465	+1.96%
2012	440	−1.10%
2017	438	−0.09%
2023	472	+1.25%
Source: INSEE

== See also ==
- Communes of the Aube department
