= Bercenay-en-Othe =

Commune in Grand Est, France

- Commune
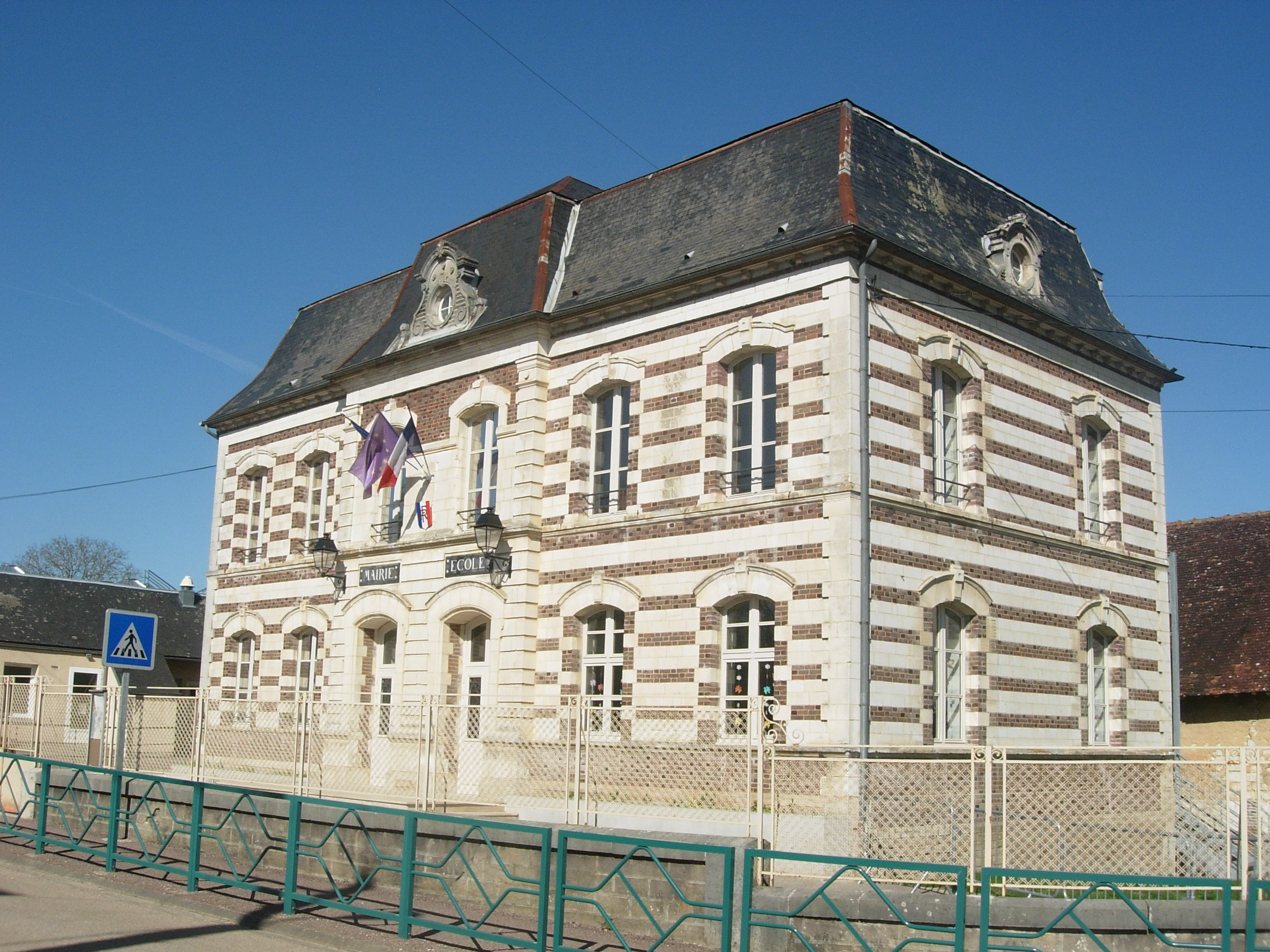
- Town hall
- Location of Bercenay-en-Othe
- Location within France Location within Grand Est
- Coordinates: 48°12′33″N 3°53′40″E
- Country: France
- Region: Grand Est
- Department: Aube
- Arrondissement: Troyes
- Canton: Aix-Villemaur-Pâlis
- Intercommunality: Pays d'Othe

Government
  - Mayor (2020–2026): Jean-Pierre Gitzhoffen
- Area^{1}: 17.85 km^{2} (6.89 sq mi)
- Elevation: 190 m (620 ft)
- Highest elevation: 282 m (925 ft)
- Lowest elevation: 164 m (538 ft)
- Population (2023): 412
  - Density: 23.1/km^{2} (59.8/sq mi)
- Time zone: UTC+01:00 (CET)
  - Summer (DST): UTC+02:00 (CEST)
- INSEE/Postal code: 10037 /10190
- ^{1} French Land Register data, which excludes lakes, ponds, glaciers > 1 km^{2} (0.386 sq mi or 247 acres) and river estuaries.

Bercenay-en-Othe (French pronunciation: [bɛʁsənɛ ɑ̃.n‿ɔt], lit. 'Bercenay in Othe') is a commune in the Aube department in north-central France.

== Population ==
Historical population
Year	Pop.	±% p.a.
1968	232	—
1975	206	−1.68%
1982	329	+6.92%
1990	420	+3.10%
1999	380	−1.11%
2007	366	−0.47%
2012	440	+3.75%
2017	477	+1.63%
2023	412	−2.41%
Source: INSEE

== See also ==
- Communes of the Aube department
