= Eaux-Puiseaux =

Commune in Grand Est, France

- Commune
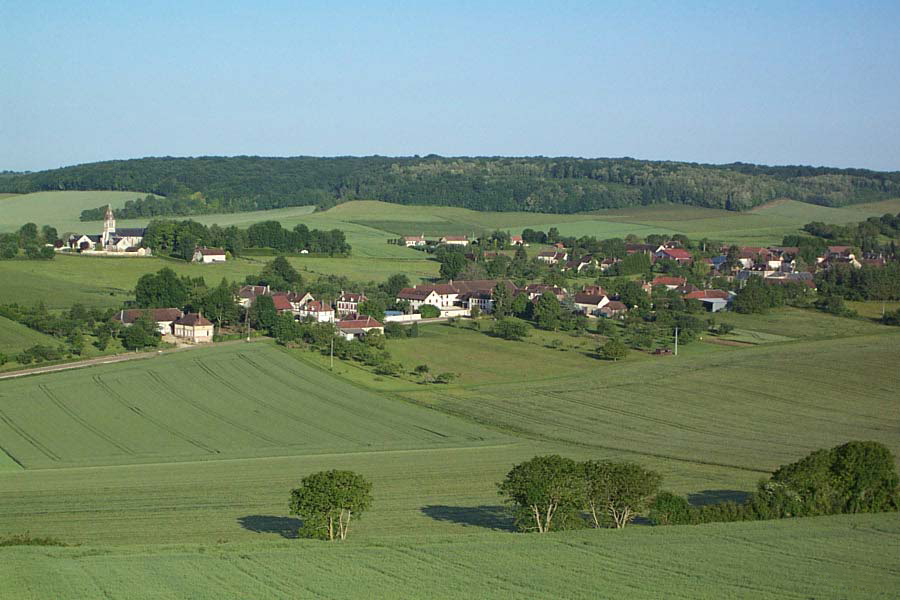
- A general view of Eaux-Puiseaux
- Location of Eaux-Puiseaux
- Location within France Location within Grand Est
- Coordinates: 48°07′15″N 3°53′30″E
- Country: France
- Region: Grand Est
- Department: Aube
- Arrondissement: Troyes
- Canton: Aix-Villemaur-Pâlis
- Intercommunality: Chaourçois et Val d'Armance

Government
  - Mayor (2020–2026): Christophe Louault
- Area^{1}: 8.61 km^{2} (3.32 sq mi)
- Elevation: 220 m (720 ft)
- Highest elevation: 280 m (920 ft)
- Lowest elevation: 157 m (515 ft)
- Population (2023): 248
  - Density: 28.8/km^{2} (74.6/sq mi)
- Time zone: UTC+01:00 (CET)
  - Summer (DST): UTC+02:00 (CEST)
- INSEE/Postal code: 10133 /10130
- ^{1} French Land Register data, which excludes lakes, ponds, glaciers > 1 km^{2} (0.386 sq mi or 247 acres) and river estuaries.

Eaux-Puiseaux (French pronunciation: [o pɥizo]) is a commune in the Aube department in north-central France.

Eaux-Puiseaux is situated about 35 km from Troyes and 50 km from Auxerre, in the canton of Aix-Villemaur-Pâlis. The RN77 road passes close to the village.

== Population ==
Historical population
Year	Pop.	±% p.a.
1968	216	—
1975	186	−2.11%
1982	186	+0.00%
1990	172	−0.97%
1999	194	+1.35%
2007	233	+2.32%
2012	233	+0.00%
2017	255	+1.82%
2023	248	−0.46%
Source: INSEE

== See also ==
- Communes of the Aube department
