= Racines, Aube =

Commune in Grand Est, France

Racines
- Commune
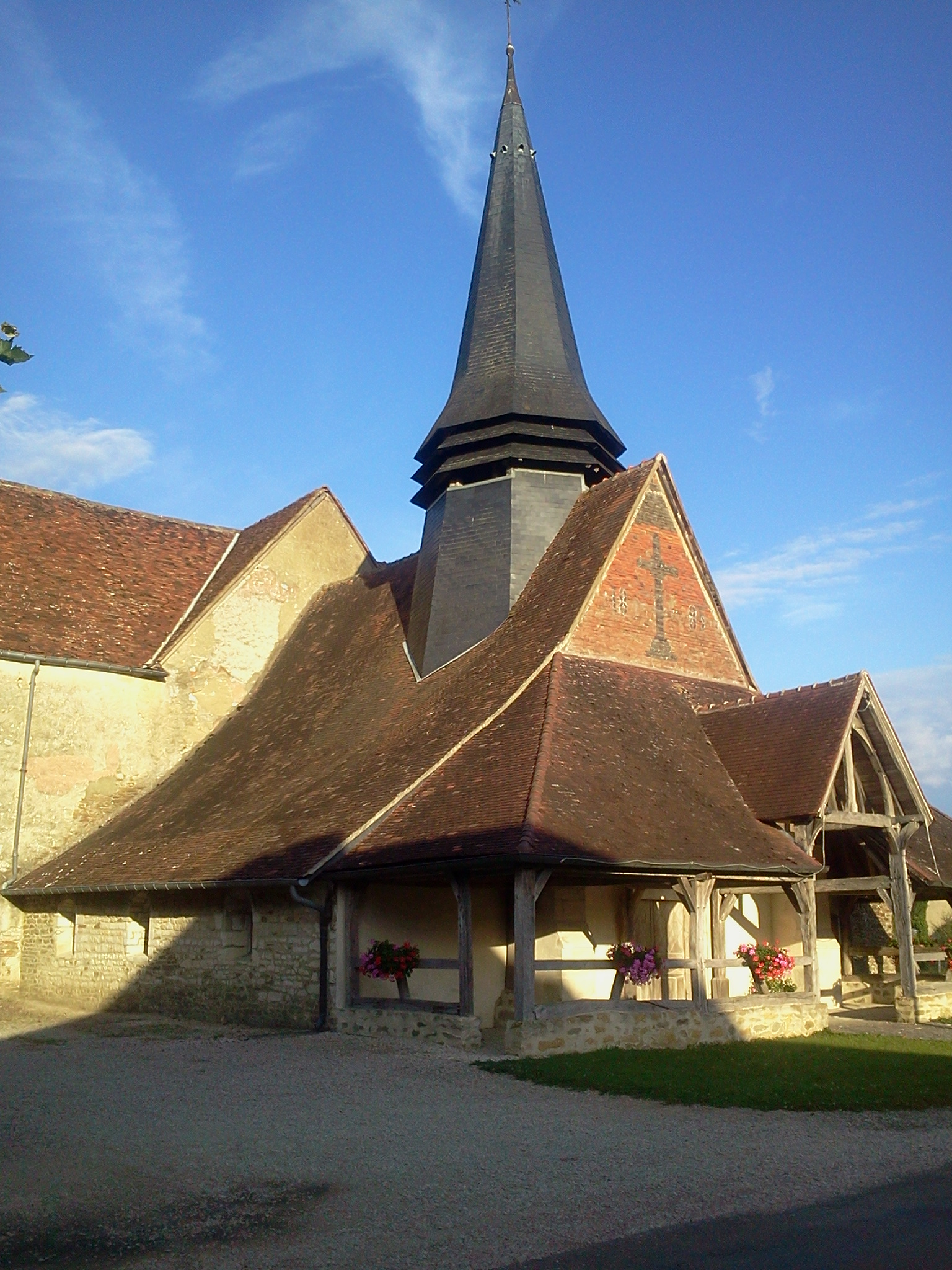
- The church in Racines

- Coat of arms
- Location of Racines
- Location within France Location within Grand Est
- Coordinates: 48°03′02″N 3°50′40″E
- Country: France
- Region: Grand Est
- Department: Aube
- Arrondissement: Troyes
- Canton: Aix-Villemaur-Pâlis
- Intercommunality: Chaourçois et Val d'Armance

Government
  - Mayor (2020–2026): Alain Guillot
- Area^{1}: 7.5 km^{2} (2.9 sq mi)
- Elevation: 131 m (430 ft)
- Population (2023): 179
  - Density: 24/km^{2} (62/sq mi)
- Time zone: UTC+01:00 (CET)
  - Summer (DST): UTC+02:00 (CEST)
- INSEE/Postal code: 10312 /10130
- ^{1} French Land Register data, which excludes lakes, ponds, glaciers > 1 km^{2} (0.386 sq mi or 247 acres) and river estuaries.

Racines (French pronunciation: [ʁasin]) is a commune in the Aube department in north-central France.

== Population ==
Historical population
Year	Pop.	±% p.a.
1968	187	—
1975	201	+1.04%
1982	178	−1.72%
1990	149	−2.20%
1999	179	+2.06%
2007	199	+1.33%
2012	168	−3.33%
2017	167	−0.12%
2023	179	+1.16%
Source: INSEE

== See also ==
- Communes of the Aube department
