= Courtaoult =

Commune in Grand Est, France

- Commune
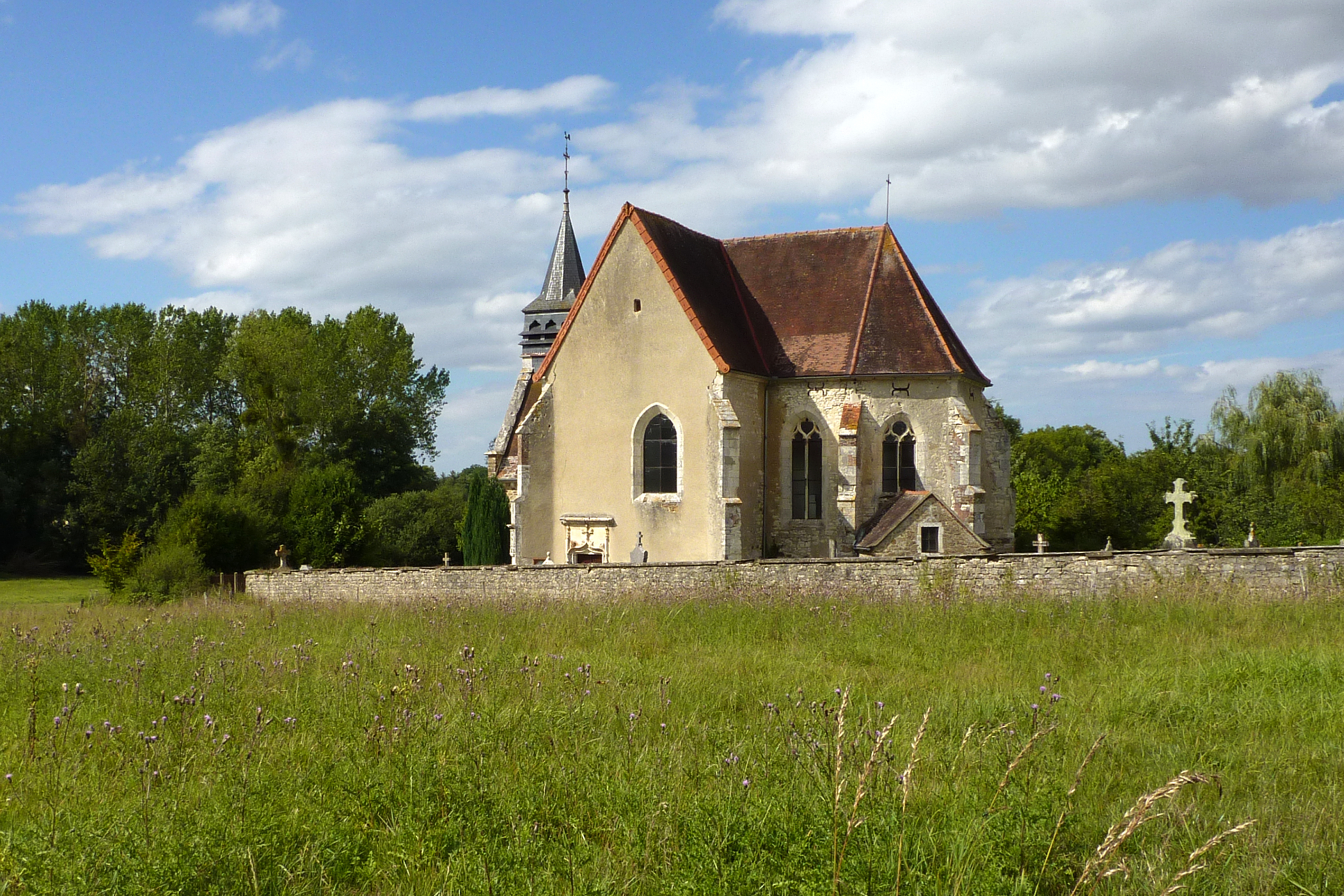
- The church in Courtaoult
- Location of Courtaoult
- Location within France Location within Grand Est
- Coordinates: 48°01′32″N 3°51′49″E
- Country: France
- Region: Grand Est
- Department: Aube
- Arrondissement: Troyes
- Canton: Aix-Villemaur-Pâlis

Government
  - Mayor (2020–2026): Gabriel Michaut
- Area^{1}: 8.36 km^{2} (3.23 sq mi)
- Elevation: 128 m (420 ft)
- Population (2023): 95
  - Density: 11/km^{2} (29/sq mi)
- Time zone: UTC+01:00 (CET)
  - Summer (DST): UTC+02:00 (CEST)
- INSEE/Postal code: 10108 /10130
- ^{1} French Land Register data, which excludes lakes, ponds, glaciers > 1 km^{2} (0.386 sq mi or 247 acres) and river estuaries.

Courtaoult is a commune in the Aube department in north-central France.

== Population ==
Historical population
Year	Pop.	±% p.a.
1968	81	—
1975	93	+1.99%
1982	88	−0.79%
1990	87	−0.14%
1999	75	−1.64%
2007	78	+0.49%
2012	96	+4.24%
2017	83	−2.87%
2023	95	+2.28%
Source: INSEE

== See also ==
- Communes of the Aube department
