= Messon =

Commune in Grand Est, France

- Commune
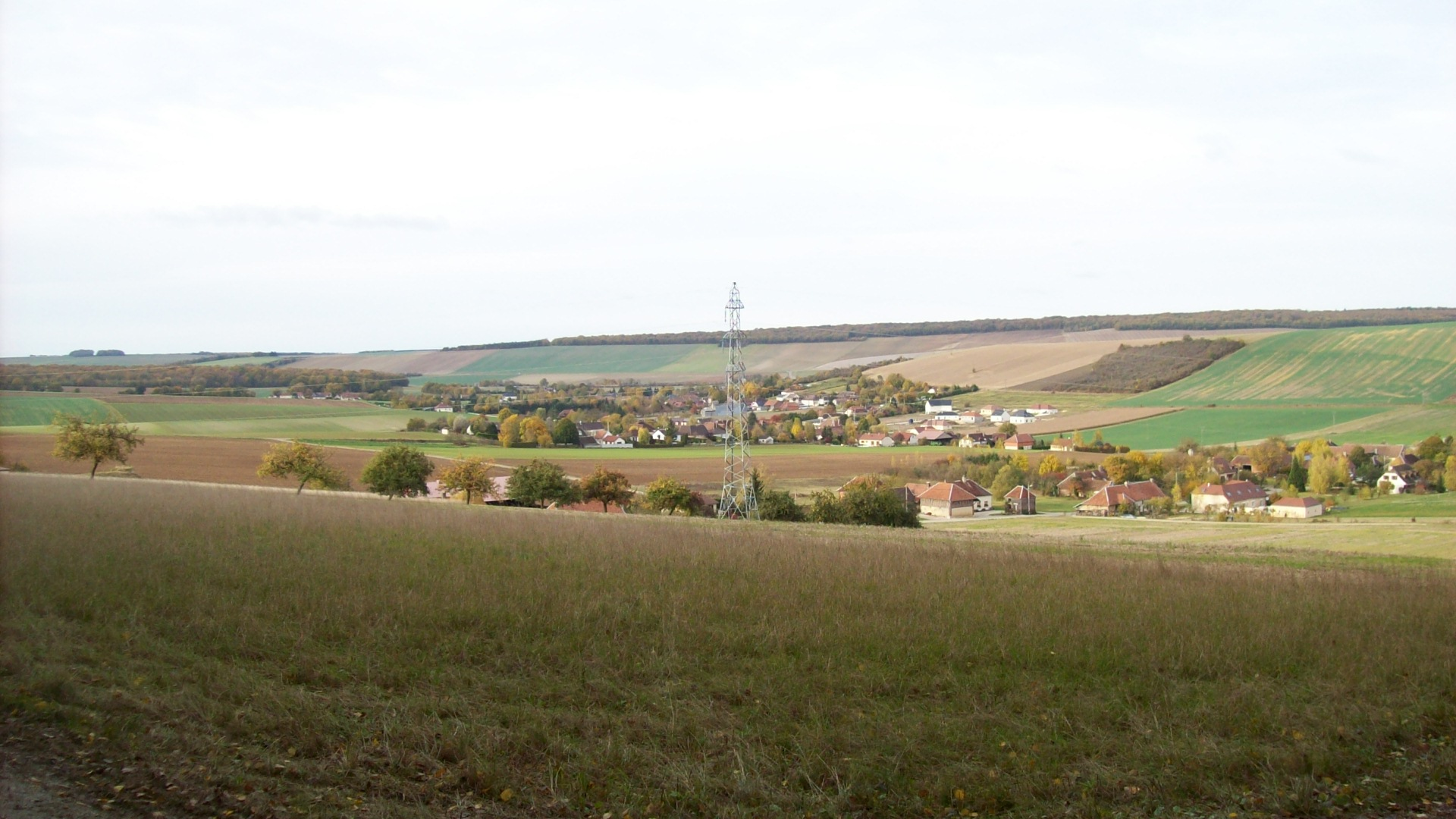
- A general view of Messon

- Coat of arms
- Location of Messon
- Location within France Location within Grand Est
- Coordinates: 48°15′56″N 3°54′26″E
- Country: France
- Region: Grand Est
- Department: Aube
- Arrondissement: Troyes
- Canton: Aix-Villemaur-Pâlis
- Intercommunality: CA Troyes Champagne Métropole

Government
  - Mayor (2020–2026): Jean-Christophe Courtois
- Area^{1}: 11.49 km^{2} (4.44 sq mi)
- Elevation: 156 m (512 ft)
- Highest elevation: 250 m (820 ft)
- Lowest elevation: 151 m (495 ft)
- Population (2023): 465
  - Density: 40.5/km^{2} (105/sq mi)
- Time zone: UTC+01:00 (CET)
  - Summer (DST): UTC+02:00 (CEST)
- INSEE/Postal code: 10240 /10190
- ^{1} French Land Register data, which excludes lakes, ponds, glaciers > 1 km^{2} (0.386 sq mi or 247 acres) and river estuaries.

Messon (French pronunciation: [mɛsɔ̃]) is a commune in the Aube department in north-central France.

== Population ==
Historical population
Year	Pop.	±% p.a.
1968	188	—
1975	205	+1.24%
1982	258	+3.34%
1990	302	+1.99%
1999	297	−0.19%
2007	422	+4.49%
2012	460	+1.74%
2017	466	+0.26%
2023	465	−0.04%
Source: INSEE

== See also ==
- Communes of the Aube department
