= Saint-Phal =

Commune in Grand Est, France

- Commune
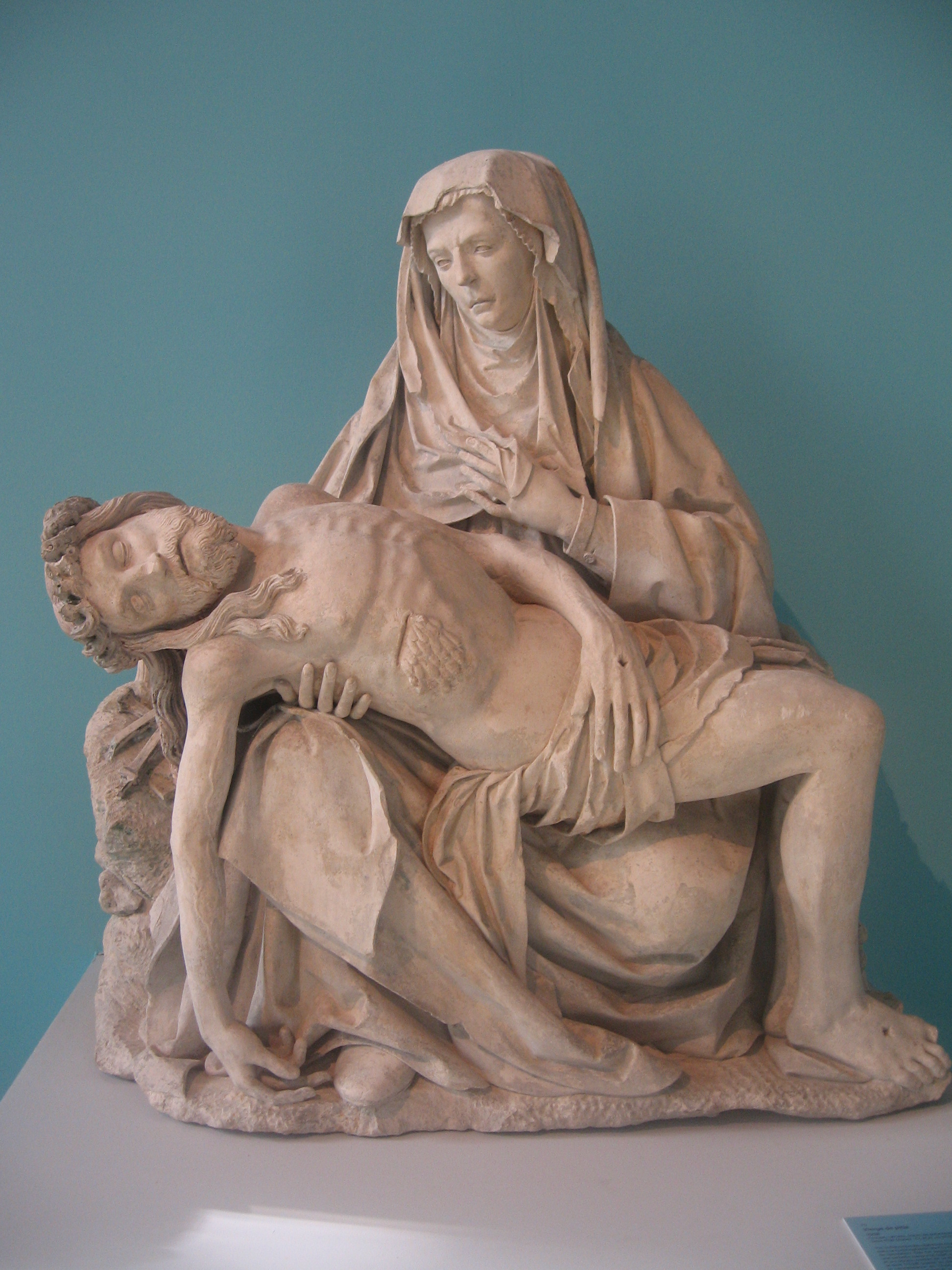
- Vierge de Pitié

- Coat of arms
- Location of Saint-Phal
- Location within France Location within Grand Est
- Coordinates: 48°07′21″N 3°59′53″E
- Country: France
- Region: Grand Est
- Department: Aube
- Arrondissement: Troyes
- Canton: Aix-Villemaur-Pâlis

Government
  - Mayor (2020–2026): Daniel Houard
- Area^{1}: 33.27 km^{2} (12.85 sq mi)
- Elevation: 180 m (590 ft)
- Population (2023): 521
  - Density: 15.7/km^{2} (40.6/sq mi)
- Time zone: UTC+01:00 (CET)
  - Summer (DST): UTC+02:00 (CEST)
- INSEE/Postal code: 10359 /10130
- ^{1} French Land Register data, which excludes lakes, ponds, glaciers > 1 km^{2} (0.386 sq mi or 247 acres) and river estuaries.

Saint-Phal (French pronunciation: [sɛ̃ fal]) is a commune in the Aube department in north-central France.

== Population ==
Historical population
| Year | Pop. | ±% p.a. |
|---|---|---|
| 1968 | 380 | — |
| 1975 | 383 | +0.11% |
| 1982 | 410 | +0.98% |
| 1990 | 467 | +1.64% |
| 1999 | 490 | +0.54% |
| 2007 | 524 | +0.84% |
| 2012 | 535 | +0.42% |
| 2017 | 523 | −0.45% |
| 2023 | 521 | −0.06% |
Source: INSEE

== See also ==
- Communes of the Aube department
