= Estissac =

Commune in Grand Est, France

- Commune
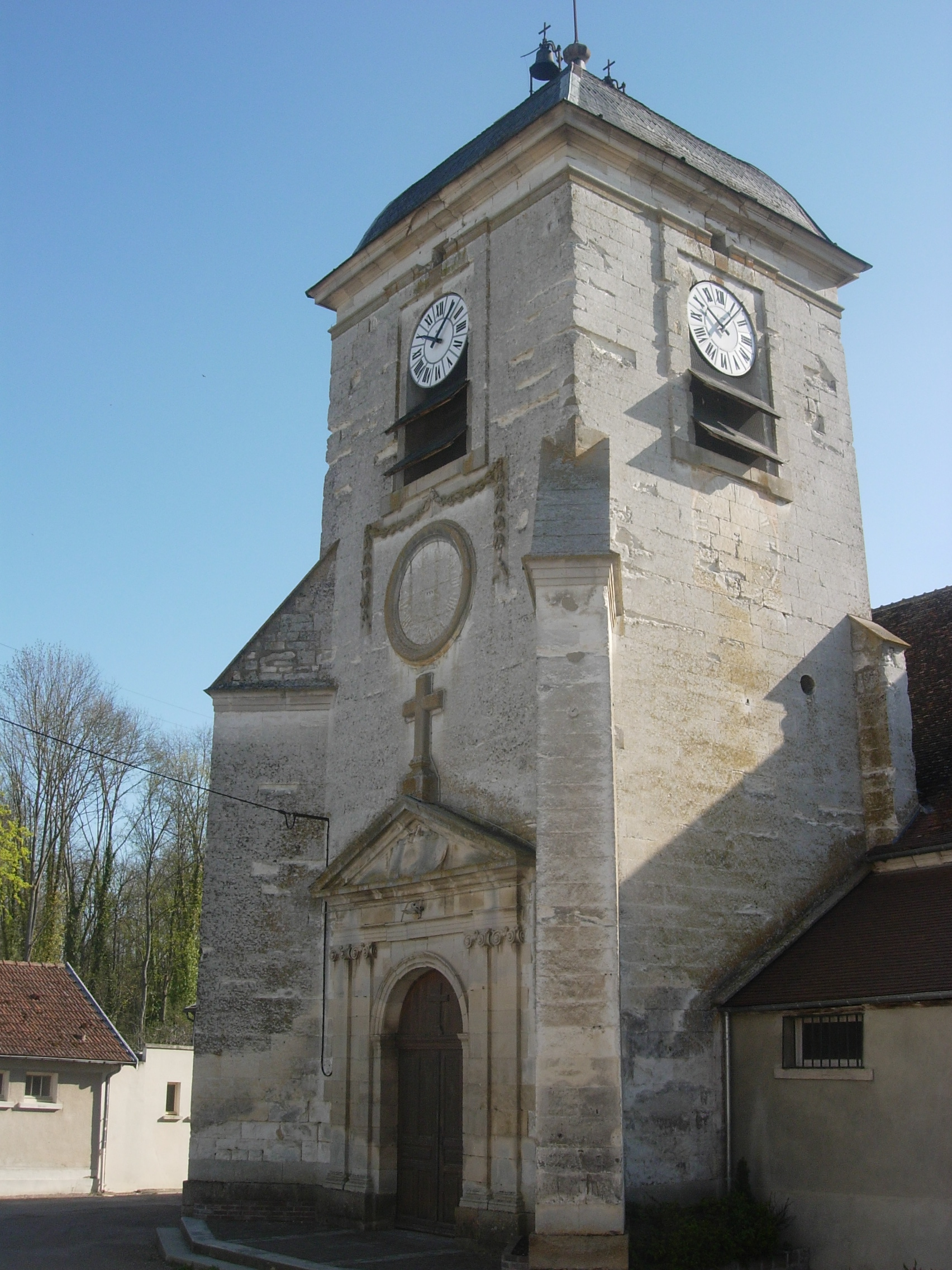
- The church in Estissac

- Coat of arms
- Location of Estissac
- Location within France Location within Grand Est
- Coordinates: 48°16′12″N 3°48′24″E
- Country: France
- Region: Grand Est
- Department: Aube
- Arrondissement: Troyes
- Canton: Aix-Villemaur-Pâlis
- Intercommunality: CA Troyes Champagne Métropole

Government
  - Mayor (2020–2026): Annie Duchêne
- Area^{1}: 25.66 km^{2} (9.91 sq mi)
- Elevation: 137 m (449 ft)
- Population (2023): 1,763
  - Density: 68.71/km^{2} (177.9/sq mi)
- Time zone: UTC+01:00 (CET)
  - Summer (DST): UTC+02:00 (CEST)
- INSEE/Postal code: 10142 /10190
- ^{1} French Land Register data, which excludes lakes, ponds, glaciers > 1 km^{2} (0.386 sq mi or 247 acres) and river estuaries.

Estissac (French pronunciation: [ɛstisak]) is a commune in the Aube department in north-central France.

== Population ==
Historical population
Year	Pop.	±% p.a.
1968	1,740	—
1975	1,761	+0.17%
1982	1,757	−0.03%
1990	1,611	−1.08%
1999	1,724	+0.76%
2007	1,790	+0.47%
2012	1,874	+0.92%
2017	1,855	−0.20%
2023	1,763	−0.84%
Source: INSEE

== See also ==
- Communes of the Aube department
