= Paisy-Cosdon =

Commune in Grand Est, France

- Commune
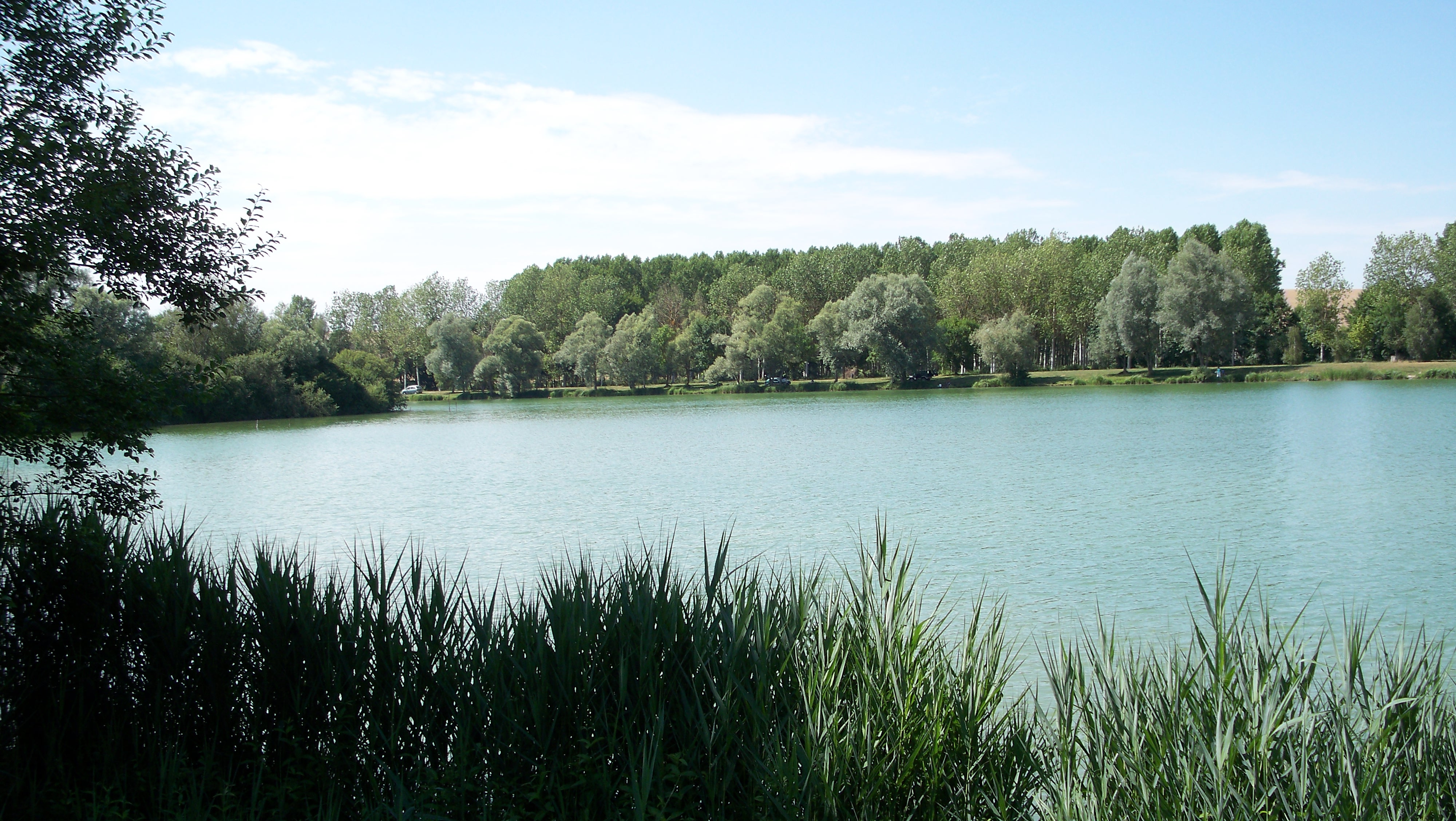
- Paisy-Cosdon Lake
- Location of Paisy-Cosdon
- Location within France Location within Grand Est
- Coordinates: 48°14′07″N 3°42′48″E
- Country: France
- Region: Grand Est
- Department: Aube
- Arrondissement: Troyes
- Canton: Aix-Villemaur-Pâlis

Government
  - Mayor (2020–2026): Gilbert Bonneterre
- Area^{1}: 17.84 km^{2} (6.89 sq mi)
- Elevation: 121 m (397 ft)
- Population (2023): 343
  - Density: 19.2/km^{2} (49.8/sq mi)
- Time zone: UTC+01:00 (CET)
  - Summer (DST): UTC+02:00 (CEST)
- INSEE/Postal code: 10276 /10160
- ^{1} French Land Register data, which excludes lakes, ponds, glaciers > 1 km^{2} (0.386 sq mi or 247 acres) and river estuaries.

Paisy-Cosdon (French pronunciation: [pɛzi kodɔ̃]) is a commune in the Aube department in north-central France.

== Population ==
Historical population
Year	Pop.	±% p.a.
1968	200	—
1975	202	+0.14%
1982	206	+0.28%
1990	247	+2.29%
1999	264	+0.74%
2007	302	+1.70%
2012	338	+2.28%
2017	338	+0.00%
2023	343	+0.25%
Source: INSEE

== See also ==
- Communes of the Aube department
