= Fontvannes =

Commune in Grand Est, France

- Commune
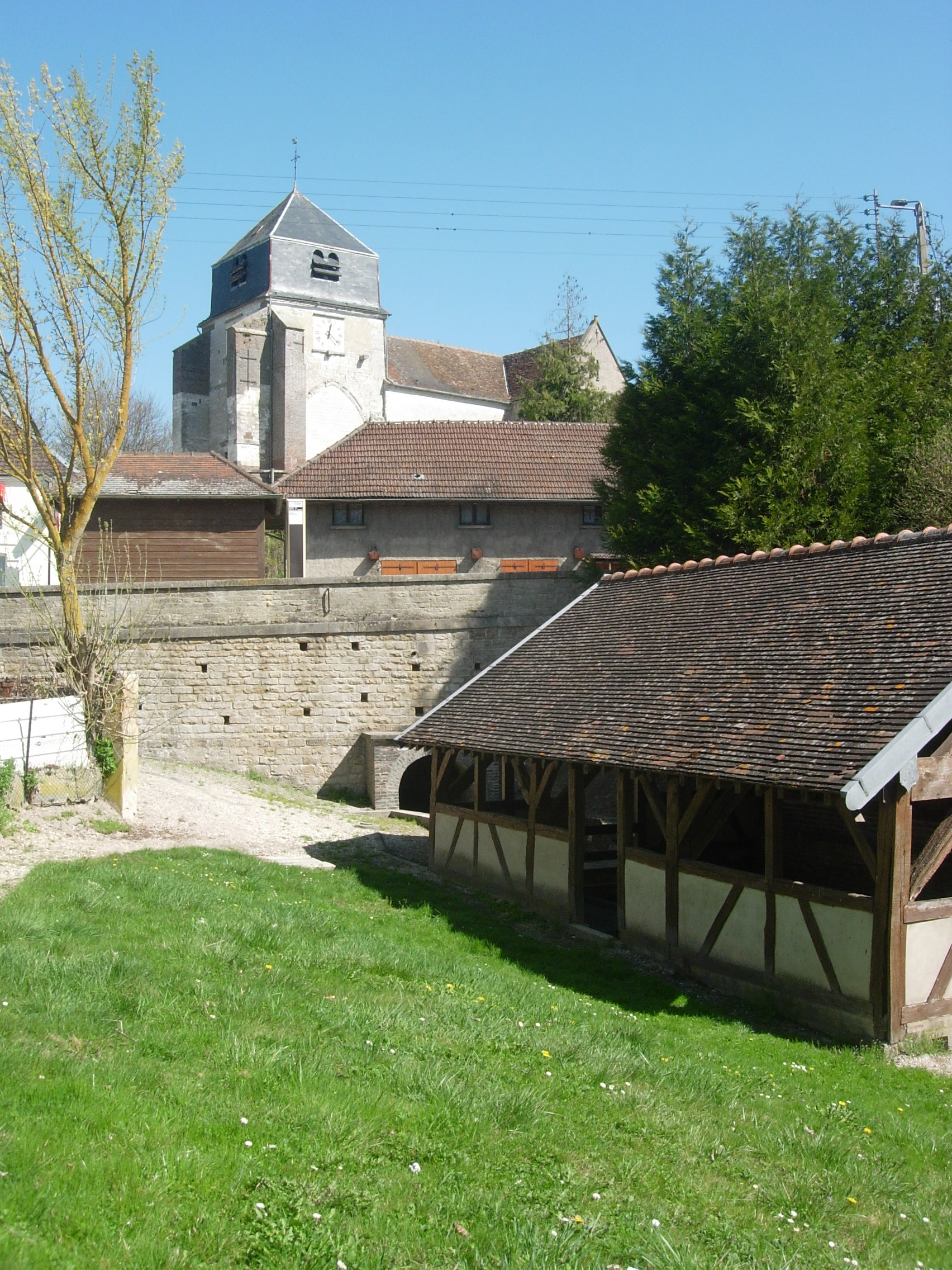
- The church and wash house in Fontvannes

- Coat of arms
- Location of Fontvannes
- Location within France Location within Grand Est
- Coordinates: 48°16′47″N 3°52′25″E
- Country: France
- Region: Grand Est
- Department: Aube
- Arrondissement: Troyes
- Canton: Aix-Villemaur-Pâlis
- Intercommunality: CA Troyes Champagne Métropole

Government
  - Mayor (2020–2026): Didier Leprince
- Area^{1}: 13.01 km^{2} (5.02 sq mi)
- Elevation: 150 m (490 ft)
- Highest elevation: 237 m (778 ft)
- Lowest elevation: 142 m (466 ft)
- Population (2023): 707
  - Density: 54.3/km^{2} (141/sq mi)
- Time zone: UTC+01:00 (CET)
  - Summer (DST): UTC+02:00 (CEST)
- INSEE/Postal code: 10156 /10190
- ^{1} French Land Register data, which excludes lakes, ponds, glaciers > 1 km^{2} (0.386 sq mi or 247 acres) and river estuaries.

Fontvannes (French pronunciation: [fɔ̃van]) is a commune in the Aube department in north-central France.

== Population ==
Historical population
Year	Pop.	±% p.a.
1968	297	—
1975	340	+1.95%
1982	461	+4.45%
1990	563	+2.53%
1999	553	−0.20%
2007	552	−0.02%
2012	635	+2.84%
2017	717	+2.46%
2023	707	−0.23%
Source: INSEE

== See also ==
- Communes of the Aube department
