= Planty, Aube =

Commune in Grand Est, France

Planty
- Commune
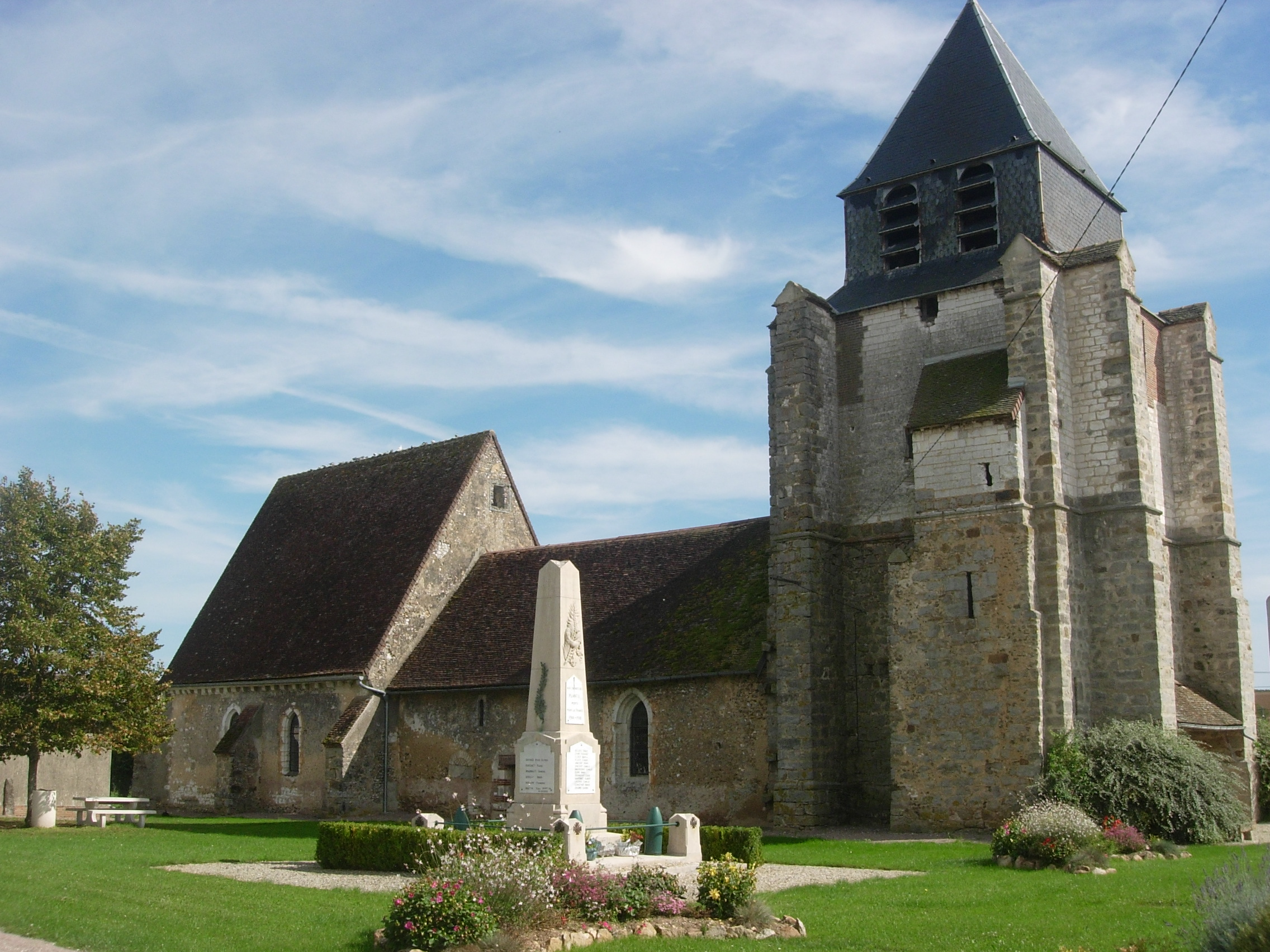
- The church in Planty
- Location of Planty
- Location within France Location within Grand Est
- Coordinates: 48°16′20″N 3°39′15″E
- Country: France
- Region: Grand Est
- Department: Aube
- Arrondissement: Troyes
- Canton: Aix-Villemaur-Pâlis

Government
  - Mayor (2020–2026): Claude Lenoir
- Area^{1}: 10.82 km^{2} (4.18 sq mi)
- Elevation: 190 m (620 ft)
- Population (2023): 229
  - Density: 21.2/km^{2} (54.8/sq mi)
- Time zone: UTC+01:00 (CET)
  - Summer (DST): UTC+02:00 (CEST)
- INSEE/Postal code: 10290 /10160
- ^{1} French Land Register data, which excludes lakes, ponds, glaciers > 1 km^{2} (0.386 sq mi or 247 acres) and river estuaries.

Planty (French pronunciation: [plɑ̃ti]) is a commune in the Aube department in north-central France.

== Population ==
Historical population
Year	Pop.	±% p.a.
1968	256	—
1975	217	−2.33%
1982	177	−2.87%
1990	144	−2.55%
1999	168	+1.73%
2007	178	+0.73%
2012	221	+4.42%
2017	242	+1.83%
2023	229	−0.92%
Source: INSEE

== See also ==
- Communes of the Aube department
