= Coursan-en-Othe =

Commune in Grand Est, France

- Commune
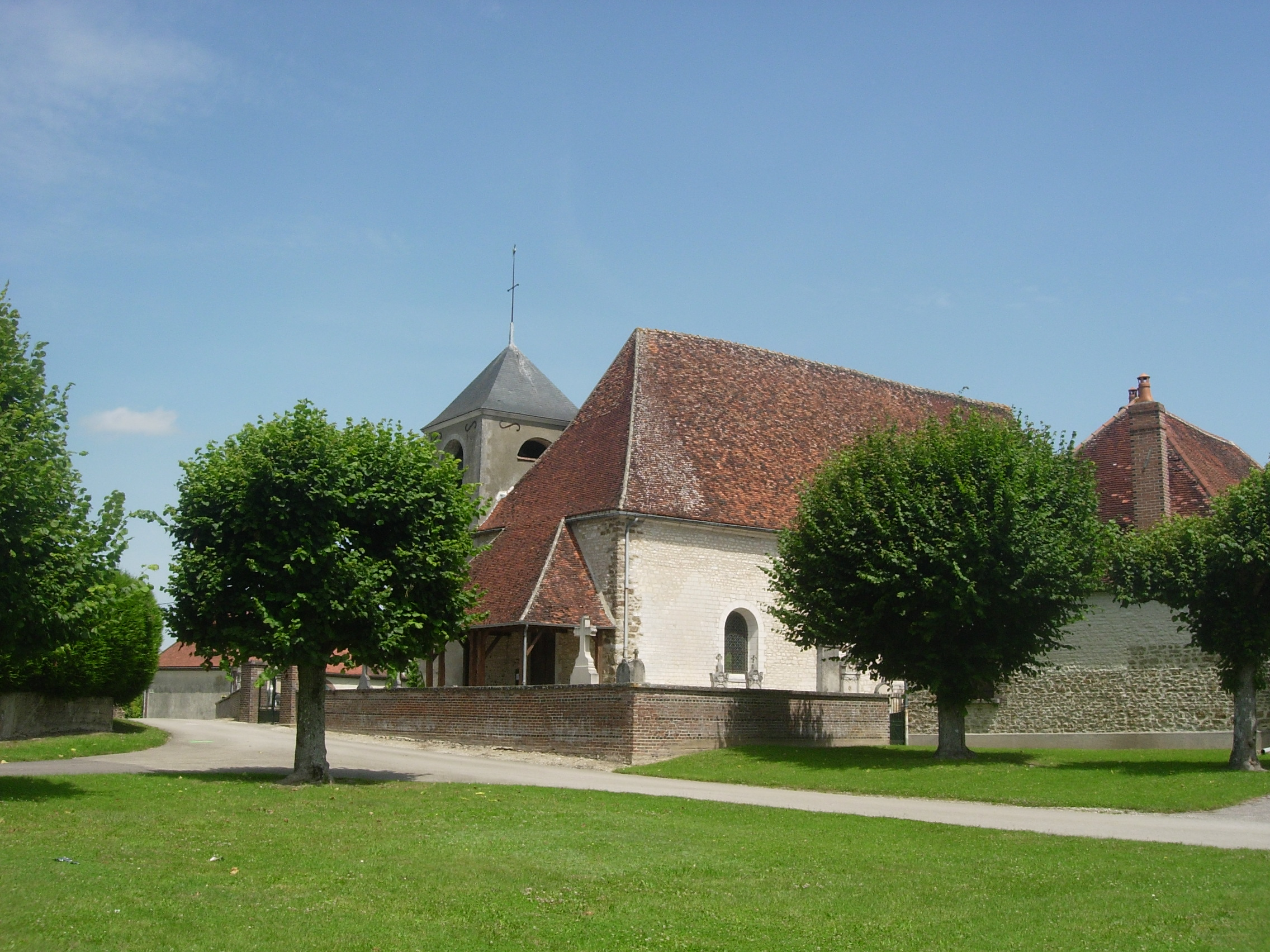
- The church in Coursan-en-Othe

- Coat of arms
- Location of Coursan-en-Othe
- Location within France Location within Grand Est
- Coordinates: 48°04′21″N 3°50′23″E
- Country: France
- Region: Grand Est
- Department: Aube
- Arrondissement: Troyes
- Canton: Aix-Villemaur-Pâlis

Government
  - Mayor (2020–2026): Chantal Marquais-Gourdon
- Area^{1}: 9.27 km^{2} (3.58 sq mi)
- Elevation: 150 m (490 ft)
- Population (2023): 100
  - Density: 11/km^{2} (28/sq mi)
- Time zone: UTC+01:00 (CET)
  - Summer (DST): UTC+02:00 (CEST)
- INSEE/Postal code: 10107 /10130
- ^{1} French Land Register data, which excludes lakes, ponds, glaciers > 1 km^{2} (0.386 sq mi or 247 acres) and river estuaries.

Coursan-en-Othe (French pronunciation: [kuʁsɑ̃ ɑ̃.n‿ɔt], lit. 'Coursan in Othe') is a commune in the Aube department in north-central France.

== Population ==
Historical population
Year	Pop.	±% p.a.
1968	104	—
1975	114	+1.32%
1982	99	−2.00%
1990	103	+0.50%
1999	97	−0.66%
2007	99	+0.26%
2012	100	+0.20%
2017	105	+0.98%
2023	100	−0.81%
Source: INSEE

== See also ==
- Communes of the Aube department
