= Saint-Benoist-sur-Vanne =

Commune in Grand Est, France

- Commune
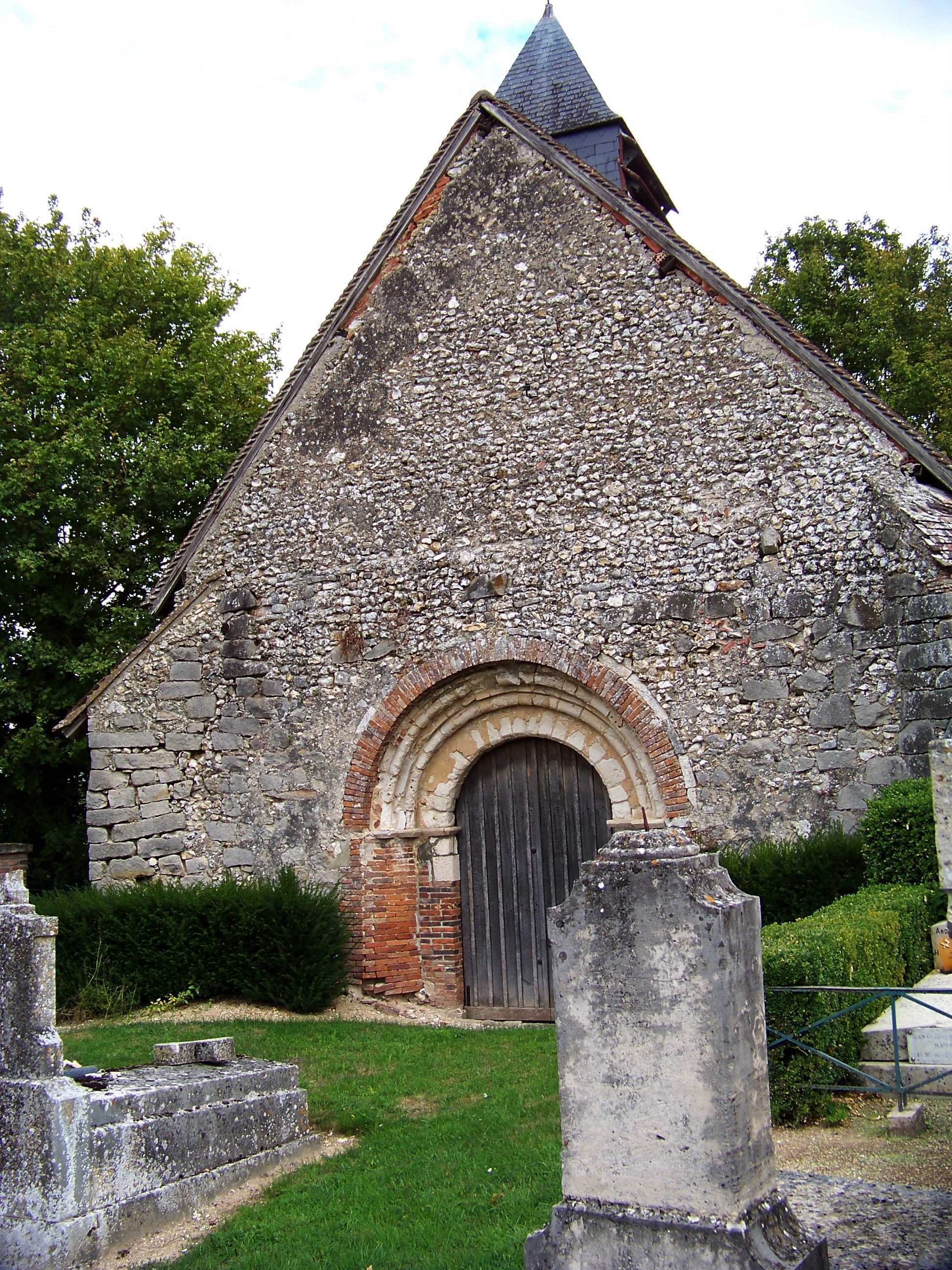
- The Courmononcle chapel in Saint-Benoist-sur-Vanne
- Location of Saint-Benoist-sur-Vanne
- Location within France Location within Grand Est
- Coordinates: 48°14′12″N 3°40′16″E
- Country: France
- Region: Grand Est
- Department: Aube
- Arrondissement: Troyes
- Canton: Aix-Villemaur-Pâlis

Government
  - Mayor (2020–2026): Laurent L'Etrop
- Area^{1}: 16.68 km^{2} (6.44 sq mi)
- Elevation: 126 m (413 ft)
- Population (2023): 228
  - Density: 13.7/km^{2} (35.4/sq mi)
- Time zone: UTC+01:00 (CET)
  - Summer (DST): UTC+02:00 (CEST)
- INSEE/Postal code: 10335 /10160
- ^{1} French Land Register data, which excludes lakes, ponds, glaciers > 1 km^{2} (0.386 sq mi or 247 acres) and river estuaries.

Saint-Benoist-sur-Vanne (French pronunciation: [sɛ̃ bənwa syʁ van]) is a commune in the Aube department in north-central France.

== Population ==
Historical population
Year	Pop.	±% p.a.
1968	244	—
1975	235	−0.54%
1982	230	−0.31%
1990	198	−1.86%
1999	214	+0.87%
2007	237	+1.28%
2012	235	−0.17%
2017	237	+0.17%
2023	228	−0.64%
Source: INSEE

== See also ==
- Communes of the Aube department
