= Vauchassis =

Commune in Grand Est, France

- Commune
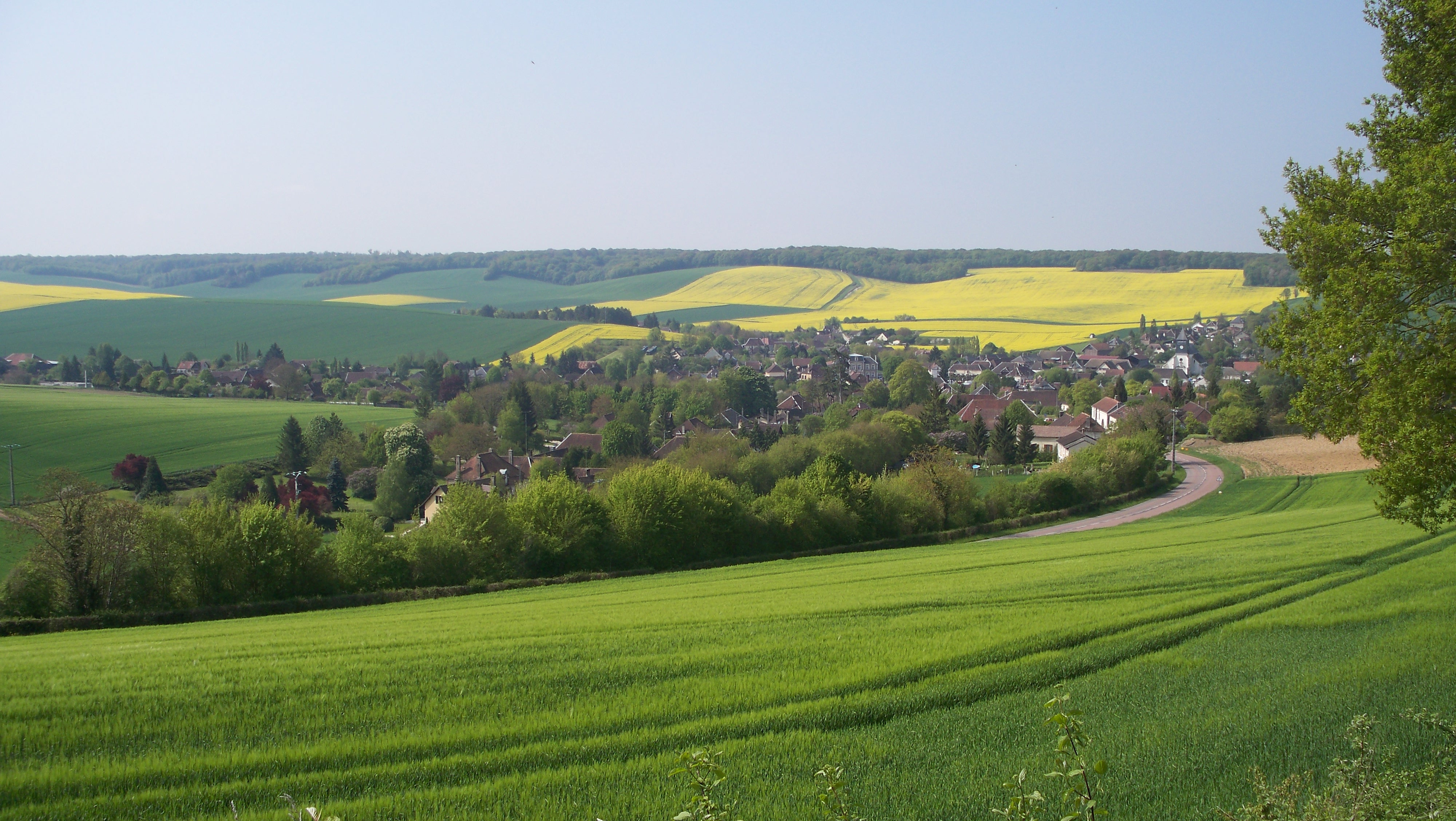
- A general view of Vauchassis

- Coat of arms
- Location of Vauchassis
- Location within France Location within Grand Est
- Coordinates: 48°13′25″N 3°55′31″E
- Country: France
- Region: Grand Est
- Department: Aube
- Arrondissement: Troyes
- Canton: Aix-Villemaur-Pâlis
- Intercommunality: CA Troyes Champagne Métropole

Government
  - Mayor (2020–2026): Bruno Martinot
- Area^{1}: 24.17 km^{2} (9.33 sq mi)
- Elevation: 176 m (577 ft)
- Population (2023): 502
  - Density: 20.8/km^{2} (53.8/sq mi)
- Time zone: UTC+01:00 (CET)
  - Summer (DST): UTC+02:00 (CEST)
- INSEE/Postal code: 10396 /10190
- ^{1} French Land Register data, which excludes lakes, ponds, glaciers > 1 km^{2} (0.386 sq mi or 247 acres) and river estuaries.

Vauchassis (French pronunciation: [voʃasi]) is a commune in the Aube department in north-central France.

== Population ==
Historical population
Year	Pop.	±% p.a.
1968	353	—
1975	400	+1.80%
1982	417	+0.60%
1990	488	+1.98%
1999	491	+0.07%
2007	519	+0.70%
2012	510	−0.35%
2017	503	−0.28%
2023	502	−0.03%
Source: INSEE

== See also ==
- Communes of the Aube department
