= Maroilles =

Maroilles may refer to:

- Maroilles, Nord, a commune in France
  - Maroilles Abbey, a Benedictine abbey in Maroilles, Nord
  - Maroilles cheese, a cheese made in Maroilles Abbey
