= Chessy-les-Prés =

Commune in Grand Est, France

- Commune
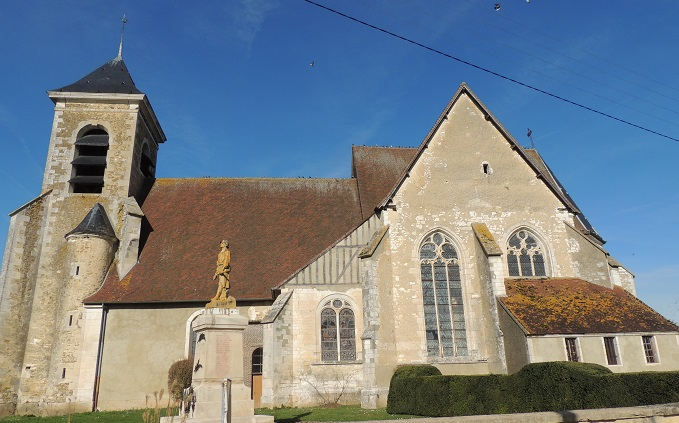
- The church in Chessy-les-Prés

- Coat of arms
- Location of Chessy-les-Prés
- Location within France Location within Grand Est
- Coordinates: 48°01′31″N 3°54′55″E
- Country: France
- Region: Grand Est
- Department: Aube
- Arrondissement: Troyes
- Canton: Aix-Villemaur-Pâlis

Government
  - Mayor (2020–2026): Christian De Bruin
- Area^{1}: 25.69 km^{2} (9.92 sq mi)
- Elevation: 130 m (430 ft)
- Population (2023): 534
  - Density: 20.8/km^{2} (53.8/sq mi)
- Time zone: UTC+01:00 (CET)
  - Summer (DST): UTC+02:00 (CEST)
- INSEE/Postal code: 10099 /10130
- ^{1} French Land Register data, which excludes lakes, ponds, glaciers > 1 km^{2} (0.386 sq mi or 247 acres) and river estuaries.

Chessy-les-Prés (French pronunciation: [ʃesi le pʁe]) is a commune in the Aube department in north-central France.

== Geography ==
This commune is part of the wet Champagne region, with meadows and wetlands; it is a livestock farming area.

== Heraldry ==
Chessy-les-Prés	Divided: 1st party, I gules an oak argent, II or a trefoil vert, 2nd azure a bend argent cotised by two gold bars potent counter-potent inwards.

== Population ==
Historical population
Year	Pop.	±% p.a.
1968	497	—
1975	481	−0.47%
1982	476	−0.15%
1990	509	+0.84%
1999	504	−0.11%
2007	523	+0.46%
2012	529	+0.23%
2017	501	−1.08%
2023	534	+1.07%
Source: INSEE

== See also ==
- Communes of the Aube department
