= Chamoy, Aube =

Commune in Grand Est, France

Chamoy
- Commune
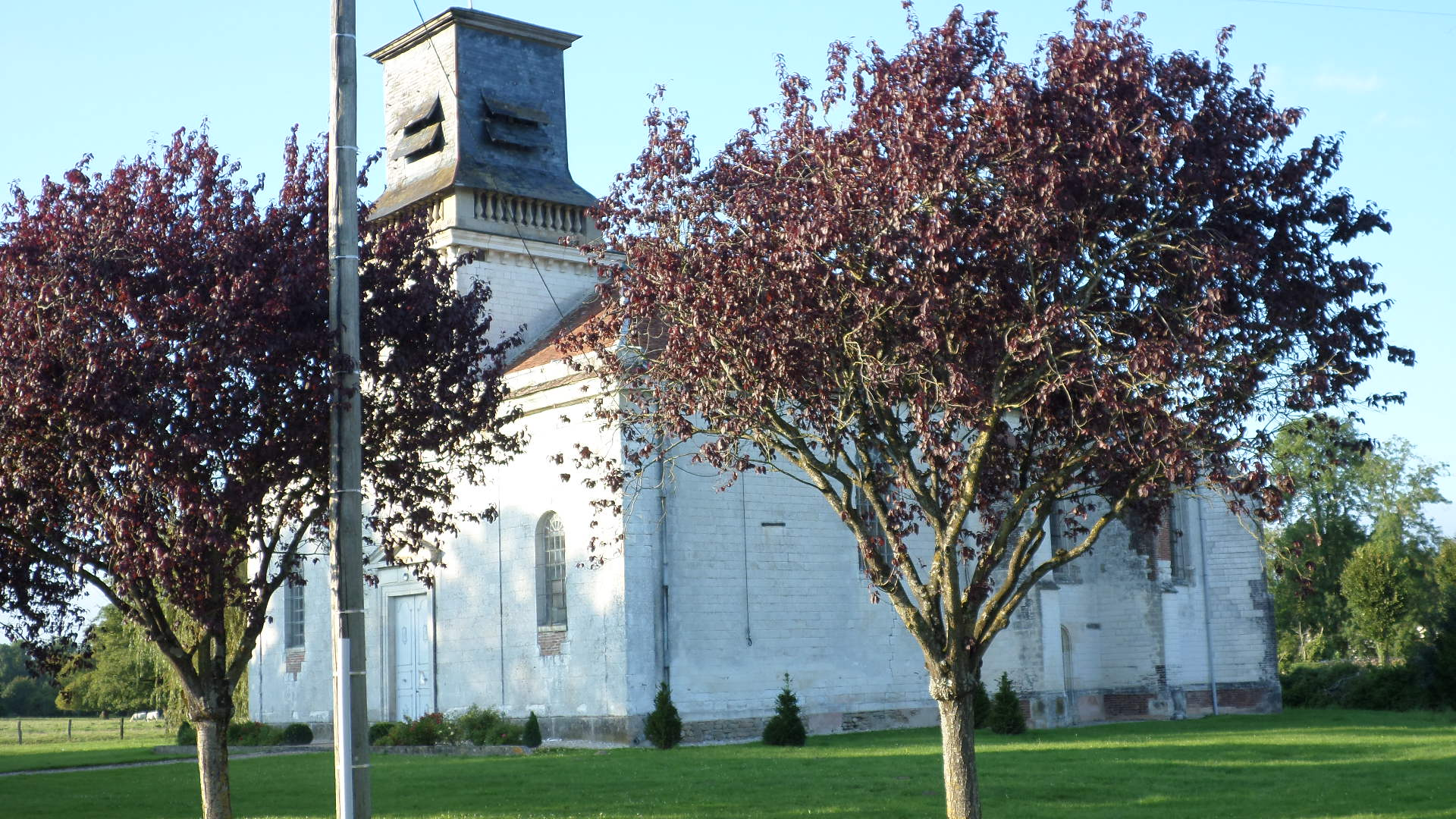
- The church in Chamoy

- Coat of arms
- Location of Chamoy
- Location within France Location within Grand Est
- Coordinates: 48°07′08″N 3°58′15″E
- Country: France
- Region: Grand Est
- Department: Aube
- Arrondissement: Troyes
- Canton: Aix-Villemaur-Pâlis

Government
  - Mayor (2020–2026): Roland Massart
- Area^{1}: 16.7 km^{2} (6.4 sq mi)
- Elevation: 152 m (499 ft)
- Population (2023): 499
  - Density: 29.9/km^{2} (77.4/sq mi)
- Time zone: UTC+01:00 (CET)
  - Summer (DST): UTC+02:00 (CEST)
- INSEE/Postal code: 10074 /10130
- ^{1} French Land Register data, which excludes lakes, ponds, glaciers > 1 km^{2} (0.386 sq mi or 247 acres) and river estuaries.

Chamoy (French pronunciation: [ʃamwa]) is a commune in the Aube department in north-central France.

== Population ==
Historical population
Year	Pop.	±% p.a.
1968	325	—
1975	291	−1.57%
1982	386	+4.12%
1990	446	+1.82%
1999	425	−0.53%
2007	469	+1.24%
2012	478	+0.38%
2017	508	+1.22%
2023	499	−0.30%
Source: INSEE

== See also ==
- Communes of the Aube department
