= Marolles-sous-Lignières =

Commune in Grand Est, France

- Commune
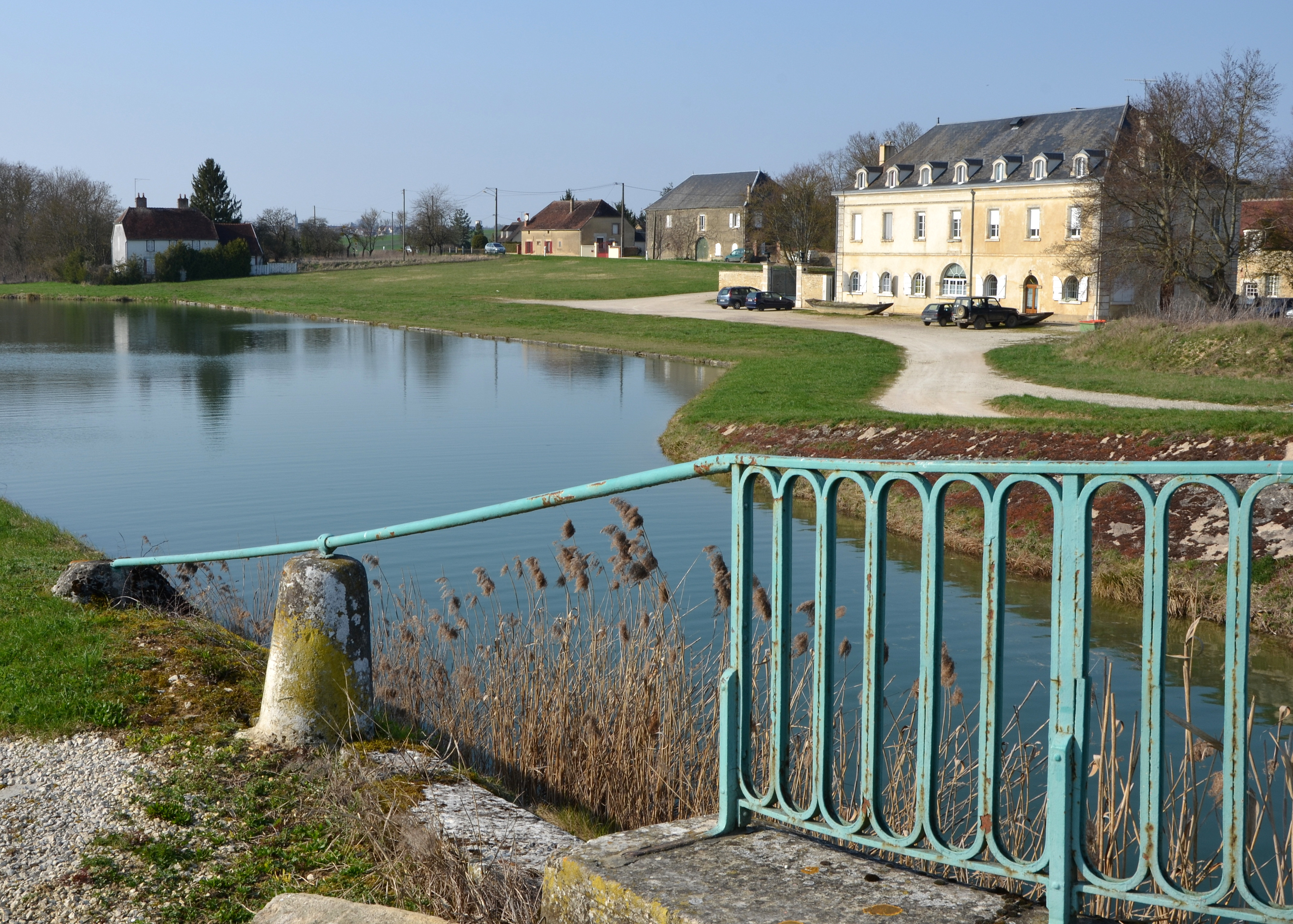
- The Burgundy canal in Marolles-sous-Lignières
- Location of Marolles-sous-Lignières
- Location within France Location within Grand Est
- Coordinates: 47°57′00″N 3°55′09″E
- Country: France
- Region: Grand Est
- Department: Aube
- Arrondissement: Troyes
- Canton: Aix-Villemaur-Pâlis

Government
  - Mayor (2020–2026): Alain Lieutier
- Area^{1}: 15.12 km^{2} (5.84 sq mi)
- Elevation: 188 m (617 ft)
- Population (2023): 371
  - Density: 24.5/km^{2} (63.6/sq mi)
- Time zone: UTC+01:00 (CET)
  - Summer (DST): UTC+02:00 (CEST)
- INSEE/Postal code: 10227 /10130
- ^{1} French Land Register data, which excludes lakes, ponds, glaciers > 1 km^{2} (0.386 sq mi or 247 acres) and river estuaries.

Marolles-sous-Lignières (French pronunciation: [maʁɔl su liɲjɛʁ]; literally "Marolles under Lignières") is a commune in the Aube department in north-central France.

== Population ==
Historical population
Year	Pop.	±% p.a.
1968	314	—
1975	260	−2.66%
1982	275	+0.80%
1990	299	+1.05%
1999	304	+0.18%
2007	317	+0.52%
2012	329	+0.75%
2017	333	+0.24%
2023	371	+1.82%
Source: INSEE

== See also ==
- Communes of the Aube department
