= Davrey =

Commune in Grand Est, France

- Commune
- Location of Davrey
- Location within France Location within Grand Est
- Coordinates: 48°03′07″N 3°57′05″E
- Country: France
- Region: Grand Est
- Department: Aube
- Arrondissement: Troyes
- Canton: Aix-Villemaur-Pâlis

Government
  - Mayor (2021–2026): José Smolinska
- Area^{1}: 9.66 km^{2} (3.73 sq mi)
- Elevation: 125 m (410 ft)
- Population (2023): 229
  - Density: 23.7/km^{2} (61.4/sq mi)
- Time zone: UTC+01:00 (CET)
  - Summer (DST): UTC+02:00 (CEST)
- INSEE/Postal code: 10122 /10130
- ^{1} French Land Register data, which excludes lakes, ponds, glaciers > 1 km^{2} (0.386 sq mi or 247 acres) and river estuaries.

Davrey (French pronunciation: [davʁɛ]) is a commune in the Aube department in north-central France.

== Population ==
Historical population
Year	Pop.	±% p.a.
1968	283	—
1975	255	−1.48%
1982	241	−0.80%
1990	220	−1.13%
1999	235	+0.74%
2007	249	+0.73%
2012	264	+1.18%
2017	237	−2.13%
2023	229	−0.57%
Source: INSEE

== See also ==
- Communes of the Aube department
