= Balnot-la-Grange =

Commune in Grand Est, France

- Commune
- Location of Balnot-la-Grange
- Location within France Location within Grand Est
- Coordinates: 47°59′12″N 4°11′54″E
- Country: France
- Region: Grand Est
- Department: Aube
- Arrondissement: Troyes
- Canton: Les Riceys
- Intercommunality: CC du Chaourçois et du Val d'Armance

Government
  - Mayor (2020–2026): Patrice Nosley
- Area^{1}: 20.11 km^{2} (7.76 sq mi)
- Elevation: 315 m (1,033 ft)
- Population (2023): 111
  - Density: 5.52/km^{2} (14.3/sq mi)
- Time zone: UTC+01:00 (CET)
  - Summer (DST): UTC+02:00 (CEST)
- INSEE/Postal code: 10028 /10210
- ^{1} French Land Register data, which excludes lakes, ponds, glaciers > 1 km^{2} (0.386 sq mi or 247 acres) and river estuaries.

Balnot-la-Grange (French pronunciation: [ba(l)no la ɡʁɑ̃ʒ]) is a commune in the Aube department in the Grand Est region of north-central France.

== Geography ==
Balnot-la-Grange is located some 35 km south by south-east of Troyes and 22 km north-east of Tonnerre. Part of the southern border is the departmental border between Aube and Yonne. Access to the commune is by road D84 from Chesley in the west which passes through the village and continues north-east to Arrelles. The D34 from Maisons-lès-Chaource to Villiers-le-Bois passes through the west of the commune. The D125 comes from Bragelogne-Beauvoir in the south-east and passes through the village continuing north-west to join the D34 in the commune. The D17 from Pargues to Bagneux-la-Fosse passes through the north-eastern corner of the commune. The commune is mostly farmland with some forests west of the village.

The Marve river flows through the commune and the village from the south and continues north until it joins the Hozain near La Chapelle-d'Oze.

== History ==
In Gallo-Roman times three Roman roads left from Vertault (Vertillum, an important centre south of Côte-d'Or) towards the north. One of these ways passed through Chaource via Balnot-la-Grange.

Until the 16th century Balnot had only a barn - i.e., a farm belonging to the Abbey of Quincy. When the Abbey could not reclaim this ruined barn, it decided to break up the land and, according to an agreement in 1518, made a gift to every person wishing to settle there. The donation consisted of an arpent to build a house and outbuildings through a censive for the dwelling, a royalty for the fireplace, and the right to cultivate the land. New residents received the right to use the woods and a pond belonging to the abbey and, in addition, to earn release from serfdom. It was stipulated that the people could not assemble without the authorization of the abbot.

In 1775 the French economist Pierre Samuel du Pont de Nemours recommended three levels of assembly:

- the municipalities of the parish;
- the municipalities of the arrondissement or election of the district;
- the municipalities of the province.

The Royal settlement of 23 June 1787 required that each election be divided into six electoral arrondissements. That law was randomly applied and so the election of Bar-sur-Aube was divided into twelve arrondissements including that of Balnot-la-Grange. Its existence was brief as it served as an electoral boundary for only one vote.

== Administration ==
List of Successive Mayors

From	To	Name
	1857	Morel
2001	2008	Serge Hugerot
2008	2026	Patrice Nosley

== Demography ==
The inhabitants of the commune are known as Balnotiers or Balnotières in French.

Historical population

Year	Pop.	±% p.a.
1793	478	—
1821	451	−0.21%
1846	386	−0.62%
1872	364	−0.23%
1901	278	−0.93%
1926	250	−0.42%
1946	228	−0.46%
1962	221	−0.19%
1968	224	+0.22%

Year	Pop.	±% p.a.
1975	191	−2.25%
1982	181	−0.77%
1990	184	+0.21%
1999	158	−1.68%
2007	154	−0.32%
2012	125	−4.09%
2017	120	−0.81%
2023	111	−1.29%

Source: EHESS and INSEE

== Sites and monuments ==
The current Malassise Farm is a former mansion from the 16th century.

The Parish Church of the Nativity of Saint Vierge contains many items that are registered as historical objects:

- A Bust-Reliquary: Saint Bishop (17th century)
- Statues (18th century)
- Stained glass window: Tree of Jesse (16th century)
- A Bronze Bell (1737)
- 3 Holy Oil Ampules (19th century)
- A Ciborium (18th century)
- 3 Chalices with Patens (19th century)
- A Confessional (18th century)
- A Stall with desk (18th century)
- A Tombstone for Charles-Antoine Andras (1776)
- An Altar, Retable, and Painting: Notre-Dame de la Salette (19th century)
- A Sarcophagus
- A Baptismal font (16th century)
- A Painting: Saint Nicolas (1843)
- The main Altar, Retable, and Tabernacle (16th century)
- The Furniture in the Church

== See also ==
- Communes of the Aube department

=== External links ===
- Balnot-la-Grange on Géoportail, National Geographic Institute (IGN) website (in French)
- Balnot-la-Grange on the 1750 Cassini Map
