= Assenay =

Commune in Grand Est, France

- Commune
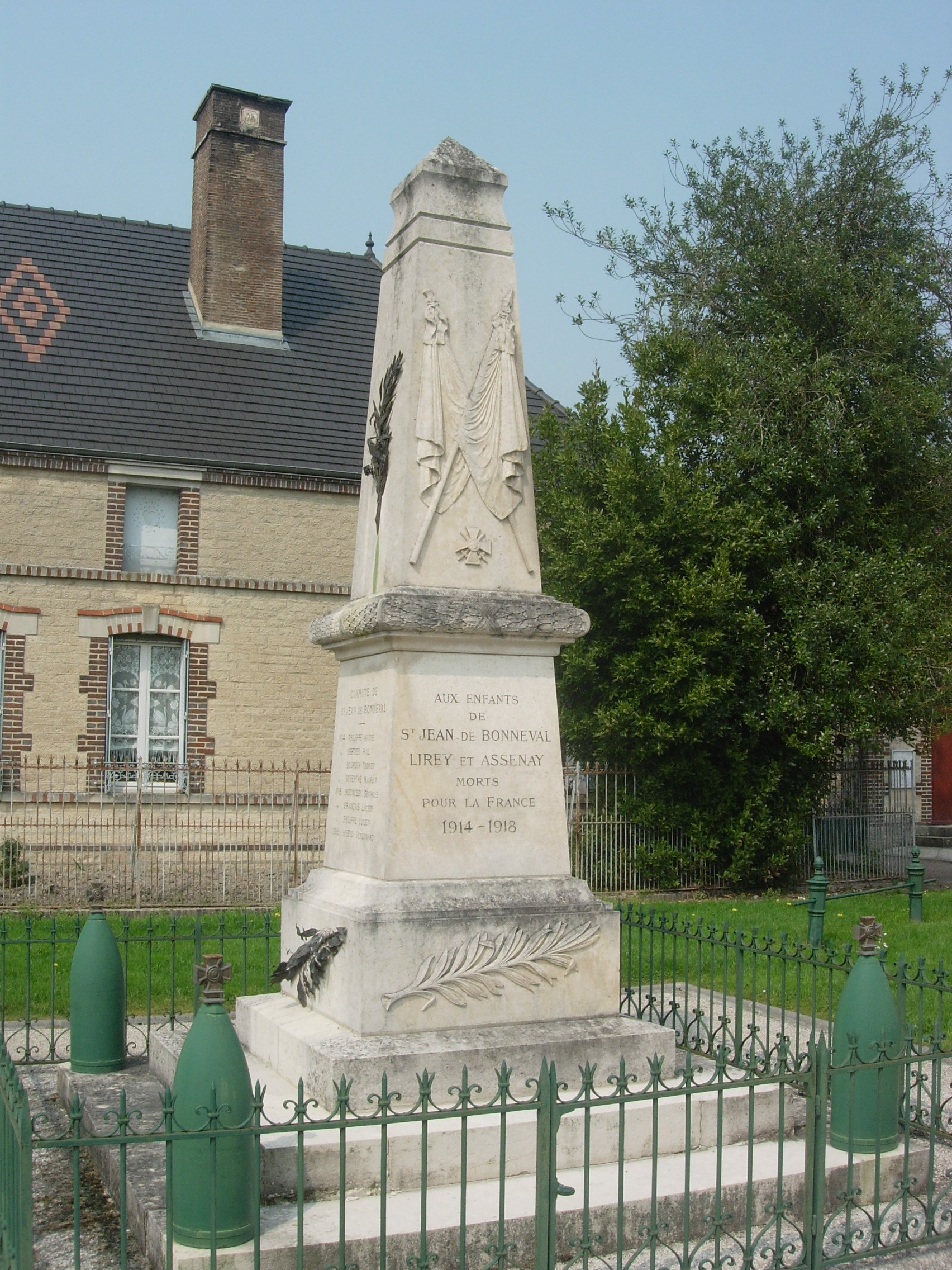
- War memorial
- Location of Assenay
- Location within France Location within Grand Est
- Coordinates: 48°11′00″N 4°03′36″E
- Country: France
- Region: Grand Est
- Department: Aube
- Arrondissement: Troyes
- Canton: Les Riceys
- Intercommunality: CA Troyes Champagne Métropole

Government
  - Mayor (2020–2026): David Garnerin
- Area^{1}: 3.42 km^{2} (1.32 sq mi)
- Elevation: 135 m (443 ft)
- Population (2023): 133
  - Density: 38.9/km^{2} (101/sq mi)
- Time zone: UTC+01:00 (CET)
  - Summer (DST): UTC+02:00 (CEST)
- INSEE/Postal code: 10013 /10320
- ^{1} French Land Register data, which excludes lakes, ponds, glaciers > 1 km^{2} (0.386 sq mi or 247 acres) and river estuaries.

Assenay is a commune in the Aube department in the Grand Est region of north-central France.

== Geography ==
Assenay is located some 12 km south of Saint-André-les-Vergers and 4 km east by north-east of Villery. Access to the commune is by the D1 23 road from Saint-Jean-de-Bonneval in the south-west passing through the village and continuing to Villy-le-Maréchal in the north-east. The D 25 road from Saint-Jean-de-Bonneval to Moussey also passes through the north of the commune. Apart from a few scattered patches of forest the commune is entirely farmland.

The Mogne river flows through the south of the commune from south-west to north-east. The Ruisseau d'Ormont flows eastwards through the village to join the Mogne east of the commune.

== Administration ==
List of Successive Mayors

From	To	Name	Party	Position
/1857		Horlot		
2001		David Garnerin		
2014	2020	Francine Baudouin		
2020	2026	Hubert Degois		
15 March 2026		David Garnerin		

== Demography ==
The inhabitants of the commune are known as Asnacussiens in French.

Historical population

Year	Pop.	±% p.a.
1793	157	—
1821	165	+0.18%
1846	150	−0.38%
1872	107	−1.29%
1901	77	−1.13%
1926	55	−1.34%
1946	44	−1.11%
1962	43	−0.14%
1968	46	+1.13%

Year	Pop.	±% p.a.
1975	64	+4.83%
1982	63	−0.22%
1990	77	+2.54%
1999	95	+2.36%
2007	141	+5.06%
2012	155	+1.91%
2017	146	−1.19%
2023	133	−1.54%

Source: EHESS and INSEE

== See also ==
- Communes of the Aube department
