= Villy =

Villy may refer to the following places:

- in France:
  - Villy, Ardennes, in the Ardennes département
  - Villy, Yonne, in the Yonne département
  - Villy Bocage, in the Calvados département
  - Villy-en-Auxois, in the Côte-d'Or département
  - Villy-en-Trodes, in the Aube département
  - Villy-le-Bois, in the Aube département
  - Villy-le-Bouveret, in the Haute-Savoie département
  - Villy-le-Maréchal, in the Aube département
  - Villy-le-Moutier, in the Côte-d'Or département
  - Villy-le-Pelloux, in the Haute-Savoie département
  - Villy lez Falaise, in the Calvados département
  - Villy-sur-Yères, in the Seine-Maritime département
- Villy, Burkina Faso, a town in central Burkina Faso

== See also ==
- Billy (disambiguation)
- Willy (disambiguation)
