= Maupas =

Maupas is the name of several communes in France and is a French surname:

- Maupas, Aube, a town in the Aube department
- Maupas, Gers, a town in the Gers department
- Émile Maupas (1842–1916), French zoologist and a botanist
- Nicolas Maupas (born 1998), Italian-French actor
- Charlemagne de Maupas (1818–1888), French lawyer and politician
