= Villiers-sous-Praslin =

Commune in Grand Est, France

- Commune
- Location of Villiers-sous-Praslin
- Location within France Location within Grand Est
- Coordinates: 48°03′46″N 4°14′54″E
- Country: France
- Region: Grand Est
- Department: Aube
- Arrondissement: Troyes
- Canton: Les Riceys

Government
  - Mayor (2020–2026): Sylviane Villin
- Area^{1}: 8.42 km^{2} (3.25 sq mi)
- Elevation: 243 m (797 ft)
- Population (2023): 66
  - Density: 7.8/km^{2} (20/sq mi)
- Time zone: UTC+01:00 (CET)
  - Summer (DST): UTC+02:00 (CEST)
- INSEE/Postal code: 10432 /10210
- ^{1} French Land Register data, which excludes lakes, ponds, glaciers > 1 km^{2} (0.386 sq mi or 247 acres) and river estuaries.

Villiers-sous-Praslin (French pronunciation: [vilje su pʁalɛ̃], literally Villiers under Praslin) is a commune in the Aube department in north-central France.

== Population ==
Historical population
Year	Pop.	±% p.a.
1968	102	—
1975	109	+0.95%
1982	97	−1.65%
1990	77	−2.85%
1999	60	−2.73%
2007	68	+1.58%
2012	70	+0.58%
2017	71	+0.28%
2023	66	−1.21%
Source: INSEE

== See also ==
- Communes of the Aube department
