= Vougrey =

Commune in Grand Est, France

- Commune
- Location of Vougrey
- Location within France Location within Grand Est
- Coordinates: 48°05′19″N 4°13′42″E
- Country: France
- Region: Grand Est
- Department: Aube
- Arrondissement: Troyes
- Canton: Les Riceys
- Intercommunality: Chaourçois et Val d'Armance

Government
  - Mayor (2020–2026): Yves Martin
- Area^{1}: 4.17 km^{2} (1.61 sq mi)
- Elevation: 200 m (660 ft)
- Highest elevation: 232 m (761 ft)
- Lowest elevation: 167 m (548 ft)
- Population (2023): 39
  - Density: 9.4/km^{2} (24/sq mi)
- Time zone: UTC+01:00 (CET)
  - Summer (DST): UTC+02:00 (CEST)
- INSEE/Postal code: 10443 /10210
- ^{1} French Land Register data, which excludes lakes, ponds, glaciers > 1 km^{2} (0.386 sq mi or 247 acres) and river estuaries.

Vougrey (French pronunciation: [vuɡʁɛ]) is a commune in the Aube department in north-central France.

== Population ==
Historical population
Year	Pop.	±% p.a.
1968	47	—
1975	50	+0.89%
1982	41	−2.80%
1990	46	+1.45%
1999	44	−0.49%
2007	55	+2.83%
2012	45	−3.93%
2017	48	+1.30%
2023	39	−3.40%
Source: INSEE

== See also ==
- Communes of the Aube department
