= Villemereuil =

Commune in Grand Est, France

- Commune
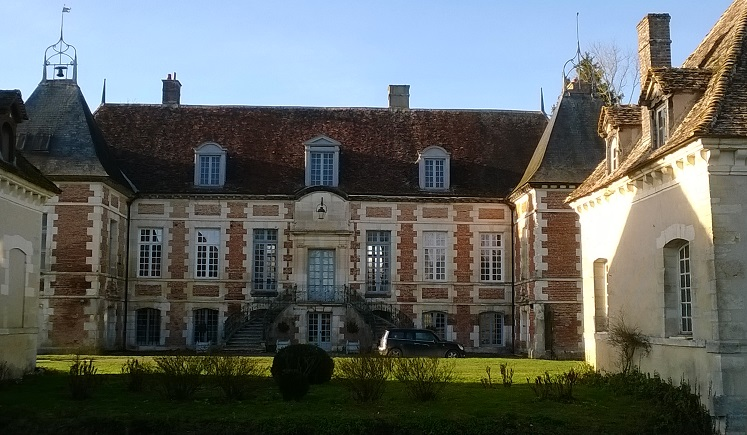
- The chateau in Villemereuil
- Location of Villemereuil
- Location within France Location within Grand Est
- Coordinates: 48°12′00″N 4°05′17″E
- Country: France
- Region: Grand Est
- Department: Aube
- Arrondissement: Troyes
- Canton: Les Riceys
- Intercommunality: CA Troyes Champagne Métropole

Government
  - Mayor (2020–2026): Gérard de Villemereuil
- Area^{1}: 7.81 km^{2} (3.02 sq mi)
- Elevation: 124 m (407 ft)
- Highest elevation: 146 m (479 ft)
- Lowest elevation: 117 m (384 ft)
- Population (2023): 236
  - Density: 30.2/km^{2} (78.3/sq mi)
- Time zone: UTC+01:00 (CET)
  - Summer (DST): UTC+02:00 (CEST)
- INSEE/Postal code: 10416 /10800
- ^{1} French Land Register data, which excludes lakes, ponds, glaciers > 1 km^{2} (0.386 sq mi or 247 acres) and river estuaries.

Villemereuil (French pronunciation: [vilməʁœj]) is a commune in the Aube department in north-central France.

== Population ==
Historical population
Year	Pop.	±% p.a.
1968	160	—
1975	165	+0.44%
1982	164	−0.09%
1990	225	+4.03%
1999	229	+0.20%
2007	239	+0.54%
2012	238	−0.08%
2017	247	+0.75%
2023	236	−0.76%
Source: INSEE

== See also ==
- Communes of the Aube department
