= Bouilly, Aube =

Commune in Grand Est, France

Bouilly
- Commune
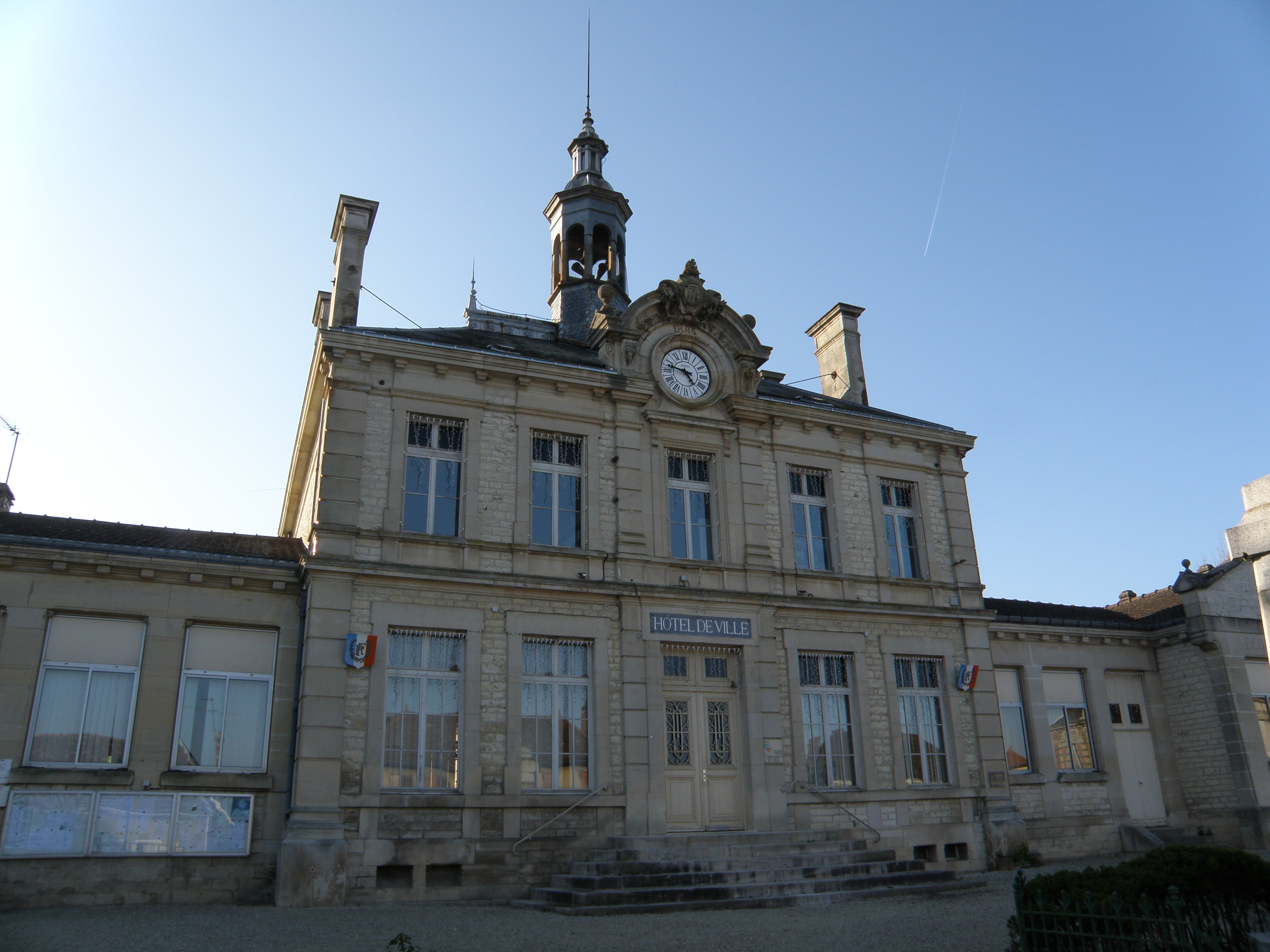
- The town hall in Bouilly

- Coat of arms
- Location of Bouilly
- Location within France Location within Grand Est
- Coordinates: 48°11′48″N 4°00′01″E
- Country: France
- Region: Grand Est
- Department: Aube
- Arrondissement: Troyes
- Canton: Les Riceys
- Intercommunality: CA Troyes Champagne Métropole

Government
  - Mayor (2020–2026): Benoît Groux
- Area^{1}: 15.49 km^{2} (5.98 sq mi)
- Elevation: 166 m (545 ft)
- Population (2023): 1,073
  - Density: 69.27/km^{2} (179.4/sq mi)
- Time zone: UTC+01:00 (CET)
  - Summer (DST): UTC+02:00 (CEST)
- INSEE/Postal code: 10051 /10320
- ^{1} French Land Register data, which excludes lakes, ponds, glaciers > 1 km^{2} (0.386 sq mi or 247 acres) and river estuaries.

Bouilly (French pronunciation: [buji]) is a commune in the Aube department in north-central France.

== Population ==
Historical population

Year	Pop.	±% p.a.
1793	667	—
1821	770	+0.51%
1846	838	+0.34%
1872	767	−0.34%
1901	593	−0.88%
1926	515	−0.56%
1946	557	+0.39%
1962	626	+0.73%
1968	725	+2.48%

Year	Pop.	±% p.a.
1975	1,008	+4.82%
1982	865	−2.16%
1990	1,000	+1.83%
1999	1,090	+0.96%
2007	1,045	−0.53%
2012	1,056	+0.21%
2017	1,074	+0.34%
2023	1,073	−0.02%

Source: EHESS and INSEE

== See also ==
- Communes of the Aube department
