= Vallières, Aube =

Commune in Grand Est, France

Vallières
- Commune
- Location of Vallières
- Location within France Location within Grand Est
- Coordinates: 47°59′49″N 4°03′38″E
- Country: France
- Region: Grand Est
- Department: Aube
- Arrondissement: Troyes
- Canton: Les Riceys

Government
  - Mayor (2020–2026): Daniel Blanc
- Area^{1}: 8.34 km^{2} (3.22 sq mi)
- Elevation: 236 m (774 ft)
- Population (2023): 167
  - Density: 20.0/km^{2} (51.9/sq mi)
- Time zone: UTC+01:00 (CET)
  - Summer (DST): UTC+02:00 (CEST)
- INSEE/Postal code: 10394 /10210
- ^{1} French Land Register data, which excludes lakes, ponds, glaciers > 1 km^{2} (0.386 sq mi or 247 acres) and river estuaries.

Vallières (French pronunciation: [valjɛʁ]) is a commune in the Aube department in north-central France.

== Population ==
Historical population
Year	Pop.	±% p.a.
1968	174	—
1975	137	−3.36%
1982	130	−0.75%
1990	134	+0.38%
1999	135	+0.08%
2007	135	+0.00%
2012	144	+1.30%
2017	150	+0.82%
2023	167	+1.81%
Source: INSEE

== See also ==
- Communes of the Aube department
