= Vanlay =

Commune in Grand Est, France

- Commune
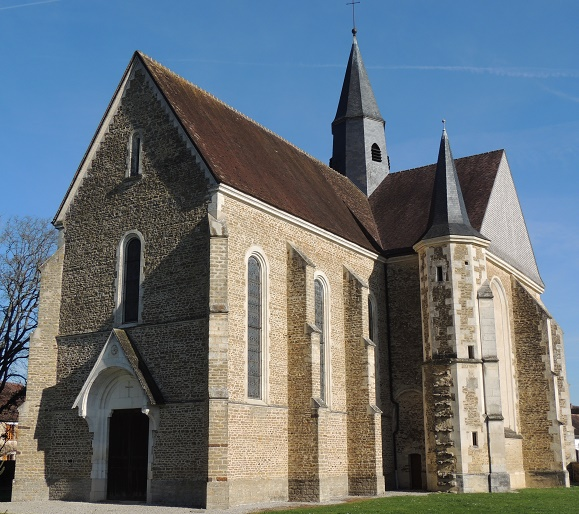
- The church in Vanlay
- Location of Vanlay
- Location within France Location within Grand Est
- Coordinates: 48°01′42″N 4°01′07″E
- Country: France
- Region: Grand Est
- Department: Aube
- Arrondissement: Troyes
- Canton: Les Riceys

Government
  - Mayor (2020–2026): Jérôme Perrin
- Area^{1}: 25.91 km^{2} (10.00 sq mi)
- Elevation: 145 m (476 ft)
- Population (2023): 284
  - Density: 11.0/km^{2} (28.4/sq mi)
- Time zone: UTC+01:00 (CET)
  - Summer (DST): UTC+02:00 (CEST)
- INSEE/Postal code: 10395 /10210
- ^{1} French Land Register data, which excludes lakes, ponds, glaciers > 1 km^{2} (0.386 sq mi or 247 acres) and river estuaries.

Vanlay (French pronunciation: [vɑ̃lɛ]) is a commune in the Aube department in north-central France.

== Population ==
Historical population
Year	Pop.	±% p.a.
1968	355	—
1975	288	−2.94%
1982	293	+0.25%
1990	290	−0.13%
1999	321	+1.13%
2007	312	−0.35%
2012	316	+0.26%
2017	304	−0.77%
2023	284	−1.13%
Source: INSEE

== See also ==
- Communes of the Aube department
