= Montceaux-lès-Vaudes =

Commune in Grand Est, France

- Commune
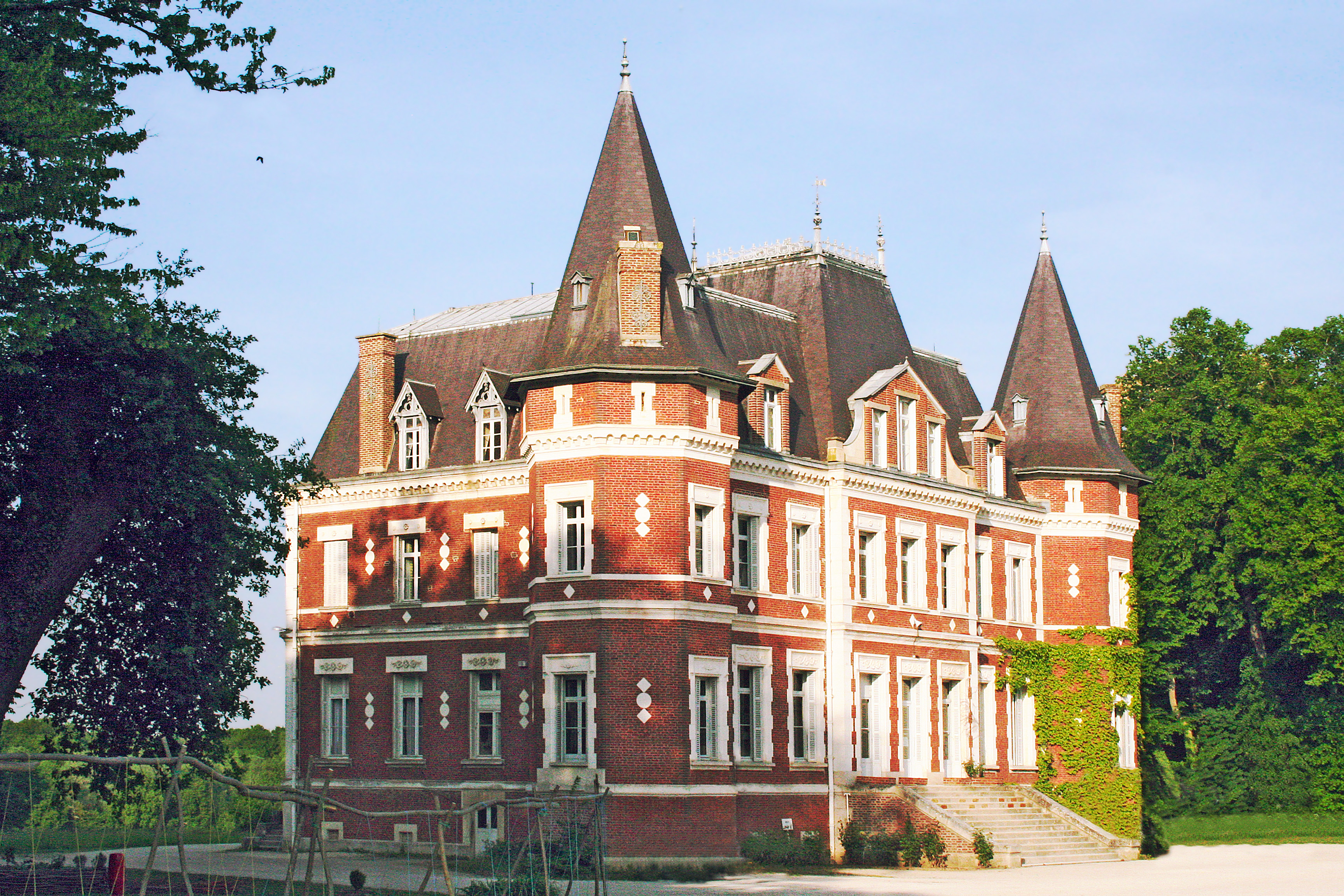
- The chateau in Montceaux-lès-Vaudes

- Coat of arms
- Location of Montceaux-lès-Vaudes
- Location within France Location within Grand Est
- Coordinates: 48°09′33″N 4°09′36″E
- Country: France
- Region: Grand Est
- Department: Aube
- Arrondissement: Troyes
- Canton: Les Riceys
- Intercommunality: CA Troyes Champagne Métropole

Government
  - Mayor (2020–2026): Alain Van De Rostyne
- Area^{1}: 10.11 km^{2} (3.90 sq mi)
- Elevation: 143 m (469 ft)
- Population (2023): 247
  - Density: 24.4/km^{2} (63.3/sq mi)
- Time zone: UTC+01:00 (CET)
  - Summer (DST): UTC+02:00 (CEST)
- INSEE/Postal code: 10246 /10260
- ^{1} French Land Register data, which excludes lakes, ponds, glaciers > 1 km^{2} (0.386 sq mi or 247 acres) and river estuaries.

Montceaux-lès-Vaudes (French pronunciation: [mɔ̃so lɛ vod], literally Montceaux near Vaudes) is a commune in the Aube department in north-central France.

== Population ==
Historical population
Year	Pop.	±% p.a.
1968	202	—
1975	179	−1.71%
1982	232	+3.77%
1990	223	−0.49%
1999	217	−0.30%
2007	244	+1.48%
2012	263	+1.51%
2017	256	−0.54%
2023	247	−0.59%
Source: INSEE

== See also ==
- Communes of the Aube department
