= Chaserey =

Commune in Grand Est, France

- Commune
- Location of Chaserey
- Location within France Location within Grand Est
- Coordinates: 47°57′32″N 4°04′09″E
- Country: France
- Region: Grand Est
- Department: Aube
- Arrondissement: Troyes
- Canton: Les Riceys

Government
  - Mayor (2020–2026): Ludovic Bayon
- Area^{1}: 6.86 km^{2} (2.65 sq mi)
- Elevation: 240 m (790 ft)
- Population (2023): 45
  - Density: 6.6/km^{2} (17/sq mi)
- Time zone: UTC+01:00 (CET)
  - Summer (DST): UTC+02:00 (CEST)
- INSEE/Postal code: 10087 /10210
- ^{1} French Land Register data, which excludes lakes, ponds, glaciers > 1 km^{2} (0.386 sq mi or 247 acres) and river estuaries.

Chaserey is a commune in the Aube department in north-central France.

== Population ==
Historical population
Year	Pop.	±% p.a.
1968	68	—
1975	65	−0.64%
1982	62	−0.67%
1990	57	−1.05%
1999	48	−1.89%
2007	48	+0.00%
2012	55	+2.76%
2017	54	−0.37%
2023	45	−2.99%
Source: INSEE

== See also ==
- Communes of the Aube department
