= Les Loges-Margueron =

Commune in Grand Est, France

- Commune
- Location of Les Loges-Margueron
- Location within France Location within Grand Est
- Coordinates: 48°05′15″N 4°06′37″E
- Country: France
- Region: Grand Est
- Department: Aube
- Arrondissement: Troyes
- Canton: Les Riceys
- Intercommunality: CC du Chaourçois et du Val d'Armance

Government
  - Mayor (2020–2026): Pascal Bougault
- Area^{1}: 31.21 km^{2} (12.05 sq mi)
- Elevation: 162 m (531 ft)
- Population (2023): 210
  - Density: 6.7/km^{2} (17/sq mi)
- Time zone: UTC+01:00 (CET)
  - Summer (DST): UTC+02:00 (CEST)
- INSEE/Postal code: 10202 /10210
- ^{1} French Land Register data, which excludes lakes, ponds, glaciers > 1 km^{2} (0.386 sq mi or 247 acres) and river estuaries.

Les Loges-Margueron (French pronunciation: [le lɔʒ maʁɡəʁɔ̃]) is a commune in the Aube department in north-central France.

== Population ==
Historical population
Year	Pop.	±% p.a.
1968	214	—
1975	170	−3.23%
1982	169	−0.08%
1990	151	−1.40%
1999	145	−0.45%
2007	221	+5.41%
2012	211	−0.92%
2017	201	−0.97%
2023	210	+0.73%
Source: INSEE

== See also ==
- Communes of the Aube department
