= La Loge-Pomblin =

Commune in Grand Est, France

- Commune
- Location of La Loge-Pomblin
- Location within France Location within Grand Est
- Coordinates: 48°03′17″N 4°02′07″E
- Country: France
- Region: Grand Est
- Department: Aube
- Arrondissement: Troyes
- Canton: Les Riceys

Government
  - Mayor (2022–2026): Jacky Gyé-Jacquot
- Area^{1}: 5.22 km^{2} (2.02 sq mi)
- Elevation: 139 m (456 ft)
- Population (2023): 53
  - Density: 10/km^{2} (26/sq mi)
- Time zone: UTC+01:00 (CET)
  - Summer (DST): UTC+02:00 (CEST)
- INSEE/Postal code: 10201 /10210
- ^{1} French Land Register data, which excludes lakes, ponds, glaciers > 1 km^{2} (0.386 sq mi or 247 acres) and river estuaries.

La Loge-Pomblin (French pronunciation: [la lɔʒ pɔ̃blɛ̃]) is a commune in the Aube department in north-central France.

== Population ==
Historical population
Year	Pop.	±% p.a.
1968	79	—
1975	63	−3.18%
1982	82	+3.84%
1990	68	−2.31%
1999	57	−1.94%
2007	68	+2.23%
2012	66	−0.60%
2017	68	+0.60%
2023	53	−4.07%
Source: INSEE

== See also ==
- Communes of the Aube department
- List of medieval bridges in France
