= Cormost =

Commune in Grand Est, France

- Commune
- Location of Cormost
- Location within France Location within Grand Est
- Coordinates: 48°10′12″N 4°08′15″E
- Country: France
- Region: Grand Est
- Department: Aube
- Arrondissement: Troyes
- Canton: Les Riceys
- Intercommunality: CA Troyes Champagne Métropole

Government
  - Mayor (2020–2026): Claude Gaurier
- Area^{1}: 11.36 km^{2} (4.39 sq mi)
- Elevation: 139 m (456 ft)
- Population (2023): 283
  - Density: 24.9/km^{2} (64.5/sq mi)
- Time zone: UTC+01:00 (CET)
  - Summer (DST): UTC+02:00 (CEST)
- INSEE/Postal code: 10104 /10800
- ^{1} French Land Register data, which excludes lakes, ponds, glaciers > 1 km^{2} (0.386 sq mi or 247 acres) and river estuaries.

Cormost is a commune in the Aube department in north-central France.

== Population ==
Historical population
Year	Pop.	±% p.a.
1968	120	—
1975	139	+2.12%
1982	275	+10.24%
1990	312	+1.59%
1999	262	−1.92%
2007	286	+1.10%
2012	305	+1.29%
2017	307	+0.13%
2023	283	−1.35%
Source: INSEE

== See also ==
- Communes of the Aube department
