= Jeugny =

Commune in Grand Est, France

- Commune
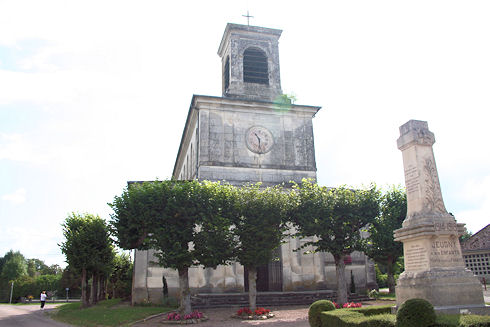
- The church in Jeugny
- Location of Jeugny
- Location within France Location within Grand Est
- Coordinates: 48°07′54″N 4°02′14″E
- Country: France
- Region: Grand Est
- Department: Aube
- Arrondissement: Troyes
- Canton: Les Riceys
- Intercommunality: CA Troyes Champagne Métropole

Government
  - Mayor (2020–2026): Marc Girard
- Area^{1}: 15.85 km^{2} (6.12 sq mi)
- Elevation: 150 m (490 ft)
- Highest elevation: 188 m (617 ft)
- Lowest elevation: 138 m (453 ft)
- Population (2023): 463
  - Density: 29.2/km^{2} (75.7/sq mi)
- Time zone: UTC+01:00 (CET)
  - Summer (DST): UTC+02:00 (CEST)
- INSEE/Postal code: 10179 /10320
- ^{1} French Land Register data, which excludes lakes, ponds, glaciers > 1 km^{2} (0.386 sq mi or 247 acres) and river estuaries.

Jeugny (French pronunciation: [ʒøɲi]) is a commune in the Aube department in north-central France.

== Population ==
Historical population
Year	Pop.	±% p.a.
1968	324	—
1975	261	−3.04%
1982	325	+3.18%
1990	368	+1.57%
1999	387	+0.56%
2007	449	+1.87%
2012	471	+0.96%
2017	490	+0.79%
2023	463	−0.94%
Source: INSEE

== See also ==
- Communes of the Aube department
