= Les Bordes-Aumont =

Commune in Grand Est, France

- Commune
- Coat of arms
- Location of Les Bordes-Aumont
- Location within France Location within Grand Est
- Coordinates: 48°11′11″N 4°07′21″E
- Country: France
- Region: Grand Est
- Department: Aube
- Arrondissement: Troyes
- Canton: Les Riceys
- Intercommunality: CA Troyes Champagne Métropole

Government
  - Mayor (2021–2026): Laurent Chatel
- Area^{1}: 5.49 km^{2} (2.12 sq mi)
- Elevation: 138 m (453 ft)
- Population (2023): 544
  - Density: 99.1/km^{2} (257/sq mi)
- Time zone: UTC+01:00 (CET)
  - Summer (DST): UTC+02:00 (CEST)
- INSEE/Postal code: 10049 /10800
- ^{1} French Land Register data, which excludes lakes, ponds, glaciers > 1 km^{2} (0.386 sq mi or 247 acres) and river estuaries.

Les Bordes-Aumont (French pronunciation: [le bɔʁd omɔ̃]) is a commune in the Aube department in north-central France.

== Population ==
Historical population
Year	Pop.	±% p.a.
1968	158	—
1975	164	+0.53%
1982	221	+4.35%
1990	288	+3.37%
1999	294	+0.23%
2007	377	+3.16%
2012	576	+8.85%
2017	543	−1.17%
2023	544	+0.03%
Source: INSEE

== See also ==
- Communes of the Aube department
