= Les Granges =

Commune in Grand Est, France

- Commune
- Location of Les Granges
- Location within France Location within Grand Est
- Coordinates: 48°03′32″N 4°03′15″E
- Country: France
- Region: Grand Est
- Department: Aube
- Arrondissement: Troyes
- Canton: Les Riceys

Government
  - Mayor (2020–2026): Bruno Vial
- Area^{1}: 1.61 km^{2} (0.62 sq mi)
- Elevation: 136 m (446 ft)
- Population (2023): 79
  - Density: 49/km^{2} (130/sq mi)
- Time zone: UTC+01:00 (CET)
  - Summer (DST): UTC+02:00 (CEST)
- INSEE/Postal code: 10168 /10210
- ^{1} French Land Register data, which excludes lakes, ponds, glaciers > 1 km^{2} (0.386 sq mi or 247 acres) and river estuaries.

Les Granges (French pronunciation: [le ɡʁɑ̃ʒ]) is a commune in the Aube department in north-central France.

== Population ==
Historical population
Year	Pop.	±% p.a.
1968	101	—
1975	83	−2.77%
1982	83	+0.00%
1990	71	−1.93%
1999	72	+0.16%
2007	78	+1.01%
2012	81	+0.76%
2017	75	−1.53%
2023	79	+0.87%
Source: INSEE

== See also ==
- Communes of the Aube department
