= Machy, Aube =

Commune in Grand Est, France

Machy
- Commune
- Location of Machy
- Location within France Location within Grand Est
- Coordinates: 48°08′25″N 4°02′55″E
- Country: France
- Region: Grand Est
- Department: Aube
- Arrondissement: Troyes
- Canton: Les Riceys
- Intercommunality: CA Troyes Champagne Métropole

Government
  - Mayor (2020–2026): Pauline Rousseau
- Area^{1}: 2.74 km^{2} (1.06 sq mi)
- Elevation: 160 m (520 ft)
- Population (2023): 108
  - Density: 39.4/km^{2} (102/sq mi)
- Time zone: UTC+01:00 (CET)
  - Summer (DST): UTC+02:00 (CEST)
- INSEE/Postal code: 10212 /10320
- ^{1} French Land Register data, which excludes lakes, ponds, glaciers > 1 km^{2} (0.386 sq mi or 247 acres) and river estuaries.

Machy (French pronunciation: [maʃi]) is a commune in the Aube department in north-central France.

== Population ==
Historical population
Year	Pop.	±% p.a.
1968	93	—
1975	76	−2.84%
1982	101	+4.15%
1990	127	+2.90%
1999	112	−1.39%
2007	102	−1.16%
2012	123	+3.82%
2017	115	−1.34%
2023	108	−1.04%
Source: INSEE

== See also ==
- Communes of the Aube department
