= Turgy =

Commune in Grand Est, France

- Commune
- Location of Turgy
- Location within France Location within Grand Est
- Coordinates: 48°01′29″N 4°02′36″E
- Country: France
- Region: Grand Est
- Department: Aube
- Arrondissement: Troyes
- Canton: Les Riceys

Government
  - Mayor (2020–2026): Pierre Poilvé
- Area^{1}: 9.97 km^{2} (3.85 sq mi)
- Elevation: 163 m (535 ft)
- Highest elevation: 187 m (614 ft)
- Lowest elevation: 133 m (436 ft)
- Population (2023): 43
  - Density: 4.3/km^{2} (11/sq mi)
- Time zone: UTC+01:00 (CET)
  - Summer (DST): UTC+02:00 (CEST)
- INSEE/Postal code: 10388 /10210
- ^{1} French Land Register data, which excludes lakes, ponds, glaciers > 1 km^{2} (0.386 sq mi or 247 acres) and river estuaries.

Turgy (French pronunciation: [tyʁʒi]) is a commune in the Aube department in north-central France.

== Population ==
Historical population
Year	Pop.	±% p.a.
1968	61	—
1975	52	−2.25%
1982	46	−1.74%
1990	32	−4.43%
1999	40	+2.51%
2007	38	−0.64%
2012	46	+3.90%
2017	45	−0.44%
2023	43	−0.75%
Source: INSEE

== See also ==
- Communes of the Aube department
