= Javernant =

Commune in Grand Est, France

- Commune
- Coat of arms
- Location of Javernant
- Location within France Location within Grand Est
- Coordinates: 48°09′44″N 4°00′11″E
- Country: France
- Region: Grand Est
- Department: Aube
- Arrondissement: Troyes
- Canton: Les Riceys
- Intercommunality: CA Troyes Champagne Métropole

Government
  - Mayor (2020–2026): Jean-Jacques Montagne
- Area^{1}: 5.62 km^{2} (2.17 sq mi)
- Elevation: 203 m (666 ft)
- Population (2023): 165
  - Density: 29.4/km^{2} (76.0/sq mi)
- Time zone: UTC+01:00 (CET)
  - Summer (DST): UTC+02:00 (CEST)
- INSEE/Postal code: 10177 /10320
- ^{1} French Land Register data, which excludes lakes, ponds, glaciers > 1 km^{2} (0.386 sq mi or 247 acres) and river estuaries.

Javernant (French pronunciation: [ʒavɛʁnɑ̃]) is a commune in the Aube department in north-central France.

== Population ==
Historical population
| Year | Pop. | ±% p.a. |
|---|---|---|
| 1968 | 69 | — |
| 1975 | 76 | +1.39% |
| 1982 | 109 | +5.29% |
| 1990 | 121 | +1.31% |
| 1999 | 113 | −0.76% |
| 2007 | 153 | +3.86% |
| 2012 | 158 | +0.65% |
| 2017 | 150 | −1.03% |
| 2023 | 165 | +1.60% |
Source: INSEE

== See also ==
- Communes of the Aube department
