= Coussegrey =

Commune in Grand Est, France

- Commune
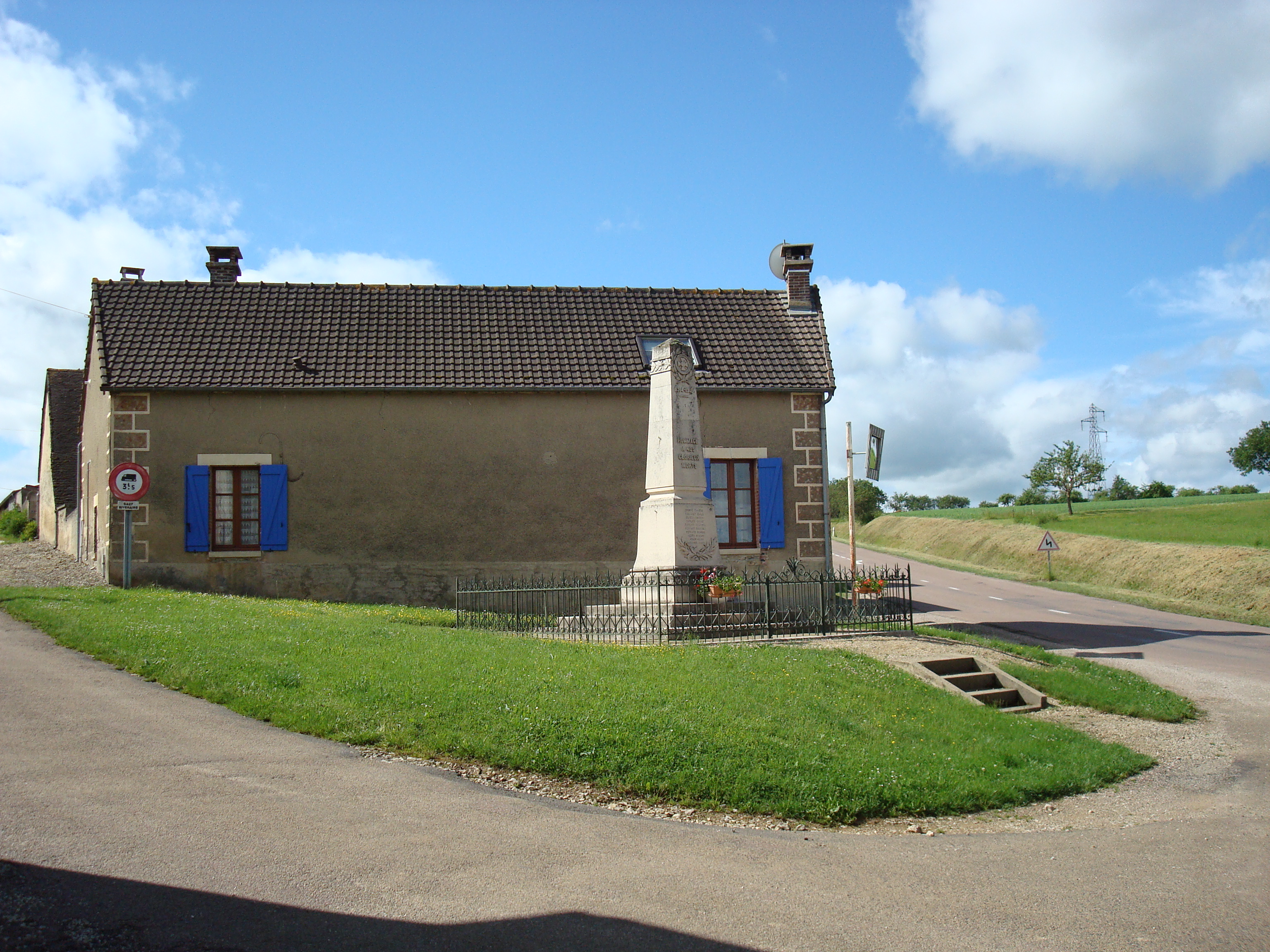
- War memorial
- Location of Coussegrey
- Location within France Location within Grand Est
- Coordinates: 47°57′20″N 4°01′05″E
- Country: France
- Region: Grand Est
- Department: Aube
- Arrondissement: Troyes
- Canton: Les Riceys
- Intercommunality: CC du Chaourçois et du Val d'Armance

Government
  - Mayor (2020–2026): Dominique Foutrier
- Area^{1}: 16.16 km^{2} (6.24 sq mi)
- Elevation: 190 m (620 ft)
- Population (2023): 180
  - Density: 11/km^{2} (29/sq mi)
- Time zone: UTC+01:00 (CET)
  - Summer (DST): UTC+02:00 (CEST)
- INSEE/Postal code: 10112 /10210
- ^{1} French Land Register data, which excludes lakes, ponds, glaciers > 1 km^{2} (0.386 sq mi or 247 acres) and river estuaries.

Coussegrey (French pronunciation: [kusɡʁɛ]) is a commune in the Aube department in north-central France.

== Population ==
Historical population
Year	Pop.	±% p.a.
1968	228	—
1975	203	−1.65%
1982	194	−0.65%
1990	189	−0.33%
1999	195	+0.35%
2007	169	−1.77%
2012	169	+0.00%
2017	190	+2.37%
2023	180	−0.90%
Source: INSEE

== See also ==
- Communes of the Aube department
