= La Vendue-Mignot =

Commune in Grand Est, France

- Commune
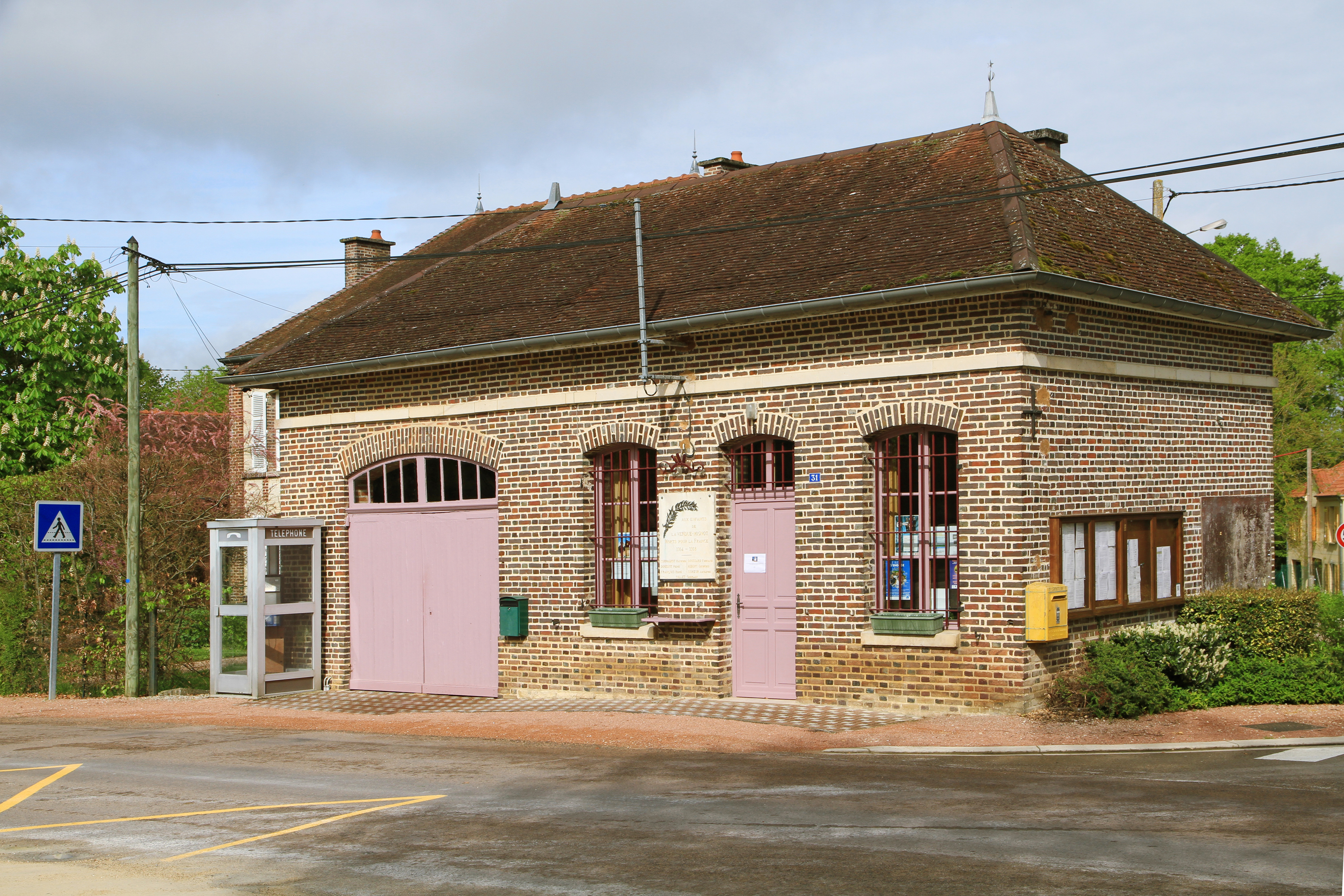
- The town hall in La Vendue-Mignot
- Location of La Vendue-Mignot
- Location within France Location within Grand Est
- Coordinates: 48°09′49″N 4°06′41″E
- Country: France
- Region: Grand Est
- Department: Aube
- Arrondissement: Troyes
- Canton: Les Riceys
- Intercommunality: CA Troyes Champagne Métropole

Government
  - Mayor (2020–2026): Nicole Rousselot
- Area^{1}: 10.48 km^{2} (4.05 sq mi)
- Elevation: 137 m (449 ft)
- Population (2023): 241
  - Density: 23.0/km^{2} (59.6/sq mi)
- Time zone: UTC+01:00 (CET)
  - Summer (DST): UTC+02:00 (CEST)
- INSEE/Postal code: 10402 /10800
- ^{1} French Land Register data, which excludes lakes, ponds, glaciers > 1 km^{2} (0.386 sq mi or 247 acres) and river estuaries.

La Vendue-Mignot (French pronunciation: [la vɑ̃dy miɲo]) is a commune in the Aube department in north-central France.

== Population ==
Historical population
Year	Pop.	±% p.a.
1968	125	—
1975	129	+0.45%
1982	183	+5.12%
1990	243	+3.61%
1999	246	+0.14%
2007	234	−0.62%
2012	241	+0.59%
2017	250	+0.74%
2023	241	−0.61%
Source: INSEE

== See also ==
- Communes of the Aube department
