= Canton of Les Riceys =

Coordinates: 47°59′38″N 4°22′10″E

- Canton
- Situation of the canton of Les Riceys in the department of Aube
- Country: France
- Region: Grand Est
- Department: Aube
- No. of communes: {{{nbcomm}}}
- Population (2023): 14,262
- INSEE code: 1008

The canton of Les Riceys is one of the 17 cantons of the Aube department, in northern France. Since the French canton reorganisation which came into effect in March 2015, the communes of the canton of Les Riceys are:

1. Arrelles
2. Assenay
3. Avirey-Lingey
4. Avreuil
5. Bagneux-la-Fosse
6. Balnot-la-Grange
7. Balnot-sur-Laignes
8. Bernon
9. Les Bordes-Aumont
10. Bouilly
11. Bragelogne-Beauvoir
12. Channes
13. Chaource
14. Chaserey
15. Chesley
16. Cormost
17. Coussegrey
18. Crésantignes
19. Cussangy
20. Étourvy
21. Fays-la-Chapelle
22. Les Granges
23. Javernant
24. Jeugny
25. Lagesse
26. Laines-aux-Bois
27. Lantages
28. Lignières
29. Lirey
30. La Loge-Pomblin
31. Les Loges-Margueron
32. Longeville-sur-Mogne
33. Machy
34. Maisons-lès-Chaource
35. Maupas
36. Metz-Robert
37. Montceaux-lès-Vaudes
38. Pargues
39. Praslin
40. Prusy
41. Les Riceys
42. Roncenay
43. Saint-Jean-de-Bonneval
44. Saint-Pouange
45. Sommeval
46. Souligny
47. Turgy
48. Vallières
49. Vanlay
50. La Vendue-Mignot
51. Villemereuil
52. Villery
53. Villiers-le-Bois
54. Villiers-sous-Praslin
55. Villy-le-Bois
56. Villy-le-Maréchal
57. Vougrey
