= Roncenay =

Commune in Grand Est, France

- Commune
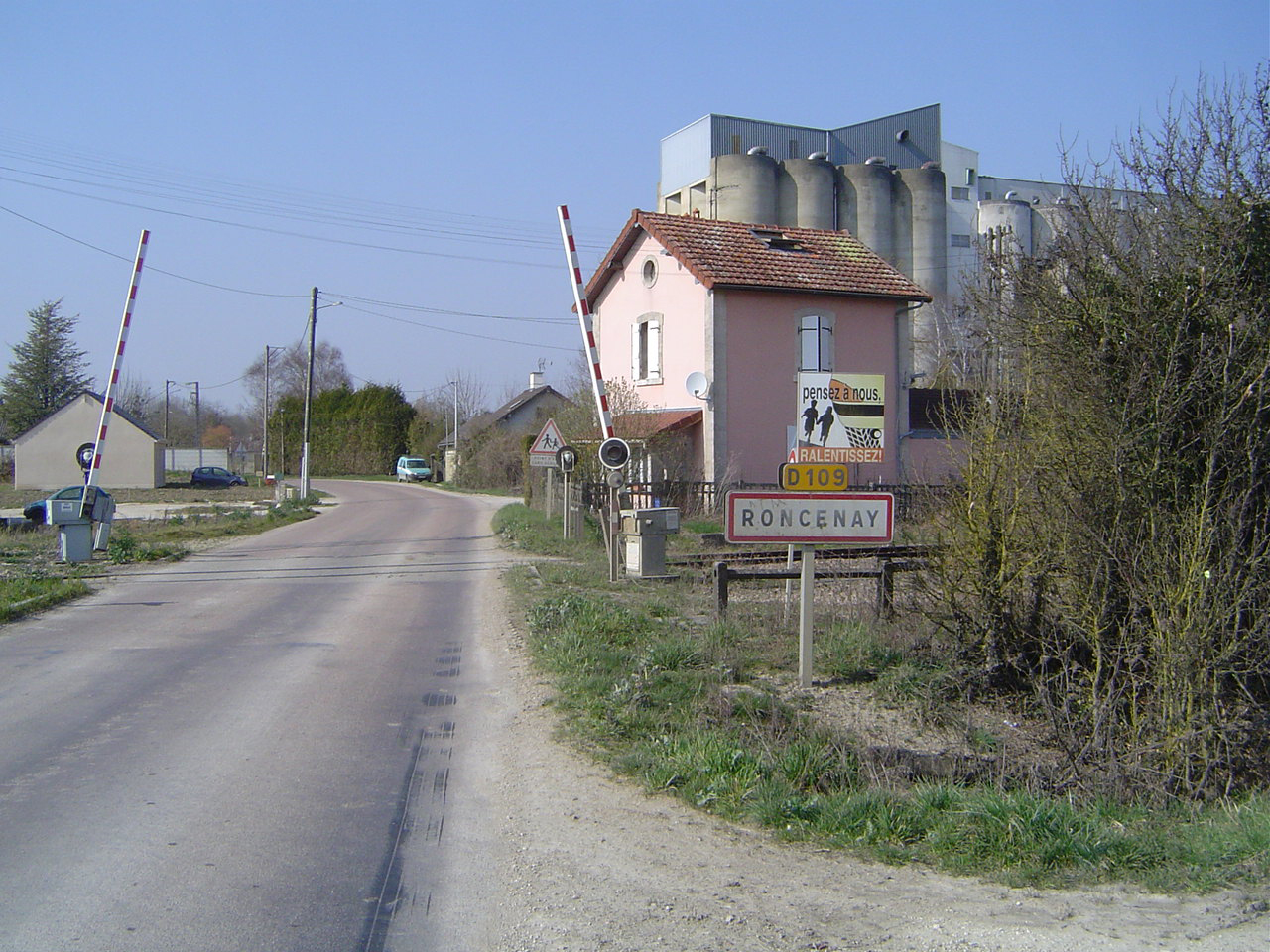
- The road into Roncenay
- Location of Roncenay
- Location within France Location within Grand Est
- Coordinates: 48°12′01″N 4°03′06″E
- Country: France
- Region: Grand Est
- Department: Aube
- Arrondissement: Troyes
- Canton: Les Riceys
- Intercommunality: CA Troyes Champagne Métropole

Government
  - Mayor (2020–2026): Patrick Finot
- Area^{1}: 3.82 km^{2} (1.47 sq mi)
- Elevation: 128 m (420 ft)
- Population (2023): 175
  - Density: 45.8/km^{2} (119/sq mi)
- Time zone: UTC+01:00 (CET)
  - Summer (DST): UTC+02:00 (CEST)
- INSEE/Postal code: 10324 /10320
- ^{1} French Land Register data, which excludes lakes, ponds, glaciers > 1 km^{2} (0.386 sq mi or 247 acres) and river estuaries.

Roncenay (French pronunciation: [ʁɔ̃snɛ]) is a commune in the Aube department in north-central France.

== Population ==
Historical population
Year	Pop.	±% p.a.
1968	75	—
1975	102	+4.49%
1982	121	+2.47%
1990	165	+3.95%
1999	134	−2.29%
2007	133	−0.09%
2012	142	+1.32%
2017	159	+2.29%
2023	175	+1.61%
Source: INSEE

== See also ==
- Communes of the Aube department
