= Lagesse =

Commune in Grand Est, France

- Commune
- Location of Lagesse
- Location within France Location within Grand Est
- Coordinates: 48°01′20″N 4°08′04″E
- Country: France
- Region: Grand Est
- Department: Aube
- Arrondissement: Troyes
- Canton: Les Riceys

Government
  - Mayor (2020–2026): Jean-Michel Hupfer
- Area^{1}: 12.57 km^{2} (4.85 sq mi)
- Elevation: 226 m (741 ft)
- Population (2023): 209
  - Density: 16.6/km^{2} (43.1/sq mi)
- Time zone: UTC+01:00 (CET)
  - Summer (DST): UTC+02:00 (CEST)
- INSEE/Postal code: 10185 /10210
- ^{1} French Land Register data, which excludes lakes, ponds, glaciers > 1 km^{2} (0.386 sq mi or 247 acres) and river estuaries.

Lagesse (French pronunciation: [laʒɛs]) is a commune in the Aube department in north-central France.

== Population ==
Historical population
Year	Pop.	±% p.a.
1968	205	—
1975	200	−0.35%
1982	207	+0.49%
1990	179	−1.80%
1999	168	−0.70%
2007	187	+1.35%
2012	193	+0.63%
2017	205	+1.21%
2023	209	+0.32%
Source: INSEE

== See also ==
- Communes of the Aube department
