= Channes =

Commune in Grand Est, France

- Commune
- Coat of arms
- Location of Channes
- Location within France Location within Grand Est
- Coordinates: 47°56′29″N 4°15′20″E
- Country: France
- Region: Grand Est
- Department: Aube
- Arrondissement: Troyes
- Canton: Les Riceys

Government
  - Mayor (2020–2026): Annie Morel
- Area^{1}: 14.26 km^{2} (5.51 sq mi)
- Elevation: 308 m (1,010 ft)
- Population (2023): 108
  - Density: 7.57/km^{2} (19.6/sq mi)
- Time zone: UTC+01:00 (CET)
  - Summer (DST): UTC+02:00 (CEST)
- INSEE/Postal code: 10079 /10340
- ^{1} French Land Register data, which excludes lakes, ponds, glaciers > 1 km^{2} (0.386 sq mi or 247 acres) and river estuaries.

Channes (French pronunciation: [ʃan]) is a commune in the Aube department in north-central France.

== History ==
- Channes is mentioned in 1151 as Chaunnes in a charter of Quincy Abbey, then in 1219 as Cheonnaium in a cartulary of Molesme Abbey, and in 1381 as Chaonnes (fealty and homage rendered by several lords; the current name "Channes" appears from the 17th century).

A bailiff appointed by Molesme Abbey administered justice in the 17th and 18th centuries.

"On December 26, 1790, Calmelet, parish priest of Channes, blessed an iron cross at the edge of the village, on the road to Riceys... The entire parish was in procession, and the ceremony was conducted with all the solemnity required on such occasions and with great piety and reverence..."

== Local culture and heritage ==
=== Places and monuments ===
- Church of the Nativity of the Virgin Mary in Channes.
- The Saint Anne Fountain in Channes: Before following the Sarce River, clever children can take the opportunity to visit Channes and drink the water from the Saint Anne Fountain, which is said to prevent contagious diseases.

== Heraldry ==
| Arms of Channes | Party: 1st Or, an oak tree vert trunked tenné, 2nd Gules, a fleur-de-lis argent, stamens or; all on a chief azure a bend argent cotised by two gold bars potent counter-potent inwardly. Town Hall document, 2025. Author: Jean-François Binon |

== Population ==
Historical population
| Year | Pop. | ±% p.a. |
|---|---|---|
| 1968 | 180 | — |
| 1975 | 178 | −0.16% |
| 1982 | 166 | −0.99% |
| 1990 | 148 | −1.42% |
| 1999 | 143 | −0.38% |
| 2007 | 128 | −1.38% |
| 2012 | 118 | −1.61% |
| 2017 | 123 | +0.83% |
| 2023 | 108 | −2.14% |
Source: INSEE

== See also ==
- Communes of the Aube department
