= Bernon =

Commune in Grand Est, France

- Commune
- Coat of arms
- Location of Bernon
- Location within France Location within Grand Est
- Coordinates: 47°59′21″N 3°59′46″E
- Country: France
- Region: Grand Est
- Department: Aube
- Arrondissement: Troyes
- Canton: Les Riceys
- Intercommunality: CC du Chaourçois et du Val d'Armance

Government
  - Mayor (2020–2026): Christian Langard
- Area^{1}: 17.91 km^{2} (6.92 sq mi)
- Elevation: 176 m (577 ft)
- Highest elevation: 221 m (725 ft)
- Lowest elevation: 134 m (440 ft)
- Population (2023): 160
  - Density: 8.9/km^{2} (23/sq mi)
- Time zone: UTC+01:00 (CET)
  - Summer (DST): UTC+02:00 (CEST)
- INSEE/Postal code: 10040 /10130
- ^{1} French Land Register data, which excludes lakes, ponds, glaciers > 1 km^{2} (0.386 sq mi or 247 acres) and river estuaries.

Bernon (French pronunciation: [bɛʁnɔ̃]) is a commune in the Aube department in north-central France.

== Population ==
Historical population
Year	Pop.	±% p.a.
1968	287	—
1975	237	−2.70%
1982	208	−1.85%
1990	178	−1.93%
1999	196	+1.08%
2007	201	+0.32%
2012	190	−1.12%
2017	164	−2.90%
2023	160	−0.41%
Source: INSEE

== See also ==
- Communes of the Aube department
