= Sommeval =

Commune in Grand Est, France

- Commune
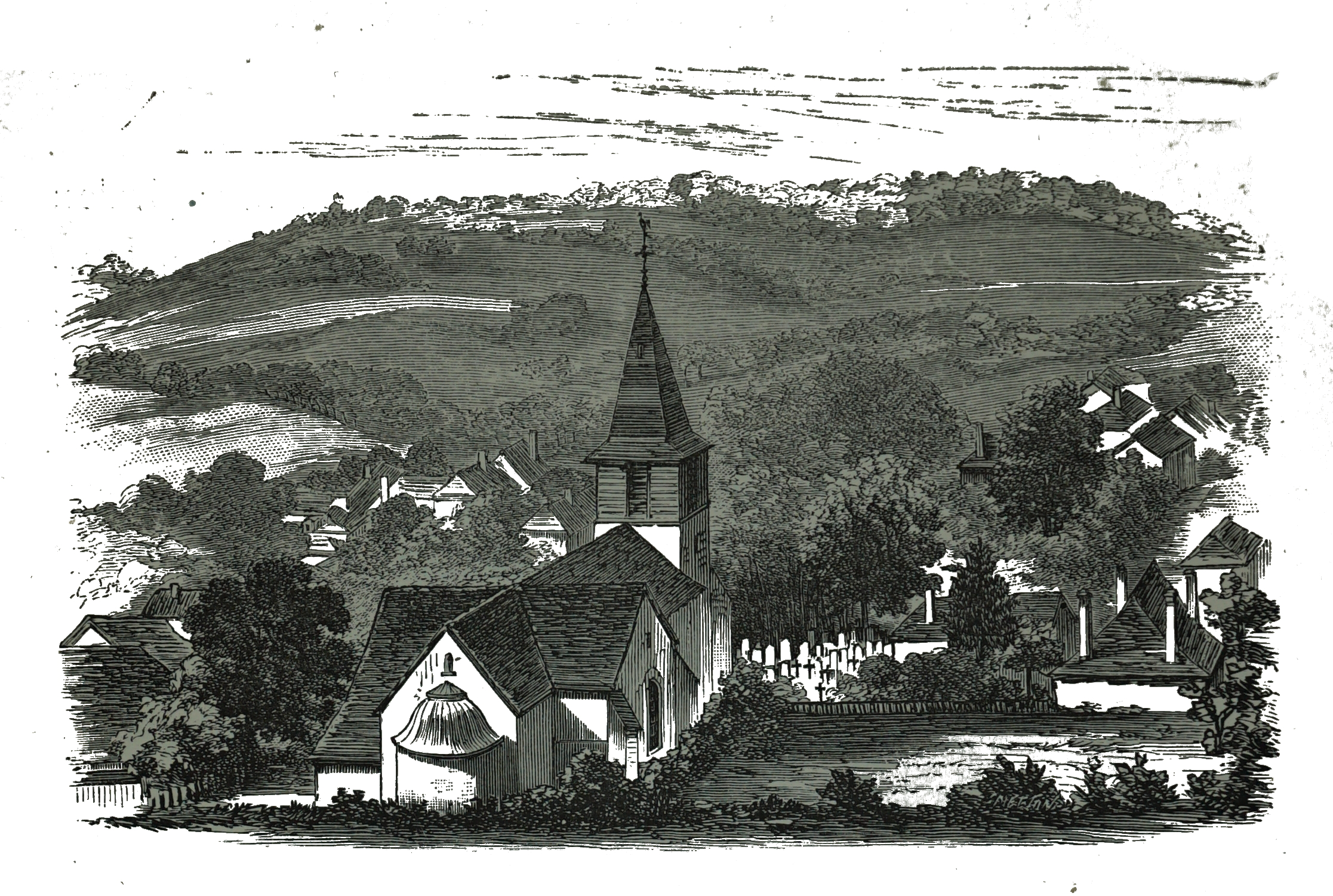
- A drawing of the village by Fichot

- Coat of arms
- Location of Sommeval
- Location within France Location within Grand Est
- Coordinates: 48°09′59″N 3°57′58″E
- Country: France
- Region: Grand Est
- Department: Aube
- Arrondissement: Troyes
- Canton: Les Riceys
- Intercommunality: CA Troyes Champagne Métropole

Government
  - Mayor (2020–2026): André Billet
- Area^{1}: 9.57 km^{2} (3.69 sq mi)
- Elevation: 210 m (690 ft)
- Highest elevation: 298 m (978 ft)
- Lowest elevation: 175 m (574 ft)
- Population (2023): 298
  - Density: 31.1/km^{2} (80.6/sq mi)
- Time zone: UTC+01:00 (CET)
  - Summer (DST): UTC+02:00 (CEST)
- INSEE/Postal code: 10371 /10320
- ^{1} French Land Register data, which excludes lakes, ponds, glaciers > 1 km^{2} (0.386 sq mi or 247 acres) and river estuaries.

Sommeval (French pronunciation: [sɔmval]) is a commune in the Aube department in north-central France.

== Population ==
Historical population
Year	Pop.	±% p.a.
1968	144	—
1975	163	+1.79%
1982	235	+5.37%
1990	235	+0.00%
1999	278	+1.88%
2007	325	+1.97%
2012	332	+0.43%
2017	311	−1.30%
2023	298	−0.71%
Source: INSEE

== See also ==
- Communes of the Aube department
