= Lantages =

Commune in Grand Est, France

- Commune
- Location of Lantages
- Location within France Location within Grand Est
- Coordinates: 48°04′24″N 4°12′39″E
- Country: France
- Region: Grand Est
- Department: Aube
- Arrondissement: Troyes
- Canton: Les Riceys

Government
  - Mayor (2020–2026): Didier Henaut
- Area^{1}: 18.87 km^{2} (7.29 sq mi)
- Elevation: 168 m (551 ft)
- Population (2023): 221
  - Density: 11.7/km^{2} (30.3/sq mi)
- Time zone: UTC+01:00 (CET)
  - Summer (DST): UTC+02:00 (CEST)
- INSEE/Postal code: 10188 /10210
- ^{1} French Land Register data, which excludes lakes, ponds, glaciers > 1 km^{2} (0.386 sq mi or 247 acres) and river estuaries.

Lantages (French pronunciation: [lɑ̃taʒ]) is a commune in the Aube department in north-central France.

== Population ==
Historical population
Year	Pop.	±% p.a.
1968	174	—
1975	171	−0.25%
1982	166	−0.42%
1990	204	+2.61%
1999	216	+0.64%
2007	241	+1.38%
2012	252	+0.90%
2017	230	−1.81%
2023	221	−0.66%
Source: INSEE

== See also ==
- Communes of the Aube department
