= Crésantignes =

Commune in Grand Est, France

- Commune
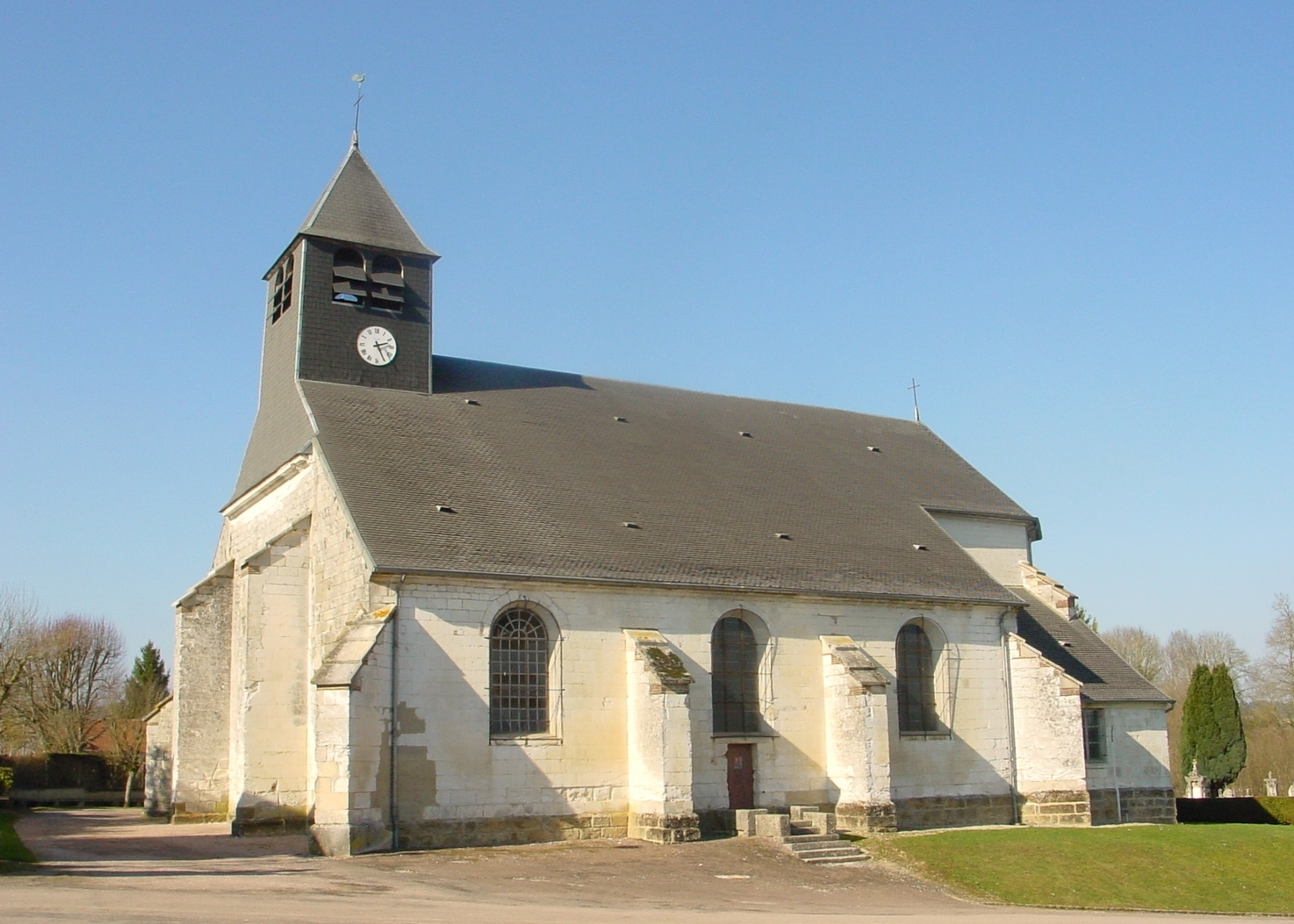
- The church in Crésantignes

- Coat of arms
- Location of Crésantignes
- Location within France Location within Grand Est
- Coordinates: 48°08′30″N 4°01′12″E
- Country: France
- Region: Grand Est
- Department: Aube
- Arrondissement: Troyes
- Canton: Les Riceys
- Intercommunality: CA Troyes Champagne Métropole

Government
  - Mayor (2020–2026): Dominique Blanchard
- Area^{1}: 2.1 km^{2} (0.81 sq mi)
- Elevation: 184 m (604 ft)
- Population (2023): 307
  - Density: 150/km^{2} (380/sq mi)
- Time zone: UTC+01:00 (CET)
  - Summer (DST): UTC+02:00 (CEST)
- INSEE/Postal code: 10116 /10320
- ^{1} French Land Register data, which excludes lakes, ponds, glaciers > 1 km^{2} (0.386 sq mi or 247 acres) and river estuaries.

Crésantignes (French pronunciation: [kʁezɑ̃tiɲ]) is a commune in the Aube department in north-central France.

== Population ==
Historical population
Year	Pop.	±% p.a.
1968	208	—
1975	202	−0.42%
1982	256	+3.44%
1990	277	+0.99%
1999	269	−0.33%
2007	277	+0.37%
2012	309	+2.21%
2017	312	+0.19%
2023	307	−0.27%
Source: INSEE

== See also ==
- Communes of the Aube department
