= Prusy, Aube =

Commune in Grand Est, France

Prusy
- Commune
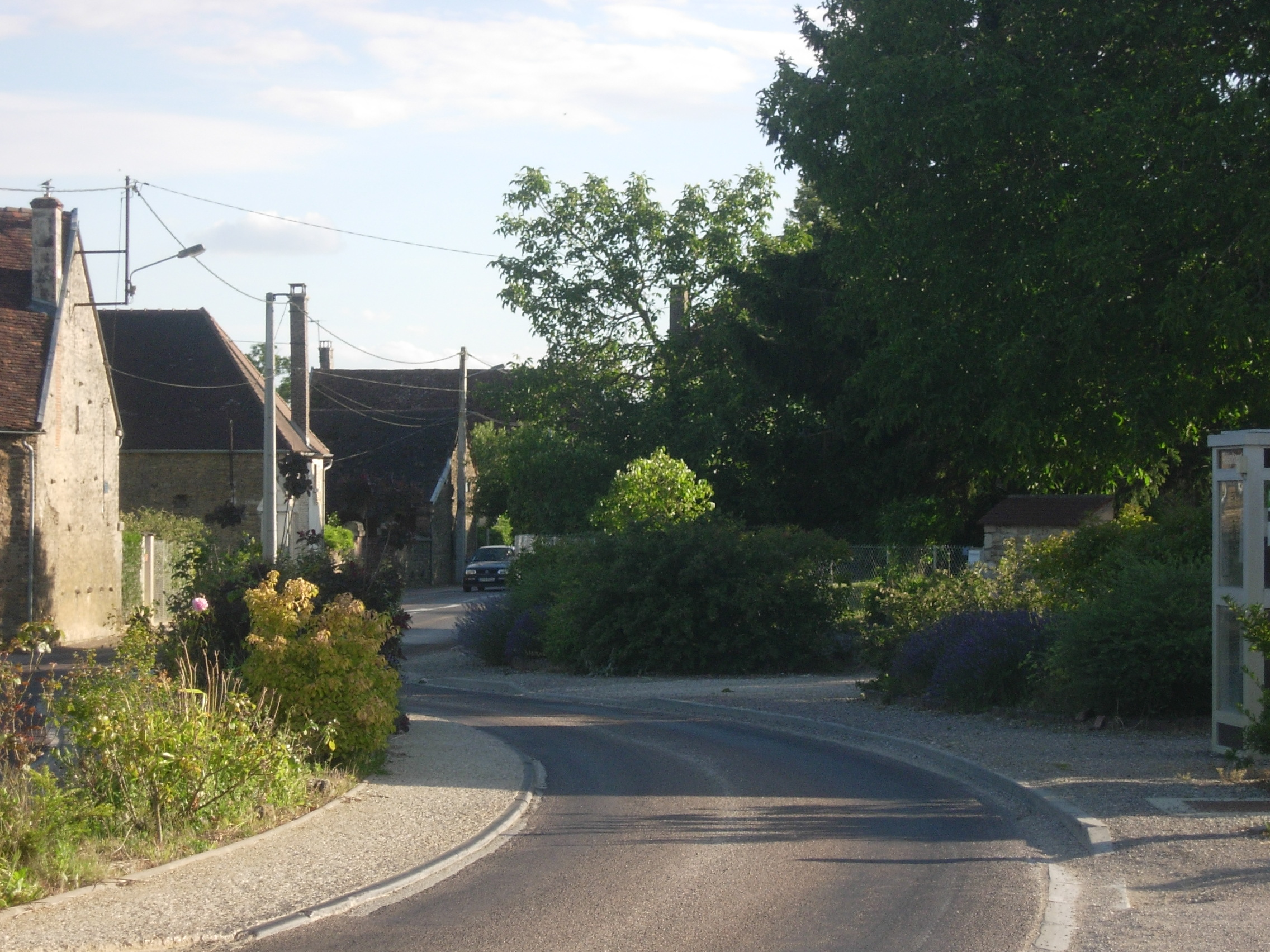
- A general view of Prusy
- Location of Prusy
- Location within France Location within Grand Est
- Coordinates: 47°58′20″N 4°02′44″E
- Country: France
- Region: Grand Est
- Department: Aube
- Arrondissement: Troyes
- Canton: Les Riceys

Government
  - Mayor (2020–2026): Jean-Louis Millard
- Area^{1}: 3.95 km^{2} (1.53 sq mi)
- Elevation: 288 m (945 ft)
- Population (2023): 84
  - Density: 21/km^{2} (55/sq mi)
- Time zone: UTC+01:00 (CET)
  - Summer (DST): UTC+02:00 (CEST)
- INSEE/Postal code: 10309 /10210
- ^{1} French Land Register data, which excludes lakes, ponds, glaciers > 1 km^{2} (0.386 sq mi or 247 acres) and river estuaries.

Prusy (French pronunciation: [pʁyzi]) is a commune in the Aube department in north-central France.

== Population ==
Historical population
Year	Pop.	±% p.a.
1968	110	—
1975	101	−1.21%
1982	101	+0.00%
1990	102	+0.12%
1999	109	+0.74%
2007	106	−0.35%
2012	102	−0.77%
2017	94	−1.62%
2023	84	−1.86%
Source: INSEE

== See also ==
- Communes of the Aube department
