= Metz-Robert =

Commune in Grand Est, France

- Commune
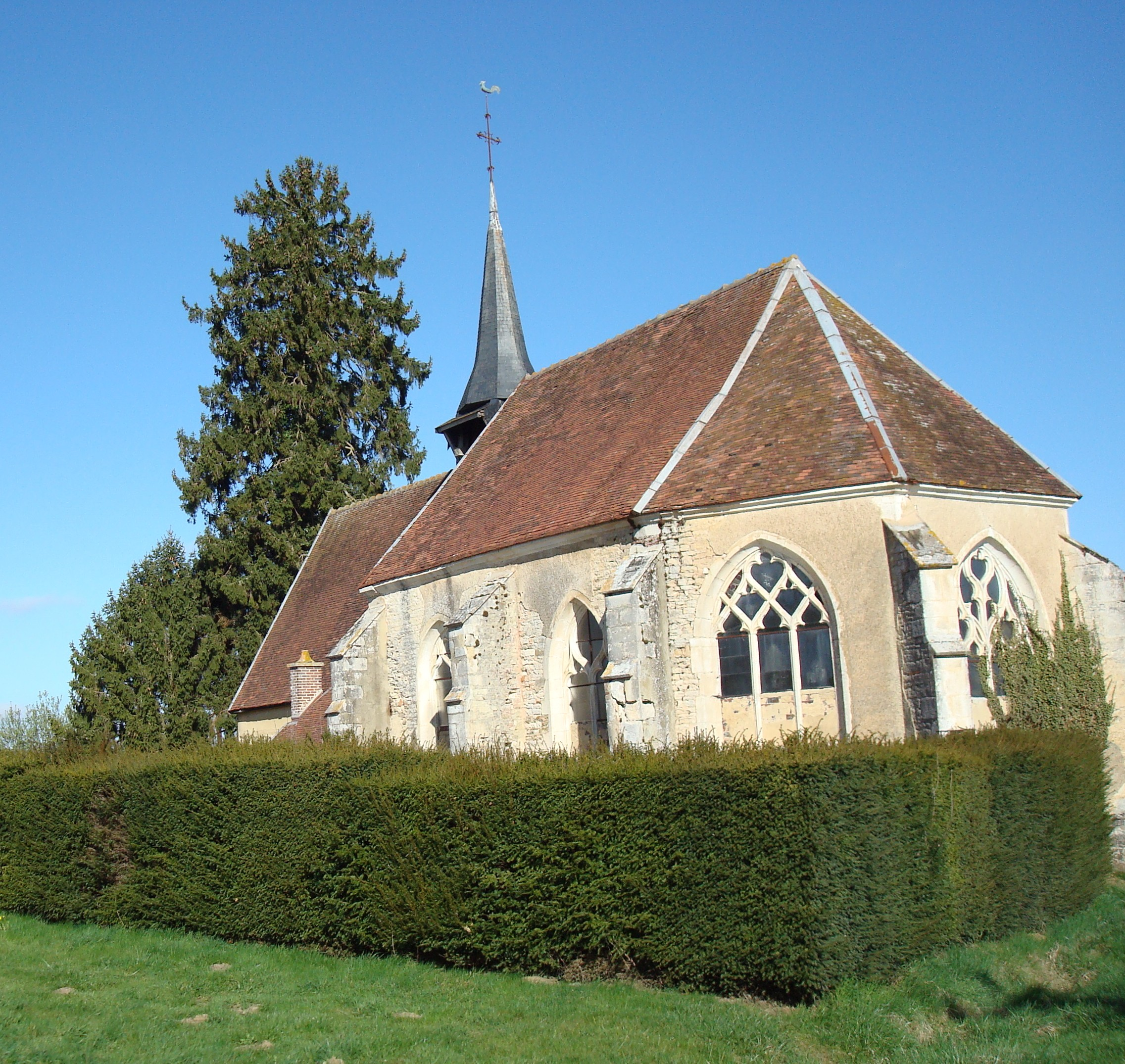
- The church in Metz-Robert
- Location of Metz-Robert
- Location within France Location within Grand Est
- Coordinates: 48°04′38″N 4°06′37″E
- Country: France
- Region: Grand Est
- Department: Aube
- Arrondissement: Troyes
- Canton: Les Riceys

Government
  - Mayor (2020–2026): Daniel Coutord
- Area^{1}: 4.26 km^{2} (1.64 sq mi)
- Elevation: 151 m (495 ft)
- Population (2023): 54
  - Density: 13/km^{2} (33/sq mi)
- Time zone: UTC+01:00 (CET)
  - Summer (DST): UTC+02:00 (CEST)
- INSEE/Postal code: 10241 /10210
- ^{1} French Land Register data, which excludes lakes, ponds, glaciers > 1 km^{2} (0.386 sq mi or 247 acres) and river estuaries.

Metz-Robert is a commune in the Aube department in north-central France.

== Administration ==
List of mayors

From	To	Name	Party	Position
4 March 1793		Edme Grange		
6 November 1795		Claude Castillon		
after November 1795	before June 1800	Jean-Baptiste Haillot		
17 June 1800		Jean Castillon		
22 March 1808		Jean Heriot		
10 April 1812		Jean-Baptiste Duschastel		
29 October 1815		Jean Heriot		
21 June 1821		Edme Bellot		
18 April 1825		Charles Caffet		
27 March 1835		Pierre Sauvageot		
19 May 1867		François Menneret		
29 December 1870		Claude Castillon		
25 May 1871		Léon Prunier		
1 January 1879		François Menneret		
3 October 1888		Prosper Félix Haillot		
18 October 1891		Armand Menneret		
13 May 1900		Léon dit Ernest Mathieu		
8 August 1904		Prosper Félix Haillot		
22 March 1939	13 May 1945	Gabriel Beauchet		
13 May 1945	15 March 1959	Suzanne Chenut née Haillot		
15 March 1959	21 March 1965	Roger Bernard		
21 March 1965	12 July 1979	Bernard Coutord		
12 July 1979	6 August 1980	Raymond Artus		
6 August 1980	13 March 1983	Andrée Pradet née Beauchet		
13 March 1983	15 March 2026	Daniel Coutord		
15 March 2026	Incumbent	Jean-Marc Adenin		

== Population ==
Historical population
Year	Pop.	±% p.a.
1968	42	—
1975	37	−1.79%
1982	49	+4.09%
1990	47	−0.52%
1999	51	+0.91%
2007	56	+1.18%
2012	51	−1.85%
2017	61	+3.65%
2023	54	−2.01%
Source: INSEE

== See also ==
- Communes of the Aube department
