= Longeville-sur-Mogne =

Commune in Grand Est, France

- Commune
- Location of Longeville-sur-Mogne
- Location within France Location within Grand Est
- Coordinates: 48°08′59″N 4°03′40″E
- Country: France
- Region: Grand Est
- Department: Aube
- Arrondissement: Troyes
- Canton: Les Riceys
- Intercommunality: CA Troyes Champagne Métropole

Government
  - Mayor (2020–2026): Anicet Champagne
- Area^{1}: 4.15 km^{2} (1.60 sq mi)
- Elevation: 130 m (430 ft)
- Population (2023): 137
  - Density: 33.0/km^{2} (85.5/sq mi)
- Time zone: UTC+01:00 (CET)
  - Summer (DST): UTC+02:00 (CEST)
- INSEE/Postal code: 10204 /10320
- ^{1} French Land Register data, which excludes lakes, ponds, glaciers > 1 km^{2} (0.386 sq mi or 247 acres) and river estuaries.

Longeville-sur-Mogne (French pronunciation: [lɔ̃ʒvil syʁ mɔɲ]) is a commune in the Aube department in north-central France.

== Population ==
Historical population
Year	Pop.	±% p.a.
1968	42	—
1975	67	+6.90%
1982	87	+3.80%
1990	106	+2.50%
1999	94	−1.33%
2007	107	+1.63%
2012	114	+1.28%
2017	158	+6.75%
2023	137	−2.35%
Source: INSEE

== See also ==
- Communes of the Aube department
