= Lignières, Aube =

Commune in Grand Est, France

Lignières
- Commune
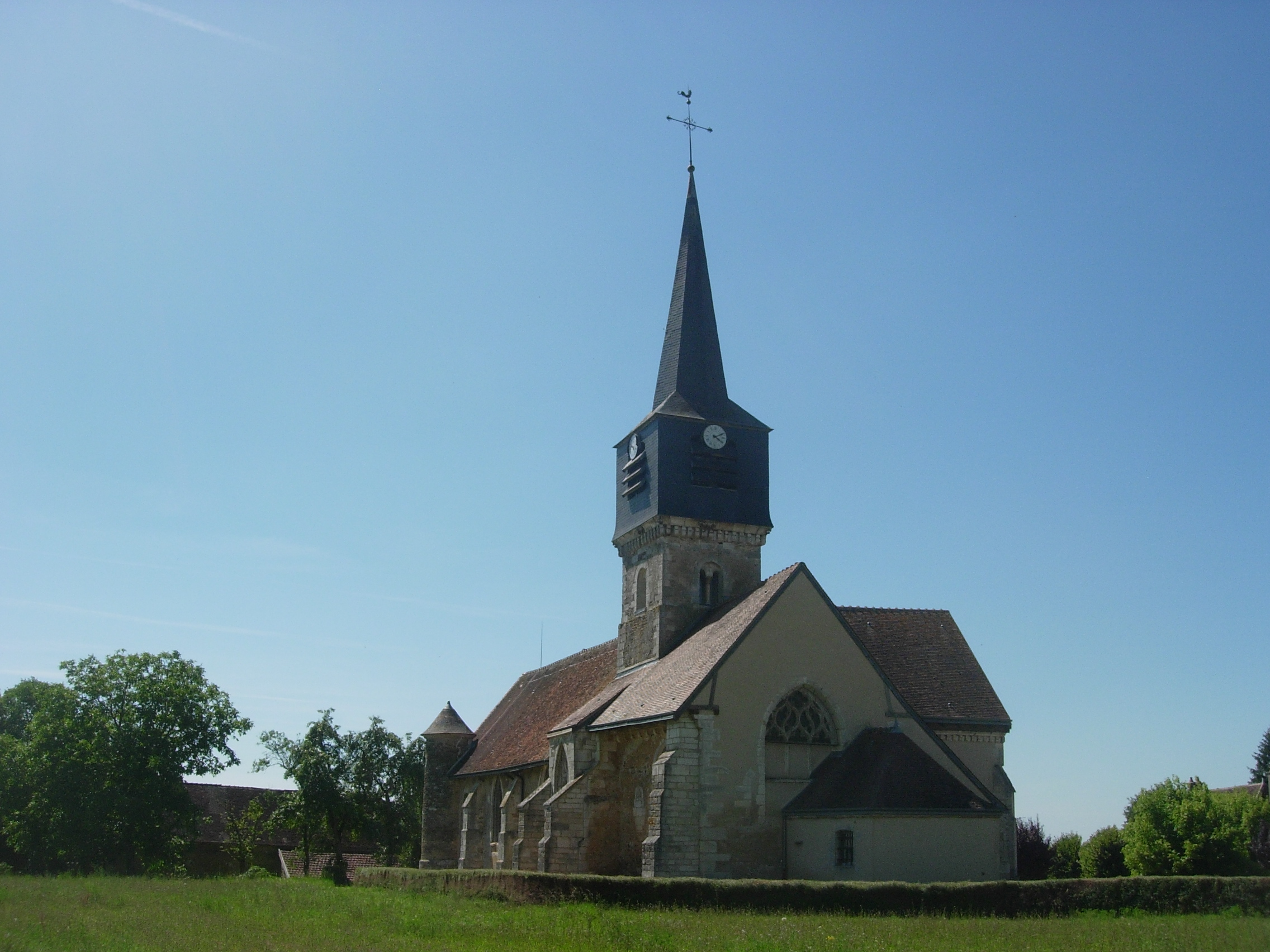
- The church in Lignières

- Coat of arms
- Location of Lignières
- Location within France Location within Grand Est
- Coordinates: 47°57′10″N 3°58′02″E
- Country: France
- Region: Grand Est
- Department: Aube
- Arrondissement: Troyes
- Canton: Les Riceys
- Intercommunality: Chaourçois et Val d'Armance

Government
  - Mayor (2023–2026): Régis Devillaine
- Area^{1}: 25.79 km^{2} (9.96 sq mi)
- Elevation: 224 m (735 ft)
- Population (2023): 223
  - Density: 8.65/km^{2} (22.4/sq mi)
- Demonym(s): Daubiers, Daubières
- Time zone: UTC+01:00 (CET)
  - Summer (DST): UTC+02:00 (CEST)
- INSEE/Postal code: 10196 /10130
- ^{1} French Land Register data, which excludes lakes, ponds, glaciers > 1 km^{2} (0.386 sq mi or 247 acres) and river estuaries.

Lignières (French pronunciation: [liɲjɛʁ]) is a commune in the Aube department in north-central France.

== Population ==
Historical population
Year	Pop.	±% p.a.
1968	307	—
1975	276	−1.51%
1982	259	−0.90%
1990	230	−1.47%
1999	248	+0.84%
2007	227	−1.10%
2012	239	+1.04%
2017	212	−2.37%
2023	223	+0.85%
Source: INSEE

== See also ==
- Communes of the Aube department
