= Fays-la-Chapelle =

Commune in Grand Est, France

- Commune
- Location of Fays-la-Chapelle
- Location within France Location within Grand Est
- Coordinates: 48°07′51″N 4°01′14″E
- Country: France
- Region: Grand Est
- Department: Aube
- Arrondissement: Troyes
- Canton: Les Riceys
- Intercommunality: CA Troyes Champagne Métropole

Government
  - Mayor (2020–2026): Gilles Renoir
- Area^{1}: 0.5 km^{2} (0.19 sq mi)
- Elevation: 160 m (520 ft)
- Population (2023): 119
  - Density: 240/km^{2} (620/sq mi)
- Time zone: UTC+01:00 (CET)
  - Summer (DST): UTC+02:00 (CEST)
- INSEE/Postal code: 10147 /10320
- ^{1} French Land Register data, which excludes lakes, ponds, glaciers > 1 km^{2} (0.386 sq mi or 247 acres) and river estuaries.

Fays-la-Chapelle (French pronunciation: [fɛ la ʃapɛl]) is a commune in the Aube department in north-central France.

== Population ==
Historical population
| Year | Pop. | ±% p.a. |
|---|---|---|
| 1968 | 173 | — |
| 1975 | 145 | −2.49% |
| 1982 | 146 | +0.10% |
| 1990 | 133 | −1.16% |
| 1999 | 143 | +0.81% |
| 2007 | 151 | +0.68% |
| 2012 | 141 | −1.36% |
| 2017 | 130 | −1.61% |
| 2023 | 119 | −1.46% |
Source: INSEE

== See also ==
- Communes of the Aube department
