= Cussangy =

Commune in Grand Est, France

- Commune
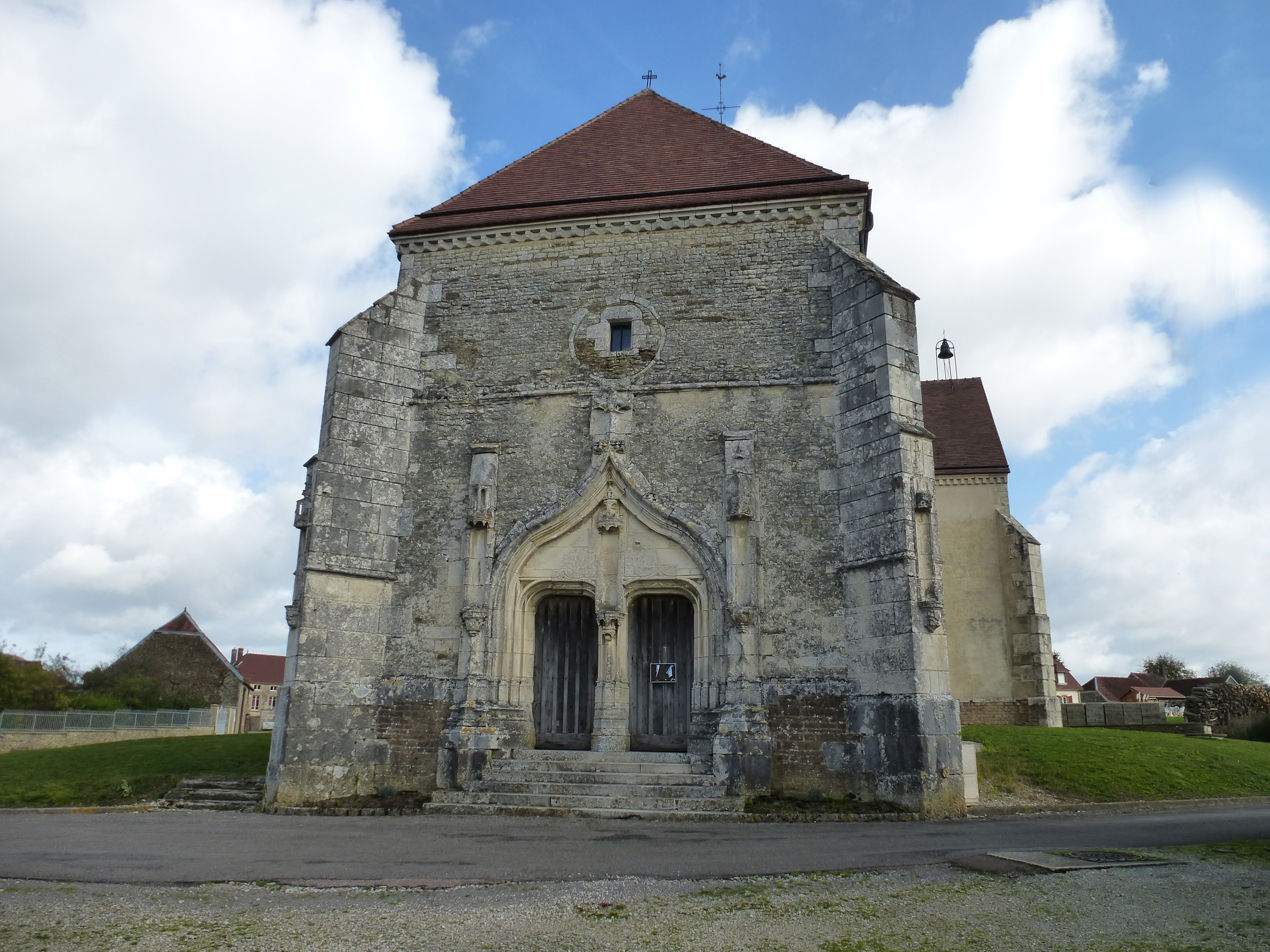
- The church in Cussangy
- Location of Cussangy
- Location within France Location within Grand Est
- Coordinates: 48°01′07″N 4°06′12″E
- Country: France
- Region: Grand Est
- Department: Aube
- Arrondissement: Troyes
- Canton: Les Riceys

Government
  - Mayor (2021–2026): Aurore Vidal
- Area^{1}: 21.39 km^{2} (8.26 sq mi)
- Elevation: 219 m (719 ft)
- Population (2023): 200
  - Density: 9.4/km^{2} (24/sq mi)
- Time zone: UTC+01:00 (CET)
  - Summer (DST): UTC+02:00 (CEST)
- INSEE/Postal code: 10120 /10210
- ^{1} French Land Register data, which excludes lakes, ponds, glaciers > 1 km^{2} (0.386 sq mi or 247 acres) and river estuaries.

Cussangy (French pronunciation: [kysɑ̃ʒi]) is a commune in the Aube department in north-central France. Its inhabitants are called cussangeois (male) and cussangeoises (female).

== Population ==
Historical population
Year	Pop.	±% p.a.
1968	282	—
1975	258	−1.26%
1982	225	−1.94%
1990	209	−0.92%
1999	199	−0.54%
2007	202	+0.19%
2012	210	+0.78%
2017	239	+2.62%
2023	200	−2.93%
Source: INSEE

== See also ==
- Communes of the Aube department
