= Étourvy =

Commune in Grand Est, France

- Commune
- Location of Étourvy
- Location within France Location within Grand Est
- Coordinates: 47°57′28″N 4°07′52″E
- Country: France
- Region: Grand Est
- Department: Aube
- Arrondissement: Troyes
- Canton: Les Riceys

Government
  - Mayor (2025–2026): Michel Bouché
- Area^{1}: 15.41 km^{2} (5.95 sq mi)
- Elevation: 206 m (676 ft)
- Population (2023): 141
  - Density: 9.15/km^{2} (23.7/sq mi)
- Time zone: UTC+01:00 (CET)
  - Summer (DST): UTC+02:00 (CEST)
- INSEE/Postal code: 10143 /10210
- ^{1} French Land Register data, which excludes lakes, ponds, glaciers > 1 km^{2} (0.386 sq mi or 247 acres) and river estuaries.

Étourvy (French pronunciation: [etuʁvi]) is a commune in the Aube department of north-central France.

== Population ==
Historical population
Year	Pop.	±% p.a.
1968	245	—
1975	228	−1.02%
1982	219	−0.57%
1990	190	−1.76%
1999	196	+0.35%
2007	220	+1.45%
2012	200	−1.89%
2017	173	−2.86%
2023	141	−3.35%
Source: INSEE

== See also ==
- Communes of the Aube department
