= Saint-Pouange =

Commune in Grand Est, France

- Commune
- Location of Saint-Pouange
- Location within France Location within Grand Est
- Coordinates: 48°13′32″N 4°02′34″E
- Country: France
- Region: Grand Est
- Department: Aube
- Arrondissement: Troyes
- Canton: Les Riceys
- Intercommunality: CA Troyes Champagne Métropole

Government
  - Mayor (2020–2026): Olivier Duquesnoy
- Area^{1}: 10.02 km^{2} (3.87 sq mi)
- Highest elevation: 146 m (479 ft)
- Lowest elevation: 114 m (374 ft)
- Population (2023): 1,010
  - Density: 101/km^{2} (261/sq mi)
- Time zone: UTC+01:00 (CET)
  - Summer (DST): UTC+02:00 (CEST)
- INSEE/Postal code: 10360 /10120
- ^{1} French Land Register data, which excludes lakes, ponds, glaciers > 1 km^{2} (0.386 sq mi or 247 acres) and river estuaries.

Saint-Pouange is a commune in the Aube department in north-central France.

== Population ==
Historical population
Year	Pop.	±% p.a.
1968	207	—
1975	296	+5.24%
1982	589	+10.33%
1990	778	+3.54%
1999	719	−0.87%
2007	878	+2.53%
2012	915	+0.83%
2017	914	−0.02%
2023	1,010	+1.68%
Source: INSEE

== See also ==
- Communes of the Aube department
