= Souligny =

Commune in Grand Est, France

- Commune
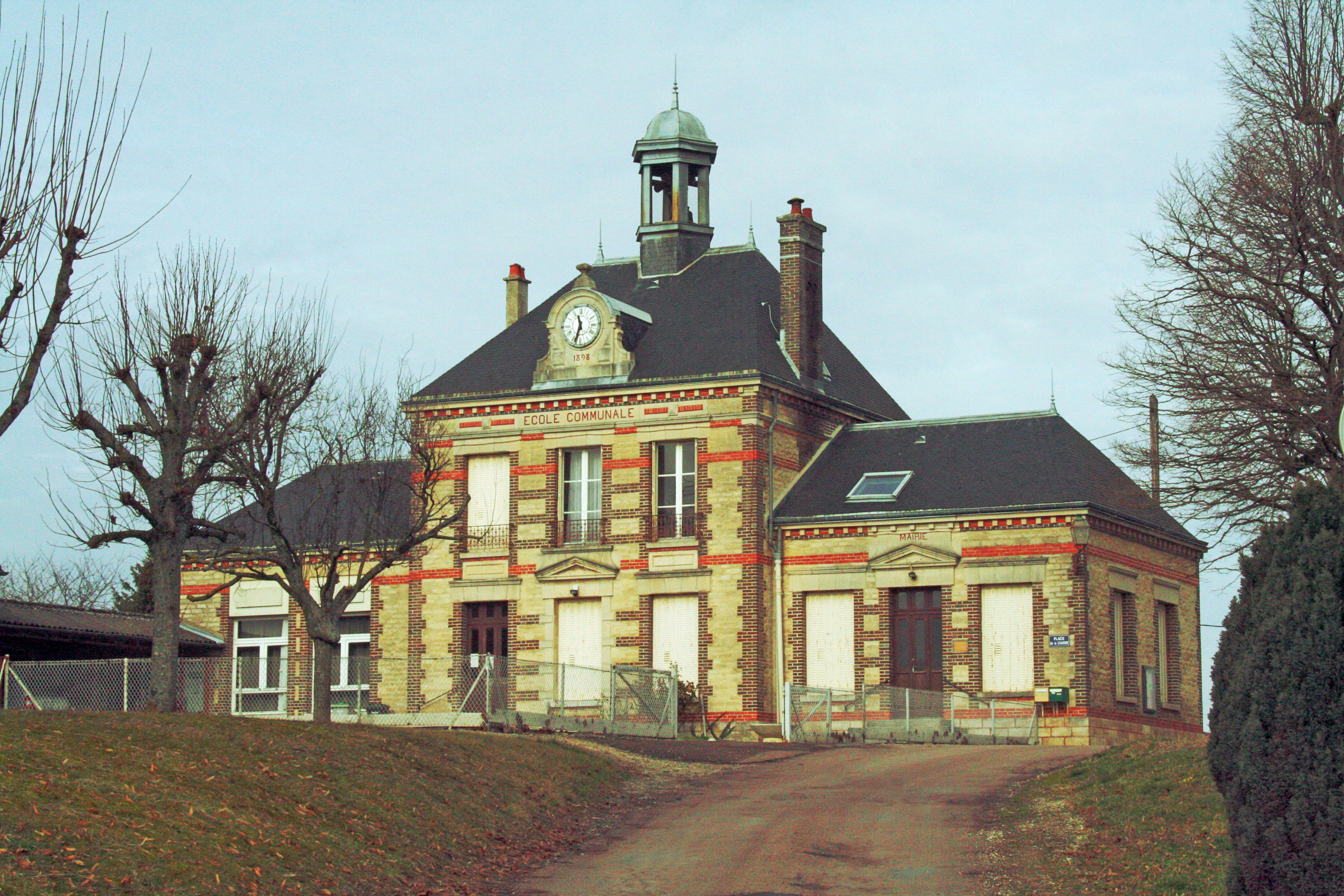
- The town hall in Souligny
- Location of Souligny
- Location within France Location within Grand Est
- Coordinates: 48°12′18″N 3°59′52″E
- Country: France
- Region: Grand Est
- Department: Aube
- Arrondissement: Troyes
- Canton: Les Riceys
- Intercommunality: CA Troyes Champagne Métropole

Government
  - Mayor (2020–2026): Michelle Malarmey
- Area^{1}: 10.59 km^{2} (4.09 sq mi)
- Elevation: 155 m (509 ft)
- Highest elevation: 283 m (928 ft)
- Lowest elevation: 169 m (554 ft)
- Population (2023): 381
  - Density: 36.0/km^{2} (93.2/sq mi)
- Time zone: UTC+01:00 (CET)
  - Summer (DST): UTC+02:00 (CEST)
- INSEE/Postal code: 10373 /10320
- ^{1} French Land Register data, which excludes lakes, ponds, glaciers > 1 km^{2} (0.386 sq mi or 247 acres) and river estuaries.

Souligny is a commune in the Aube department in north-central France.

== Population ==
Historical population
Year	Pop.	±% p.a.
1968	276	—
1975	301	+1.25%
1982	351	+2.22%
1990	341	−0.36%
1999	359	+0.57%
2007	406	+1.55%
2012	422	+0.78%
2017	400	−1.07%
2023	381	−0.81%
Source: INSEE

== See also ==
- Communes of the Aube department
