= Pargues =

Commune in Grand Est, France

- Commune
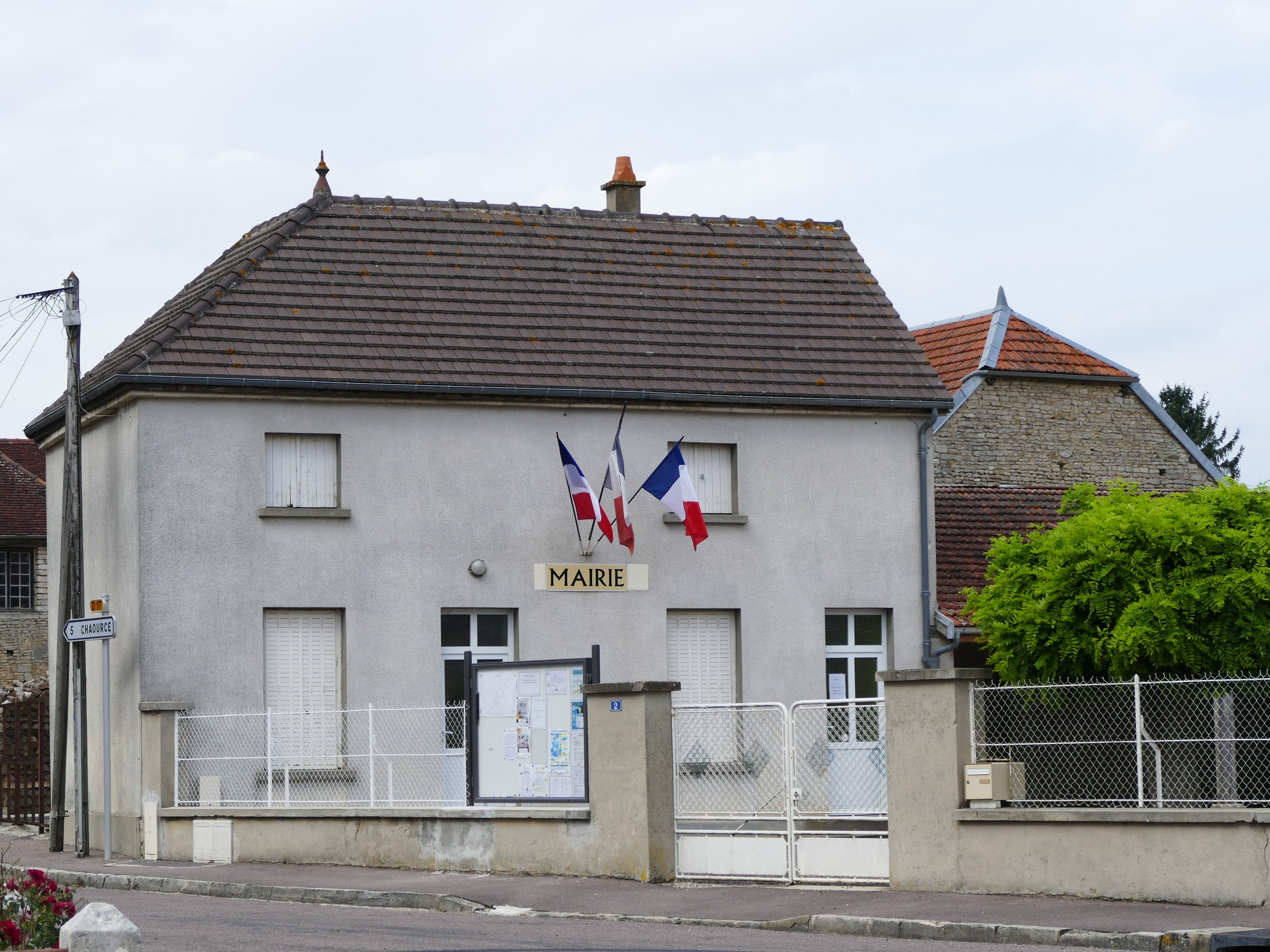
- The town hall in Pargues

- Coat of arms
- Location of Pargues
- Location within France Location within Grand Est
- Coordinates: 48°01′59″N 4°11′55″E
- Country: France
- Region: Grand Est
- Department: Aube
- Arrondissement: Troyes
- Canton: Les Riceys

Government
  - Mayor (2020–2026): Matthieu Banceron
- Area^{1}: 13.98 km^{2} (5.40 sq mi)
- Elevation: 204 m (669 ft)
- Population (2023): 143
  - Density: 10.2/km^{2} (26.5/sq mi)
- Time zone: UTC+01:00 (CET)
  - Summer (DST): UTC+02:00 (CEST)
- INSEE/Postal code: 10278 /10210
- ^{1} French Land Register data, which excludes lakes, ponds, glaciers > 1 km^{2} (0.386 sq mi or 247 acres) and river estuaries.

Pargues (French pronunciation: [paʁɡ]) is a commune in the Aube department in north-central France.

== Population ==
Historical population
Year	Pop.	±% p.a.
1968	180	—
1975	170	−0.81%
1982	147	−2.06%
1990	138	−0.79%
1999	130	−0.66%
2007	122	−0.79%
2012	126	+0.65%
2017	138	+1.84%
2023	143	+0.59%
Source: INSEE

== See also ==
- Communes of the Aube department
