= Praslin, Aube =

Commune in Grand Est, France

Praslin
- Commune
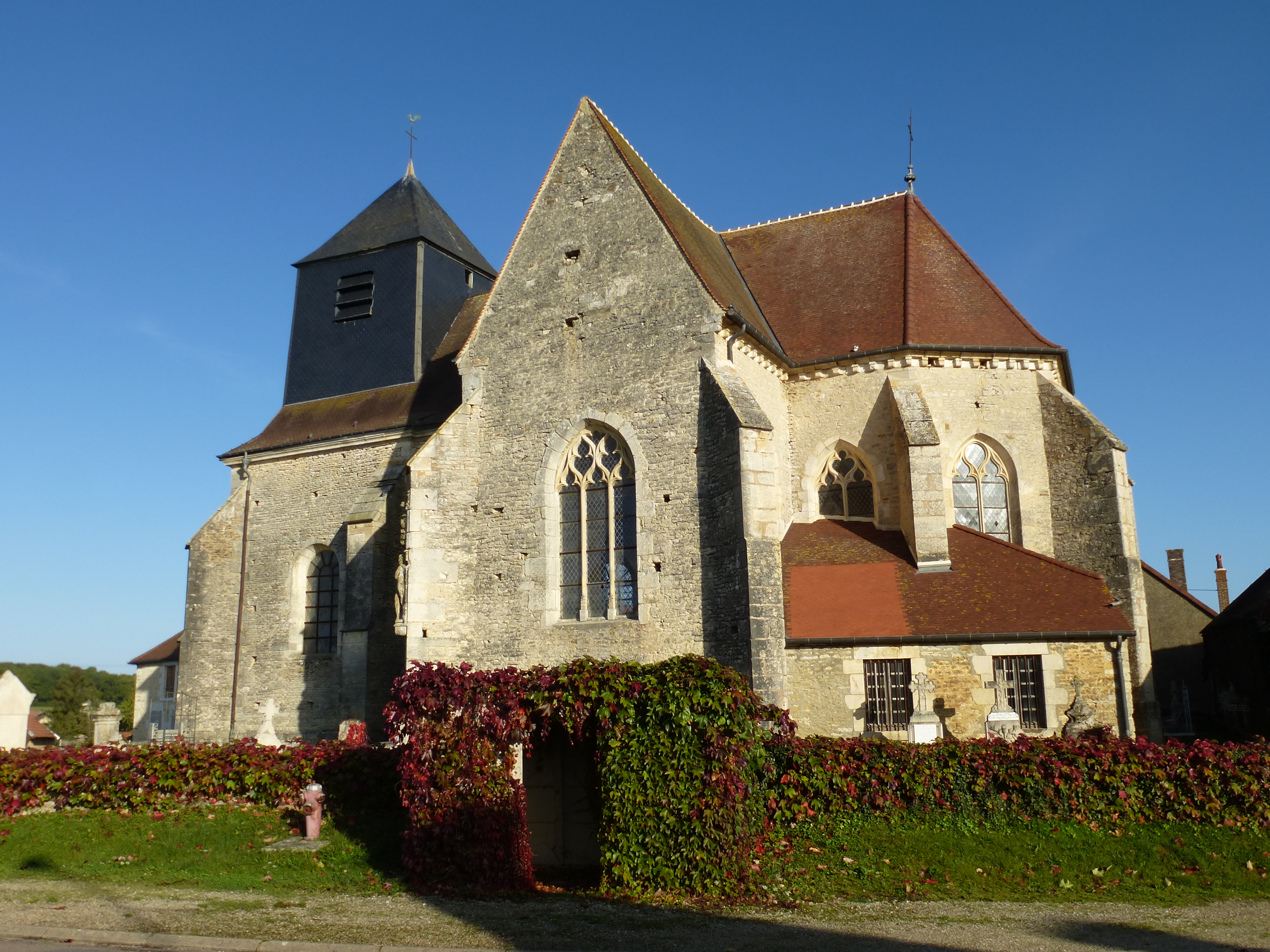
- The church in Praslin

- Coat of arms
- Location of Praslin
- Location within France Location within Grand Est
- Coordinates: 48°02′50″N 4°12′00″E
- Country: France
- Region: Grand Est
- Department: Aube
- Arrondissement: Troyes
- Canton: Les Riceys

Government
  - Mayor (2020–2026): Jean-Baptiste Laurey
- Area^{1}: 11.98 km^{2} (4.63 sq mi)
- Elevation: 220 m (720 ft)
- Population (2023): 92
  - Density: 7.7/km^{2} (20/sq mi)
- Time zone: UTC+01:00 (CET)
  - Summer (DST): UTC+02:00 (CEST)
- INSEE/Postal code: 10302 /10210
- ^{1} French Land Register data, which excludes lakes, ponds, glaciers > 1 km^{2} (0.386 sq mi or 247 acres) and river estuaries.

Praslin (French pronunciation: [pʁalɛ̃]) is a commune in the Aube department in north-central France.

== Heraldry ==
Arms of Praslin.	Quarterly: 1st azure a cross or cantoned with four billets of the same, 2nd argent a monumental fountain of the place vert on an isolated terrace in a demi-lune of the same charged with waves sable, 3rd argent an oak of tenné, leaved and acorned vert, 4th azure a bend or, charged with a sword low argent and flanked by two bars or potent counter-potent inwardly.

== Population ==
Historical population
Year	Pop.	±% p.a.
1968	84	—
1975	81	−0.52%
1982	59	−4.43%
1990	60	+0.21%
1999	63	+0.54%
2007	56	−1.46%
2012	94	+10.91%
2017	90	−0.87%
2023	92	+0.37%
Source: INSEE

== See also ==
- Communes of the Aube department
