= Villiers-le-Bois =

Commune in Grand Est, France

- Commune
- Location of Villiers-le-Bois
- Location within France Location within Grand Est
- Coordinates: 47°57′35″N 4°11′20″E
- Country: France
- Region: Grand Est
- Department: Aube
- Arrondissement: Troyes
- Canton: Les Riceys

Government
  - Mayor (2020–2026): Didier Coquet
- Area^{1}: 5.16 km^{2} (1.99 sq mi)
- Population (2023): 99
  - Density: 19/km^{2} (50/sq mi)
- Time zone: UTC+01:00 (CET)
  - Summer (DST): UTC+02:00 (CEST)
- INSEE/Postal code: 10431 /10210
- ^{1} French Land Register data, which excludes lakes, ponds, glaciers > 1 km^{2} (0.386 sq mi or 247 acres) and river estuaries.

Villiers-le-Bois (French pronunciation: [vilje lə bwa]) is a commune in the Aube department in north-central France.

== Population ==
Historical population
Year	Pop.	±% p.a.
1968	119	—
1975	94	−3.31%
1982	82	−1.93%
1990	86	+0.60%
1999	94	+0.99%
2007	96	+0.26%
2012	101	+1.02%
2017	96	−1.01%
2023	99	+0.51%
Source: INSEE

== See also ==
- Communes of the Aube department
