= Saint-Jean-de-Bonneval =

Commune in Grand Est, France

- Commune
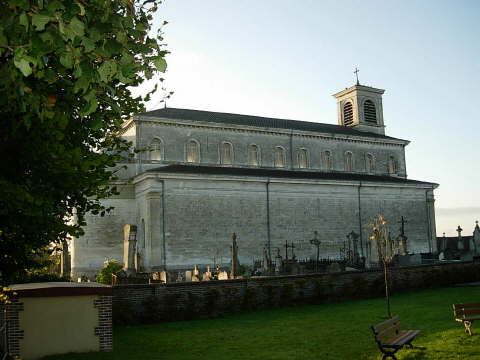
- The church in Saint-Jean-de-Bonneval

- Coat of arms
- Location of Saint-Jean-de-Bonneval
- Location within France Location within Grand Est
- Coordinates: 48°10′23″N 4°02′58″E
- Country: France
- Region: Grand Est
- Department: Aube
- Arrondissement: Troyes
- Canton: Les Riceys
- Intercommunality: CA Troyes Champagne Métropole

Government
  - Mayor (2020–2026): Jean-Michel Cochet
- Area^{1}: 6.14 km^{2} (2.37 sq mi)
- Elevation: 129 m (423 ft)
- Population (2023): 405
  - Density: 66.0/km^{2} (171/sq mi)
- Time zone: UTC+01:00 (CET)
  - Summer (DST): UTC+02:00 (CEST)
- INSEE/Postal code: 10342 /10320
- ^{1} French Land Register data, which excludes lakes, ponds, glaciers > 1 km^{2} (0.386 sq mi or 247 acres) and river estuaries.

Saint-Jean-de-Bonneval (French pronunciation: [sɛ̃ ʒɑ̃ də bɔnval]) is a commune in the Aube department in north-central France. It features a noted church, the Église paroissiale Saint-Jean-Baptiste, built in 1830 after the previous church collapsed.

== Population ==
Historical population
Year	Pop.	±% p.a.
1968	284	—
1975	261	−1.20%
1982	329	+3.36%
1990	354	+0.92%
1999	351	−0.09%
2007	392	+1.39%
2012	355	−1.96%
2017	396	+2.21%
2023	405	+0.38%
Source: INSEE

== See also ==
- Communes of the Aube department
