= Maisons-lès-Chaource =

Commune in Grand Est, France

- Commune
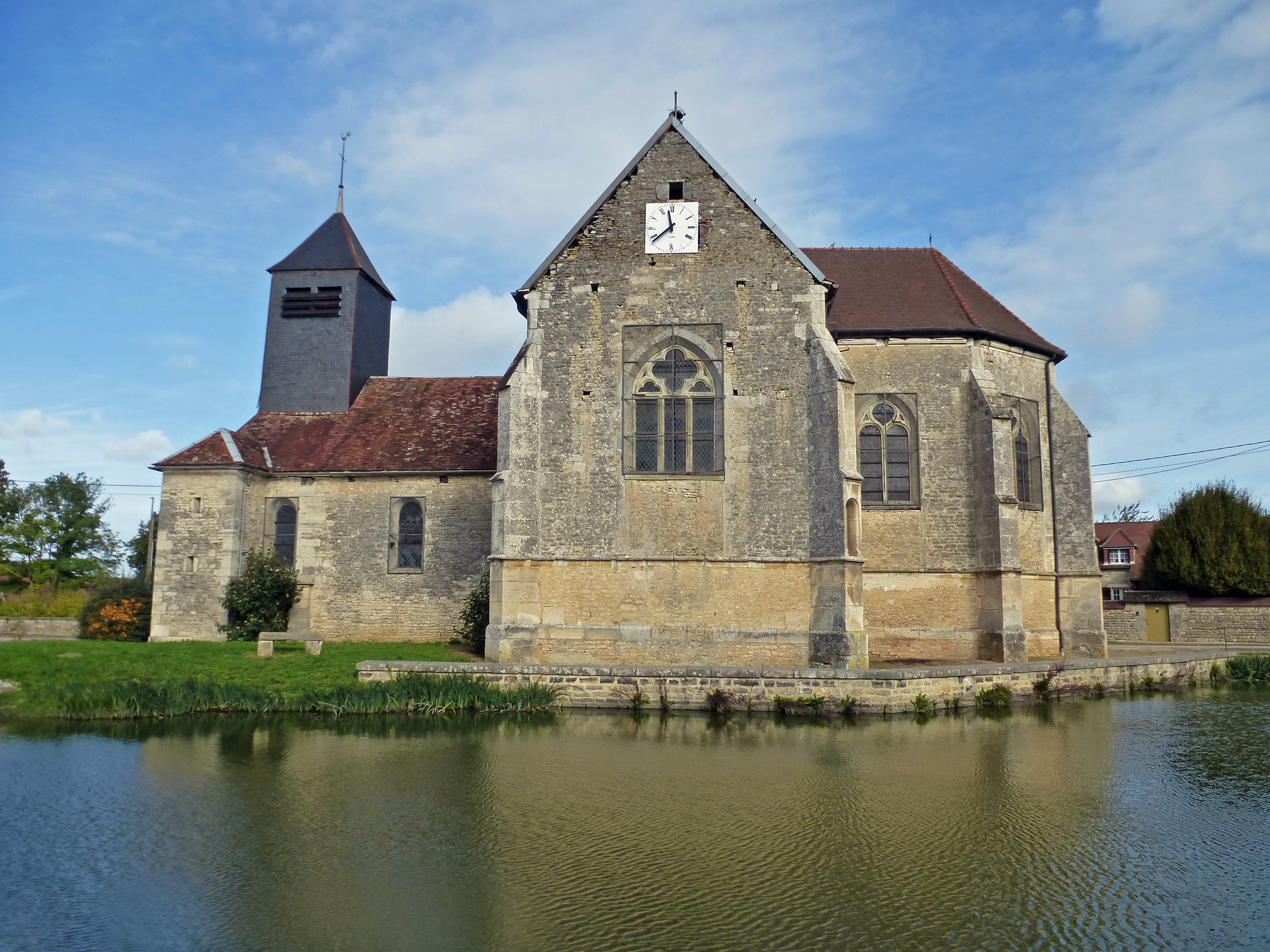
- The church in Maisons-lès-Chaource
- Location of Maisons-lès-Chaource
- Location within France Location within Grand Est
- Coordinates: 48°00′38″N 4°09′59″E
- Country: France
- Region: Grand Est
- Department: Aube
- Arrondissement: Troyes
- Canton: Les Riceys

Government
  - Mayor (2020–2026): Gérard Guéry
- Area^{1}: 5.85 km^{2} (2.26 sq mi)
- Population (2023): 177
  - Density: 30.3/km^{2} (78.4/sq mi)
- Time zone: UTC+01:00 (CET)
  - Summer (DST): UTC+02:00 (CEST)
- INSEE/Postal code: 10218 /10210
- ^{1} French Land Register data, which excludes lakes, ponds, glaciers > 1 km^{2} (0.386 sq mi or 247 acres) and river estuaries.

Maisons-lès-Chaource (French pronunciation: [mɛzɔ̃ lɛ ʃauʁs], literally Maisons near Chaource) is a commune in the Aube department in north-central France.

== Population ==
Historical population
Year	Pop.	±% p.a.
1968	173	—
1975	167	−0.50%
1982	164	−0.26%
1990	171	+0.52%
1999	188	+1.06%
2007	177	−0.75%
2012	190	+1.43%
2017	158	−3.62%
2023	177	+1.91%
Source: INSEE

== See also ==
- Communes of the Aube department
