= Villy-le-Bois =

Commune in Grand Est, France

- Commune
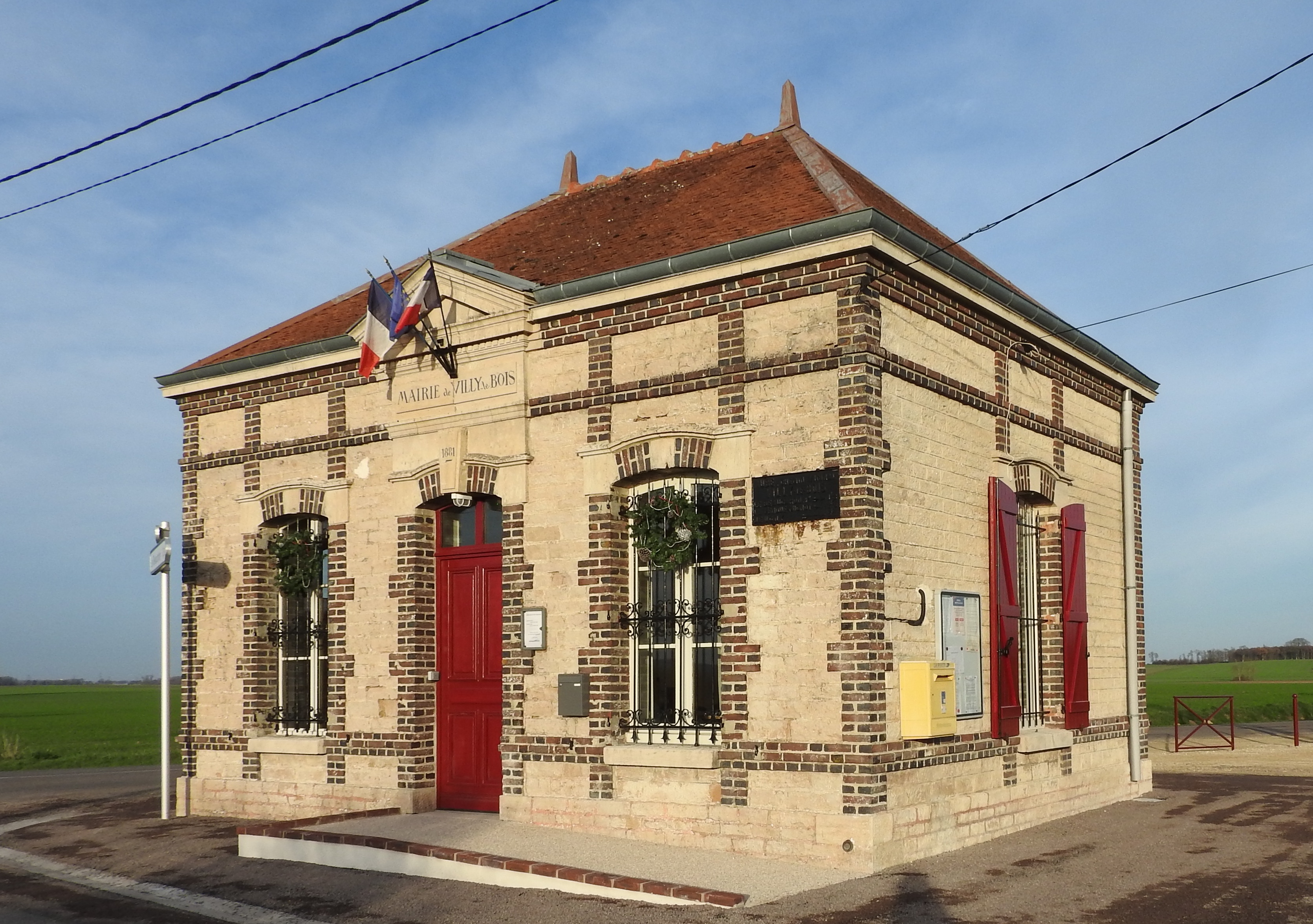
- The town hall in Villy-le-Bois
- Location of Villy-le-Bois
- Location within France Location within Grand Est
- Coordinates: 48°09′42″N 4°05′38″E
- Country: France
- Region: Grand Est
- Department: Aube
- Arrondissement: Troyes
- Canton: Les Riceys
- Intercommunality: CA Troyes Champagne Métropole

Government
  - Mayor (2020–2026): Sophie Richard
- Area^{1}: 5.41 km^{2} (2.09 sq mi)
- Elevation: 130 m (430 ft)
- Population (2023): 57
  - Density: 11/km^{2} (27/sq mi)
- Time zone: UTC+01:00 (CET)
  - Summer (DST): UTC+02:00 (CEST)
- INSEE/Postal code: 10434 /10800
- ^{1} French Land Register data, which excludes lakes, ponds, glaciers > 1 km^{2} (0.386 sq mi or 247 acres) and river estuaries.

Villy-le-Bois is a commune in the Aube department in north-central France.

== Population ==
Historical population
Year	Pop.	±% p.a.
1968	47	—
1975	24	−9.15%
1982	37	+6.38%
1990	36	−0.34%
1999	56	+5.03%
2007	60	+0.87%
2012	66	+1.92%
2017	55	−3.58%
2023	57	+0.60%
Source: INSEE

== See also ==
- Communes of the Aube department
