= Villery =

Commune in Grand Est, France

- Commune
- Location of Villery
- Location within France Location within Grand Est
- Coordinates: 48°10′18″N 4°01′11″E
- Country: France
- Region: Grand Est
- Department: Aube
- Arrondissement: Troyes
- Canton: Les Riceys
- Intercommunality: CA Troyes Champagne Métropole

Government
  - Mayor (2020–2026): Bruno Houard
- Area^{1}: 3.59 km^{2} (1.39 sq mi)
- Elevation: 171 m (561 ft)
- Population (2023): 277
  - Density: 77.2/km^{2} (200/sq mi)
- Time zone: UTC+01:00 (CET)
  - Summer (DST): UTC+02:00 (CEST)
- INSEE/Postal code: 10425 /10320
- ^{1} French Land Register data, which excludes lakes, ponds, glaciers > 1 km^{2} (0.386 sq mi or 247 acres) and river estuaries.

Villery (French pronunciation: [vilʁi]) is a commune in the Aube department in north-central France.

== Population ==
Historical population
Year	Pop.	±% p.a.
1968	136	—
1975	260	+9.70%
1982	313	+2.69%
1990	292	−0.86%
1999	287	−0.19%
2007	275	−0.53%
2012	272	−0.22%
2017	275	+0.22%
2023	277	+0.12%
Source: INSEE

== See also ==
- Communes of the Aube department
