= Bragelogne-Beauvoir =

Commune in Grand Est, France

- Commune
- Coat of arms
- Location of Bragelogne-Beauvoir
- Location within France Location within Grand Est
- Coordinates: 47°58′09″N 4°15′58″E
- Country: France
- Region: Grand Est
- Department: Aube
- Arrondissement: Troyes
- Canton: Les Riceys

Government
  - Mayor (2022–2026): Hervé Griffon
- Area^{1}: 23.39 km^{2} (9.03 sq mi)
- Elevation: 260 m (850 ft)
- Population (2023): 217
  - Density: 9.28/km^{2} (24.0/sq mi)
- Time zone: UTC+01:00 (CET)
  - Summer (DST): UTC+02:00 (CEST)
- INSEE/Postal code: 10058 /10340
- ^{1} French Land Register data, which excludes lakes, ponds, glaciers > 1 km^{2} (0.386 sq mi or 247 acres) and river estuaries.

Bragelogne-Beauvoir (French pronunciation: [bʁaʒlɔɲ bovwaʁ]) is a commune in the Aube department in north-central France.

== Population ==
Historical population
Year	Pop.	±% p.a.
1968	298	—
1975	277	−1.04%
1982	265	−0.63%
1990	284	+0.87%
1999	272	−0.48%
2007	280	+0.36%
2012	251	−2.16%
2017	243	−0.65%
2023	217	−1.87%
Source: INSEE

== See also ==
- Communes of the Aube department
