= Maupas, Aube =

Commune in Grand Est, France

Maupas
- Commune
- Coat of arms
- Location of Maupas
- Location within France Location within Grand Est
- Coordinates: 48°08′10″N 4°04′32″E
- Country: France
- Region: Grand Est
- Department: Aube
- Arrondissement: Troyes
- Canton: Les Riceys
- Intercommunality: CA Troyes Champagne Métropole

Government
  - Mayor (2020–2026): Jérémy Lebecq
- Area^{1}: 4.26 km^{2} (1.64 sq mi)
- Elevation: 138 m (453 ft)
- Population (2023): 98
  - Density: 23/km^{2} (60/sq mi)
- Time zone: UTC+01:00 (CET)
  - Summer (DST): UTC+02:00 (CEST)
- INSEE/Postal code: 10229 /10320
- ^{1} French Land Register data, which excludes lakes, ponds, glaciers > 1 km^{2} (0.386 sq mi or 247 acres) and river estuaries.

Maupas (French pronunciation: [mopa]) is a commune in the Aube department in north-central France.

== Population ==
Historical population
Year	Pop.	±% p.a.
1968	45	—
1975	64	+5.16%
1982	66	+0.44%
1990	71	+0.92%
1999	82	+1.61%
2007	94	+1.72%
2012	111	+3.38%
2017	105	−1.11%
2023	98	−1.14%
Source: INSEE

== See also ==
- Communes of the Aube department
