= Chesley, Aube =

Commune in Grand Est, France

Chesley
- Commune
- Coat of arms
- Location of Chesley
- Location within France Location within Grand Est
- Coordinates: 47°58′40″N 4°06′39″E
- Country: France
- Region: Grand Est
- Department: Aube
- Arrondissement: Troyes
- Canton: Les Riceys

Government
  - Mayor (2022–2026): Joëlle Berthe
- Area^{1}: 21.17 km^{2} (8.17 sq mi)
- Elevation: 100 m (330 ft)
- Population (2023): 293
  - Density: 13.8/km^{2} (35.8/sq mi)
- Time zone: UTC+01:00 (CET)
  - Summer (DST): UTC+02:00 (CEST)
- INSEE/Postal code: 10098 /10210
- ^{1} French Land Register data, which excludes lakes, ponds, glaciers > 1 km^{2} (0.386 sq mi or 247 acres) and river estuaries.

Chesley (French pronunciation: [ʃɛlɛ]) is a commune in the Aube department in north-central France.

== Population ==
Historical population
Year	Pop.	±% p.a.
1968	399	—
1975	353	−1.73%
1982	344	−0.37%
1990	317	−1.02%
1999	320	+0.10%
2007	340	+0.76%
2012	328	−0.72%
2017	325	−0.18%
2023	293	−1.71%
Source: INSEE

== See also ==
- Communes of the Aube department
