= Villy-le-Maréchal =

Commune in Grand Est, France

- Commune
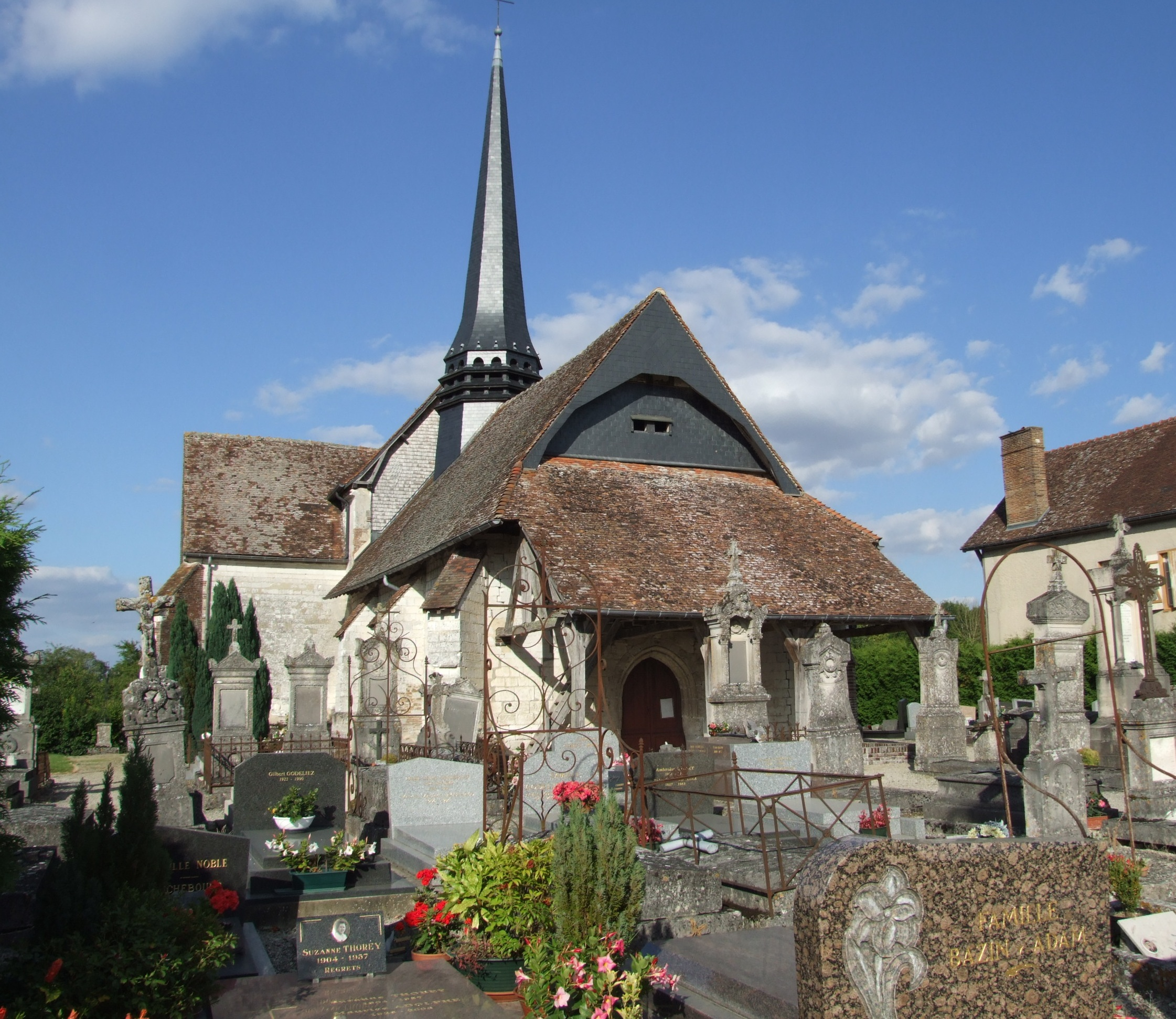
- The church in Villy-le-Maréchal
- Location of Villy-le-Maréchal
- Location within France Location within Grand Est
- Coordinates: 48°11′18″N 4°04′34″E
- Country: France
- Region: Grand Est
- Department: Aube
- Arrondissement: Troyes
- Canton: Les Riceys
- Intercommunality: CA Troyes Champagne Métropole

Government
  - Mayor (2020–2026): Christine Petit
- Area^{1}: 3.29 km^{2} (1.27 sq mi)
- Elevation: 135 m (443 ft)
- Population (2023): 197
  - Density: 59.9/km^{2} (155/sq mi)
- Time zone: UTC+01:00 (CET)
  - Summer (DST): UTC+02:00 (CEST)
- INSEE/Postal code: 10435 /10800
- ^{1} French Land Register data, which excludes lakes, ponds, glaciers > 1 km^{2} (0.386 sq mi or 247 acres) and river estuaries.

Villy-le-Maréchal is a commune in the Aube department in north-central France.

== Population ==
Historical population
Year	Pop.	±% p.a.
1968	111	—
1975	123	+1.48%
1982	140	+1.87%
1990	135	−0.45%
1999	132	−0.25%
2007	142	+0.92%
2012	175	+4.27%
2017	188	+1.44%
2023	197	+0.78%
Source: INSEE

== See also ==
- Communes of the Aube department
