= Châtres =

Châtres may refer to:

- Châtres, Aube, a commune of the Aube département, France
- Châtres, Dordogne, a commune of the Dordogne département, France
- Châtres, Seine-et-Marne, a commune of the Seine-et-Marne département, France
- Châtres-la-Forêt, a commune of the Mayenne département, France
- Châtres-sur-Cher, a commune of the Loir-et-Cher département, France

== See also ==
- Chartres, a commune and capital of the Eure-et-Loir department, France
