= Henri Bouchet-Doumenq =

French painter (1834–1884)

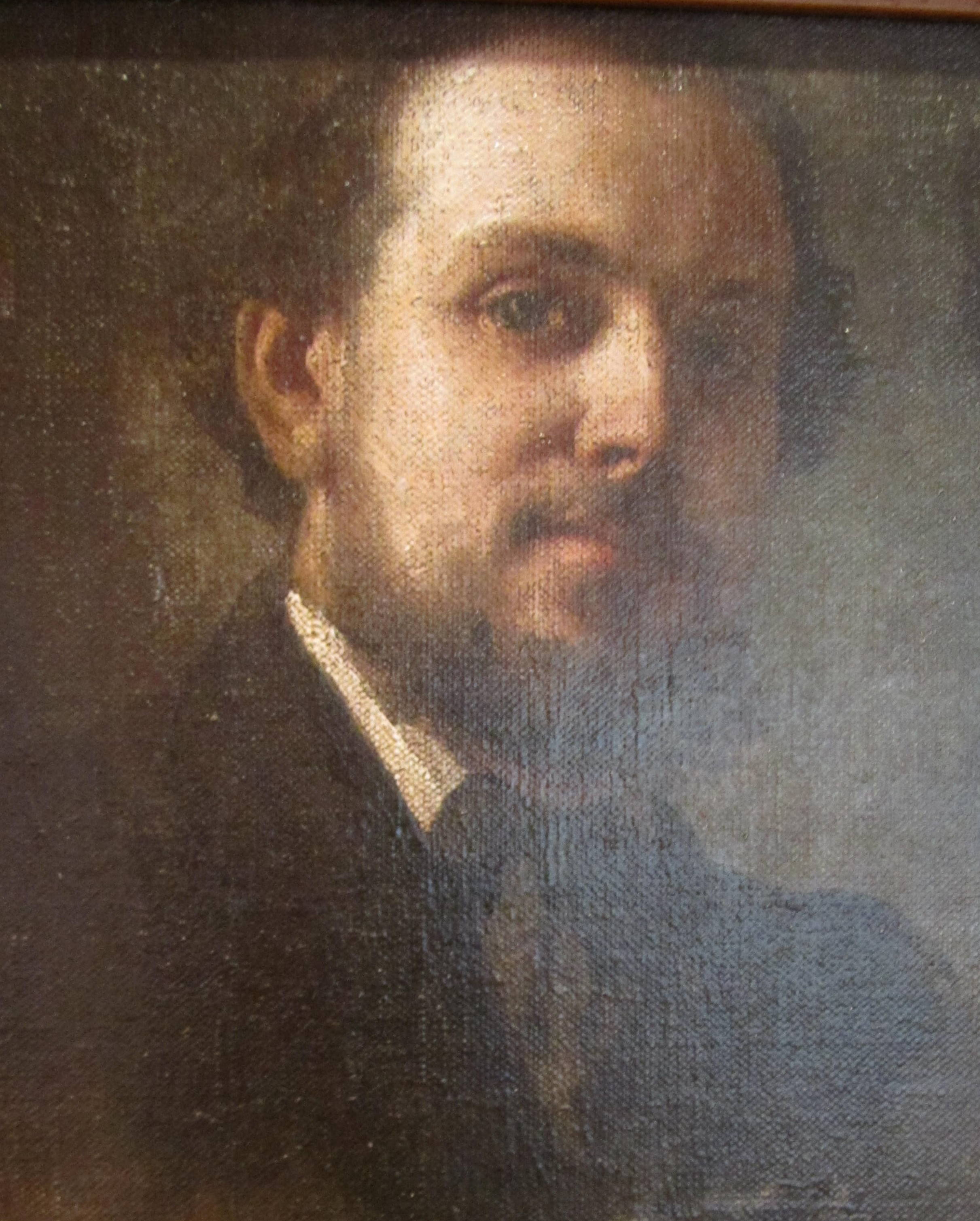
Henri Bouchet-Doumenq.

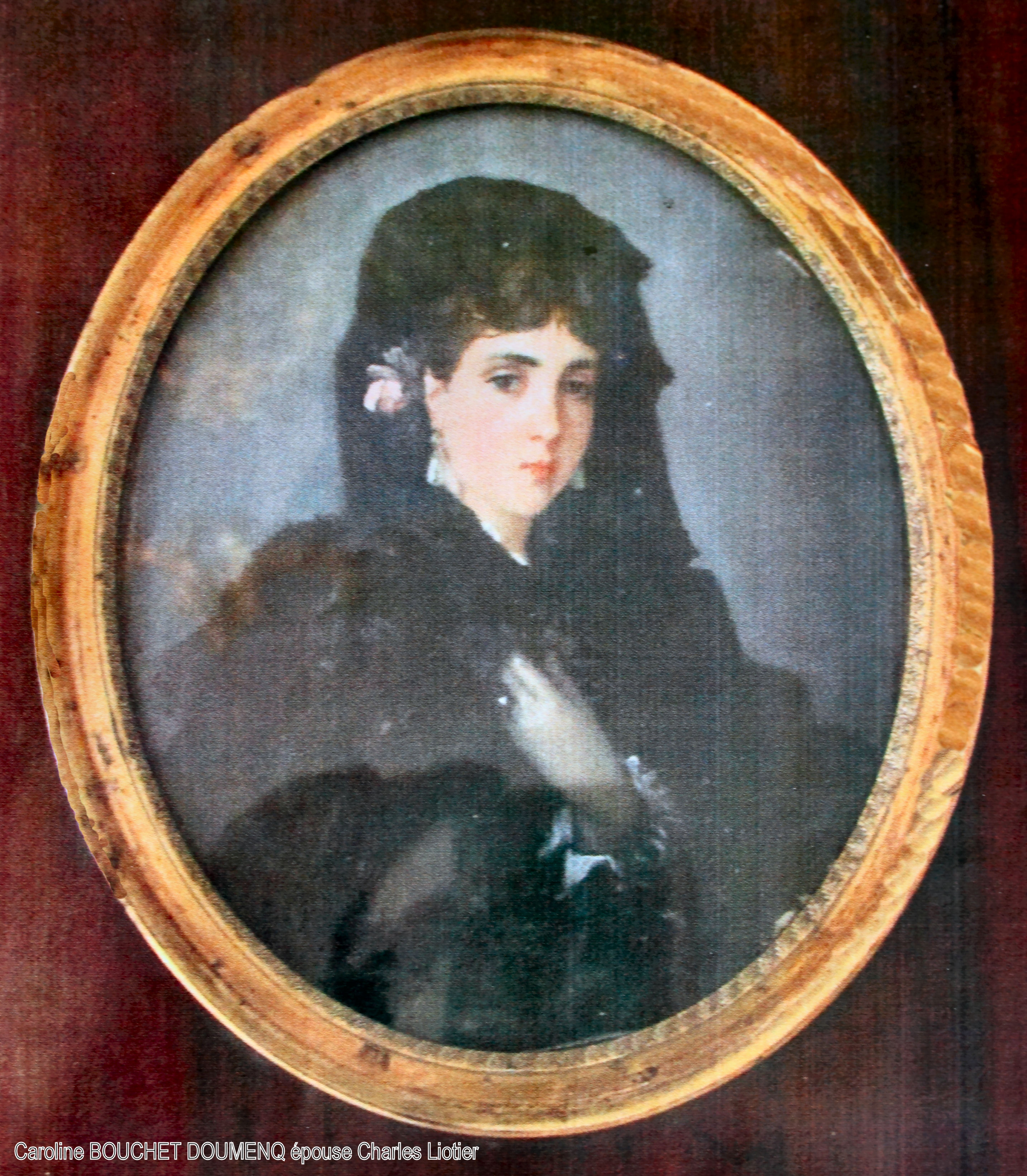
Caroline Bouchet-Doumenq

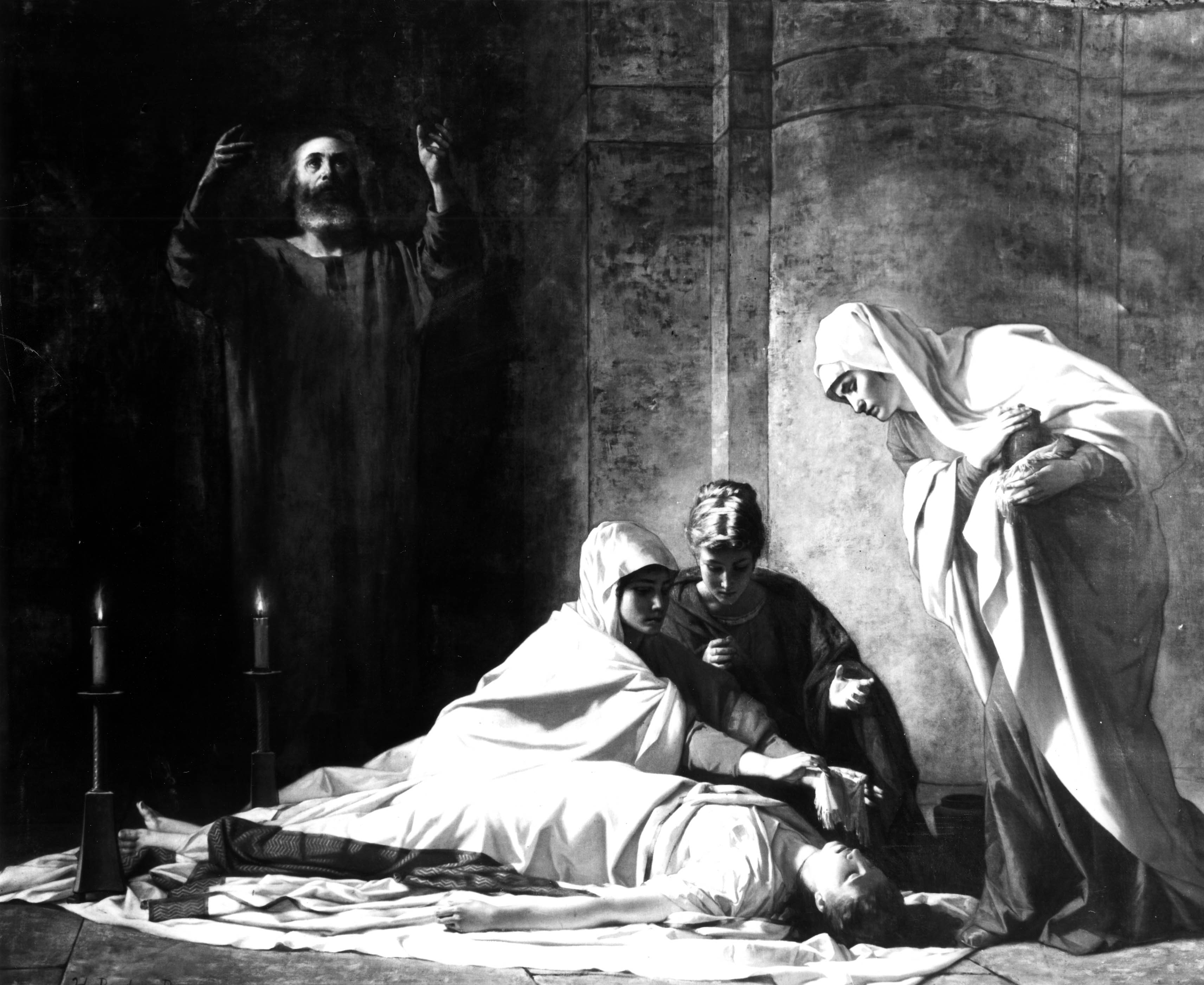
Martyre de Saint Cecilia by Henri Bouchet-Doumenq.

Henri Bouchet-Doumenq (13 May 1834, Paris - 1884) (alternate spellings: Bouchet-Doumeng, Bouchet-Doumencq, Boucher-Doumencq, Boucher-Doumeng, Doumenq-Boucher) was a 19th-century French painter who specialized in portraits and landscapes.

== Life and work ==
He was the second son of the amateur painter Charles Bouchet-Doumenq, whose family was from Montpellier; a work of Charles hangs at the Fondation Calvet. His mother, Antoinette Bonpard, was a native of Vallant-Saint-Georges. The family home was also shared by a friend of the father, Auguste-Barthélemy Glaize, originally from Montpellier. Doumenq studied painting with Glaize and the Swiss painter Marc-Charles-Gabriel Gleyre of the École des Beaux-Arts in Paris. Doumenq was a friend of the painter Eugène Castelnau, and it is through him he met Frédéric Bazille in 1862. He exhibited his paintings on numerous occasions including La Chanteuse in 1865, Jeune fille faisant un bouquet in 1870, Henri B-D au Salon de 1878 in 1878, La rêveuse (Arles) (n°429) (1880), Jeune mère Arlésienne (n°317) (1883), and Dans le Jardin (1886). His works are present in the collections of several museums, Calvet Museum (Avignon), Museum Petiet (Limoux), Library and Museum Inguimbertine City (Carpentras), and the Museum of Fine Arts (Limoges).

He had at least one sibling, a sister, Caroline. In 1880, at the age of 46, Doumenq married his art student, Magdalene Bernard (1854-1896), with whom he had two children, Pierre-Charles (1887-1890) Jean (1893-1915).
