= Longueville =

Longueville may refer to:

== Places ==
=== France ===
- Longueville, Calvados, in the Calvados department
- Longueville, Lot-et-Garonne, in the Lot-et-Garonne department
- Longueville, Manche, in the Manche department
- Longueville, Pas-de-Calais, in the Pas-de-Calais department
- Longueville, Seine-et-Marne, in the Seine-et-Marne department
- Longueville-sur-Aube, in the Aube department
- Longueville-sur-Scie, in the Seine-Maritime department

=== Elsewhere ===
- Longueville, Jersey
- Longueville, New South Wales, suburb of Sydney, Australia
- Orton Longueville, Peterborough, England

== Other ==
- County of Longueville
- Duke of Longueville
- Pichon Longueville, archaic Bordeaux wine estate, presently:
  - Château Pichon Longueville Baron, or Pichon Baron
  - Château Pichon Longueville Comtesse de Lalande, or Pichon Comtesse, or Pichon Lalande
- Longueville baronets, an extinct baronetcy, originally of Nova Scotia and then of Great Britain
- Longueville or Rongubiru, fictional secretary in The Familiar of Zero
