= Saint-Oulph =

Commune in Grand Est, France

- Commune
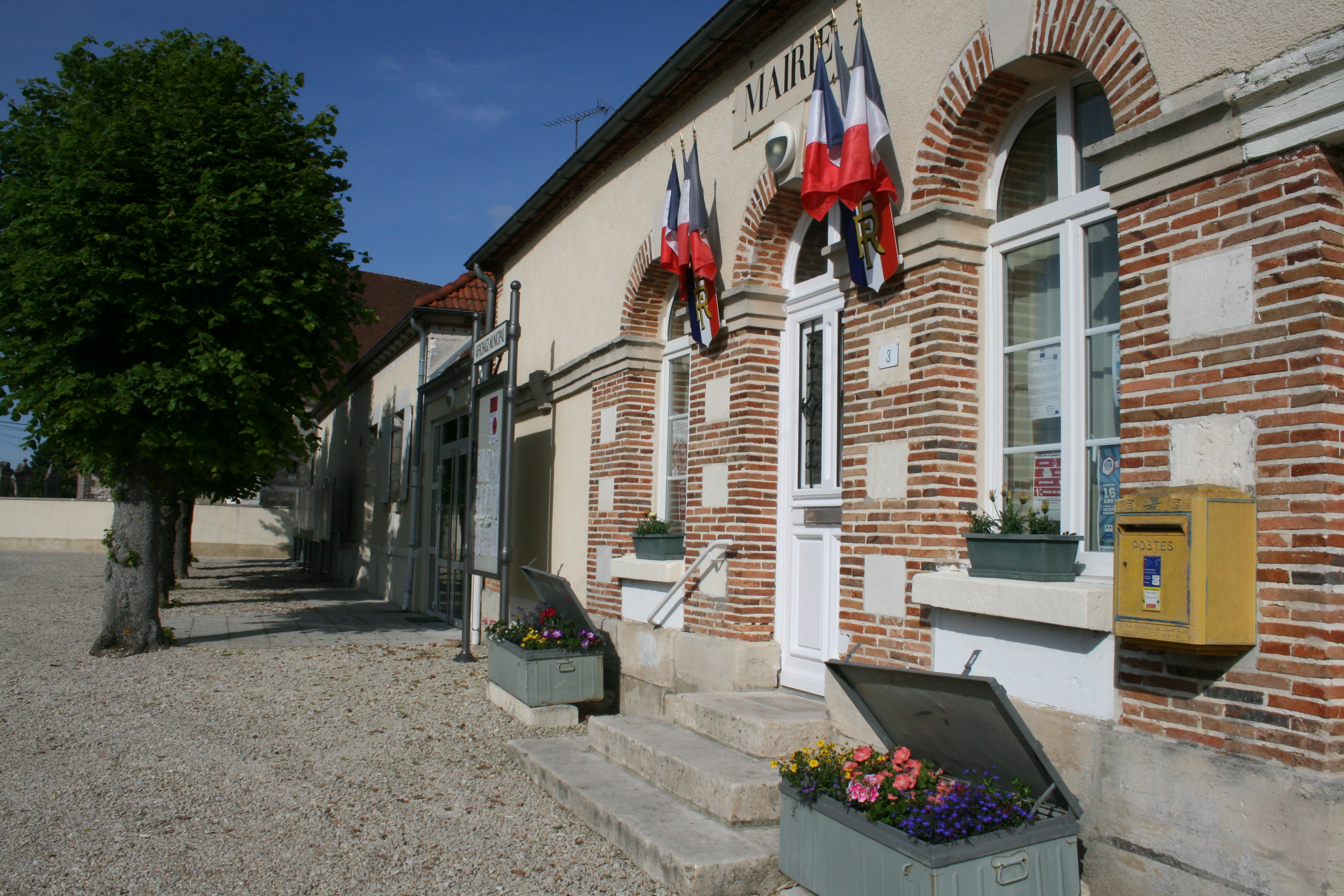
- The town hall in Saint-Oulph
- Location of Saint-Oulph
- Location within France Location within Grand Est
- Coordinates: 48°31′10″N 3°52′05″E
- Country: France
- Region: Grand Est
- Department: Aube
- Arrondissement: Nogent-sur-Seine
- Canton: Creney-près-Troyes

Government
  - Mayor (2020–2026): David Lagarde
- Area^{1}: 10.94 km^{2} (4.22 sq mi)
- Elevation: 78 m (256 ft)
- Population (2023): 320
  - Density: 29/km^{2} (76/sq mi)
- Time zone: UTC+01:00 (CET)
  - Summer (DST): UTC+02:00 (CEST)
- INSEE/Postal code: 10356 /10170
- ^{1} French Land Register data, which excludes lakes, ponds, glaciers > 1 km^{2} (0.386 sq mi or 247 acres) and river estuaries.

Saint-Oulph (French pronunciation: [sɛ̃.t‿ulf]) is a commune in the Aube department in north-central France with the post code 10170.

Inhabitants of Saint-Oulph are known as Saint-Ulphiens or Saint-Ulphiennes.

== Population ==
Historical population
Year	Pop.	±% p.a.
1968	170	—
1975	147	−2.06%
1982	169	+2.01%
1990	173	+0.29%
1999	192	+1.16%
2007	202	+0.64%
2012	242	+3.68%
2017	287	+3.47%
2023	320	+1.83%
Source: INSEE

== Geography ==
Saint-Oulph is located in the Grand Est region approximately a 2 hour and 15 minute drive South-East from Paris and is located on the East bank of the River Seine.

== See also ==
- Communes of the Aube department
