= Trancault =

Commune in Grand Est, France

- Commune
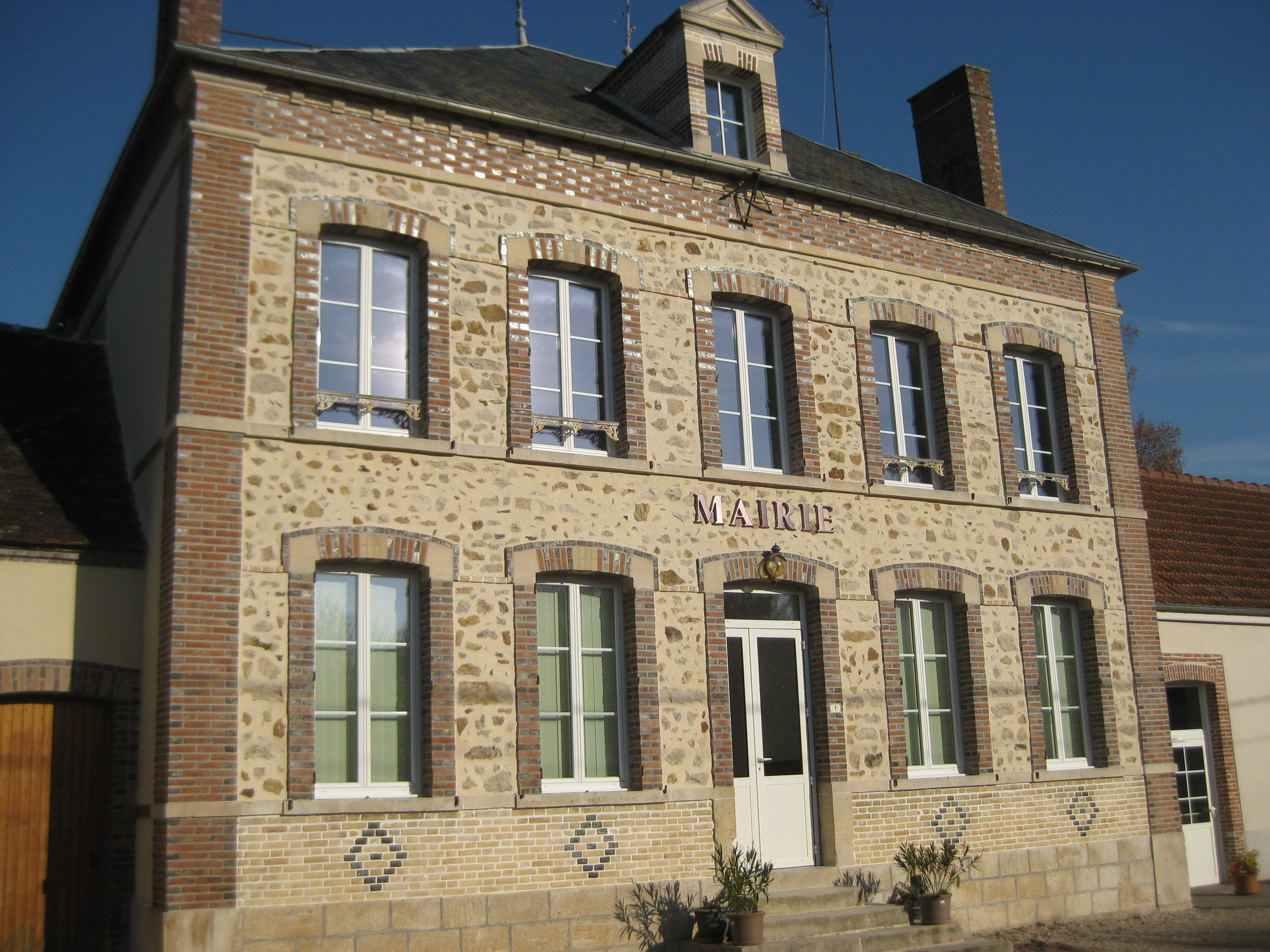
- The town hall in Trancault
- Location of Trancault
- Location within France Location within Grand Est
- Coordinates: 48°22′24″N 3°32′16″E
- Country: France
- Region: Grand Est
- Department: Aube
- Arrondissement: Nogent-sur-Seine
- Canton: Saint-Lyé
- Intercommunality: Orvin et Ardusson

Government
  - Mayor (2020–2026): Kévin Gravelle
- Area^{1}: 26.8 km^{2} (10.3 sq mi)
- Population (2023): 182
  - Density: 6.79/km^{2} (17.6/sq mi)
- Time zone: UTC+01:00 (CET)
  - Summer (DST): UTC+02:00 (CEST)
- INSEE/Postal code: 10383 /10290
- ^{1} French Land Register data, which excludes lakes, ponds, glaciers > 1 km^{2} (0.386 sq mi or 247 acres) and river estuaries.

Trancault (French pronunciation: [tʁɑ̃ko]) is a commune in the Aube department in north-central France.

== Population ==
Historical population
Year	Pop.	±% p.a.
1968	159	—
1975	190	+2.58%
1982	149	−3.41%
1990	165	+1.28%
1999	144	−1.50%
2007	206	+4.58%
2012	175	−3.21%
2017	186	+1.23%
2023	182	−0.36%
Source: INSEE

== See also ==
- Communes of the Aube department
