= Fontaine-Mâcon =

Commune in Grand Est, France

- Commune
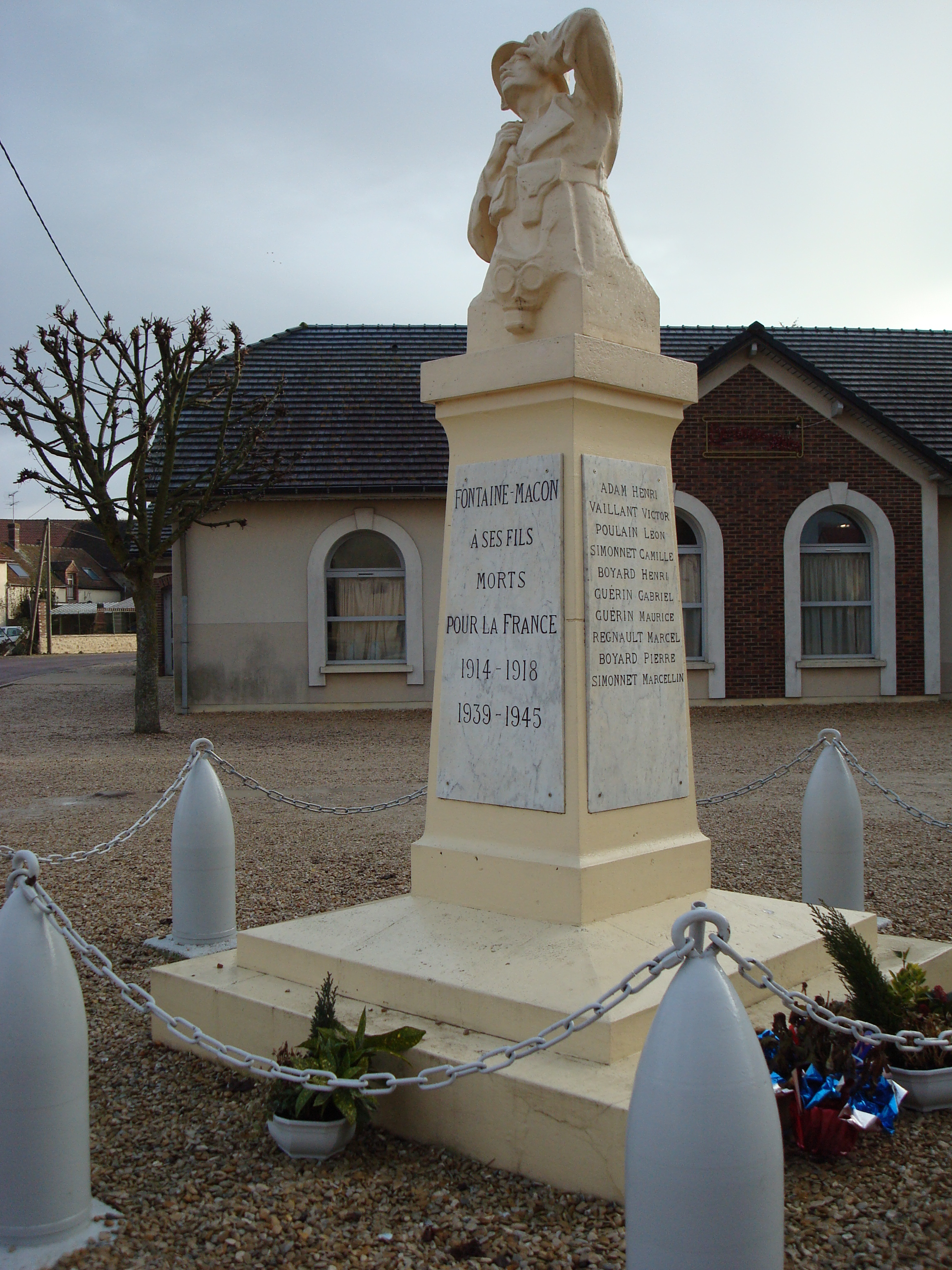
- War memorial
- Location of Fontaine-Mâcon
- Location within France Location within Grand Est
- Coordinates: 48°27′55″N 3°30′35″E
- Country: France
- Region: Grand Est
- Department: Aube
- Arrondissement: Nogent-sur-Seine
- Canton: Nogent-sur-Seine
- Intercommunality: Nogentais

Government
  - Mayor (2020–2026): Jean-Jacques Boynard
- Area^{1}: 16.01 km^{2} (6.18 sq mi)
- Elevation: 79 m (259 ft)
- Population (2023): 635
  - Density: 39.7/km^{2} (103/sq mi)
- Time zone: UTC+01:00 (CET)
  - Summer (DST): UTC+02:00 (CEST)
- INSEE/Postal code: 10153 /10400
- ^{1} French Land Register data, which excludes lakes, ponds, glaciers > 1 km^{2} (0.386 sq mi or 247 acres) and river estuaries.

Fontaine-Mâcon (French pronunciation: [fɔ̃tɛn makɔ̃]) is a commune in the Aube department in north-central France.

== Population ==
Historical population
Year	Pop.	±% p.a.
1968	359	—
1975	342	−0.69%
1982	392	+1.97%
1990	394	+0.06%
1999	425	+0.85%
2007	487	+1.72%
2012	645	+5.78%
2017	652	+0.22%
2023	635	−0.44%
Source: INSEE

== See also ==
- Communes of the Aube department
