= Canton of Creney-près-Troyes =

Coordinates: 48.34°N 4.13°E

- Canton
- Situation of the canton of Creney-près-Troyes in the department of Aube
- Country: France
- Region: Grand Est
- Department: Aube
- No. of communes: {{{nbcomm}}}
- Population (2023): 17,994
- INSEE code: 1006

The canton of Creney-près-Troyes is an administrative division of the Aube department, northeastern France. It was created at the French canton reorganisation which came into effect in March 2015. Its seat is in Creney-près-Troyes.

It consists of the following communes:

1. Bessy
2. Boulages
3. Champfleury
4. Chapelle-Vallon
5. Charny-le-Bachot
6. Châtres
7. Chauchigny
8. Creney-près-Troyes
9. Droupt-Saint-Basle
10. Droupt-Sainte-Marie
11. Étrelles-sur-Aube
12. Fontaine-les-Grès
13. Les Grandes-Chapelles
14. Lavau
15. Longueville-sur-Aube
16. Mergey
17. Méry-sur-Seine
18. Mesgrigny
19. Plancy-l'Abbaye
20. Prémierfait
21. Rhèges
22. Rilly-Sainte-Syre
23. Saint-Benoît-sur-Seine
24. Sainte-Maure
25. Saint-Mesmin
26. Saint-Oulph
27. Salon
28. Savières
29. Vailly
30. Vallant-Saint-Georges
31. Viâpres-le-Petit
32. Villacerf
33. Villechétif
