= Bessy, Aube =

Commune in Grand Est, France

Bessy
- Commune
- Location of Bessy
- Location within France Location within Grand Est
- Coordinates: 48°32′53″N 4°01′26″E
- Country: France
- Region: Grand Est
- Department: Aube
- Arrondissement: Nogent-sur-Seine
- Canton: Creney-près-Troyes

Government
  - Mayor (2020–2026): Jean-Marc Thomas
- Area^{1}: 7.03 km^{2} (2.71 sq mi)
- Elevation: 87 m (285 ft)
- Highest elevation: 109 m (358 ft)
- Lowest elevation: 80 m (260 ft)
- Population (2023): 111
  - Density: 15.8/km^{2} (40.9/sq mi)
- Time zone: UTC+01:00 (CET)
  - Summer (DST): UTC+02:00 (CEST)
- INSEE/Postal code: 10043 /10170
- ^{1} French Land Register data, which excludes lakes, ponds, glaciers > 1 km^{2} (0.386 sq mi or 247 acres) and river estuaries.

Bessy (French pronunciation: [bɛsi]) is a commune in the Aube department in north-central France that lies 43 km east of Nogent-sur-Seine.

== Population ==
Historical population
| Year | Pop. | ±% p.a. |
|---|---|---|
| 1968 | 115 | — |
| 1975 | 102 | −1.70% |
| 1982 | 103 | +0.14% |
| 1990 | 105 | +0.24% |
| 1999 | 122 | +1.68% |
| 2007 | 132 | +0.99% |
| 2012 | 126 | −0.93% |
| 2017 | 140 | +2.13% |
| 2023 | 111 | −3.79% |
Source: INSEE

== See also ==
- Communes of the Aube department
