= Champfleury, Aube =

Commune in Grand Est, France

Champfleury
- Commune
- Location of Champfleury
- Location within France Location within Grand Est
- Coordinates: 48°37′03″N 4°00′25″E
- Country: France
- Region: Grand Est
- Department: Aube
- Arrondissement: Nogent-sur-Seine
- Canton: Creney-près-Troyes

Government
  - Mayor (2020–2026): Alain Ployez
- Area^{1}: 17.98 km^{2} (6.94 sq mi)
- Elevation: 119 m (390 ft)
- Highest elevation: 154 m (505 ft)
- Lowest elevation: 88 m (289 ft)
- Population (2023): 110
  - Density: 6.1/km^{2} (16/sq mi)
- Time zone: UTC+01:00 (CET)
  - Summer (DST): UTC+02:00 (CEST)
- INSEE/Postal code: 10075 /10700
- ^{1} French Land Register data, which excludes lakes, ponds, glaciers > 1 km^{2} (0.386 sq mi or 247 acres) and river estuaries.

Champfleury (French pronunciation: [ʃɑ̃fløʁi]) is a commune in the Aube department in north-eastern France.

== Population ==
Historical population
Year	Pop.	±% p.a.
1968	180	—
1975	156	−2.02%
1982	133	−2.25%
1990	130	−0.28%
1999	125	−0.43%
2007	158	+2.97%
2012	135	−3.10%
2017	102	−5.45%
2023	110	+1.27%
Source: INSEE

== See also ==
- Communes of the Aube department
