= Étrelles-sur-Aube =

Commune in Grand Est, France

- Commune
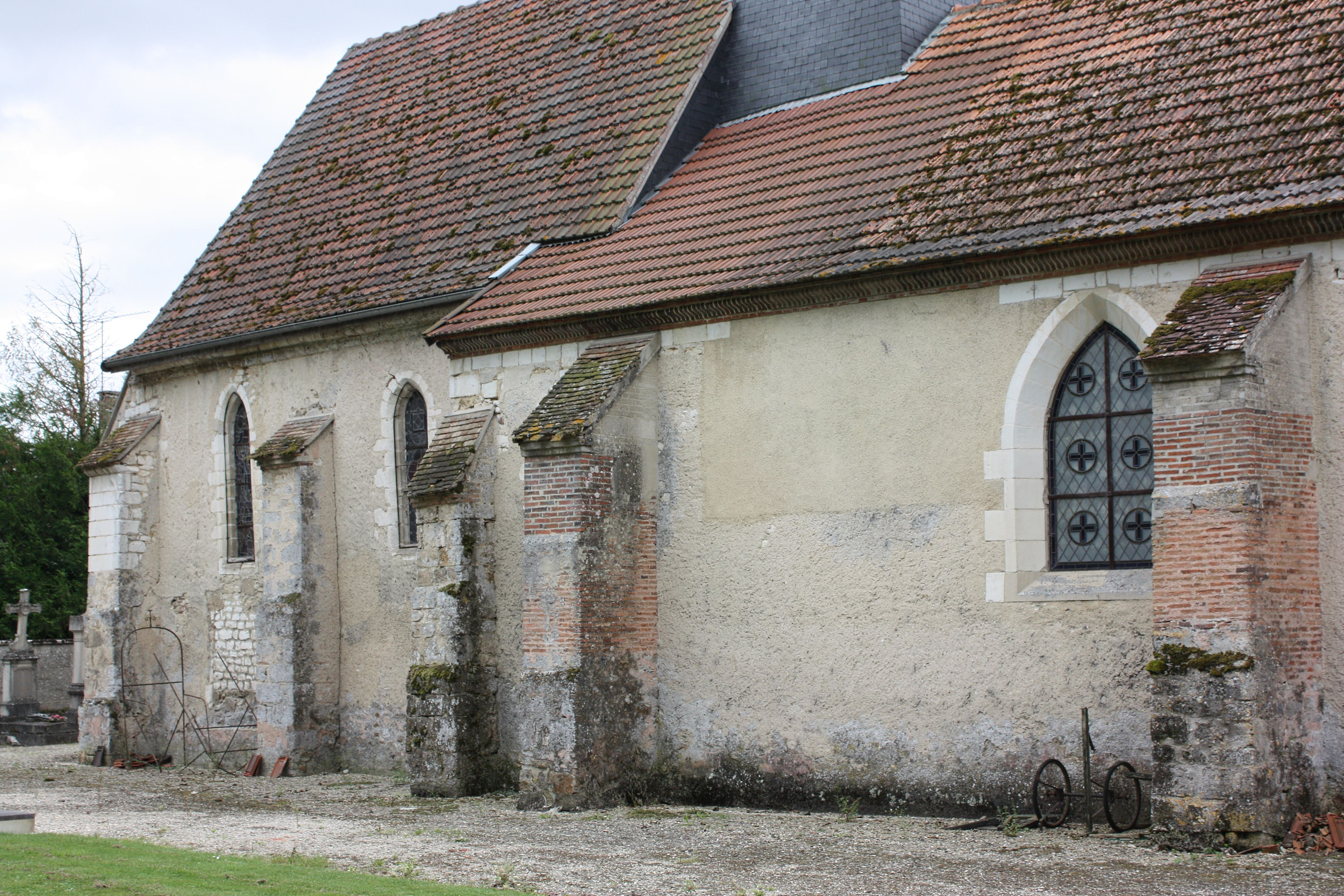
- The church in Étrelles-sur-Aube
- Location of Étrelles-sur-Aube
- Location within France Location within Grand Est
- Coordinates: 48°33′39″N 3°52′22″E
- Country: France
- Region: Grand Est
- Department: Aube
- Arrondissement: Nogent-sur-Seine
- Canton: Creney-près-Troyes

Government
  - Mayor (2020–2026): Gilbert Mallet
- Area^{1}: 10.43 km^{2} (4.03 sq mi)
- Elevation: 78 m (256 ft)
- Population (2023): 158
  - Density: 15.1/km^{2} (39.2/sq mi)
- Time zone: UTC+01:00 (CET)
  - Summer (DST): UTC+02:00 (CEST)
- INSEE/Postal code: 10144 /10170
- ^{1} French Land Register data, which excludes lakes, ponds, glaciers > 1 km^{2} (0.386 sq mi or 247 acres) and river estuaries.

Étrelles-sur-Aube (French pronunciation: [etʁɛl syʁ ob], literally Étrelles on Aube) is a commune in the Aube department in north-central France.

== Population ==
Historical population
Year	Pop.	±% p.a.
1968	140	—
1975	127	−1.38%
1982	147	+2.11%
1990	132	−1.34%
1999	125	−0.60%
2007	129	+0.39%
2012	149	+2.92%
2017	155	+0.79%
2023	158	+0.32%
Source: INSEE

== See also ==
- Communes of the Aube department
