= Chapelle-Vallon =

Commune in Grand Est, France

- Commune
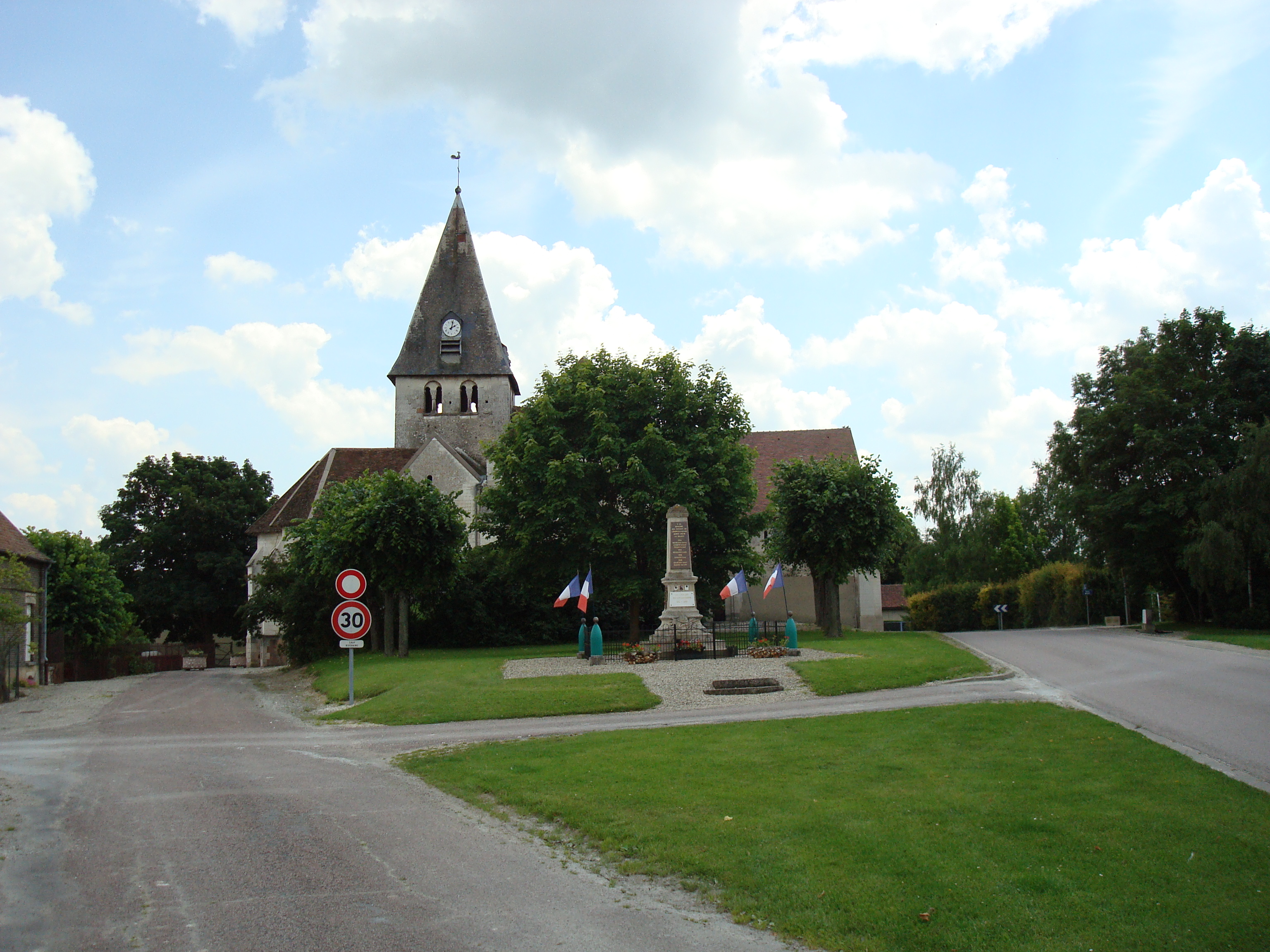
- The church in Chapelle-Vallon
- Location of Chapelle-Vallon
- Location within France Location within Grand Est
- Coordinates: 48°26′11″N 4°02′27″E
- Country: France
- Region: Grand Est
- Department: Aube
- Arrondissement: Nogent-sur-Seine
- Canton: Creney-près-Troyes

Government
  - Mayor (2023–2026): Guylène Bouchot
- Area^{1}: 19.24 km^{2} (7.43 sq mi)
- Elevation: 193 m (633 ft)
- Population (2023): 232
  - Density: 12.1/km^{2} (31.2/sq mi)
- Time zone: UTC+01:00 (CET)
  - Summer (DST): UTC+02:00 (CEST)
- INSEE/Postal code: 10082 /10700
- ^{1} French Land Register data, which excludes lakes, ponds, glaciers > 1 km^{2} (0.386 sq mi or 247 acres) and river estuaries.

Chapelle-Vallon (French pronunciation: [ʃapɛl valɔ̃]) is a commune in the Aube department in north-central France.

== Population ==
Historical population
Year	Pop.	±% p.a.
1968	176	—
1975	165	−0.92%
1982	162	−0.26%
1990	186	+1.74%
1999	196	+0.58%
2007	192	−0.26%
2012	244	+4.91%
2017	243	−0.08%
2023	232	−0.77%
Source: INSEE

== See also ==
- Communes of the Aube department
