= Charny-le-Bachot =

Commune in Grand Est, France

- Commune
- Location of Charny-le-Bachot
- Location within France Location within Grand Est
- Coordinates: 48°33′13″N 3°56′41″E
- Country: France
- Region: Grand Est
- Department: Aube
- Arrondissement: Nogent-sur-Seine
- Canton: Creney-près-Troyes

Government
  - Mayor (2020–2026): Delphine Rempenaux
- Area^{1}: 13.64 km^{2} (5.27 sq mi)
- Elevation: 85 m (279 ft)
- Highest elevation: 117 m (384 ft)
- Lowest elevation: 76 m (249 ft)
- Population (2023): 239
  - Density: 17.5/km^{2} (45.4/sq mi)
- Time zone: UTC+01:00 (CET)
  - Summer (DST): UTC+02:00 (CEST)
- INSEE/Postal code: 10086 /10380
- ^{1} French Land Register data, which excludes lakes, ponds, glaciers > 1 km^{2} (0.386 sq mi or 247 acres) and river estuaries.

Charny-le-Bachot (French pronunciation: [ʃaʁni lə baʃo]) is a commune in the Aube department in north-central France.

== Population ==
Historical population
Year	Pop.	±% p.a.
1968	177	—
1975	153	−2.06%
1982	169	+1.43%
1990	161	−0.60%
1999	173	+0.80%
2007	172	−0.07%
2012	228	+5.80%
2017	258	+2.50%
2023	239	−1.27%
Source: INSEE

== See also ==
- Communes of the Aube department
