= Fontaine-les-Grès =

Commune in Grand Est, France

- Commune
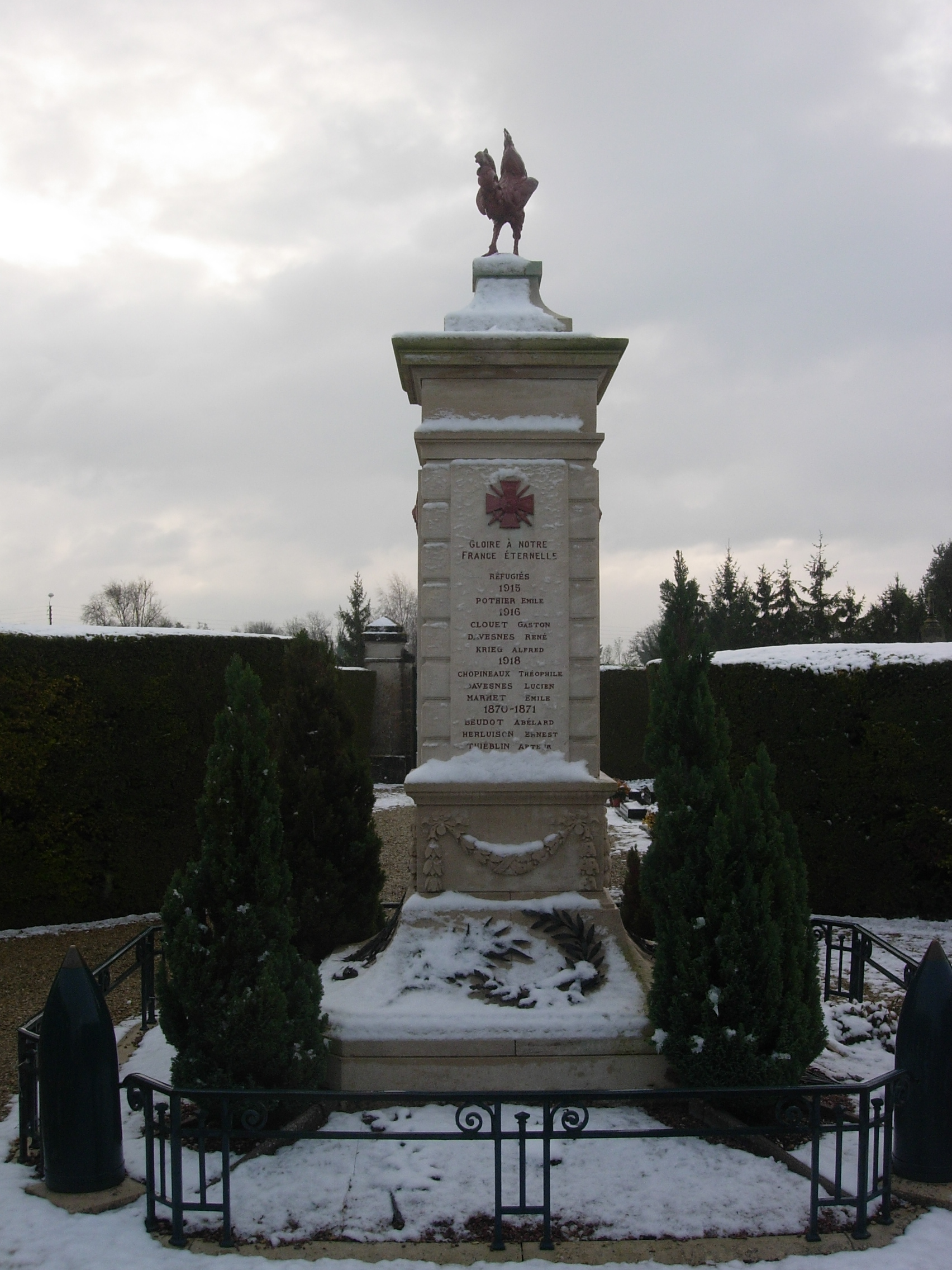
- War memorial
- Location of Fontaine-les-Grès
- Location within France Location within Grand Est
- Coordinates: 48°25′28″N 3°54′32″E
- Country: France
- Region: Grand Est
- Department: Aube
- Arrondissement: Nogent-sur-Seine
- Canton: Creney-près-Troyes

Government
  - Mayor (2020–2026): Ludovic Vallarcher
- Area^{1}: 12.16 km^{2} (4.70 sq mi)
- Elevation: 98 m (322 ft)
- Population (2023): 914
  - Density: 75.2/km^{2} (195/sq mi)
- Time zone: UTC+01:00 (CET)
  - Summer (DST): UTC+02:00 (CEST)
- INSEE/Postal code: 10151 /10280
- ^{1} French Land Register data, which excludes lakes, ponds, glaciers > 1 km^{2} (0.386 sq mi or 247 acres) and river estuaries.

Fontaine-les-Grès (French pronunciation: [fɔ̃tɛn le ɡʁɛ]) is a commune in the Aube department in north-central France.

== Population ==
Historical population
Year	Pop.	±% p.a.
1968	891	—
1975	846	−0.74%
1982	863	+0.28%
1990	915	+0.73%
1999	905	−0.12%
2007	891	−0.19%
2012	874	−0.38%
2017	876	+0.05%
2023	914	+0.71%
Source: INSEE

== See also ==
- Communes of the Aube department
