= Savières =

Commune in Grand Est, France

- Commune
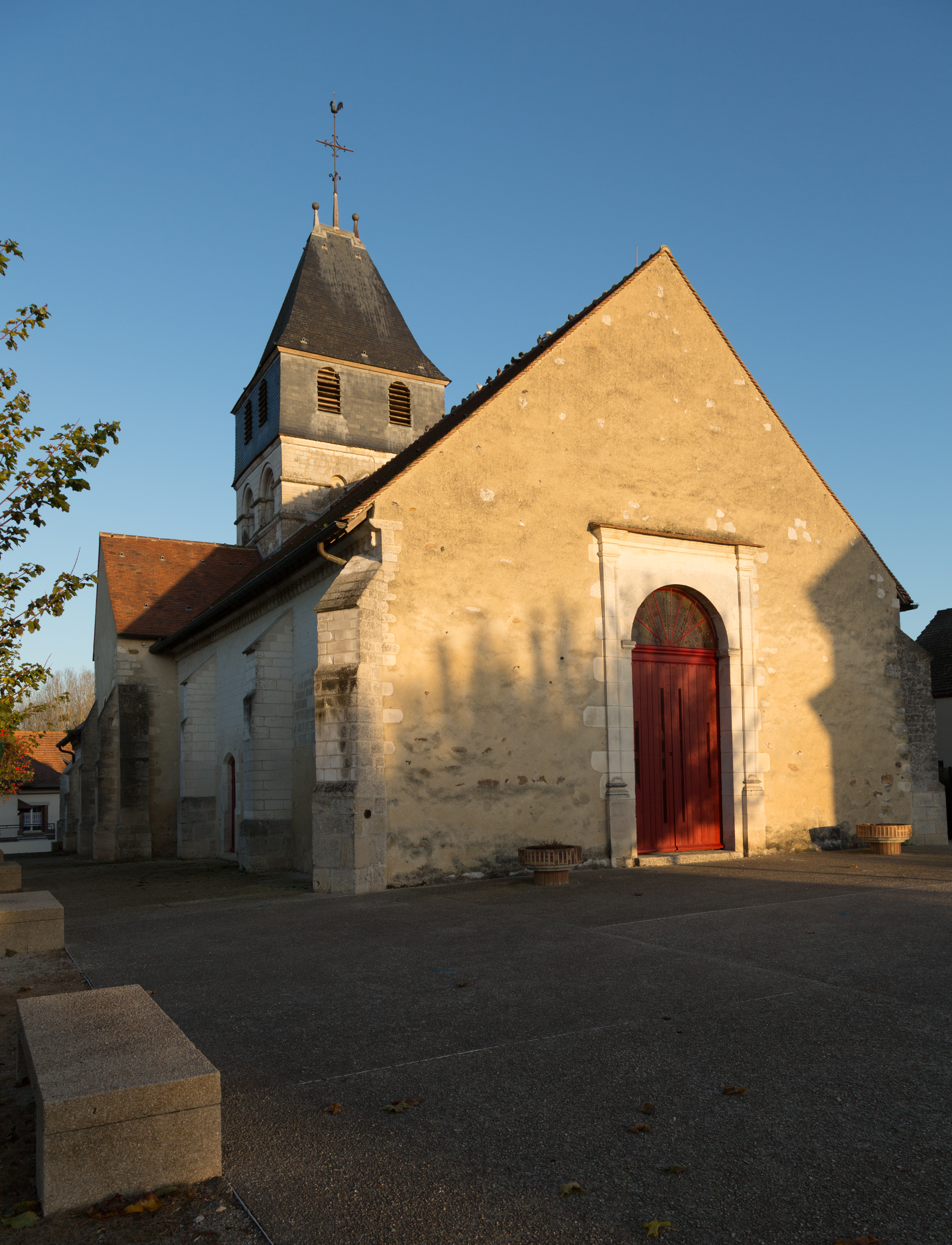
- The church in Savières
- Location of Savières
- Location within France Location within Grand Est
- Coordinates: 48°24′29″N 3°57′09″E
- Country: France
- Region: Grand Est
- Department: Aube
- Arrondissement: Nogent-sur-Seine
- Canton: Creney-près-Troyes

Government
  - Mayor (2024–2026): Eric Lagoguey
- Area^{1}: 18.54 km^{2} (7.16 sq mi)
- Elevation: 95 m (312 ft)
- Highest elevation: 139 m (456 ft)
- Lowest elevation: 88 m (289 ft)
- Population (2023): 1,085
  - Density: 58.52/km^{2} (151.6/sq mi)
- Time zone: UTC+01:00 (CET)
  - Summer (DST): UTC+02:00 (CEST)
- INSEE/Postal code: 10368 /10600
- ^{1} French Land Register data, which excludes lakes, ponds, glaciers > 1 km^{2} (0.386 sq mi or 247 acres) and river estuaries.

Savières (French pronunciation: [savjɛʁ]) is a commune in the Aube department in north-central France.

== Population ==
Historical population
Year	Pop.	±% p.a.
1968	619	—
1975	684	+1.44%
1982	707	+0.47%
1990	941	+3.64%
1999	952	+0.13%
2007	898	−0.73%
2012	1,033	+2.84%
2017	1,005	−0.55%
2023	1,085	+1.28%
Source: INSEE

== See also ==
- Communes of the Aube department
