= Fay-lès-Marcilly =

Commune in Grand Est, France

- Commune
- Location of Fay-lès-Marcilly
- Location within France Location within Grand Est
- Coordinates: 48°24′13″N 3°36′12″E
- Country: France
- Region: Grand Est
- Department: Aube
- Arrondissement: Nogent-sur-Seine
- Canton: Saint-Lyé
- Intercommunality: Orvin et Ardusson

Government
  - Mayor (2020–2026): Jérémy Flogny
- Area^{1}: 5.76 km^{2} (2.22 sq mi)
- Elevation: 162 m (531 ft)
- Population (2023): 80
  - Density: 14/km^{2} (36/sq mi)
- Time zone: UTC+01:00 (CET)
  - Summer (DST): UTC+02:00 (CEST)
- INSEE/Postal code: 10146 /10290
- ^{1} French Land Register data, which excludes lakes, ponds, glaciers > 1 km^{2} (0.386 sq mi or 247 acres) and river estuaries.

Fay-lès-Marcilly (French pronunciation: [fɛ lɛ maʁsiji]) is a commune in the Aube department in north-central France.

== Population ==
Historical population
Year	Pop.	±% p.a.
1968	98	—
1975	84	−2.18%
1982	62	−4.25%
1990	79	+3.08%
1999	85	+0.82%
2007	104	+2.55%
2012	91	−2.64%
2017	87	−0.89%
2023	80	−1.39%
Source: INSEE

== See also ==
- Communes of the Aube department
