= Rilly-Sainte-Syre =

Commune in Grand Est, France

- Commune
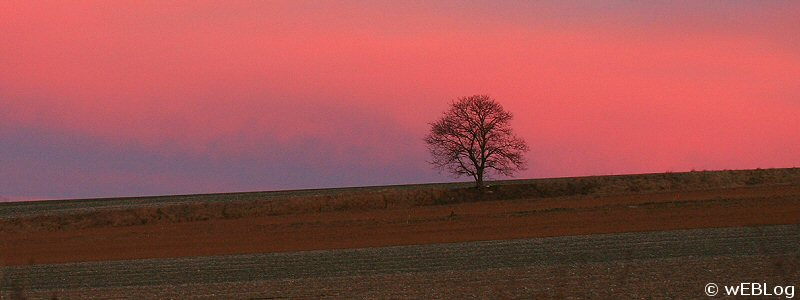
- Sunset in Rilly-Sainte-Syre

- Coat of arms
- Location of Rilly-Sainte-Syre
- Location within France Location within Grand Est
- Coordinates: 48°26′41″N 3°57′30″E
- Country: France
- Region: Grand Est
- Department: Aube
- Arrondissement: Nogent-sur-Seine
- Canton: Creney-près-Troyes

Government
  - Mayor (2020–2026): Jean-Christophe Crombez
- Area^{1}: 14.16 km^{2} (5.47 sq mi)
- Elevation: 160 m (520 ft)
- Population (2023): 231
  - Density: 16.3/km^{2} (42.3/sq mi)
- Time zone: UTC+01:00 (CET)
  - Summer (DST): UTC+02:00 (CEST)
- INSEE/Postal code: 10320 /10280
- ^{1} French Land Register data, which excludes lakes, ponds, glaciers > 1 km^{2} (0.386 sq mi or 247 acres) and river estuaries.

Rilly-Sainte-Syre is a commune in the Aube department in north-central France.

== Population ==
Historical population
Year	Pop.	±% p.a.
1968	218	—
1975	228	+0.64%
1982	230	+0.12%
1990	242	+0.64%
1999	216	−1.25%
2007	246	+1.64%
2012	239	−0.58%
2017	233	−0.51%
2023	231	−0.14%
Source: INSEE

== See also ==
- Communes of the Aube department
