= Prémierfait =

Commune in Grand Est, France

- Commune
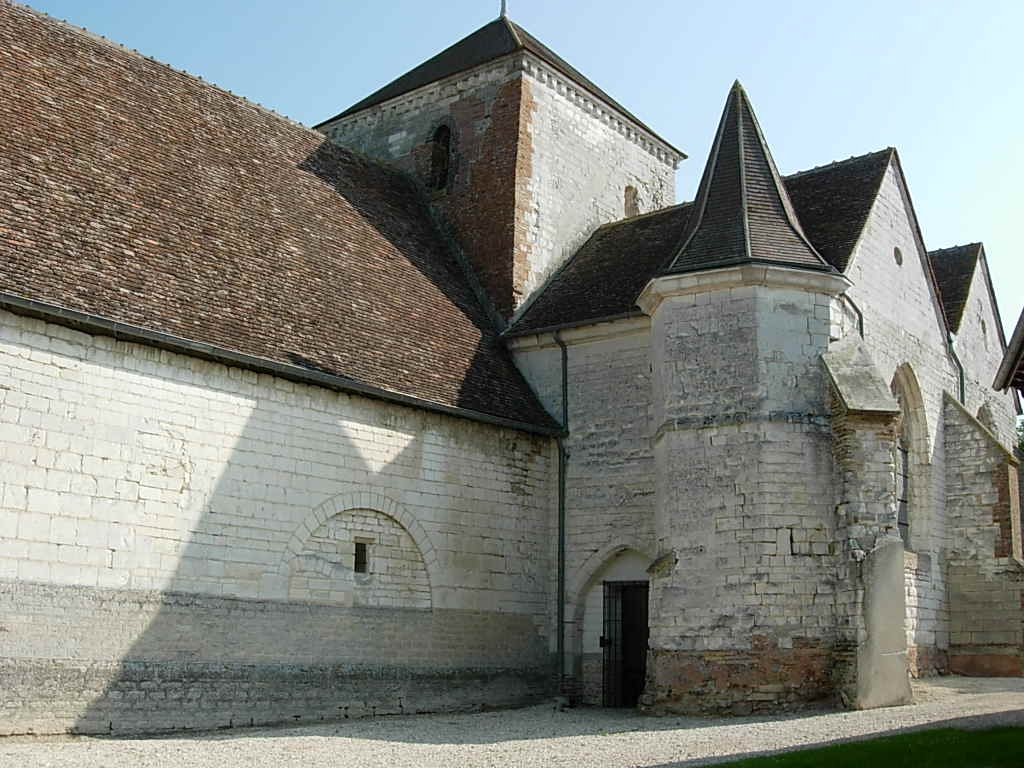
- The church in Prémierfait
- Location of Prémierfait
- Location within France Location within Grand Est
- Coordinates: 48°30′12″N 4°01′42″E
- Country: France
- Region: Grand Est
- Department: Aube
- Arrondissement: Nogent-sur-Seine
- Canton: Creney-près-Troyes

Government
  - Mayor (2020–2026): Alain Vincent
- Area^{1}: 14.79 km^{2} (5.71 sq mi)
- Elevation: 128 m (420 ft)
- Population (2023): 90
  - Density: 6.1/km^{2} (16/sq mi)
- Time zone: UTC+01:00 (CET)
  - Summer (DST): UTC+02:00 (CEST)
- INSEE/Postal code: 10305 /10170
- ^{1} French Land Register data, which excludes lakes, ponds, glaciers > 1 km^{2} (0.386 sq mi or 247 acres) and river estuaries.

Prémierfait is a commune in the Aube department in north-central France.

== Population ==
Historical population
Year	Pop.	±% p.a.
1968	108	—
1975	87	−3.04%
1982	88	+0.16%
1990	85	−0.43%
1999	73	−1.68%
2007	103	+4.40%
2012	102	−0.19%
2017	88	−2.91%
2023	90	+0.38%
Source: INSEE

== See also ==
- Communes of the Aube department
