= Salon, Aube =

Commune in Grand Est, France

Salon
- Commune
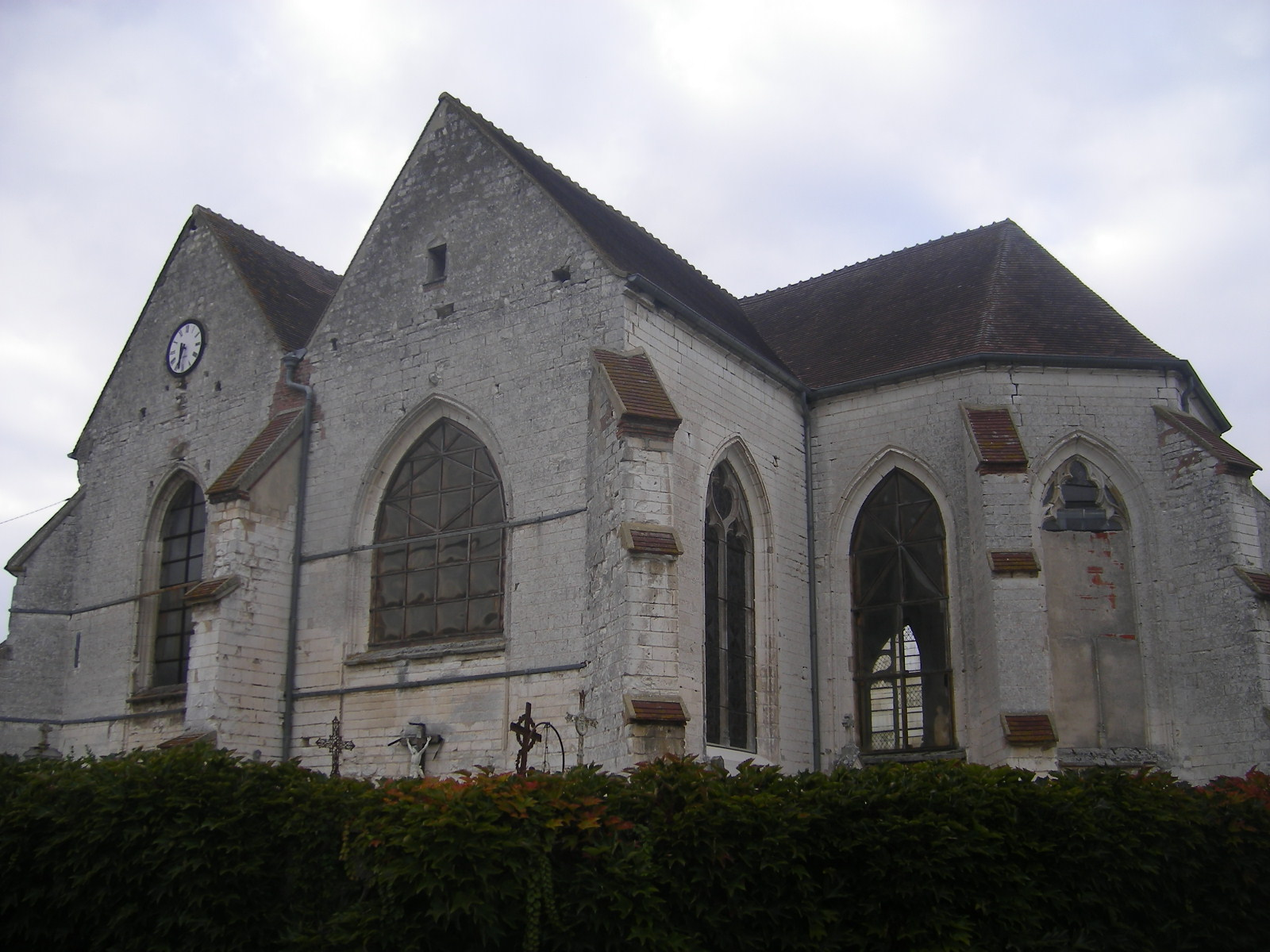
- The church in Salon
- Location of Salon
- Location within France Location within Grand Est
- Coordinates: 48°38′27″N 4°00′16″E
- Country: France
- Region: Grand Est
- Department: Aube
- Arrondissement: Nogent-sur-Seine
- Canton: Creney-près-Troyes

Government
  - Mayor (2020–2026): Philippe Gugger
- Area^{1}: 21.67 km^{2} (8.37 sq mi)
- Elevation: 109 m (358 ft)
- Highest elevation: 152 m (499 ft)
- Lowest elevation: 99 m (325 ft)
- Population (2023): 129
  - Density: 5.95/km^{2} (15.4/sq mi)
- Time zone: UTC+01:00 (CET)
  - Summer (DST): UTC+02:00 (CEST)
- INSEE/Postal code: 10365 /10700
- ^{1} French Land Register data, which excludes lakes, ponds, glaciers > 1 km^{2} (0.386 sq mi or 247 acres) and river estuaries.

Salon (French pronunciation: [salɔ̃]) is a commune in the Aube department, north-central France.

== Population ==
Historical population
Year	Pop.	±% p.a.
1968	193	—
1975	174	−1.47%
1982	154	−1.73%
1990	153	−0.08%
1999	156	+0.22%
2007	150	−0.49%
2012	148	−0.27%
2017	120	−4.11%
2023	129	+1.21%
Source: INSEE

== See also ==
- Communes of the Aube department
