= Saint-Benoît-sur-Seine =

Commune in Grand Est, France

- Commune
- Location of Saint-Benoît-sur-Seine
- Location within France Location within Grand Est
- Coordinates: 48°22′14″N 4°01′49″E
- Country: France
- Region: Grand Est
- Department: Aube
- Arrondissement: Troyes
- Canton: Creney-près-Troyes
- Intercommunality: CA Troyes Champagne Métropole

Government
  - Mayor (2020–2026): Jean-François Meirhaeghe
- Area^{1}: 11.78 km^{2} (4.55 sq mi)
- Elevation: 103 m (338 ft)
- Population (2023): 455
  - Density: 38.6/km^{2} (100/sq mi)
- Time zone: UTC+01:00 (CET)
  - Summer (DST): UTC+02:00 (CEST)
- INSEE/Postal code: 10336 /10180
- ^{1} French Land Register data, which excludes lakes, ponds, glaciers > 1 km^{2} (0.386 sq mi or 247 acres) and river estuaries.

Saint-Benoît-sur-Seine (French pronunciation: [sɛ̃ bənwa syʁ sɛn], literally Saint-Benoît on Seine) is a commune in the Aube department in north-central France.

== Population ==
Historical population
Year	Pop.	±% p.a.
1968	239	—
1975	240	+0.06%
1982	292	+2.84%
1990	328	+1.46%
1999	401	+2.26%
2007	400	−0.03%
2012	405	+0.25%
2017	400	−0.25%
2023	455	+2.17%
Source: INSEE

== See also ==
- Communes of the Aube department
