= Canton of Romilly-sur-Seine-2 =

Coordinates: 48°31′10″N 3°43′35″E

Romilly-sur-Seine-2
- Former canton
- Interactive map of Romilly-sur-Seine-2
- Country: France
- Region: Grand Est
- Department: Aube
- No. of communes: {{{nbcomm}}}
- Disbanded: 2015
- Population (2012): 10,921

The Canton of Romilly-sur-Seine-2 is a former canton of the arrondissement of Nogent-sur-Seine, in the Aube department, in northern France. It had 10,921 inhabitants (2012). It was disbanded following the French canton reorganisation which came into effect in March 2015. It covered part of the commune Romilly-sur-Seine.
