= Viâpres-le-Petit =

Commune in Grand Est, France

- Commune
- Coat of arms
- Location of Viâpres-le-Petit
- Location within France Location within Grand Est
- Coordinates: 48°33′48″N 4°02′35″E
- Country: France
- Region: Grand Est
- Department: Aube
- Arrondissement: Nogent-sur-Seine
- Canton: Creney-près-Troyes

Government
  - Mayor (2020–2026): Patrick Gombault
- Area^{1}: 11.13 km^{2} (4.30 sq mi)
- Elevation: 85 m (279 ft)
- Population (2023): 119
  - Density: 10.7/km^{2} (27.7/sq mi)
- Time zone: UTC+01:00 (CET)
  - Summer (DST): UTC+02:00 (CEST)
- INSEE/Postal code: 10408 /10380
- ^{1} French Land Register data, which excludes lakes, ponds, glaciers > 1 km^{2} (0.386 sq mi or 247 acres) and river estuaries.

Viâpres-le-Petit (French pronunciation: [vjapʁ lə pəti]) is a commune in the Aube department in north-central France.

== Population ==
Historical population
Year	Pop.	±% p.a.
1968	95	—
1975	106	+1.58%
1982	96	−1.41%
1990	93	−0.40%
1999	107	+1.57%
2007	123	+1.76%
2012	119	−0.66%
2017	126	+1.15%
2023	119	−0.95%
Source: INSEE

== See also ==
- Communes of the Aube department
