= Villechétif =

Commune in Grand Est, France

- Commune
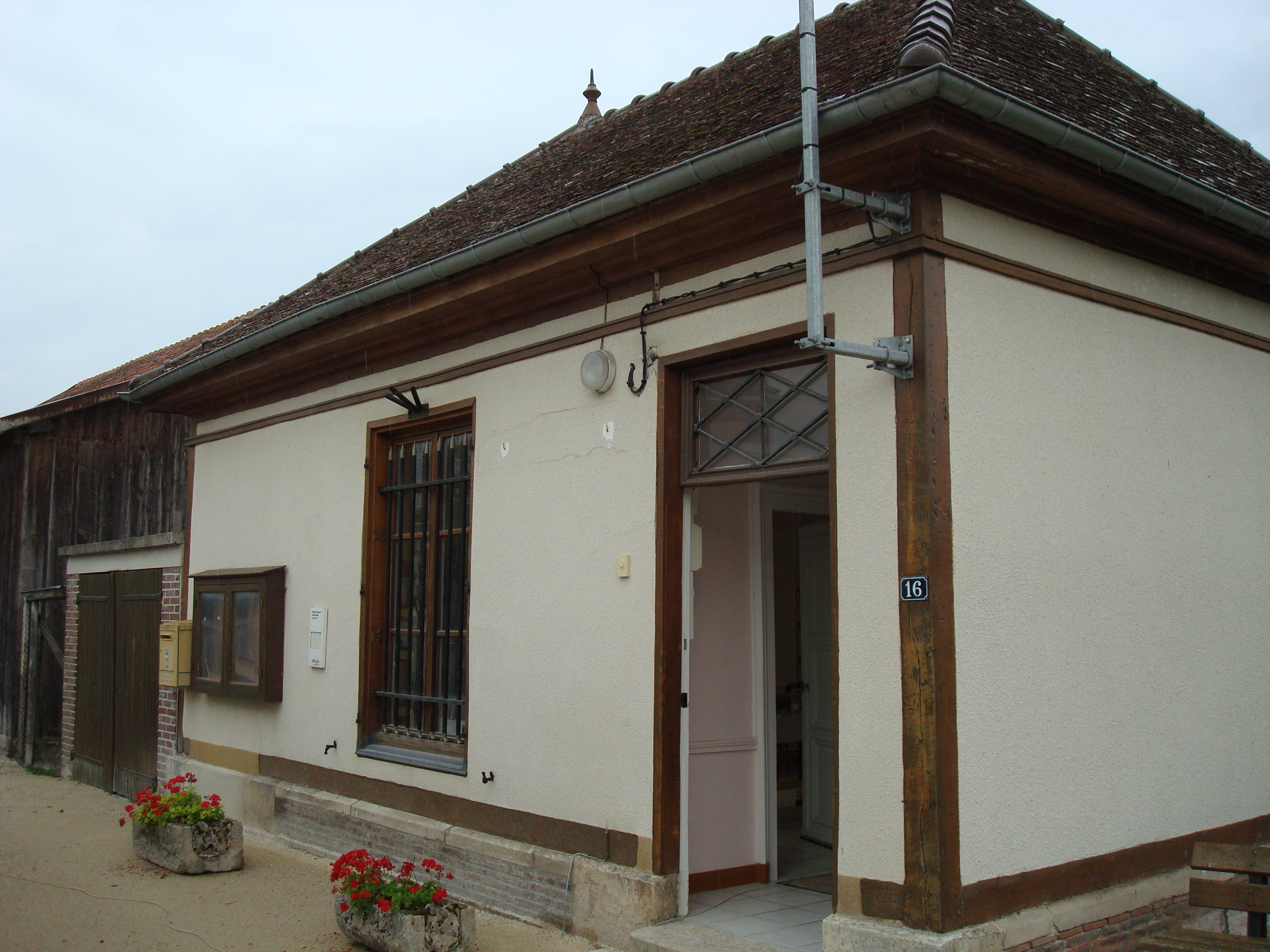
- Town hall
- Location of Villechétif
- Location within France Location within Grand Est
- Coordinates: 48°18′43″N 4°08′45″E
- Country: France
- Region: Grand Est
- Department: Aube
- Arrondissement: Troyes
- Canton: Creney-près-Troyes
- Intercommunality: CA Troyes Champagne Métropole

Government
  - Mayor (2022–2026): Christelle Thiebaux
- Area^{1}: 12.24 km^{2} (4.73 sq mi)
- Elevation: 121 m (397 ft)
- Population (2023): 947
  - Density: 77.4/km^{2} (200/sq mi)
- Time zone: UTC+01:00 (CET)
  - Summer (DST): UTC+02:00 (CEST)
- INSEE/Postal code: 10412 /10410
- ^{1} French Land Register data, which excludes lakes, ponds, glaciers > 1 km^{2} (0.386 sq mi or 247 acres) and river estuaries.

Villechétif (French pronunciation: [vilʃetif]) is a commune in the Aube department in north-central France.

== Population ==
Historical population
| Year | Pop. | ±% p.a. |
|---|---|---|
| 1968 | 269 | — |
| 1975 | 475 | +8.46% |
| 1982 | 707 | +5.85% |
| 1990 | 633 | −1.37% |
| 1999 | 667 | +0.58% |
| 2007 | 774 | +1.88% |
| 2012 | 958 | +4.36% |
| 2017 | 927 | −0.66% |
| 2023 | 947 | +0.36% |
Source: INSEE

== See also ==
- Communes of the Aube department
