= Boulages =

Commune in Grand Est, France

- Commune
- Location of Boulages
- Location within France Location within Grand Est
- Coordinates: 48°34′44″N 3°54′56″E
- Country: France
- Region: Grand Est
- Department: Aube
- Arrondissement: Nogent-sur-Seine
- Canton: Creney-près-Troyes

Government
  - Mayor (2020–2026): Fabienne Godot
- Area^{1}: 11.54 km^{2} (4.46 sq mi)
- Elevation: 83 m (272 ft)
- Population (2023): 224
  - Density: 19.4/km^{2} (50.3/sq mi)
- Time zone: UTC+01:00 (CET)
  - Summer (DST): UTC+02:00 (CEST)
- INSEE/Postal code: 10052 /10380
- ^{1} French Land Register data, which excludes lakes, ponds, glaciers > 1 km^{2} (0.386 sq mi or 247 acres) and river estuaries.

Boulages (French pronunciation: [bulaʒ]) is a commune in the Aube department in north-central France.

== Population ==
Historical population
Year	Pop.	±% p.a.
1968	243	—
1975	210	−2.06%
1982	225	+0.99%
1990	204	−1.22%
1999	221	+0.89%
2007	230	+0.50%
2012	251	+1.76%
2017	221	−2.51%
2023	224	+0.22%
Source: INSEE

== See also ==
- Communes of the Aube department
