= Villadin =

Commune in Grand Est, France

- Commune
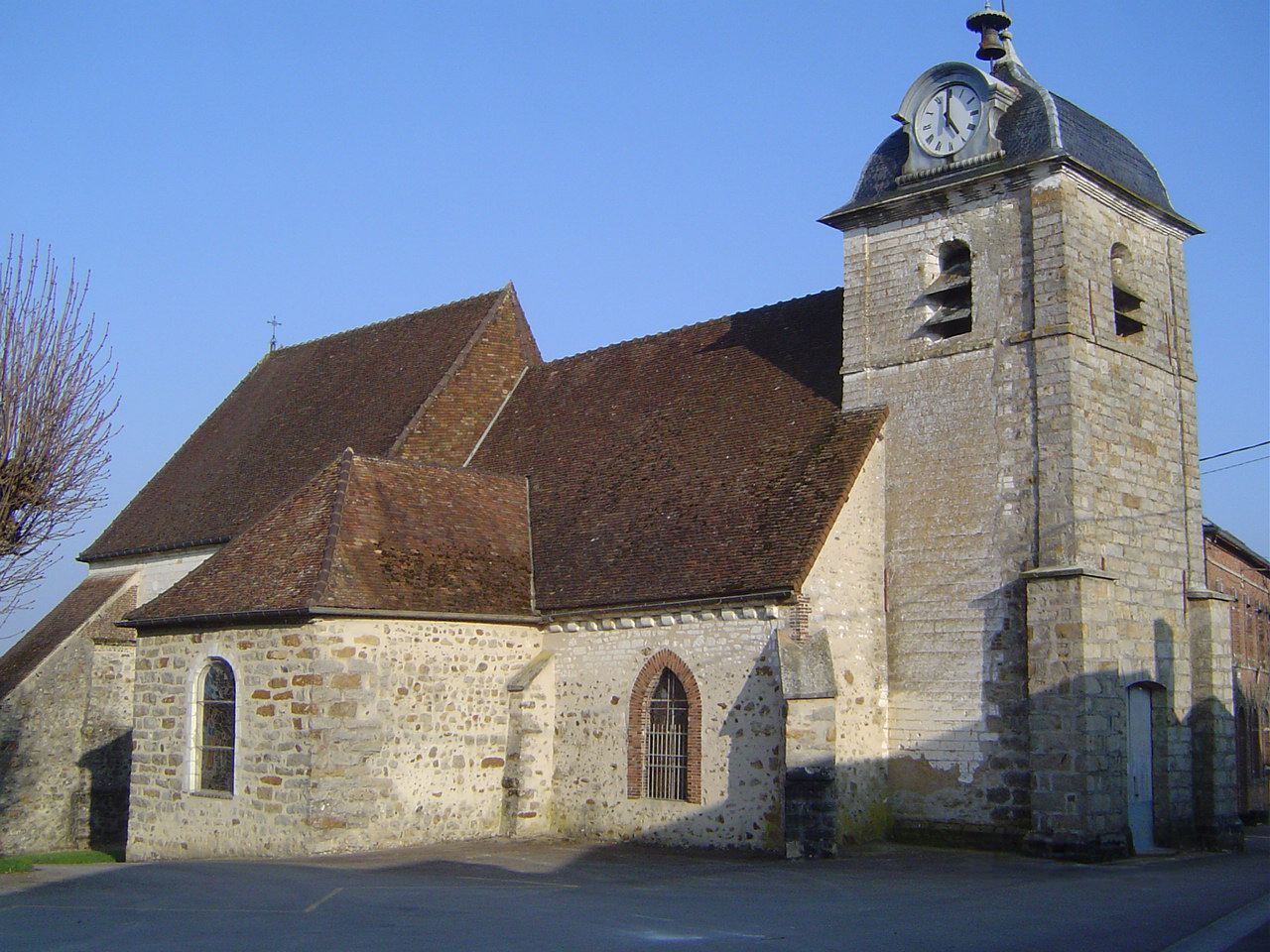
- The church in Villadin

- Coat of arms
- Location of Villadin
- Location within France Location within Grand Est
- Coordinates: 48°19′06″N 3°40′53″E
- Country: France
- Region: Grand Est
- Department: Aube
- Arrondissement: Nogent-sur-Seine
- Canton: Saint-Lyé
- Intercommunality: Orvin et Ardusson

Government
  - Mayor (2020–2026): Claude Tenneguin
- Area^{1}: 12.35 km^{2} (4.77 sq mi)
- Elevation: 195 m (640 ft)
- Population (2023): 108
  - Density: 8.74/km^{2} (22.6/sq mi)
- Time zone: UTC+01:00 (CET)
  - Summer (DST): UTC+02:00 (CEST)
- INSEE/Postal code: 10410 /10290
- ^{1} French Land Register data, which excludes lakes, ponds, glaciers > 1 km^{2} (0.386 sq mi or 247 acres) and river estuaries.

Villadin is a commune in the Aube department in north-central France.

== Population ==
Historical population
Year	Pop.	±% p.a.
1968	152	—
1975	123	−2.98%
1982	121	−0.23%
1990	102	−2.11%
1999	134	+3.08%
2007	137	+0.28%
2012	126	−1.66%
2017	112	−2.33%
2023	108	−0.60%
Source: INSEE

== See also ==
- Communes of the Aube department
