= Mesgrigny =

Commune in Grand Est, France

- Commune
- Location of Mesgrigny
- Location within France Location within Grand Est
- Coordinates: 48°29′15″N 3°53′00″E
- Country: France
- Region: Grand Est
- Department: Aube
- Arrondissement: Nogent-sur-Seine
- Canton: Creney-près-Troyes

Government
  - Mayor (2020–2026): Ludovic Bouniol
- Area^{1}: 7.27 km^{2} (2.81 sq mi)
- Elevation: 90 m (300 ft)
- Population (2023): 255
  - Density: 35.1/km^{2} (90.8/sq mi)
- Time zone: UTC+01:00 (CET)
  - Summer (DST): UTC+02:00 (CEST)
- INSEE/Postal code: 10234 /10170
- ^{1} French Land Register data, which excludes lakes, ponds, glaciers > 1 km^{2} (0.386 sq mi or 247 acres) and river estuaries.

Mesgrigny (French pronunciation: [megʁiɲi]) is a commune in the Aube department in north-central France. It is a small village located in the canton of Creney-près-Troyes and the arrondissement of Nogent-sur-Seine. The nearest towns are Romilly-sur-Seine (12 km to the west) and Troyes (25 km to the southeast).

== Population ==
Historical population
| Year | Pop. | ±% p.a. |
|---|---|---|
| 1968 | 184 | — |
| 1975 | 132 | −4.63% |
| 1982 | 188 | +5.18% |
| 1990 | 225 | +2.27% |
| 1999 | 214 | −0.56% |
| 2007 | 231 | +0.96% |
| 2012 | 290 | +4.65% |
| 2017 | 292 | +0.14% |
| 2023 | 255 | −2.23% |
Source: INSEE

== See also ==
- Communes of the Aube department
