= Prunay-Belleville =

Commune in Grand Est, France

- Commune
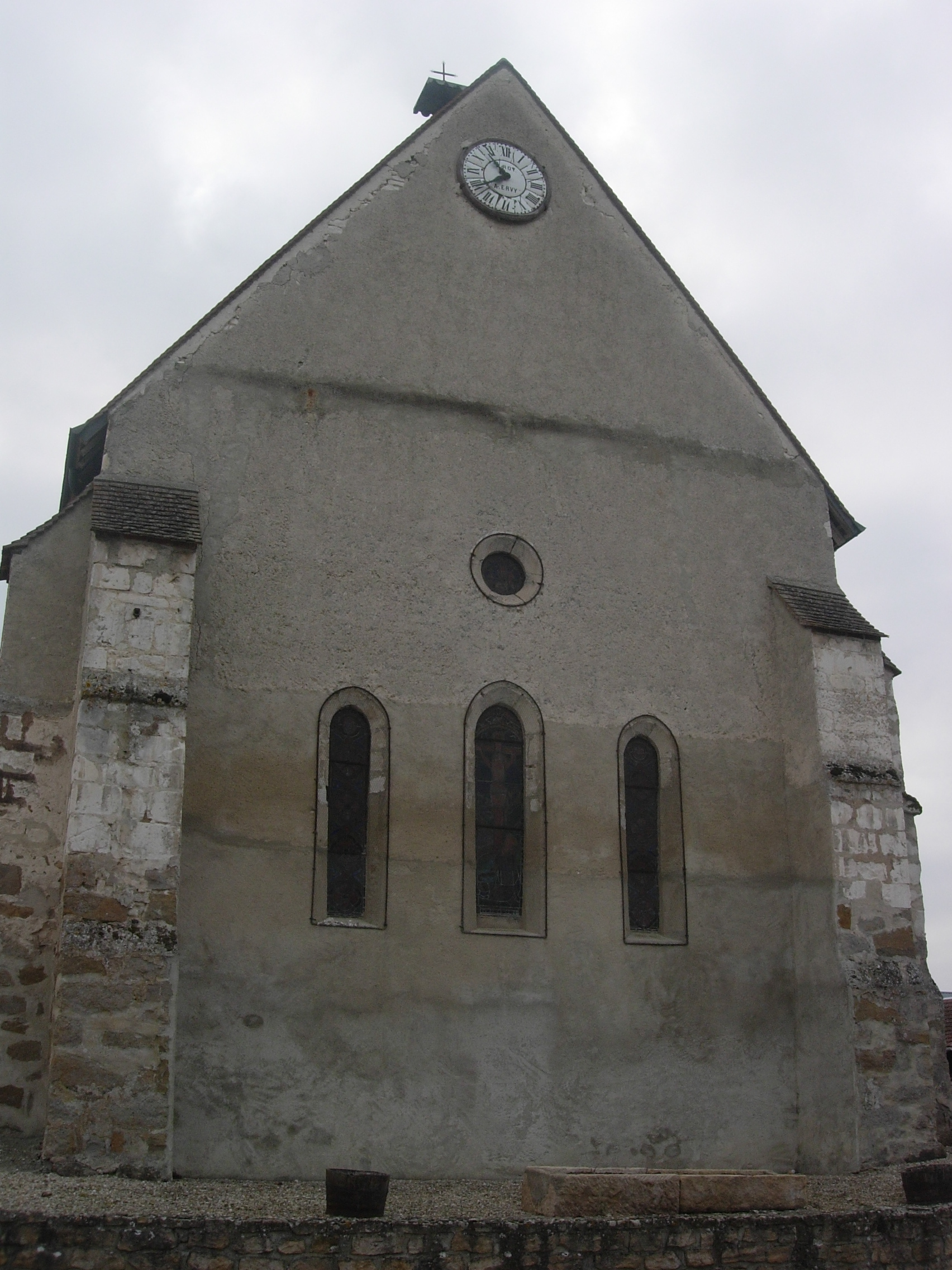
- The church in Prunay-Belleville
- Location of Prunay-Belleville
- Location within France Location within Grand Est
- Coordinates: 48°22′07″N 3°46′16″E
- Country: France
- Region: Grand Est
- Department: Aube
- Arrondissement: Nogent-sur-Seine
- Canton: Saint-Lyé
- Intercommunality: Orvin et Ardusson

Government
  - Mayor (2020–2026): Denis Pinto
- Area^{1}: 25.65 km^{2} (9.90 sq mi)
- Elevation: 138 m (453 ft)
- Population (2023): 229
  - Density: 8.93/km^{2} (23.1/sq mi)
- Time zone: UTC+01:00 (CET)
  - Summer (DST): UTC+02:00 (CEST)
- INSEE/Postal code: 10308 /10350
- ^{1} French Land Register data, which excludes lakes, ponds, glaciers > 1 km^{2} (0.386 sq mi or 247 acres) and river estuaries.

Prunay-Belleville (French pronunciation: [pʁynɛ bɛlvil]) is a commune in the Aube department in north-central France.

== Population ==
Historical population
Year	Pop.	±% p.a.
1968	202	—
1975	187	−1.10%
1982	192	+0.38%
1990	243	+2.99%
1999	231	−0.56%
2007	224	−0.38%
2012	244	+1.73%
2017	217	−2.32%
2023	229	+0.90%
Source: INSEE

== See also ==
- Communes of the Aube department
