= Droupt-Sainte-Marie =

Commune in Grand Est, France

- Commune
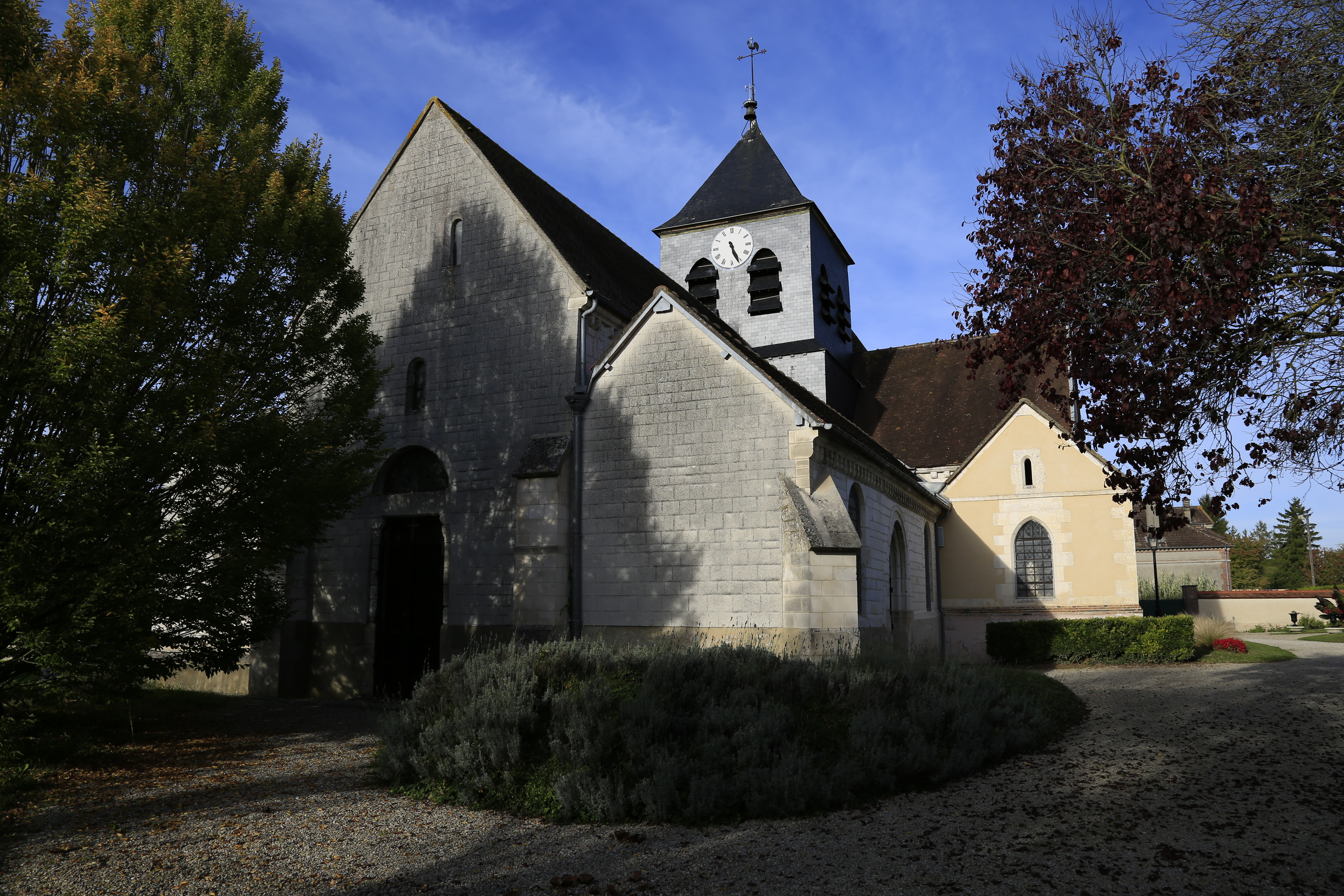
- The church in Droupt-Sainte-Marie

- Coat of arms
- Location of Droupt-Sainte-Marie
- Location within France Location within Grand Est
- Coordinates: 48°29′37″N 3°55′24″E
- Country: France
- Region: Grand Est
- Department: Aube
- Arrondissement: Nogent-sur-Seine
- Canton: Creney-près-Troyes

Government
  - Mayor (2020–2026): Christian Stapf
- Area^{1}: 14.4 km^{2} (5.6 sq mi)
- Elevation: 87 m (285 ft)
- Population (2023): 256
  - Density: 17.8/km^{2} (46.0/sq mi)
- Time zone: UTC+01:00 (CET)
  - Summer (DST): UTC+02:00 (CEST)
- INSEE/Postal code: 10132 /10170
- ^{1} French Land Register data, which excludes lakes, ponds, glaciers > 1 km^{2} (0.386 sq mi or 247 acres) and river estuaries.

Droupt-Sainte-Marie is a commune in the Aube department in the Grand Est region in north-central France.

== Population ==
Historical population
| Year | Pop. | ±% p.a. |
|---|---|---|
| 1968 | 239 | — |
| 1975 | 210 | −1.83% |
| 1982 | 199 | −0.77% |
| 1990 | 207 | +0.49% |
| 1999 | 218 | +0.58% |
| 2007 | 236 | +1.00% |
| 2012 | 233 | −0.26% |
| 2017 | 236 | +0.26% |
| 2023 | 256 | +1.36% |
Source: INSEE

== See also ==
- Communes of the Aube department
