= Mergey =

Commune in Grand Est, France

- Commune
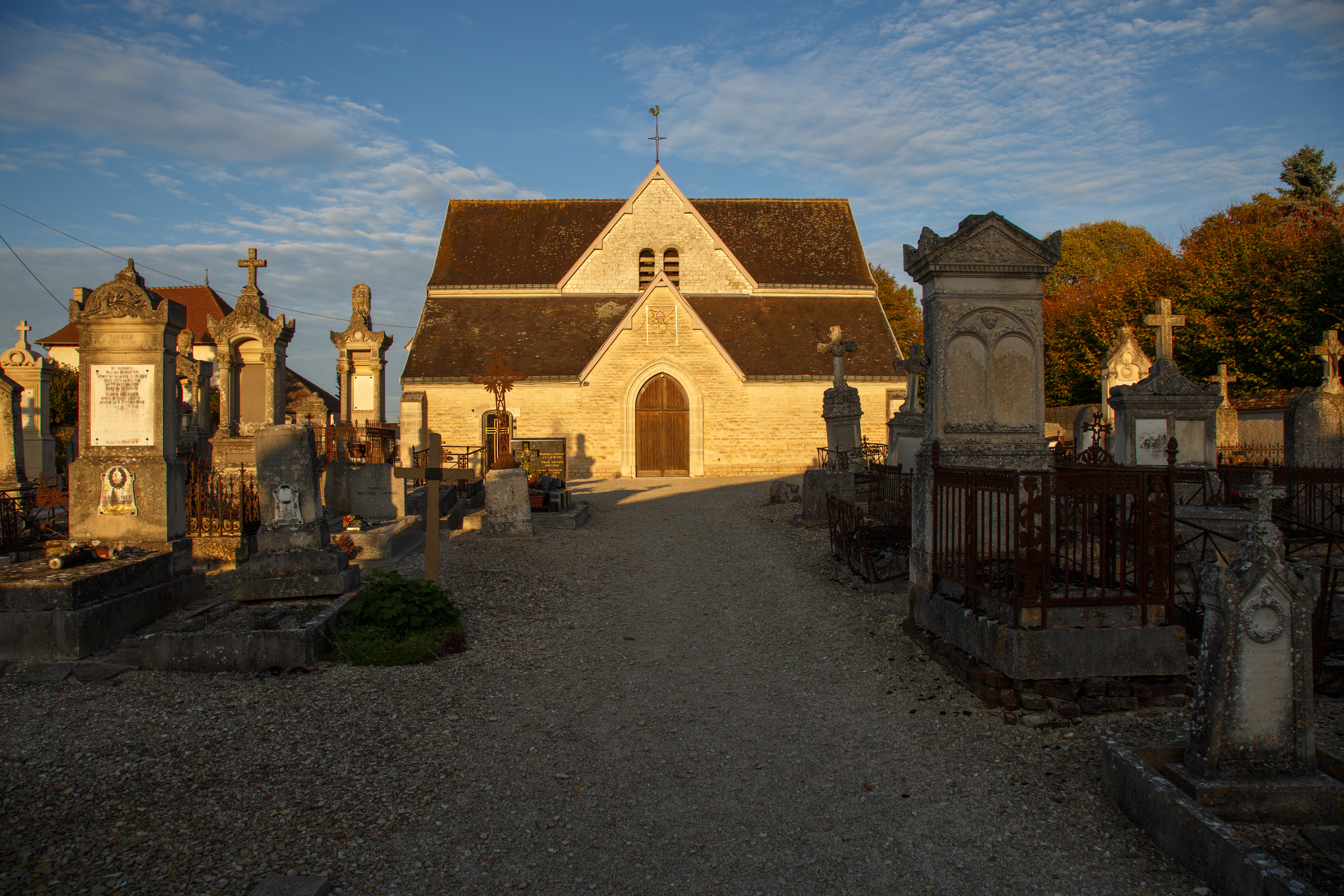
- The church in Mergey
- Location of Mergey
- Location within France Location within Grand Est
- Coordinates: 48°23′11″N 4°00′19″E
- Country: France
- Region: Grand Est
- Department: Aube
- Arrondissement: Troyes
- Canton: Creney-près-Troyes
- Intercommunality: CA Troyes Champagne Métropole

Government
  - Mayor (2020–2026): Marie-Luce Burri
- Area^{1}: 15.01 km^{2} (5.80 sq mi)
- Elevation: 99 m (325 ft)
- Highest elevation: 196 m (643 ft)
- Lowest elevation: 91 m (299 ft)
- Population (2023): 654
  - Density: 43.6/km^{2} (113/sq mi)
- Time zone: UTC+01:00 (CET)
  - Summer (DST): UTC+02:00 (CEST)
- INSEE/Postal code: 10230 /10600
- ^{1} French Land Register data, which excludes lakes, ponds, glaciers > 1 km^{2} (0.386 sq mi or 247 acres) and river estuaries.

Mergey (French pronunciation: [mɛʁʒɛ]) is a commune in the Aube department in north-central France.

== Population ==
Historical population
Year	Pop.	±% p.a.
1968	371	—
1975	350	−0.83%
1982	418	+2.57%
1990	594	+4.49%
1999	605	+0.20%
2007	661	+1.11%
2012	695	+1.01%
2017	690	−0.14%
2023	654	−0.89%
Source: INSEE

== See also ==
- Communes of the Aube department
