= Chauchigny =

Commune in Grand Est, France

- Commune
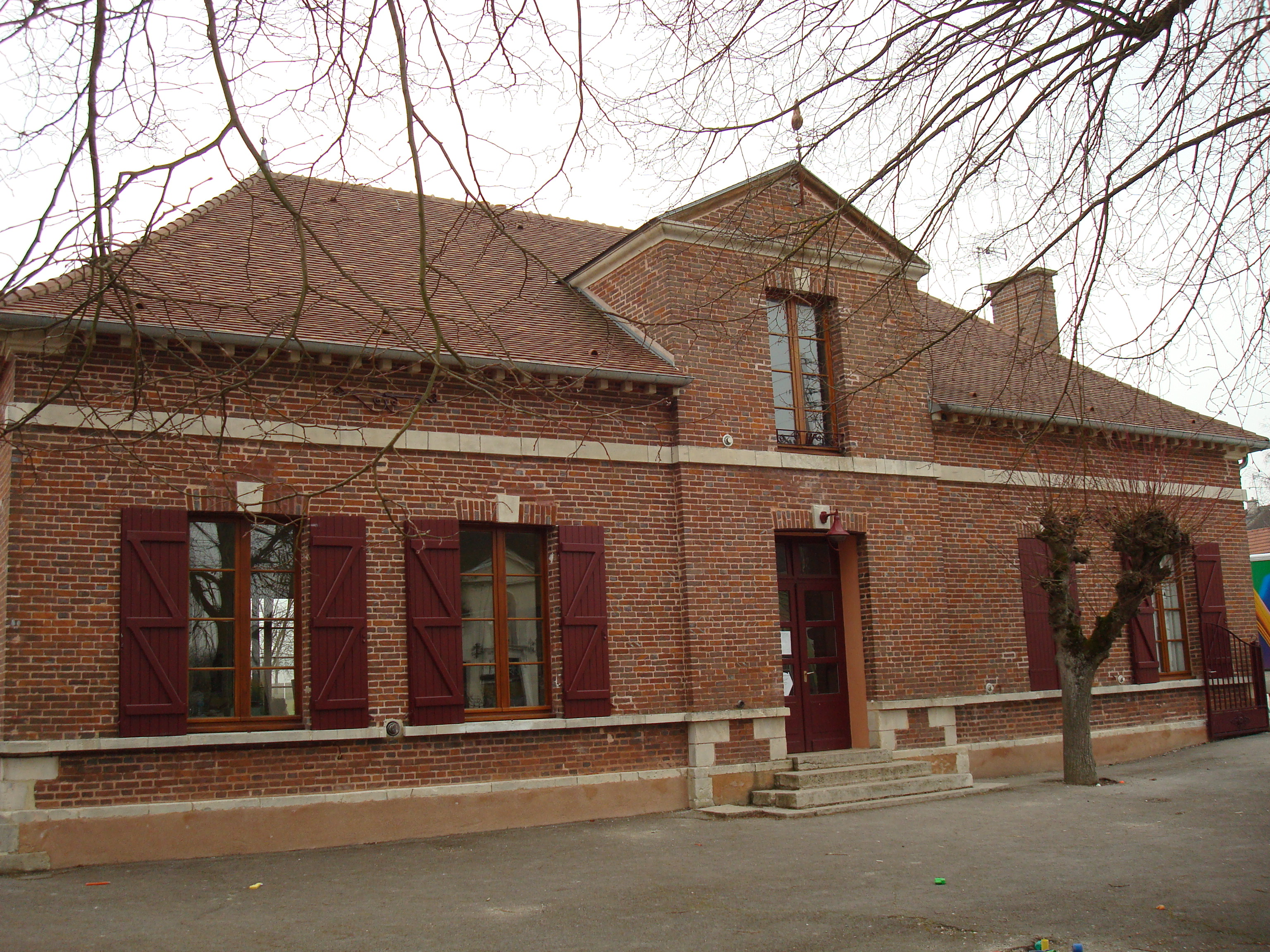
- Location of Chauchigny
- Location within France Location within Grand Est
- Coordinates: 48°25′27″N 3°58′07″E
- Country: France
- Region: Grand Est
- Department: Aube
- Arrondissement: Nogent-sur-Seine
- Canton: Creney-près-Troyes

Government
  - Mayor (2020–2026): Richard Brugger
- Area^{1}: 9.72 km^{2} (3.75 sq mi)
- Elevation: 95 m (312 ft)
- Population (2023): 219
  - Density: 22.5/km^{2} (58.4/sq mi)
- Time zone: UTC+01:00 (CET)
  - Summer (DST): UTC+02:00 (CEST)
- INSEE/Postal code: 10090 /10170
- ^{1} French Land Register data, which excludes lakes, ponds, glaciers > 1 km^{2} (0.386 sq mi or 247 acres) and river estuaries.

Chauchigny (French pronunciation: [ʃoʃiɲi]) is a commune in the Aube department in north-central France.

== Population ==
Historical population
Year	Pop.	±% p.a.
1968	226	—
1975	204	−1.45%
1982	212	+0.55%
1990	224	+0.69%
1999	254	+1.41%
2007	252	−0.10%
2012	257	+0.39%
2017	246	−0.87%
2023	219	−1.92%
Source: INSEE

== See also ==
- Communes of the Aube department
