= Arrondissement of Nogent-sur-Seine =

Coordinates: 48.48°N 3.50°E

Nogent-sur-Seine
- Arrondissement
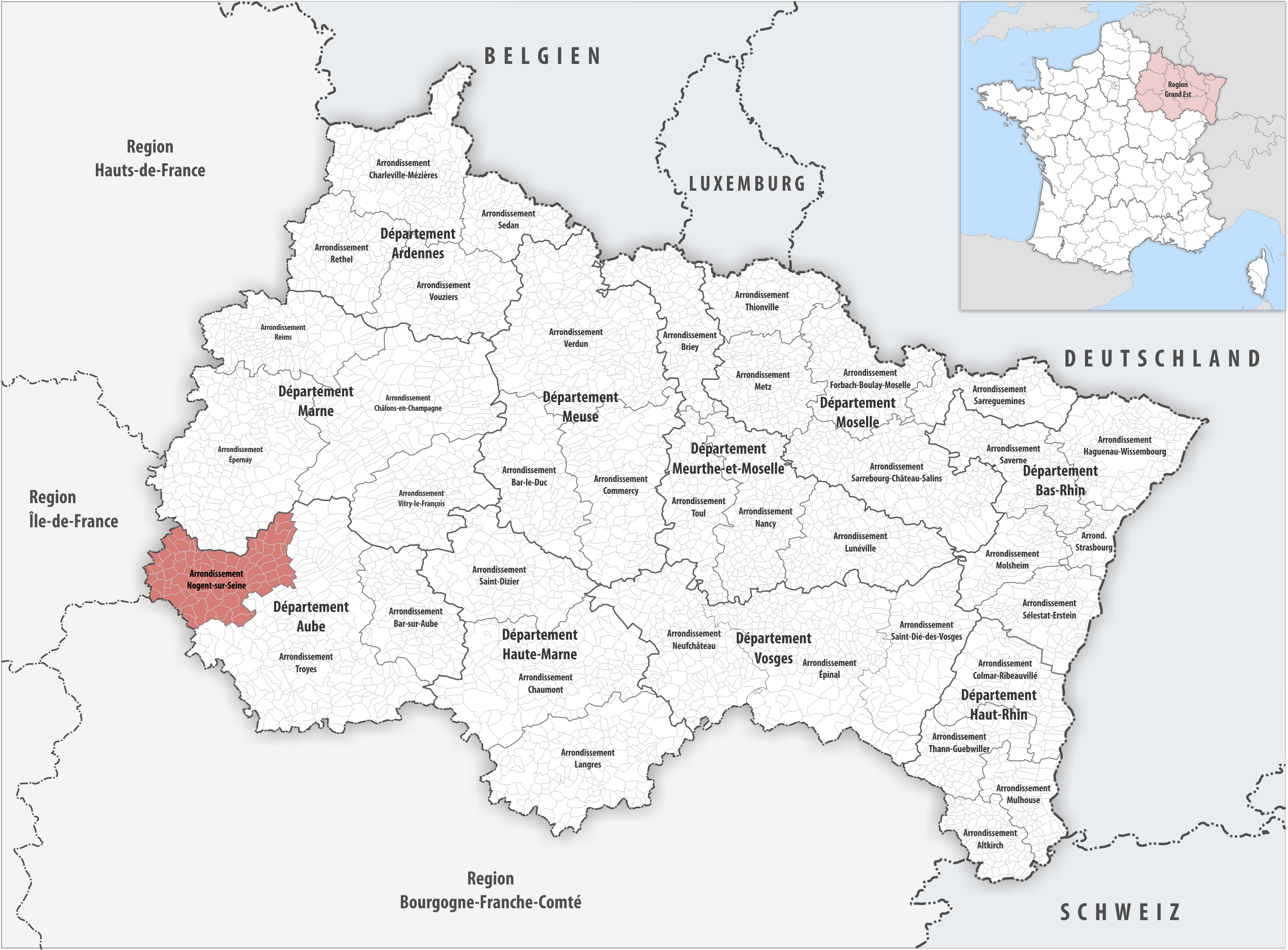
- Location within the region Grand Est
- Country: France
- Region: Grand Est
- Department: Aube
- No. of communes: {{{nbcomm}}}
- Area: 1,223.6 km^{2} (472.4 sq mi)
- Population (2023): 53,899
  - Density: 44.050/km^{2} (114.09/sq mi)
- INSEE code: 102

The arrondissement of Nogent-sur-Seine is an arrondissement of France in the Aube department in the Grand Est region. It has 79 communes. Its population is 54,005 (2021), and its area is 1,223.6 km^{2} (472.4 sq mi).

== Composition ==
The communes of the arrondissement of Nogent-sur-Seine, and their INSEE codes, are:

1. Avant-lès-Marcilly (10020)
2. Avon-la-Pèze (10023)
3. Barbuise (10031)
4. Bercenay-le-Hayer (10038)
5. Bessy (10043)
6. Boulages (10052)
7. Bourdenay (10054)
8. Bouy-sur-Orvin (10057)
9. Champfleury (10075)
10. Chapelle-Vallon (10082)
11. Charmoy (10085)
12. Charny-le-Bachot (10086)
13. Châtres (10089)
14. Chauchigny (10090)
15. Courceroy (10106)
16. Crancey (10114)
17. Dierrey-Saint-Julien (10124)
18. Droupt-Saint-Basle (10131)
19. Droupt-Sainte-Marie (10132)
20. Échemines (10134)
21. Étrelles-sur-Aube (10144)
22. Faux-Villecerf (10145)
23. Fay-lès-Marcilly (10146)
24. Ferreux-Quincey (10148)
25. Fontaine-les-Grès (10151)
26. Fontaine-Mâcon (10153)
27. Fontenay-de-Bossery (10154)
28. La Fosse-Corduan (10157)
29. Gélannes (10164)
30. Les Grandes-Chapelles (10166)
31. Gumery (10169)
32. Longueville-sur-Aube (10207)
33. La Louptière-Thénard (10208)
34. Maizières-la-Grande-Paroisse (10220)
35. Marcilly-le-Hayer (10223)
36. Marigny-le-Châtel (10224)
37. Marnay-sur-Seine (10225)
38. Le Mériot (10231)
39. Méry-sur-Seine (10233)
40. Mesgrigny (10234)
41. Mesnil-Saint-Loup (10237)
42. Montpothier (10254)
43. La Motte-Tilly (10259)
44. Nogent-sur-Seine (10268)
45. Origny-le-Sec (10271)
46. Orvilliers-Saint-Julien (10274)
47. Ossey-les-Trois-Maisons (10275)
48. Pars-lès-Romilly (10280)
49. Périgny-la-Rose (10284)
50. Plancy-l'Abbaye (10289)
51. Plessis-Barbuise (10291)
52. Pont-sur-Seine (10298)
53. Pouy-sur-Vannes (10301)
54. Prémierfait (10305)
55. Prunay-Belleville (10308)
56. Rhèges (10316)
57. Rigny-la-Nonneuse (10318)
58. Rilly-Sainte-Syre (10320)
59. Romilly-sur-Seine (10323)
60. Saint-Aubin (10334)
61. Saint-Flavy (10339)
62. Saint-Hilaire-sous-Romilly (10341)
63. Saint-Loup-de-Buffigny (10347)
64. Saint-Lupien (10348)
65. Saint-Martin-de-Bossenay (10351)
66. Saint-Mesmin (10353)
67. Saint-Nicolas-la-Chapelle (10355)
68. Saint-Oulph (10356)
69. Salon (10365)
70. La Saulsotte (10367)
71. Savières (10368)
72. Soligny-les-Étangs (10370)
73. Traînel (10382)
74. Trancault (10383)
75. Vallant-Saint-Georges (10392)
76. Viâpres-le-Petit (10408)
77. Villadin (10410)
78. Villenauxe-la-Grande (10420)
79. La Villeneuve-au-Châtelot (10421)

== History ==
The arrondissement of Nogent-sur-Seine was created in 1800. At the January 2018 reorganization of the arrondissements of Aube, it lost one commune to the arrondissement of Troyes.

As a result of the reorganisation of the cantons of France which came into effect in 2015, the borders of the cantons are no longer related to the borders of the arrondissements. The cantons of the arrondissement of Nogent-sur-Seine were, as of January 2015:

1. Marcilly-le-Hayer
2. Méry-sur-Seine
3. Nogent-sur-Seine
4. Romilly-sur-Seine-1
5. Romilly-sur-Seine-2
6. Villenauxe-la-Grande
