= Les Grandes-Chapelles =

Commune in Grand Est, France

- Commune
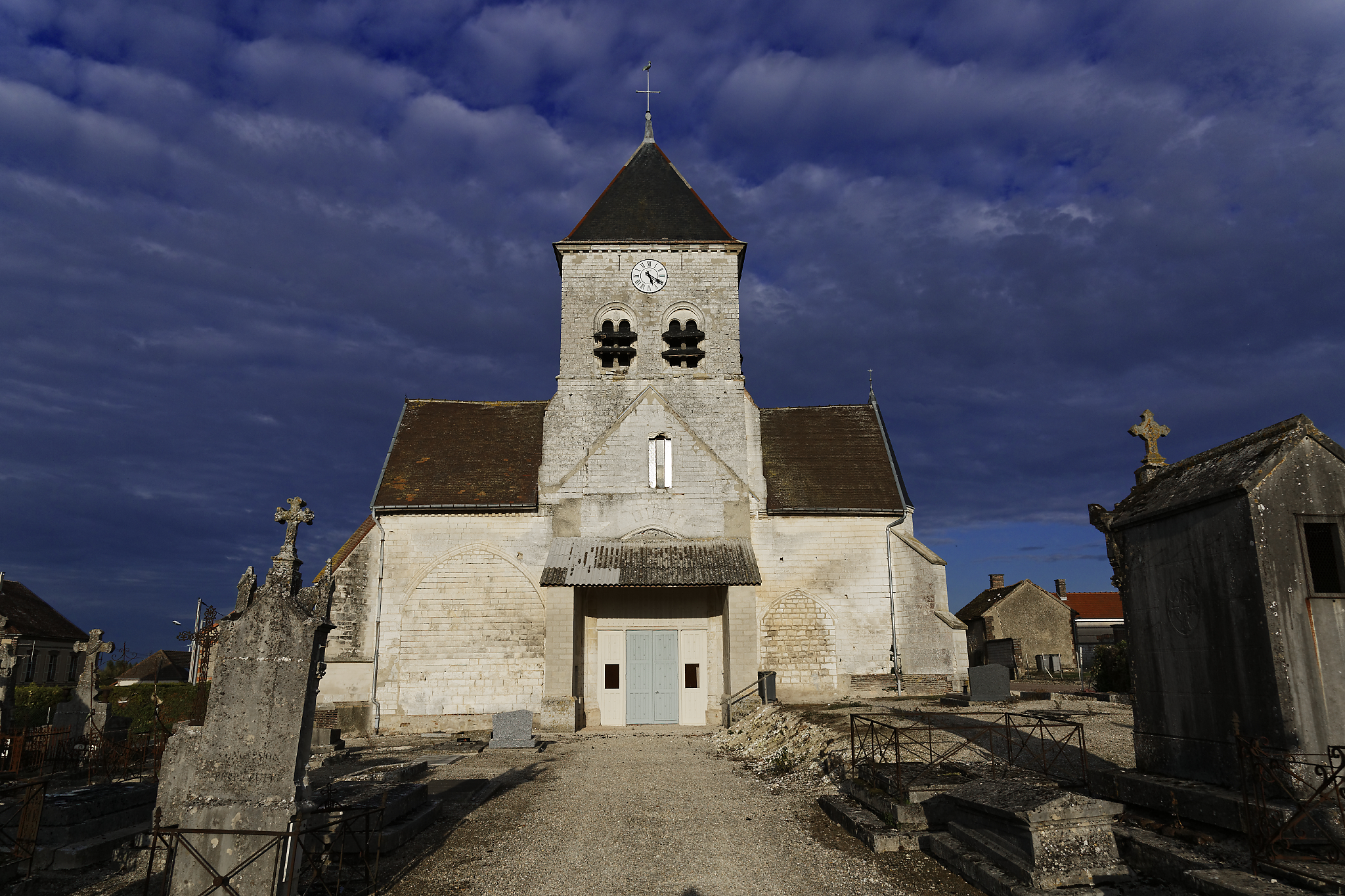
- The church in Les Grandes-Chapelles

- Coat of arms
- Location of Les Grandes-Chapelles
- Location within France Location within Grand Est
- Coordinates: 48°28′02″N 4°01′01″E
- Country: France
- Region: Grand Est
- Department: Aube
- Arrondissement: Nogent-sur-Seine
- Canton: Creney-près-Troyes

Government
  - Mayor (2020–2026): Dominique Gamichon
- Area^{1}: 22.1 km^{2} (8.5 sq mi)
- Elevation: 112 m (367 ft)
- Highest elevation: 114 m (374 ft)
- Lowest elevation: 109 m (358 ft)
- Population (2023): 401
  - Density: 18.1/km^{2} (47.0/sq mi)
- Time zone: UTC+01:00 (CET)
  - Summer (DST): UTC+02:00 (CEST)
- INSEE/Postal code: 10166 /10170
- ^{1} French Land Register data, which excludes lakes, ponds, glaciers > 1 km^{2} (0.386 sq mi or 247 acres) and river estuaries.

Les Grandes-Chapelles (French pronunciation: [le ɡʁɑ̃d ʃapɛl]) is a commune in the Aube department in north-central France.

== Population ==
Historical population
Year	Pop.	±% p.a.
1968	378	—
1975	354	−0.93%
1982	344	−0.41%
1990	325	−0.71%
1999	326	+0.03%
2007	362	+1.32%
2012	398	+1.91%
2017	393	−0.25%
2023	401	+0.34%
Source: INSEE

== See also ==
- Communes of the Aube department
