= Communes of the Aube department =

The following is a list of the 431 communes of the Aube department of France.

The communes cooperate in the following intercommunalities (as of 2025):

- Communauté d'agglomération Troyes Champagne Métropole
- Communauté de communes d'Arcis, Mailly, Ramerupt
- Communauté de communes du Barséquanais en Champagne
- Communauté de communes du Chaourçois et du Val d'Armance
- Communauté de communes Forêts, Lacs, Terres en Champagne
- Communauté de communes des Lacs de Champagne
- Communauté de communes du Nogentais
- Communauté de communes de l'Orvin et de l'Ardusson
- Communauté de communes du Pays d'Othe
- Communauté de communes des Portes de Romilly-sur-Seine
- Communauté de communes de la Région de Bar-sur-Aube
- Communauté de communes Seine et Aube
- Communauté de communes de Vendeuvre-Soulaines

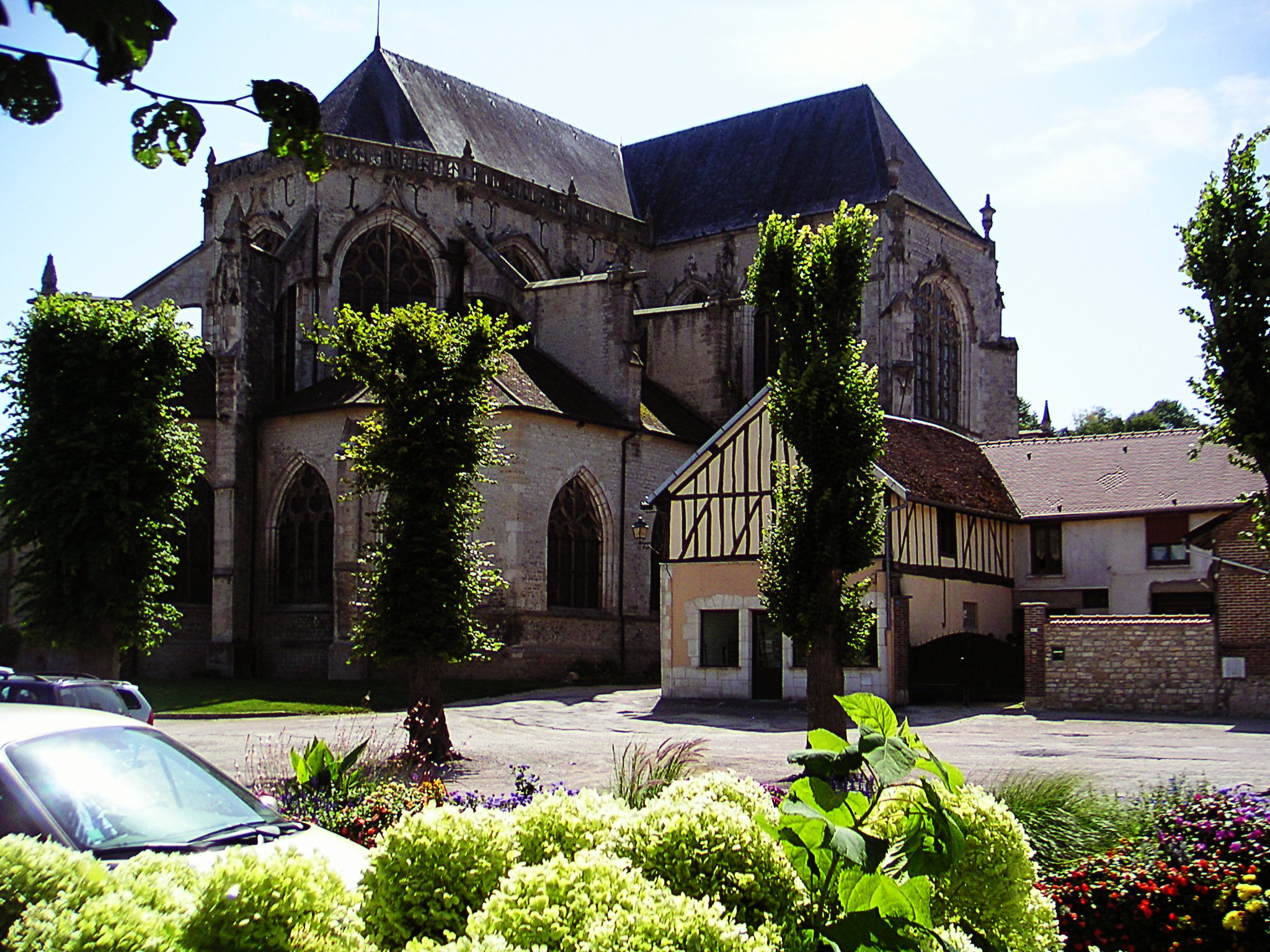

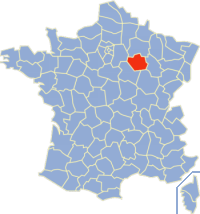

INSEE	Postal	Commune
10002	10200	Ailleville
10003	10160	Aix-Villemaur-Pâlis
10004	10700	Allibaudières
10005	10140	Amance
10006	10700	Arcis-sur-Aube
10007	10200	Arconville
10008	10140	Argançon
10009	10340	Arrelles
10010	10330	Arrembécourt
10011	10200	Arrentières
10012	10200	Arsonval
10013	10320	Assenay
10014	10220	Assencières
10015	10150	Aubeterre
10017	10240	Aulnay
10018	10130	Auxon
10020	10400	Avant-lès-Marcilly
10021	10240	Avant-lès-Ramerupt
10022	10340	Avirey-Lingey
10023	10290	Avon-la-Pèze
10024	10130	Avreuil
10025	10340	Bagneux-la-Fosse
10026	10330	Bailly-le-Franc
10027	10330	Balignicourt
10028	10210	Balnot-la-Grange
10029	10110	Balnot-sur-Laignes
10030	10600	Barberey-Saint-Sulpice
10031	10400	Barbuise
10032	10200	Baroville
10033	10200	Bar-sur-Aube
10034	10110	Bar-sur-Seine
10035	10310	Bayel
10037	10190	Bercenay-en-Othe
10038	10290	Bercenay-le-Hayer
10039	10200	Bergères
10040	10130	Bernon
10041	10110	Bertignolles
10042	10160	Bérulle
10043	10170	Bessy
10044	10500	Bétignicourt
10045	10140	Beurey
10046	10500	Blaincourt-sur-Aube
10047	10500	Blignicourt
10048	10200	Bligny
10049	10800	Les Bordes-Aumont
10050	10140	Bossancourt
10051	10320	Bouilly
10052	10380	Boulages
10053	10270	Bouranton
10054	10290	Bourdenay
10055	10110	Bourguignons
10056	10220	Bouy-Luxembourg
10057	10400	Bouy-sur-Orvin
10058	10340	Bragelogne-Beauvoir
10059	10500	Braux
10060	10450	Bréviandes
10061	10220	Brévonnes
10062	10140	Briel-sur-Barse
10063	10500	Brienne-la-Vieille
10064	10500	Brienne-le-Château
10065	10240	Brillecourt
10066	10190	Bucey-en-Othe
10067	10800	Buchères
10068	10110	Buxeuil
10069	10110	Buxières-sur-Arce
10070	10110	Celles-sur-Ource
10071	10110	Chacenay
10072	10500	La Chaise
10073	10500	Chalette-sur-Voire
10074	10130	Chamoy
10075	10700	Champfleury
10076	10200	Champignol-lez-Mondeville
10077	10700	Champigny-sur-Aube
10078	10140	Champ-sur-Barse
10079	10340	Channes
10080	10210	Chaource
10081	10600	La Chapelle-Saint-Luc
10082	10700	Chapelle-Vallon
10083	10260	Chappes
10084	10150	Charmont-sous-Barbuise
10085	10290	Charmoy
10086	10380	Charny-le-Bachot
10087	10210	Chaserey
10089	10510	Châtres
10090	10170	Chauchigny
10091	10240	Chaudrey
10092	10110	Chauffour-lès-Bailly
10093	10500	Chaumesnil
10094	10330	Chavanges
10095	10700	Le Chêne
10096	10190	Chennegy
10097	10110	Chervey
10098	10210	Chesley
10099	10130	Chessy-les-Prés
10100	10390	Clérey
10101	10240	Coclois
10102	10200	Colombé-la-Fosse
10103	10200	Colombé-le-Sec
10104	10800	Cormost
10105	10500	Courcelles-sur-Voire
10106	10400	Courceroy
10107	10130	Coursan-en-Othe
10108	10130	Courtaoult
10109	10260	Courtenot
10110	10270	Courteranges
10111	10250	Courteron
10112	10210	Coussegrey
10113	10200	Couvignon
10114	10100	Crancey
10115	10150	Creney-près-Troyes
10116	10320	Crésantignes
10117	10500	Crespy-le-Neuf
10118	10130	Les Croûtes
10119	10360	Cunfin
10120	10210	Cussangy
10121	10240	Dampierre
10122	10130	Davrey
10123	10500	Dienville
10124	10190	Dierrey-Saint-Julien
10125	10190	Dierrey-Saint-Pierre
10126	10200	Dolancourt
10127	10240	Dommartin-le-Coq
10128	10330	Donnement
10129	10220	Dosches
10130	10700	Dosnon
10131	10170	Droupt-Saint-Basle
10132	10170	Droupt-Sainte-Marie
10133	10130	Eaux-Puiseaux
10134	10350	Échemines
10135	10200	Éclance
10136	10110	Éguilly-sous-Bois
10137	10200	Engente
10138	10500	Épagne
10139	10500	Épothémont
10140	10130	Ervy-le-Châtel
10141	10360	Essoyes
10142	10190	Estissac
10143	10210	Étourvy
10144	10170	Étrelles-sur-Aube
10145	10290	Faux-Villecerf
10146	10290	Fay-lès-Marcilly
10147	10320	Fays-la-Chapelle
10148	10400	Ferreux-Quincey
10149	10150	Feuges
10150	10200	Fontaine
10151	10280	Fontaine-les-Grès
10153	10400	Fontaine-Mâcon
10154	10400	Fontenay-de-Bossery
10155	10360	Fontette
10156	10190	Fontvannes
10157	10100	La Fosse-Corduan
10158	10260	Fouchères
10159	10110	Fralignes
10160	10200	Fravaux
10161	10200	Fresnay
10162	10270	Fresnoy-le-Château
10163	10200	Fuligny
10164	10100	Gélannes
10165	10220	Géraudot
10166	10170	Les Grandes-Chapelles
10167	10700	Grandville
10168	10210	Les Granges
10169	10400	Gumery
10170	10250	Gyé-sur-Seine
10171	10500	Hampigny
10172	10700	Herbisse
10174	10240	Isle-Aubigny
10173	10800	Isle-Aumont
10175	10330	Jasseines
10176	10200	Jaucourt
10177	10320	Javernant
10178	10140	Jessains
10179	10320	Jeugny
10180	10330	Joncreuil
10181	10260	Jully-sur-Sarce
10182	10310	Juvancourt
10183	10140	Juvanzé
10184	10500	Juzanvigny
10185	10210	Lagesse
10186	10120	Laines-aux-Bois
10187	10110	Landreville
10188	10210	Lantages
10189	10500	Lassicourt
10190	10270	Laubressel
10191	10150	Lavau
10192	10330	Lentilles
10193	10500	Lesmont
10194	10200	Lévigny
10195	10700	Lhuître
10196	10130	Lignières
10197	10200	Lignol-le-Château
10198	10320	Lirey
10199	10110	Loches-sur-Ource
10200	10140	La Loge-aux-Chèvres
10201	10210	La Loge-Pomblin
10202	10210	Les Loges-Margueron
10203	10310	Longchamp-sur-Aujon
10204	10320	Longeville-sur-Mogne
10205	10140	Longpré-le-Sec
10206	10240	Longsols
10207	10170	Longueville-sur-Aube
10208	10400	La Louptière-Thénard
10209	10270	Lusigny-sur-Barse
10210	10150	Luyères
10211	10300	Macey
10212	10320	Machy
10213	10110	Magnant
10214	10240	Magnicourt
10215	10140	Magny-Fouchard
10216	10230	Mailly-le-Camp
10217	10140	Maison-des-Champs
10218	10210	Maisons-lès-Chaource
10219	10200	Maisons-lès-Soulaines
10220	10510	Maizières-la-Grande-Paroisse
10221	10500	Maizières-lès-Brienne
10222	10160	Maraye-en-Othe
10223	10290	Marcilly-le-Hayer

INSEE	Postal	Commune
10224	10350	Marigny-le-Châtel
10225	10400	Marnay-sur-Seine
10226	10110	Marolles-lès-Bailly
10227	10130	Marolles-sous-Lignières
10228	10500	Mathaux
10229	10320	Maupas
10230	10600	Mergey
10231	10400	Le Mériot
10232	10110	Merrey-sur-Arce
10233	10170	Méry-sur-Seine
10234	10170	Mesgrigny
10235	10700	Mesnil-la-Comtesse
10236	10240	Mesnil-Lettre
10237	10190	Mesnil-Saint-Loup
10238	10140	Mesnil-Saint-Père
10239	10220	Mesnil-Sellières
10240	10190	Messon
10241	10210	Metz-Robert
10242	10200	Meurville
10243	10500	Molins-sur-Aube
10245	10270	Montaulin
10246	10260	Montceaux-lès-Vaudes
10247	10130	Montfey
10248	10300	Montgueux
10249	10270	Montiéramey
10250	10200	Montier-en-l'Isle
10251	10130	Montigny-les-Monts
10252	10140	Montmartin-le-Haut
10253	10330	Montmorency-Beaufort
10254	10400	Montpothier
10255	10270	Montreuil-sur-Barse
10256	10150	Montsuzain
10257	10240	Morembert
10258	10500	Morvilliers
10259	10400	La Motte-Tilly
10260	10800	Moussey
10261	10250	Mussy-sur-Seine
10262	10250	Neuville-sur-Seine
10263	10190	Neuville-sur-Vanne
10264	10360	Noé-les-Mallets
10265	10420	Les Noës-près-Troyes
10266	10160	Nogent-en-Othe
10267	10240	Nogent-sur-Aube
10268	10400	Nogent-sur-Seine
10269	10700	Nozay
10270	10220	Onjon
10271	10510	Origny-le-Sec
10272	10700	Ormes
10273	10700	Ortillon
10274	10170	Orvilliers-Saint-Julien
10275	10100	Ossey-les-Trois-Maisons
10276	10160	Paisy-Cosdon
10278	10210	Pargues
10279	10330	Pars-lès-Chavanges
10280	10100	Pars-lès-Romilly
10281	10350	Le Pavillon-Sainte-Julie
10282	10600	Payns
10283	10500	Pel-et-Der
10284	10400	Périgny-la-Rose
10285	10500	Perthes-lès-Brienne
10286	10500	Petit-Mesnil
10287	10220	Piney
10288	10250	Plaines-Saint-Lange
10289	10380	Plancy-l'Abbaye
10290	10160	Planty
10291	10400	Plessis-Barbuise
10293	10700	Poivres
10294	10110	Poligny
10295	10110	Polisot
10296	10110	Polisy
10297	10150	Pont-Sainte-Marie
10298	10400	Pont-sur-Seine
10299	10700	Pouan-les-Vallées
10300	10240	Pougy
10301	10290	Pouy-sur-Vannes
10302	10210	Praslin
10303	10500	Précy-Notre-Dame
10304	10500	Précy-Saint-Martin
10305	10170	Prémierfait
10306	10200	Proverville
10307	10190	Prugny
10308	10350	Prunay-Belleville
10309	10210	Prusy
10310	10140	Puits-et-Nuisement
10312	10130	Racines
10313	10500	Radonvilliers
10314	10240	Ramerupt
10315	10500	Rances
10316	10170	Rhèges
10317	10340	Les Riceys
10318	10290	Rigny-la-Nonneuse
10319	10160	Rigny-le-Ferron
10320	10280	Rilly-Sainte-Syre
10321	10440	La Rivière-de-Corps
10323	10100	Romilly-sur-Seine
10324	10320	Roncenay
10325	10430	Rosières-près-Troyes
10326	10500	Rosnay-l'Hôpital
10327	10500	La Rothière
10328	10220	Rouilly-Sacey
10329	10800	Rouilly-Saint-Loup
10330	10200	Rouvres-les-Vignes
10331	10260	Rumilly-lès-Vaudes
10332	10410	Ruvigny
10333	10120	Saint-André-les-Vergers
10334	10400	Saint-Aubin
10335	10160	Saint-Benoist-sur-Vanne
10336	10180	Saint-Benoît-sur-Seine
10337	10500	Saint-Christophe-Dodinicourt
10352	10150	Sainte-Maure
10362	10300	Sainte-Savine
10338	10700	Saint-Étienne-sous-Barbuise
10339	10350	Saint-Flavy
10340	10120	Saint-Germain
10341	10100	Saint-Hilaire-sous-Romilly
10342	10320	Saint-Jean-de-Bonneval
10343	10800	Saint-Julien-les-Villas
10344	10800	Saint-Léger-près-Troyes
10345	10500	Saint-Léger-sous-Brienne
10346	10330	Saint-Léger-sous-Margerie
10347	10100	Saint-Loup-de-Buffigny
10348	10350	Saint-Lupien
10349	10180	Saint-Lyé
10350	10160	Saint-Mards-en-Othe
10351	10100	Saint-Martin-de-Bossenay
10353	10280	Saint-Mesmin
10354	10700	Saint-Nabord-sur-Aube
10355	10400	Saint-Nicolas-la-Chapelle
10356	10170	Saint-Oulph
10357	10410	Saint-Parres-aux-Tertres
10358	10260	Saint-Parres-lès-Vaudes
10359	10130	Saint-Phal
10360	10120	Saint-Pouange
10361	10700	Saint-Remy-sous-Barbuise
10363	10800	Saint-Thibault
10364	10360	Saint-Usage
10365	10700	Salon
10366	10200	Saulcy
10367	10400	La Saulsotte
10368	10600	Savières
10369	10700	Semoine
10370	10400	Soligny-les-Étangs
10371	10320	Sommeval
10372	10200	Soulaines-Dhuys
10373	10320	Souligny
10374	10200	Spoy
10375	10410	Thennelières
10376	10140	Thieffrain
10377	10200	Thil
10378	10200	Thors
10379	10700	Torcy-le-Grand
10380	10700	Torcy-le-Petit
10381	10440	Torvilliers
10382	10400	Traînel
10383	10290	Trancault
10384	10140	Trannes
10386	10700	Trouans
10387	10000	Troyes
10388	10210	Turgy
10389	10140	Unienville
10390	10200	Urville
10391	10150	Vailly
10019	10220	Val-d'Auzon
10392	10170	Vallant-Saint-Georges
10393	10500	Vallentigny
10394	10210	Vallières
10395	10210	Vanlay
10396	10190	Vauchassis
10397	10140	Vauchonvilliers
10398	10240	Vaucogne
10399	10260	Vaudes
10400	10700	Vaupoisson
10401	10140	Vendeuvre-sur-Barse
10402	10800	La Vendue-Mignot
10403	10200	Vernonvilliers
10404	10360	Verpillières-sur-Ource
10405	10240	Verricourt
10406	10390	Verrières
10408	10380	Viâpres-le-Petit
10409	10600	Villacerf
10410	10290	Villadin
10411	10500	La Ville-aux-Bois
10412	10410	Villechétif
10414	10350	Villeloup
10416	10800	Villemereuil
10417	10160	Villemoiron-en-Othe
10418	10110	Villemorien
10419	10260	Villemoyenne
10420	10370	Villenauxe-la-Grande
10421	10400	La Villeneuve-au-Châtelot
10422	10130	Villeneuve-au-Chemin
10423	10140	La Villeneuve-au-Chêne
10424	10330	Villeret
10425	10320	Villery
10426	10310	Ville-sous-la-Ferté
10427	10110	Ville-sur-Arce
10428	10200	Ville-sur-Terre
10429	10700	Villette-sur-Aube
10430	10700	Villiers-Herbisse
10431	10210	Villiers-le-Bois
10432	10210	Villiers-sous-Praslin
10433	10140	Villy-en-Trodes
10434	10800	Villy-le-Bois
10435	10800	Villy-le-Maréchal
10436	10700	Vinets
10437	10260	Virey-sous-Bar
10438	10110	Vitry-le-Croisé
10439	10110	Viviers-sur-Artaut
10440	10200	Voigny
10441	10130	Vosnon
10442	10150	Voué
10443	10210	Vougrey
10444	10160	Vulaines
10445	10500	Yèvres-le-Petit
