= Creney-près-Troyes =

Commune in Grand Est, France

- Commune
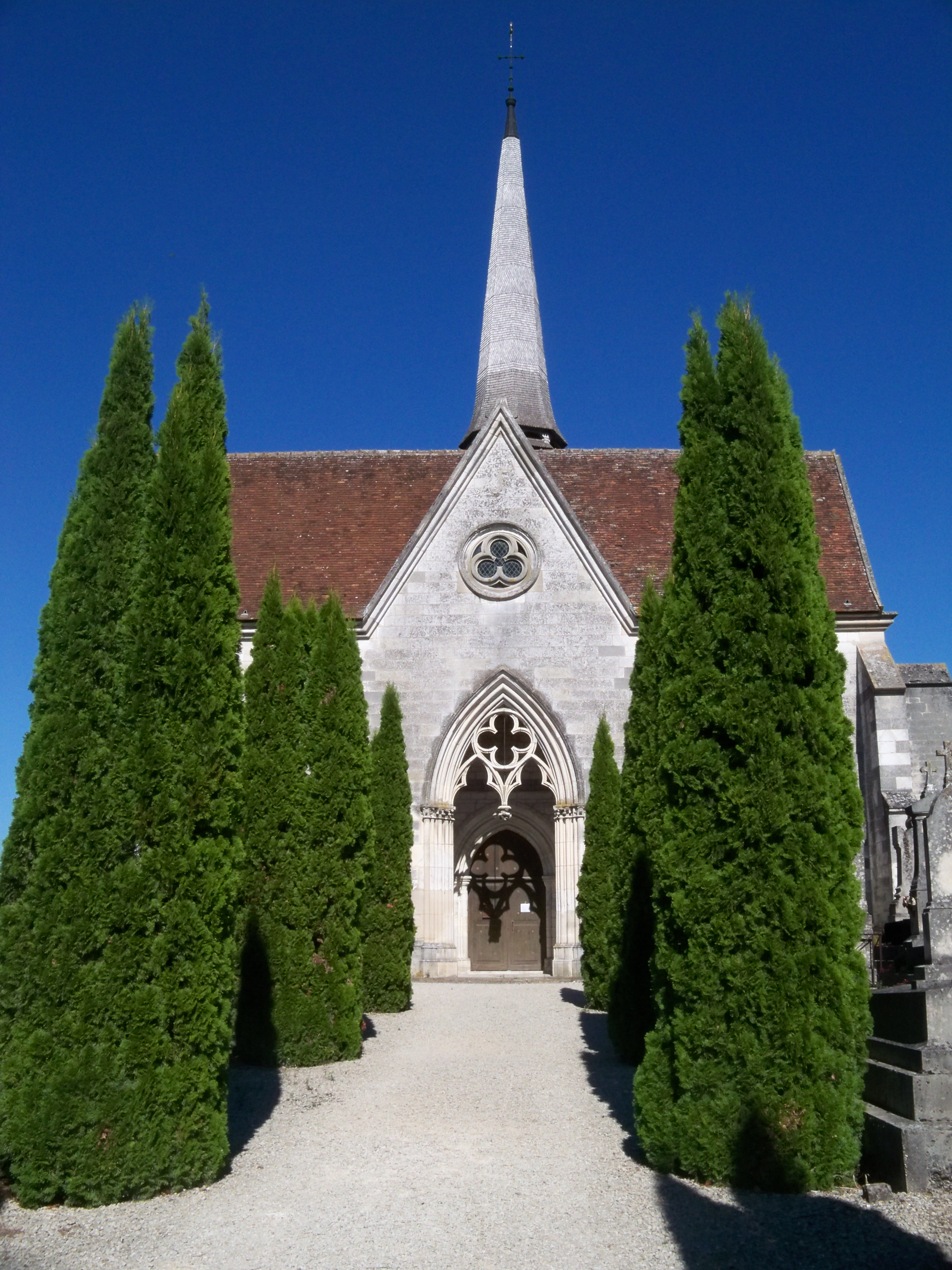
- The church in Creney-près-Troyes
- Location of Creney-près-Troyes
- Location within France Location within Grand Est
- Coordinates: 48°19′59″N 4°07′39″E
- Country: France
- Region: Grand Est
- Department: Aube
- Arrondissement: Troyes
- Canton: Creney-près-Troyes
- Intercommunality: CA Troyes Champagne Métropole

Government
  - Mayor (2020–2026): Jacky Raguin
- Area^{1}: 15.76 km^{2} (6.08 sq mi)
- Elevation: 118 m (387 ft)
- Population (2023): 2,013
  - Density: 127.7/km^{2} (330.8/sq mi)
- Time zone: UTC+01:00 (CET)
  - Summer (DST): UTC+02:00 (CEST)
- INSEE/Postal code: 10115 /10150
- ^{1} French Land Register data, which excludes lakes, ponds, glaciers > 1 km^{2} (0.386 sq mi or 247 acres) and river estuaries.

Creney-près-Troyes (French pronunciation: [kʁənɛ pʁɛ tʁwa], literally 'Creney near Troyes') is a commune in the Aube department in north-central France.

== Population ==
Historical population
Year	Pop.	±% p.a.
1968	718	—
1975	1,229	+7.98%
1982	1,587	+3.72%
1990	1,550	−0.29%
1999	1,421	−0.96%
2007	1,546	+1.06%
2012	1,701	+1.93%
2017	1,845	+1.64%
2023	2,013	+1.46%
Source: INSEE

== See also ==
- Communes of the Aube department
