= Châtres, Aube =

Commune in Grand Est, France

Châtres
- Commune
- Coat of arms
- Location of Châtres
- Location within France Location within Grand Est
- Coordinates: 48°30′11″N 3°50′58″E
- Country: France
- Region: Grand Est
- Department: Aube
- Arrondissement: Nogent-sur-Seine
- Canton: Creney-près-Troyes

Government
  - Mayor (2020–2026): Dominique Girard
- Area^{1}: 15.76 km^{2} (6.08 sq mi)
- Elevation: 76 m (249 ft)
- Population (2023): 708
  - Density: 44.9/km^{2} (116/sq mi)
- Time zone: UTC+01:00 (CET)
  - Summer (DST): UTC+02:00 (CEST)
- INSEE/Postal code: 10089 /10510
- ^{1} French Land Register data, which excludes lakes, ponds, glaciers > 1 km^{2} (0.386 sq mi or 247 acres) and river estuaries.

Châtres (French pronunciation: [ʃatʁ]) is a commune in the Aube department in north-central France.

== Population ==
Historical population
Year	Pop.	±% p.a.
1968	477	—
1975	429	−1.50%
1982	573	+4.22%
1990	590	+0.37%
1999	579	−0.21%
2007	595	+0.34%
2012	707	+3.51%
2017	699	−0.23%
2023	708	+0.21%
Source: INSEE

== See also ==
- Communes of the Aube department
