= Longueville-sur-Aube =

Commune in Grand Est, France

- Commune
- Location of Longueville-sur-Aube
- Location within France Location within Grand Est
- Coordinates: 48°33′20″N 3°54′50″E
- Country: France
- Region: Grand Est
- Department: Aube
- Arrondissement: Nogent-sur-Seine
- Canton: Creney-près-Troyes

Government
  - Mayor (2020–2026): Catherine Doyen
- Area^{1}: 11.64 km^{2} (4.49 sq mi)
- Elevation: 82 m (269 ft)
- Population (2023): 134
  - Density: 11.5/km^{2} (29.8/sq mi)
- Time zone: UTC+01:00 (CET)
  - Summer (DST): UTC+02:00 (CEST)
- INSEE/Postal code: 10207 /10170
- ^{1} French Land Register data, which excludes lakes, ponds, glaciers > 1 km^{2} (0.386 sq mi or 247 acres) and river estuaries.

Longueville-sur-Aube (French pronunciation: [lɔ̃ɡvil syʁ ob], literally Longueville on Aube) is a commune in the Aube department in north-central France.

== Population ==
Historical population
Year	Pop.	±% p.a.
1968	151	—
1975	150	−0.09%
1982	131	−1.92%
1990	117	−1.40%
1999	134	+1.52%
2007	135	+0.09%
2012	127	−1.21%
2017	123	−0.64%
2023	134	+1.44%
Source: INSEE

== See also ==
- Communes of the Aube department
