= Vallant-Saint-Georges =

Commune in Grand Est, France

- Commune
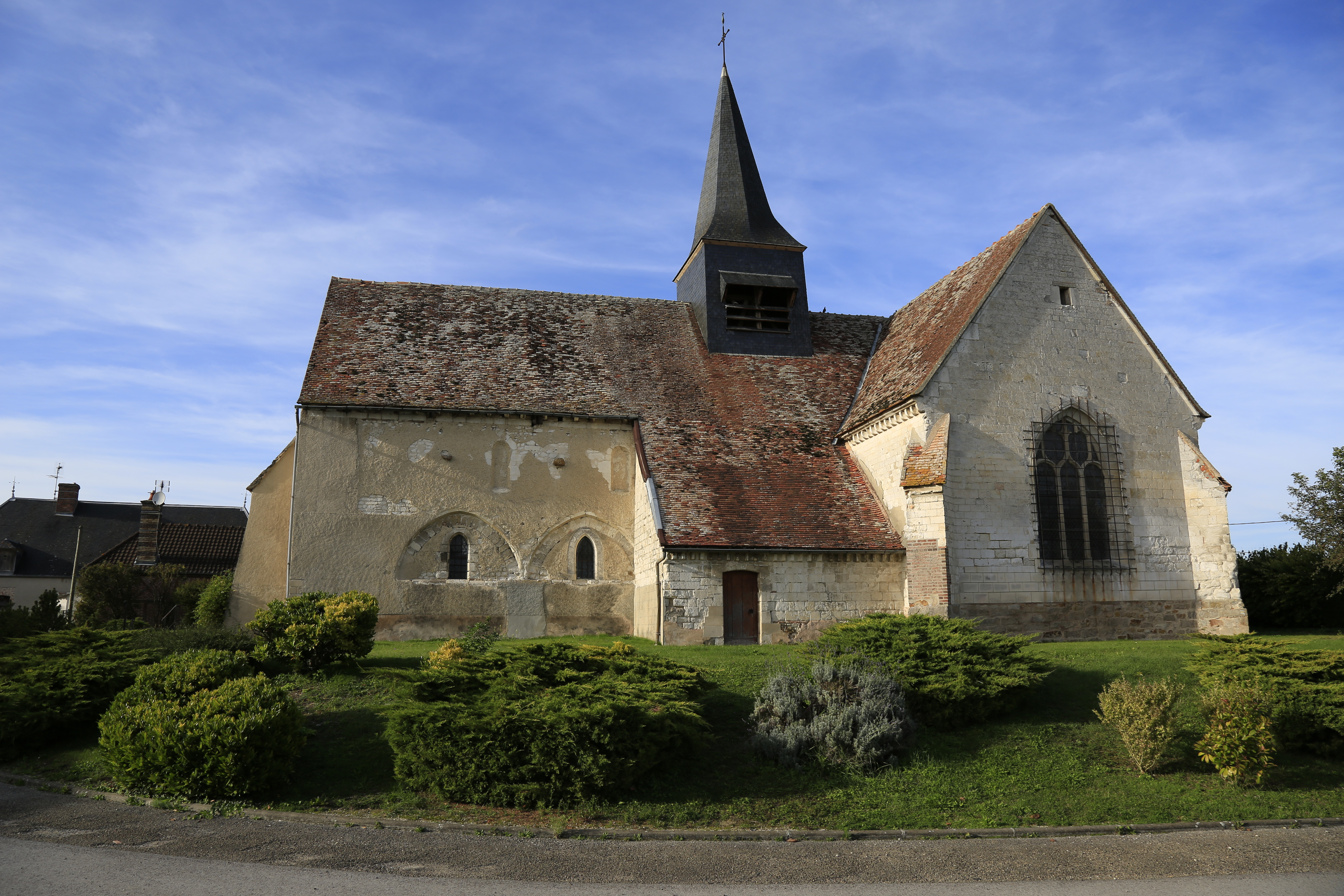
- The church in Vallant-Saint-Georges
- Location of Vallant-Saint-Georges
- Location within France Location within Grand Est
- Coordinates: 48°28′13″N 3°54′14″E
- Country: France
- Region: Grand Est
- Department: Aube
- Arrondissement: Nogent-sur-Seine
- Canton: Creney-près-Troyes

Government
  - Mayor (2020–2026): Jean-Claude Marion
- Area^{1}: 17.86 km^{2} (6.90 sq mi)
- Elevation: 85 m (279 ft)
- Population (2023): 408
  - Density: 22.8/km^{2} (59.2/sq mi)
- Time zone: UTC+01:00 (CET)
  - Summer (DST): UTC+02:00 (CEST)
- INSEE/Postal code: 10392 /10170
- ^{1} French Land Register data, which excludes lakes, ponds, glaciers > 1 km^{2} (0.386 sq mi or 247 acres) and river estuaries.

Vallant-Saint-Georges is a commune in the Aube department in north-central France.

== Population ==
Historical population
Year	Pop.	±% p.a.
1968	418	—
1975	406	−0.42%
1982	407	+0.04%
1990	378	−0.92%
1999	354	−0.73%
2007	380	+0.89%
2012	387	+0.37%
2017	384	−0.16%
2023	408	+1.02%
Source: INSEE

== See also ==
- Communes of the Aube department
