= Petit-Mesnil =

Commune in Grand Est, France

- Commune
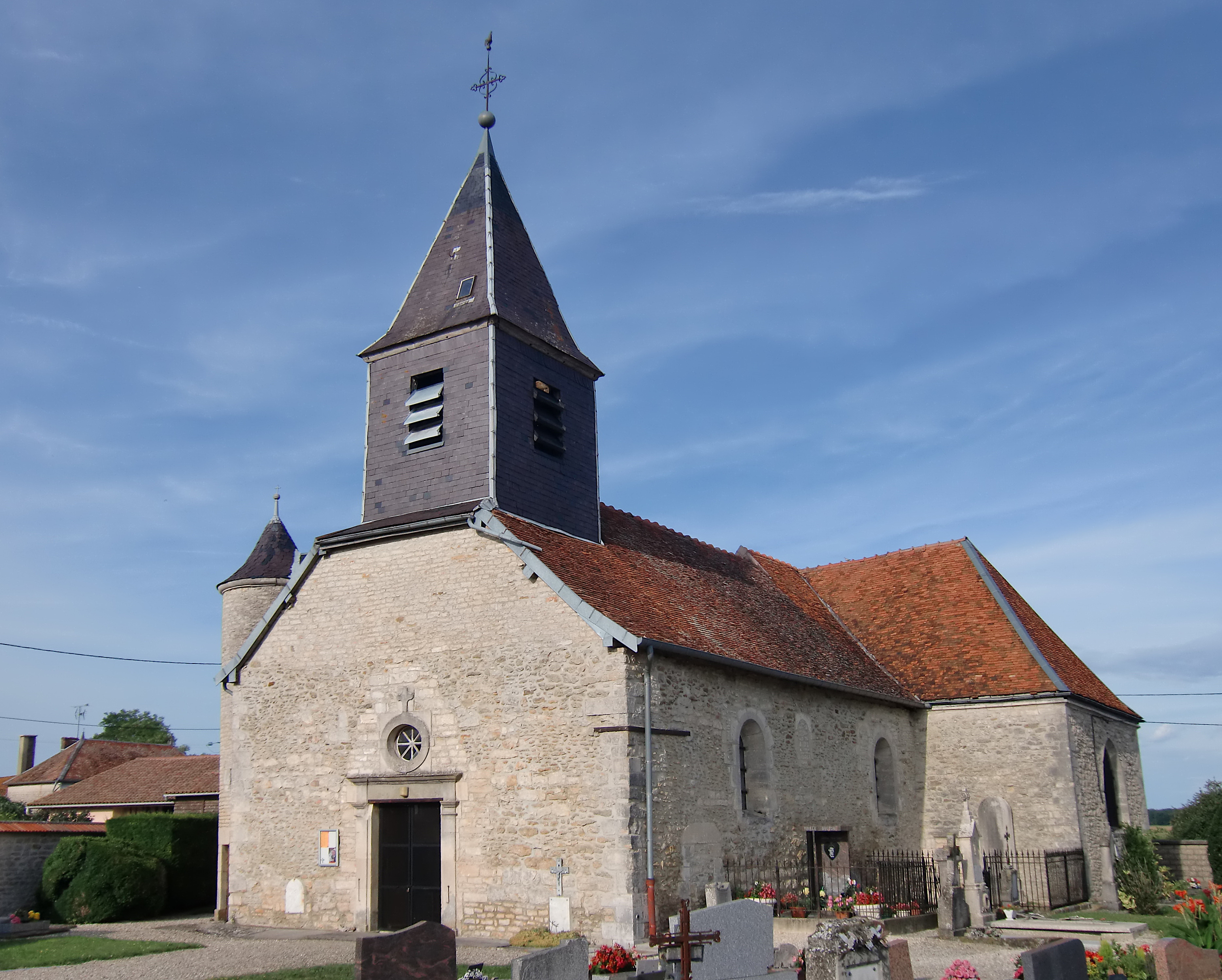
- The church in Petit-Mesnil
- Location of Petit-Mesnil
- Location within France Location within Grand Est
- Coordinates: 48°20′58″N 4°35′17″E
- Country: France
- Region: Grand Est
- Department: Aube
- Arrondissement: Bar-sur-Aube
- Canton: Bar-sur-Aube

Government
  - Mayor (2023–2026): Patrick Klein
- Area^{1}: 14.83 km^{2} (5.73 sq mi)
- Elevation: 153 m (502 ft)
- Population (2023): 203
  - Density: 13.7/km^{2} (35.5/sq mi)
- Time zone: UTC+01:00 (CET)
  - Summer (DST): UTC+02:00 (CEST)
- INSEE/Postal code: 10286 /10500
- ^{1} French Land Register data, which excludes lakes, ponds, glaciers > 1 km^{2} (0.386 sq mi or 247 acres) and river estuaries.

Petit-Mesnil (French pronunciation: [pəti mɛnil]) is a commune in the Aube department in north-central France.

Surrounded by the municipalities of La Rothiere, Chaumesnil and Éclance, Petit-Mesnil is located 38 km northeast of Troyes, the largest nearby city.

== Population ==
Historical population
Year	Pop.	±% p.a.
1968	176	—
1975	154	−1.89%
1982	196	+3.51%
1990	213	+1.05%
1999	215	+0.10%
2007	233	+1.01%
2012	235	+0.17%
2017	216	−1.67%
2023	203	−1.03%
Source: INSEE

== See also ==
- Communes of the Aube department
