= Saulcy =

Saulcy may refer to:

== Places ==
- Saulcy, Switzerland, a municipality in the canton of Jura, Switzerland
- Saulcy, Aube, a commune in the Aube department, France
- Saulcy-sur-Meurthe, a commune in the Vosges department, France

== People ==
- Félicien Henry Caignart de Saulcy (1832-1912), French entomologist
- Louis Félicien de Saulcy (1807–1880), French numismatist, Orientalist, and archaeologist
