= Arconville =

Commune in Grand Est, France

- Commune
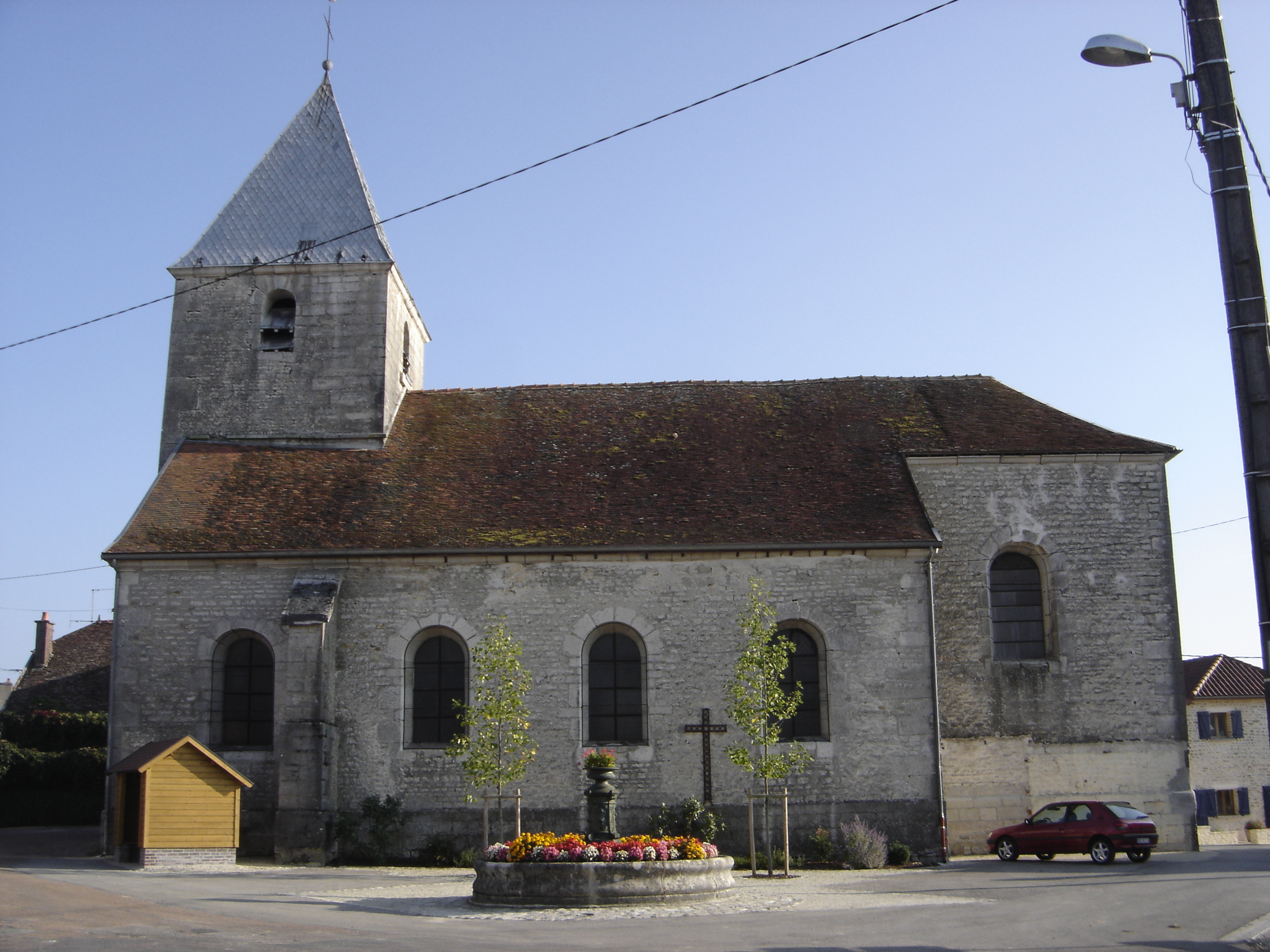
- Arconville Church
- Location of Arconville
- Location within France Location within Grand Est
- Coordinates: 48°09′48″N 4°43′24″E
- Country: France
- Region: Grand Est
- Department: Aube
- Arrondissement: Bar-sur-Aube
- Canton: Bar-sur-Aube
- Intercommunality: Région de Bar-sur-Aube

Government
  - Mayor (2020–2026): Guillaume Gaucher
- Area^{1}: 15 km^{2} (5.8 sq mi)
- Elevation: 306 m (1,004 ft)
- Population (2023): 108
  - Density: 7.2/km^{2} (19/sq mi)
- Time zone: UTC+01:00 (CET)
  - Summer (DST): UTC+02:00 (CEST)
- INSEE/Postal code: 10007 /10200
- ^{1} French Land Register data, which excludes lakes, ponds, glaciers > 1 km^{2} (0.386 sq mi or 247 acres) and river estuaries.

Arconville (French pronunciation: [aʁkɔ̃vil]) is a commune in the Aube department in the Grand Est region of north-central France.

== Geography ==
Arconville is located some 60 km east by south-east of Troyes and 36 km west by north-west of Chaumont. Access to the commune is by road D101 from Bergères in the west passing through the commune and the village and continuing east to join the D12 west of Longchamp-sur-Aujon. The D12 forms most of the southern border of the commune as it goes from Champignol-lez-Mondeville to Longchamp-sur-Aujon. The D70 road also passes south through the west of the commune from Baroville in the north to Champignol-lez-Mondeville in the south-west. The east of the commune is heavily forested with forests in the south-west and north-west as well. The rest of the commune is farmland.

== Administration ==
List of Successive Mayors

From	To	Name	Party
	1857	Thivet	
2001	2008	Jolène Colney	
2008		Gilles Bonnevie	
2014	2020	Guillaume Gaucher	
2020	2026	Chrystelle Rondelet	
2026	Incumbent	Guillaume Rondelet	

== Population ==
The inhabitants of the commune are known as Arconvillois or Arconvilloises in French.

Historical population
Year	Pop.	±% p.a.
1968	148	—
1975	104	−4.92%
1982	123	+2.43%
1990	162	+3.50%
1999	148	−1.00%
2007	118	−2.79%
2012	113	−0.86%
2017	105	−1.46%
2023	108	+0.47%
Source: INSEE

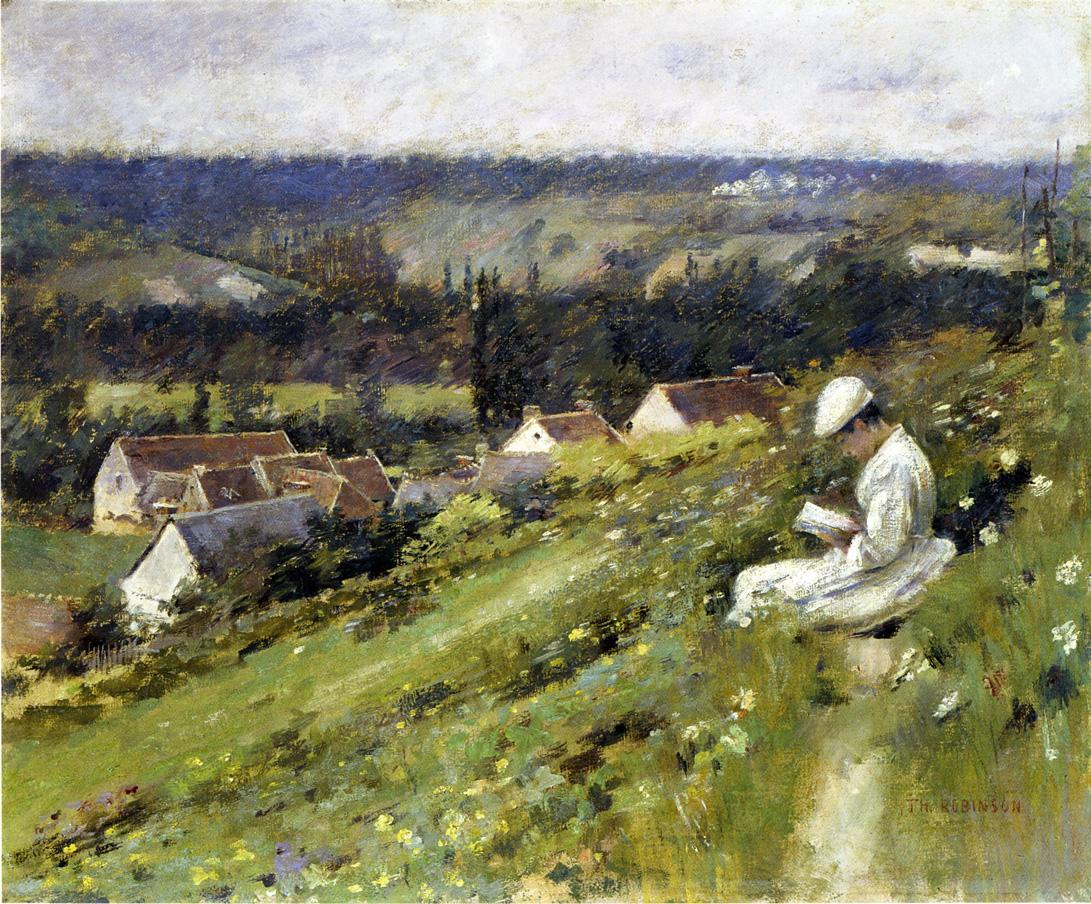
A 19th-century painting of the Valley of Arconville by Theodore Robinson

== Sites and monuments ==
- The old Fraville Barn (13th century) is registered as an historical monument.
- A Hall church from the 18th century, inter-denominational, dedicated to Saint Martin

The church contains many items that are registered as historical objects:

- A Statue: Saint Eloi (18th century)
- A Poutre de Gloire (Beam of Glory) (18th century)
- A Painting: Charity of Saint Martin (1846)
- A Painting: Rosary (19th century)
- The main Altar Tabernacle and Retable (18th century)
- The Retable in the Altar of Saint Vierge (17th century)
- A Statue: Saint Robert (1840)
- A Statue: Virgin and child (1840)
- 2 Statuettes: Saints Nicolas and Martin (18th century)
- A Chalice with Paten (19th century)
- The Step to the Altar (19th century)
- A Celebrant's Chair (19th century)
- A Processional Staff: Saint Martin (18th century)
- An Altar Painting: Saint Nicolas (18th century)
- A Statuette from the Processional Staff: Virgin and child (18th century)
- Wood Panelling (18th century)
- A Statue: Christ on the Cross (16th century)
- A Processional Staff: Saint Nicolas (19th century)
- The Furniture in the Church

== Notable people ==
- Théophile Nicolas Noblot (1824–1891), politician

== See also ==
- Communes of the Aube department
