= Spoy =

Spoy may refer to the following places in France:

- Spoy, Aube, a commune in the department of Aube
- Spoy, Côte-d'Or, a commune in the department of Côte-d'Or
