= Meurville =

Commune in Grand Est, France

- Commune
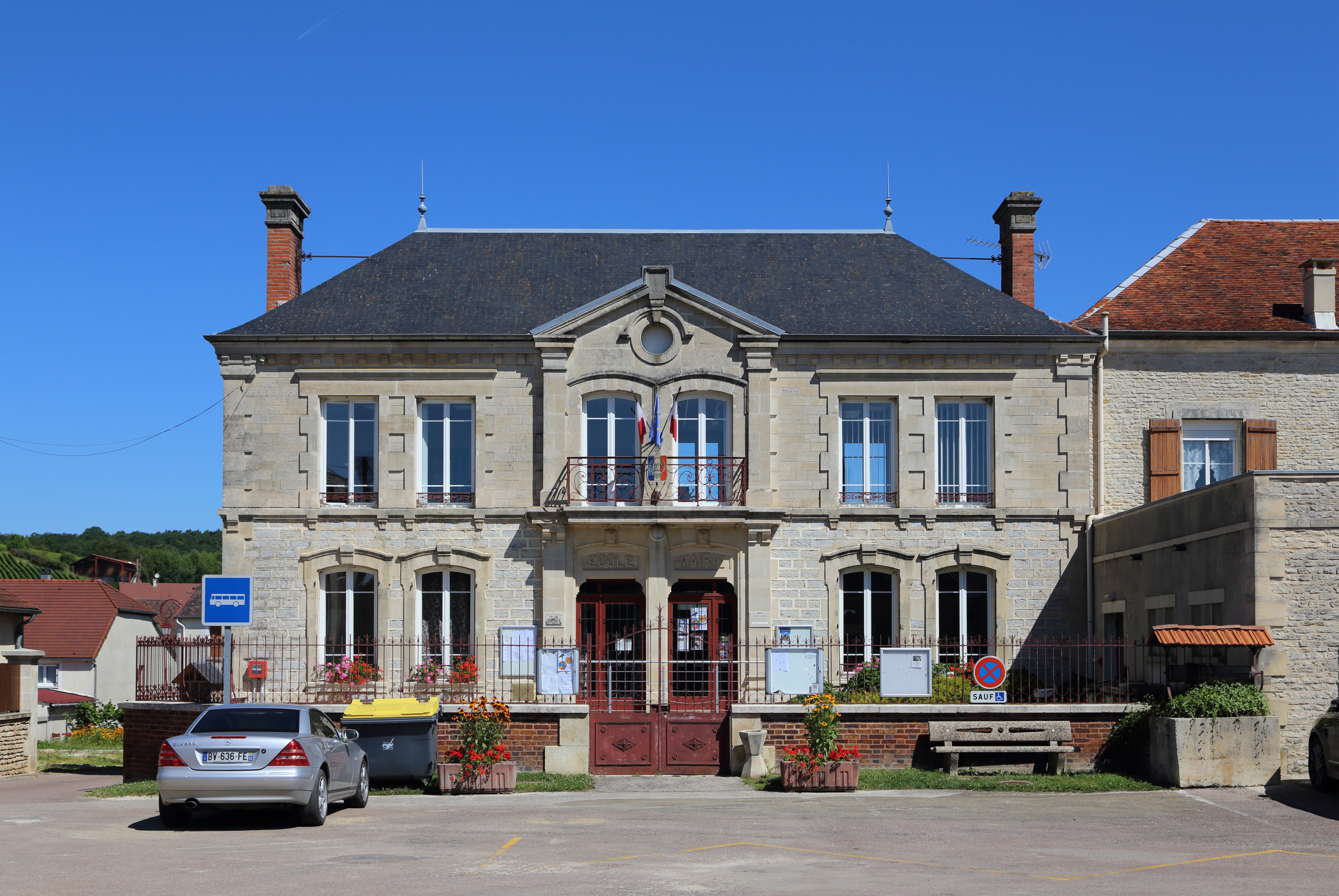
- The town hall in Meurville
- Location of Meurville
- Location within France Location within Grand Est
- Coordinates: 48°12′11″N 4°37′28″E
- Country: France
- Region: Grand Est
- Department: Aube
- Arrondissement: Bar-sur-Aube
- Canton: Bar-sur-Aube
- Intercommunality: Région de Bar-sur-Aube

Government
  - Mayor (2020–2026): Odile Borde
- Area^{1}: 16.35 km^{2} (6.31 sq mi)
- Elevation: 200 m (660 ft)
- Population (2023): 151
  - Density: 9.24/km^{2} (23.9/sq mi)
- Time zone: UTC+01:00 (CET)
  - Summer (DST): UTC+02:00 (CEST)
- INSEE/Postal code: 10242 /10200
- ^{1} French Land Register data, which excludes lakes, ponds, glaciers > 1 km^{2} (0.386 sq mi or 247 acres) and river estuaries.

Meurville is a commune in the Aube department in north-central France.

== Population ==
Historical population
Year	Pop.	±% p.a.
1968	202	—
1975	180	−1.63%
1982	187	+0.55%
1990	204	+1.09%
1999	177	−1.57%
2007	180	+0.21%
2012	180	+0.00%
2017	173	−0.79%
2023	151	−2.24%
Source: INSEE

== See also ==
- Communes of the Aube department
