= Ville-sur-Terre =

Commune in Grand Est, France

- Commune
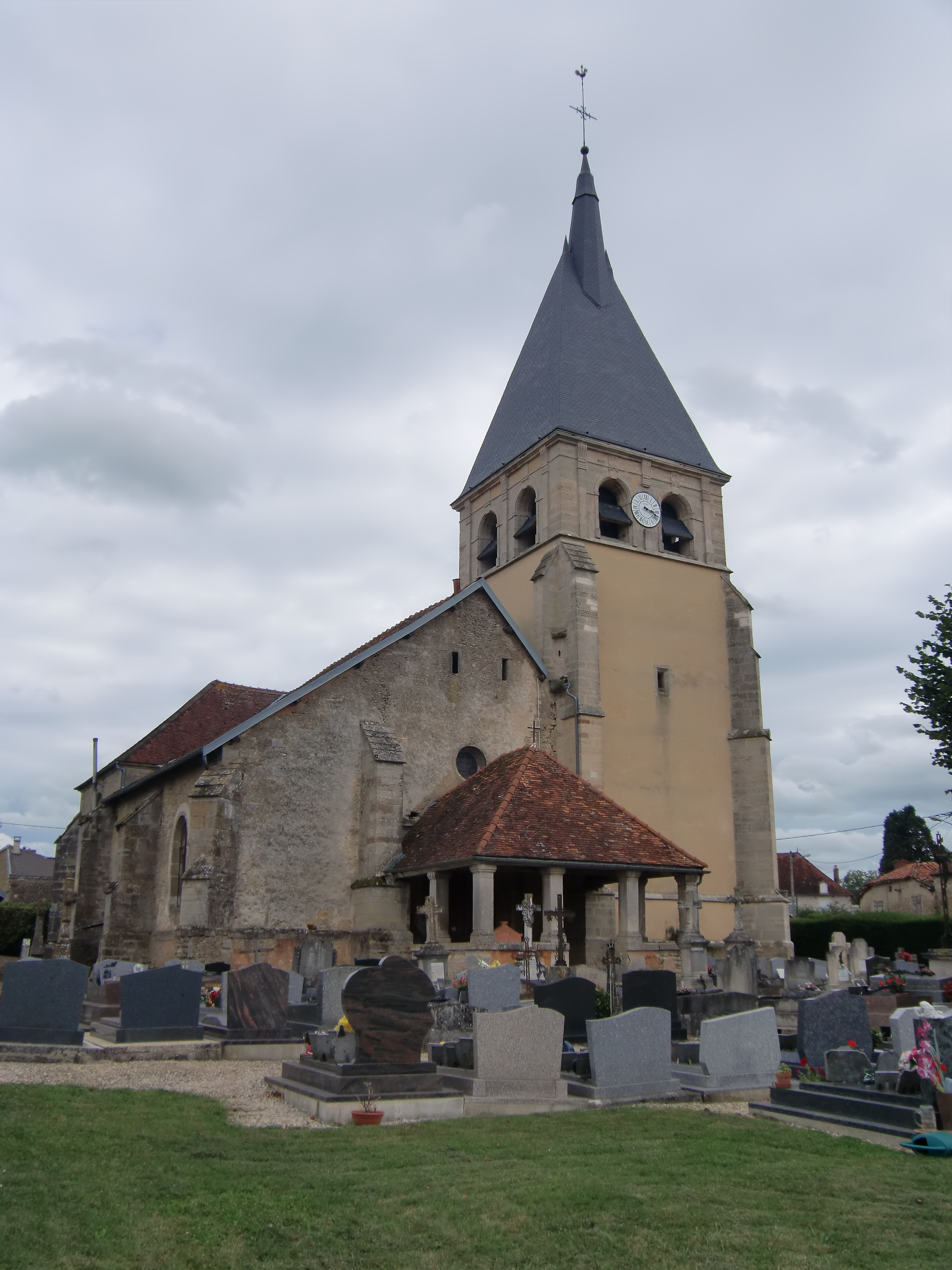
- The church in Ville-sur-Terre
- Location of Ville-sur-Terre
- Location within France Location within Grand Est
- Coordinates: 48°19′58″N 4°44′55″E
- Country: France
- Region: Grand Est
- Department: Aube
- Arrondissement: Bar-sur-Aube
- Canton: Bar-sur-Aube

Government
  - Mayor (2020–2026): Pascal Dematons
- Area^{1}: 16.1 km^{2} (6.2 sq mi)
- Elevation: 186 m (610 ft)
- Population (2023): 96
  - Density: 6.0/km^{2} (15/sq mi)
- Time zone: UTC+01:00 (CET)
  - Summer (DST): UTC+02:00 (CEST)
- INSEE/Postal code: 10428 /10200
- ^{1} French Land Register data, which excludes lakes, ponds, glaciers > 1 km^{2} (0.386 sq mi or 247 acres) and river estuaries.

Ville-sur-Terre is a commune in the Aube department in north-central France.

== Population ==
Historical population
Year	Pop.	±% p.a.
1968	204	—
1975	174	−2.25%
1982	165	−0.76%
1990	138	−2.21%
1999	142	+0.32%
2007	137	−0.45%
2012	107	−4.82%
2017	103	−0.76%
2023	96	−1.17%
Source: INSEE

== See also ==
- Communes of the Aube department
