= Fravaux =

Commune in Grand Est, France

- Commune
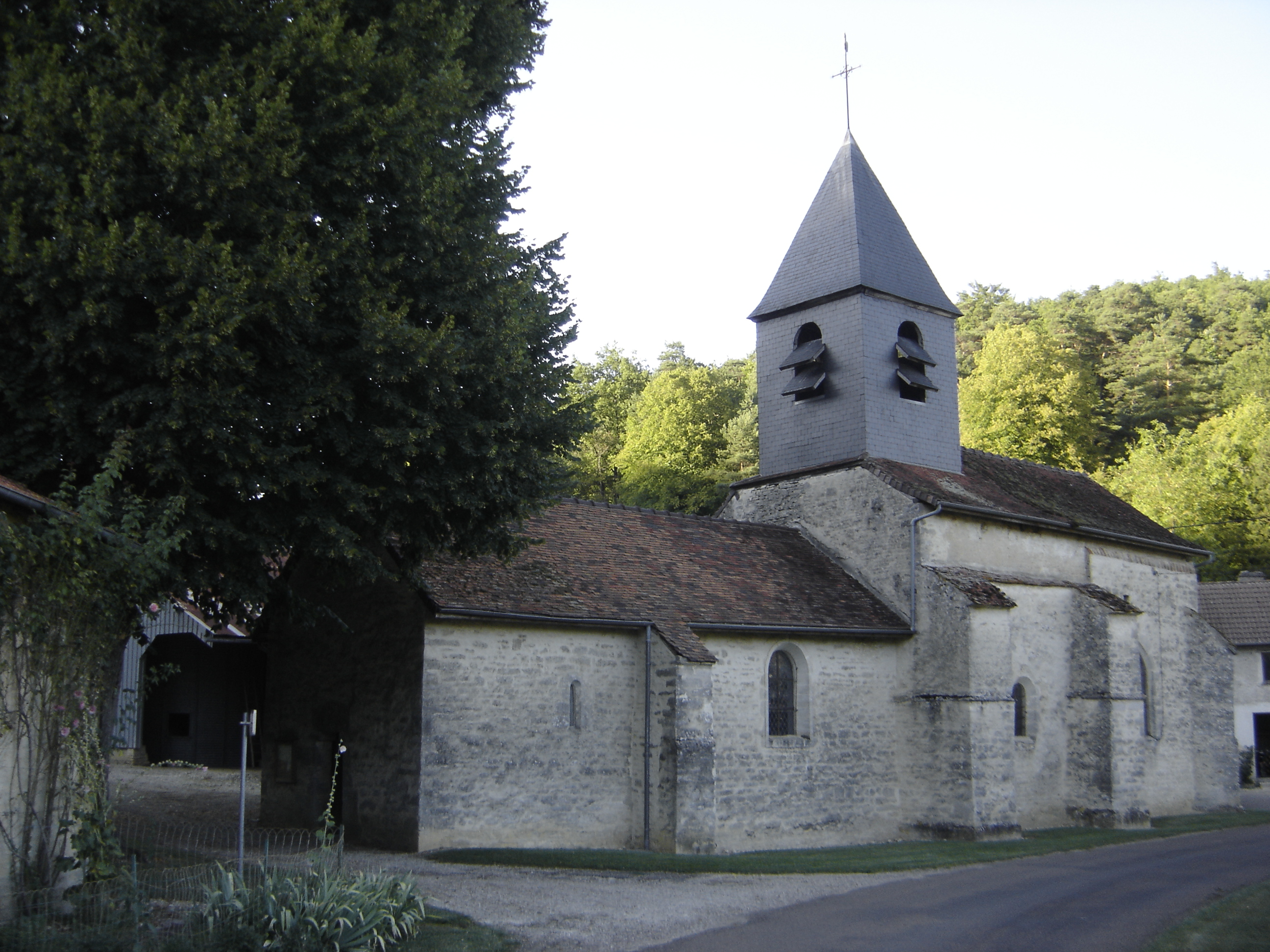
- The church in Fravaux
- Location of Fravaux
- Location within France Location within Grand Est
- Coordinates: 48°14′19″N 4°38′21″E
- Country: France
- Region: Grand Est
- Department: Aube
- Arrondissement: Bar-sur-Aube
- Canton: Bar-sur-Aube
- Intercommunality: Région de Bar-sur-Aube

Government
  - Mayor (2020–2026): David Lelubre
- Area^{1}: 3.72 km^{2} (1.44 sq mi)
- Elevation: 197 m (646 ft)
- Population (2023): 36
  - Density: 9.7/km^{2} (25/sq mi)
- Time zone: UTC+01:00 (CET)
  - Summer (DST): UTC+02:00 (CEST)
- INSEE/Postal code: 10160 /10200
- ^{1} French Land Register data, which excludes lakes, ponds, glaciers > 1 km^{2} (0.386 sq mi or 247 acres) and river estuaries.

Fravaux (French pronunciation: [fʁavo]) is a commune in the Aube department in north-central France.

== Population ==
Historical population
Year	Pop.	±% p.a.
1968	40	—
1975	46	+2.02%
1982	34	−4.23%
1990	47	+4.13%
1999	57	+2.17%
2007	51	−1.38%
2012	53	+0.77%
2017	47	−2.37%
2023	36	−4.35%
Source: INSEE

== See also ==
- Communes of the Aube department
