= Thil, Aube =

Commune in Grand Est, France

Thil
- Commune
- Location of Thil
- Location within France Location within Grand Est
- Coordinates: 48°20′54″N 4°47′11″E
- Country: France
- Region: Grand Est
- Department: Aube
- Arrondissement: Bar-sur-Aube
- Canton: Bar-sur-Aube

Government
  - Mayor (2020–2026): Francis Fels
- Area^{1}: 19.42 km^{2} (7.50 sq mi)
- Elevation: 185 m (607 ft)
- Population (2023): 103
  - Density: 5.30/km^{2} (13.7/sq mi)
- Time zone: UTC+01:00 (CET)
  - Summer (DST): UTC+02:00 (CEST)
- INSEE/Postal code: 10377 /10200
- ^{1} French Land Register data, which excludes lakes, ponds, glaciers > 1 km^{2} (0.386 sq mi or 247 acres) and river estuaries.

Thil (French pronunciation: [til]) is a commune in the Aube department in north-central France.

== Population ==
Historical population
Year	Pop.	±% p.a.
1968	195	—
1975	161	−2.70%
1982	157	−0.36%
1990	120	−3.30%
1999	138	+1.57%
2007	159	+1.79%
2012	147	−1.56%
2017	114	−4.96%
2023	103	−1.68%
Source: INSEE

== See also ==
- Communes of the Aube department
