= Lignol-le-Château =

Commune in Grand Est, France

- Commune
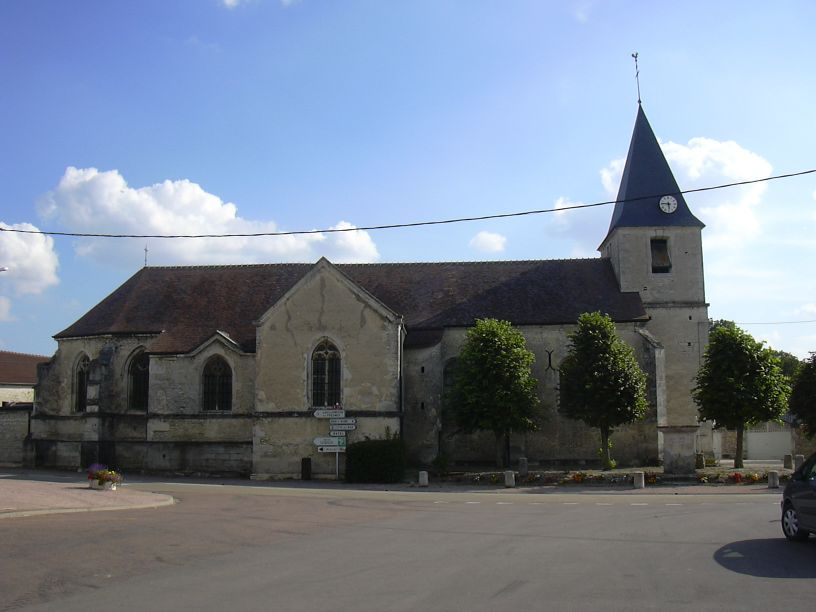
- The church in Lignol-le-Château
- Location of Lignol-le-Château
- Location within France Location within Grand Est
- Coordinates: 48°13′28″N 4°48′30″E
- Country: France
- Region: Grand Est
- Department: Aube
- Arrondissement: Bar-sur-Aube
- Canton: Bar-sur-Aube
- Intercommunality: Région de Bar-sur-Aube

Government
  - Mayor (2020–2026): Bernard Piot
- Area^{1}: 21.85 km^{2} (8.44 sq mi)
- Elevation: 271 m (889 ft)
- Population (2023): 155
  - Density: 7.09/km^{2} (18.4/sq mi)
- Demonym(s): Lignolais, Lignolaises
- Time zone: UTC+01:00 (CET)
  - Summer (DST): UTC+02:00 (CEST)
- INSEE/Postal code: 10197 /10200
- ^{1} French Land Register data, which excludes lakes, ponds, glaciers > 1 km^{2} (0.386 sq mi or 247 acres) and river estuaries.

Lignol-le-Château (French pronunciation: [liɲɔl lə ʃɑto]) is a commune in the Aube department in north-central France.

== Population ==
Historical population
Year	Pop.	±% p.a.
1968	220	—
1975	252	+1.96%
1982	227	−1.48%
1990	191	−2.14%
1999	176	−0.90%
2007	204	+1.86%
2012	196	−0.80%
2017	199	+0.30%
2023	155	−4.08%
Source: INSEE

== See also ==
- Communes of the Aube department
