= Rouvres-les-Vignes =

Commune in Grand Est, France

- Commune
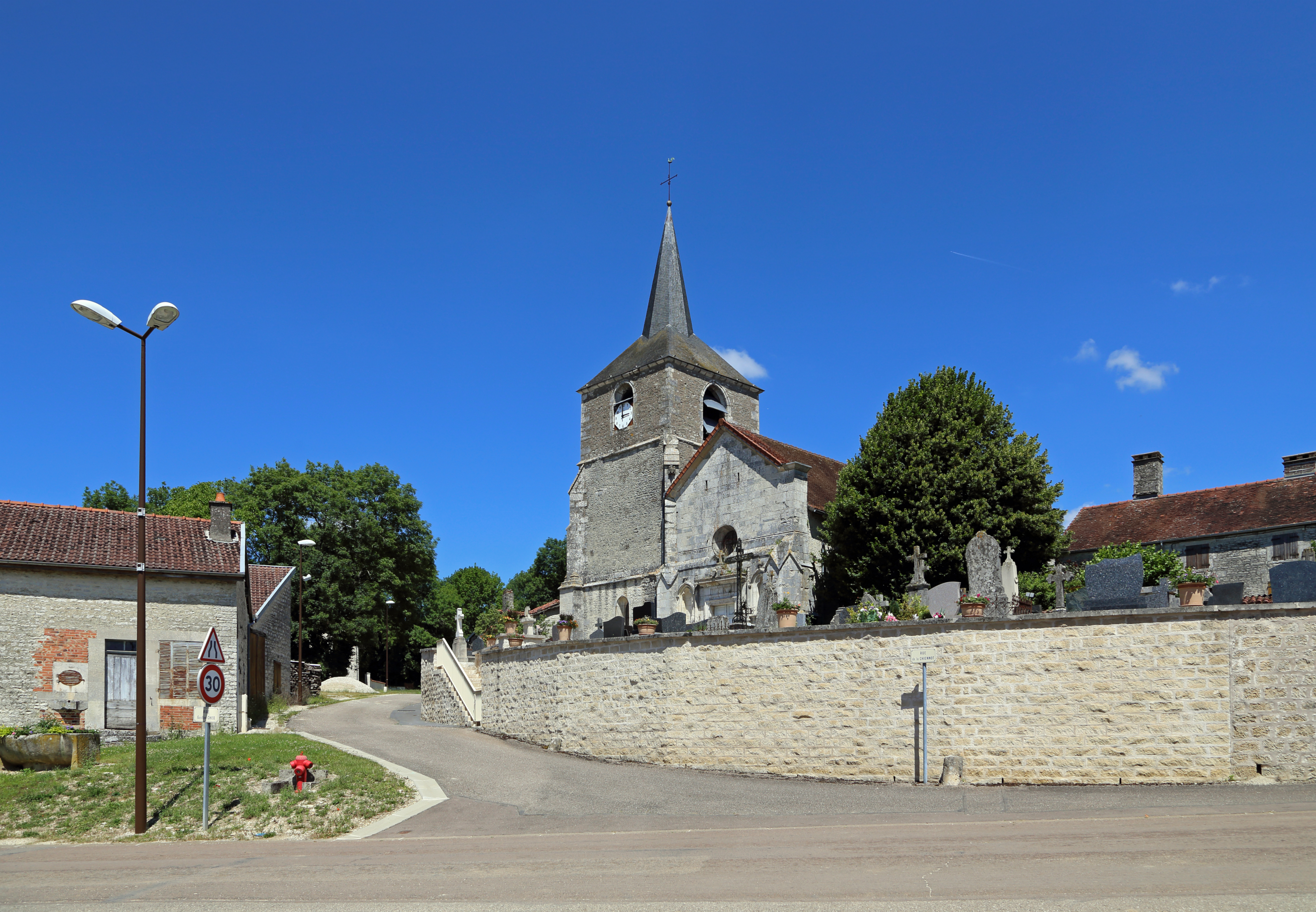
- The church in Rouvres-les-Vignes
- Location of Rouvres-les-Vignes
- Location within France Location within Grand Est
- Coordinates: 48°14′30″N 4°49′25″E
- Country: France
- Region: Grand Est
- Department: Aube
- Arrondissement: Bar-sur-Aube
- Canton: Bar-sur-Aube
- Intercommunality: Région de Bar-sur-Aube

Government
  - Mayor (2020–2026): Michel Descharmes
- Area^{1}: 8.28 km^{2} (3.20 sq mi)
- Elevation: 251 m (823 ft)
- Population (2023): 115
  - Density: 13.9/km^{2} (36.0/sq mi)
- Time zone: UTC+01:00 (CET)
  - Summer (DST): UTC+02:00 (CEST)
- INSEE/Postal code: 10330 /10200
- ^{1} French Land Register data, which excludes lakes, ponds, glaciers > 1 km^{2} (0.386 sq mi or 247 acres) and river estuaries.

Rouvres-les-Vignes (French pronunciation: [ʁuvʁ le viɲ]) is a commune in the Aube department in north-central France.

== Population ==
Historical population
Year	Pop.	±% p.a.
1968	104	—
1975	103	−0.14%
1982	104	+0.14%
1990	112	+0.93%
1999	122	+0.95%
2007	128	+0.60%
2012	107	−3.52%
2017	106	−0.19%
2023	115	+1.37%
Source: INSEE

== See also ==
- Communes of the Aube department
