= Canton of Bar-sur-Aube =

Coordinates: 48.23°N 4.71°E

- Canton
- Situation of the canton of Bar-sur-Aube in the department of Aube
- Country: France
- Region: Grand Est
- Department: Aube
- No. of communes: {{{nbcomm}}}
- Population (2023): 12,852
- INSEE code: 1003

The canton of Bar-sur-Aube is an administrative division of the Aube department, northeastern France. Its borders were modified at the French canton reorganisation which came into effect in March 2015. Its seat is in Bar-sur-Aube.

It consists of the following communes:

1. Ailleville
2. Arconville
3. Arrentières
4. Arsonval
5. Baroville
6. Bar-sur-Aube
7. Bayel
8. Bergères
9. Bligny
10. La Chaise
11. Champignol-lez-Mondeville
12. Chaumesnil
13. Colombé-la-Fosse
14. Colombé-le-Sec
15. Couvignon
16. Crespy-le-Neuf
17. Éclance
18. Engente
19. Épothémont
20. Fontaine
21. Fravaux
22. Fresnay
23. Fuligny
24. Jaucourt
25. Juvancourt
26. Juzanvigny
27. Lévigny
28. Lignol-le-Château
29. Longchamp-sur-Aujon
30. Maisons-lès-Soulaines
31. Meurville
32. Montier-en-l'Isle
33. Morvilliers
34. Petit-Mesnil
35. Proverville
36. La Rothière
37. Rouvres-les-Vignes
38. Saulcy
39. Soulaines-Dhuys
40. Spoy
41. Thil
42. Thors
43. Urville
44. Vernonvilliers
45. La Ville-aux-Bois
46. Ville-sous-la-Ferté
47. Ville-sur-Terre
48. Voigny
