= Arsonval =

Commune in Grand Est, France

- Commune
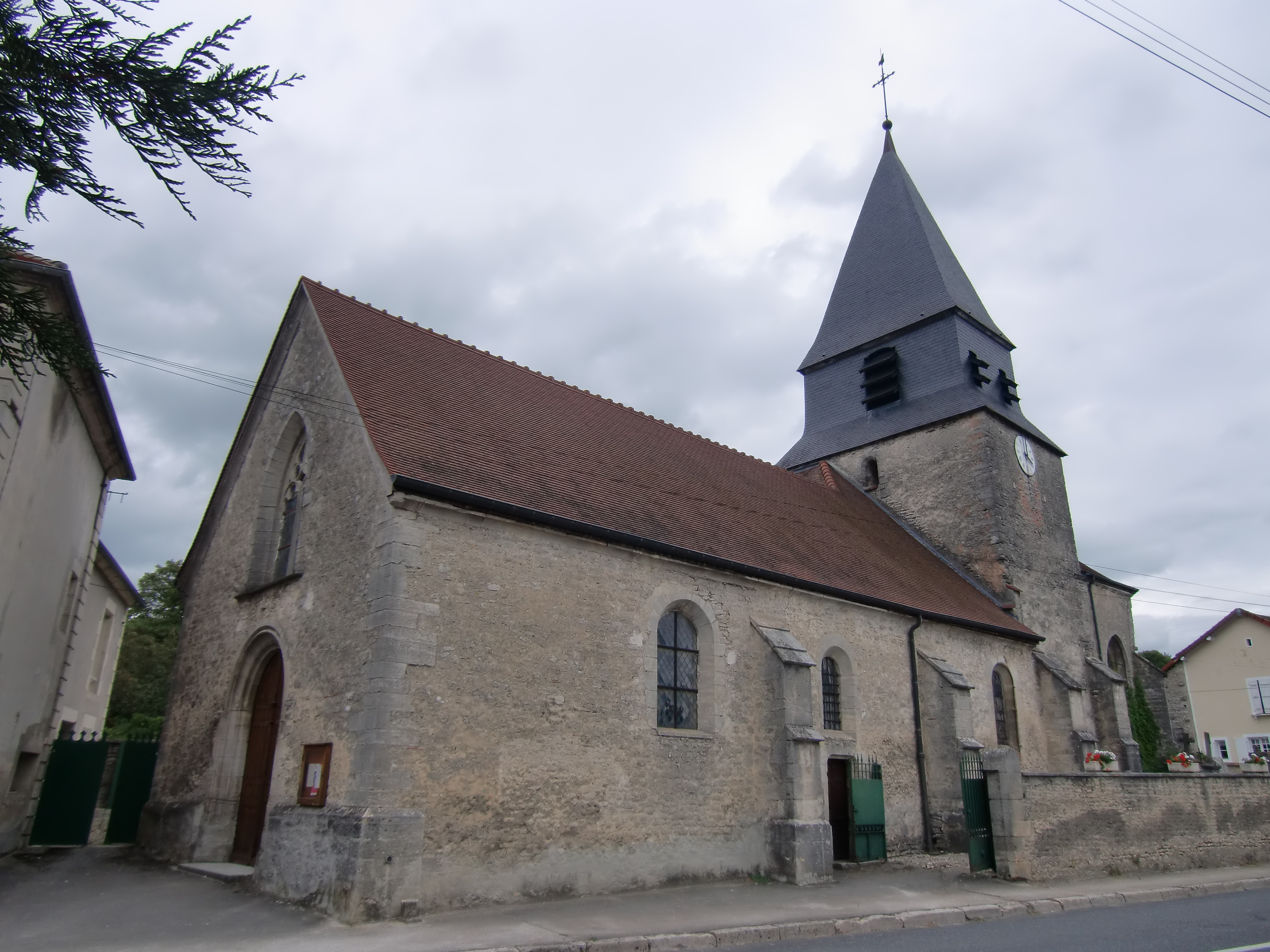
- The church in Arsonval

- Coat of arms
- Location of Arsonval
- Location within France Location within Grand Est
- Coordinates: 48°16′07″N 4°39′04″E
- Country: France
- Region: Grand Est
- Department: Aube
- Arrondissement: Bar-sur-Aube
- Canton: Bar-sur-Aube
- Intercommunality: CC Région Bar-sur-Aube

Government
  - Mayor (2024–2026): Mikaël Geoffroy
- Area^{1}: 7.58 km^{2} (2.93 sq mi)
- Elevation: 159 m (522 ft)
- Population (2023): 290
  - Density: 38/km^{2} (99/sq mi)
- Time zone: UTC+01:00 (CET)
  - Summer (DST): UTC+02:00 (CEST)
- INSEE/Postal code: 10012 /10200
- ^{1} French Land Register data, which excludes lakes, ponds, glaciers > 1 km^{2} (0.386 sq mi or 247 acres) and river estuaries.

Arsonval (French pronunciation: [aʁsɔ̃val]) is a commune in the Aube department in north-central France.

It lies on the right bank of the river Aube, about 30 miles (48 km) east of Troyes. It has a church dating from the twelfth century.

== Administration ==
List of mayors

From	To	Name	Party	Position
/1857		Elysée Mutinot		
2001	2008	David Rosselle		
2008		Jean-Pierre Moeurs		
2014	2020	Sophie Bastien		
2020	2026	Guy Spitz		
15 March 2026		Mikaël Geoffroy		

== Population ==
Historical population
Year	Pop.	±% p.a.
1968	280	—
1975	320	+1.93%
1982	388	+2.79%
1990	365	−0.76%
1999	331	−1.08%
2007	334	+0.11%
2012	339	+0.30%
2017	322	−1.02%
2023	290	−1.73%
Source: INSEE

== Personalities ==
- Victor-Eugène Ardouin-Dumazet (born in 1852, died in 1940 at Arsonval) : journalist, author of "Voyage en France", tourist guides (in 60 volumes).

== See also ==
- Communes of the Aube department
- Jacques-Arsène d'Arsonval inventor of the d'Arsonval Galvanometer
