= Bligny, Aube =

Commune in Grand Est, France

Bligny
- Commune
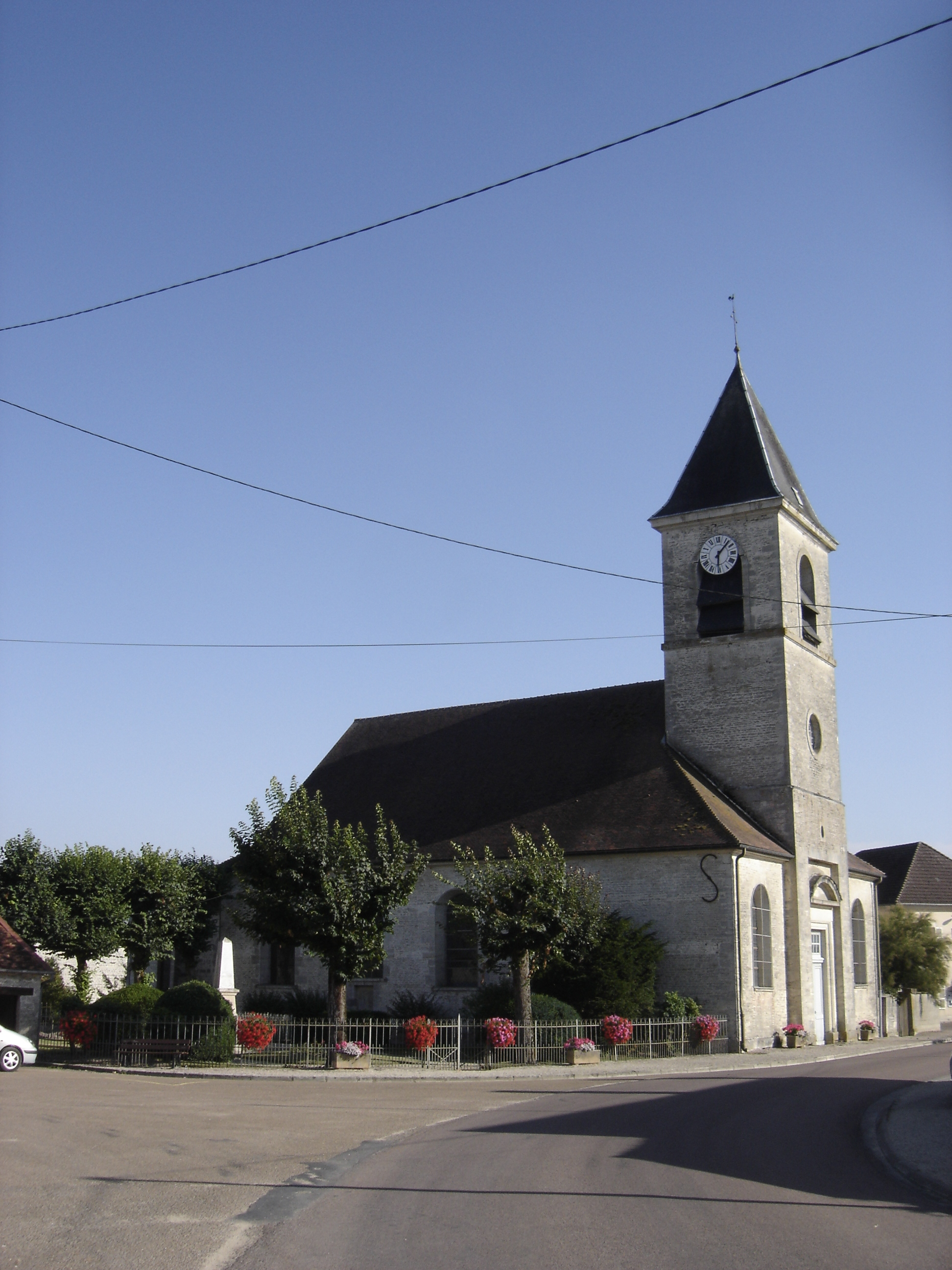
- The church in Bligny
- Location of Bligny
- Location within France Location within Grand Est
- Coordinates: 48°10′21″N 4°37′02″E
- Country: France
- Region: Grand Est
- Department: Aube
- Arrondissement: Bar-sur-Aube
- Canton: Bar-sur-Aube

Government
  - Mayor (2020–2026): Thierry Lorin
- Area^{1}: 22.74 km^{2} (8.78 sq mi)
- Elevation: 242 m (794 ft)
- Population (2023): 160
  - Density: 7.0/km^{2} (18/sq mi)
- Time zone: UTC+01:00 (CET)
  - Summer (DST): UTC+02:00 (CEST)
- INSEE/Postal code: 10048 /10200
- ^{1} French Land Register data, which excludes lakes, ponds, glaciers > 1 km^{2} (0.386 sq mi or 247 acres) and river estuaries.

Bligny (French pronunciation: [bliɲi]) is a commune in the Aube department in north-central France.

== Population ==
Historical population
Year	Pop.	±% p.a.
1968	177	—
1975	174	−0.24%
1982	193	+1.49%
1990	204	+0.70%
1999	208	+0.22%
2007	207	−0.06%
2012	193	−1.39%
2017	160	−3.68%
2023	160	+0.00%
Source: INSEE

== See also ==
- Communes of the Aube department
