= Juvancourt =

Commune in Grand Est, France

- Commune
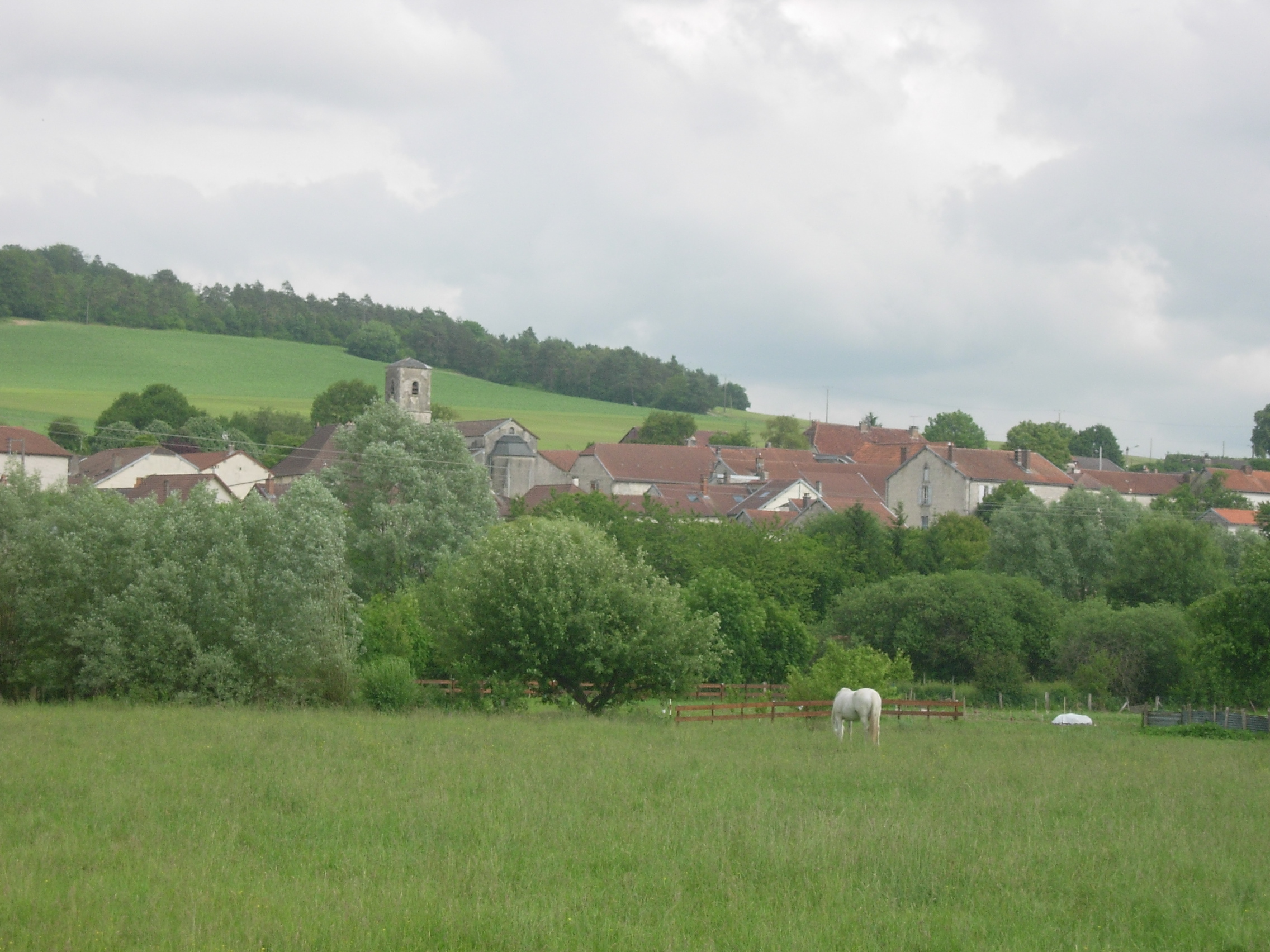
- A general view of Juvancourt
- Location of Juvancourt
- Location within France Location within Grand Est
- Coordinates: 48°06′56″N 4°47′59″E
- Country: France
- Region: Grand Est
- Department: Aube
- Arrondissement: Bar-sur-Aube
- Canton: Bar-sur-Aube
- Intercommunality: Région de Bar-sur-Aube

Government
  - Mayor (2020–2026): Olivier Henquinbrant
- Area^{1}: 8.29 km^{2} (3.20 sq mi)
- Elevation: 330 m (1,080 ft)
- Population (2023): 102
  - Density: 12.3/km^{2} (31.9/sq mi)
- Time zone: UTC+01:00 (CET)
  - Summer (DST): UTC+02:00 (CEST)
- INSEE/Postal code: 10182 /10310
- ^{1} French Land Register data, which excludes lakes, ponds, glaciers > 1 km^{2} (0.386 sq mi or 247 acres) and river estuaries.

Juvancourt (French pronunciation: [ʒyvɑ̃kuʁ]) is a commune in the Aube department in north-central France.

== Population ==
Historical population
Year	Pop.	±% p.a.
1968	151	—
1975	167	+1.45%
1982	153	−1.24%
1990	165	+0.95%
1999	148	−1.20%
2007	163	+1.21%
2012	126	−5.02%
2017	122	−0.64%
2023	102	−2.94%
Source: INSEE

Its inhabitants are called Juvancourtois.

== See also ==
- Communes of the Aube department
