= Montier-en-l'Isle =

Commune in Grand Est, France

- Commune
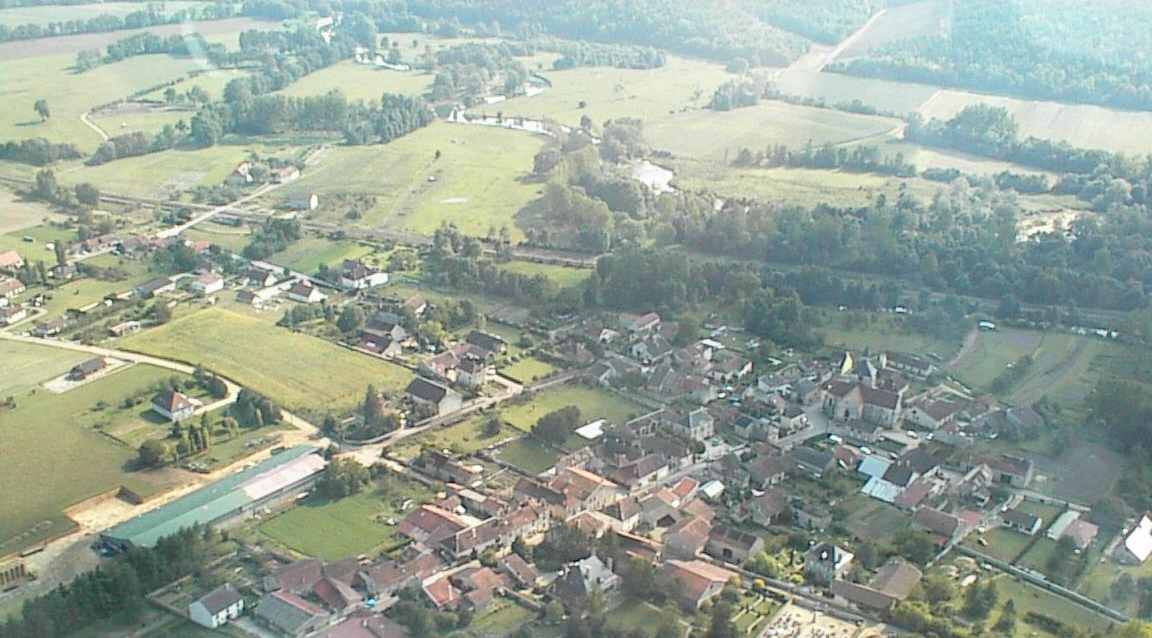
- An aerial view of Montier-en-l'Isle
- Location of Montier-en-l'Isle
- Location within France Location within Grand Est
- Coordinates: 48°15′42″N 4°39′49″E
- Country: France
- Region: Grand Est
- Department: Aube
- Arrondissement: Bar-sur-Aube
- Canton: Bar-sur-Aube
- Intercommunality: Région de Bar-sur-Aube

Government
  - Mayor (2020–2026): Christophe Noblot
- Area^{1}: 10.55 km^{2} (4.07 sq mi)
- Elevation: 159 m (522 ft)
- Population (2023): 213
  - Density: 20.2/km^{2} (52.3/sq mi)
- Time zone: UTC+01:00 (CET)
  - Summer (DST): UTC+02:00 (CEST)
- INSEE/Postal code: 10250 /10200
- ^{1} French Land Register data, which excludes lakes, ponds, glaciers > 1 km^{2} (0.386 sq mi or 247 acres) and river estuaries.

Montier-en-l'Isle (French pronunciation: [mɔ̃tje ɑ̃ lil]) is a commune in the Aube department in north-central France.

== Population ==
Historical population
| Year | Pop. | ±% p.a. |
|---|---|---|
| 1968 | 204 | — |
| 1975 | 180 | −1.77% |
| 1982 | 165 | −1.24% |
| 1990 | 206 | +2.81% |
| 1999 | 235 | +1.47% |
| 2007 | 206 | −1.63% |
| 2012 | 210 | +0.39% |
| 2017 | 235 | +2.28% |
| 2023 | 213 | −1.62% |
Source: INSEE

== See also ==
- Communes of the Aube department
