= Crespy-le-Neuf =

Commune in Grand Est, France

- Commune
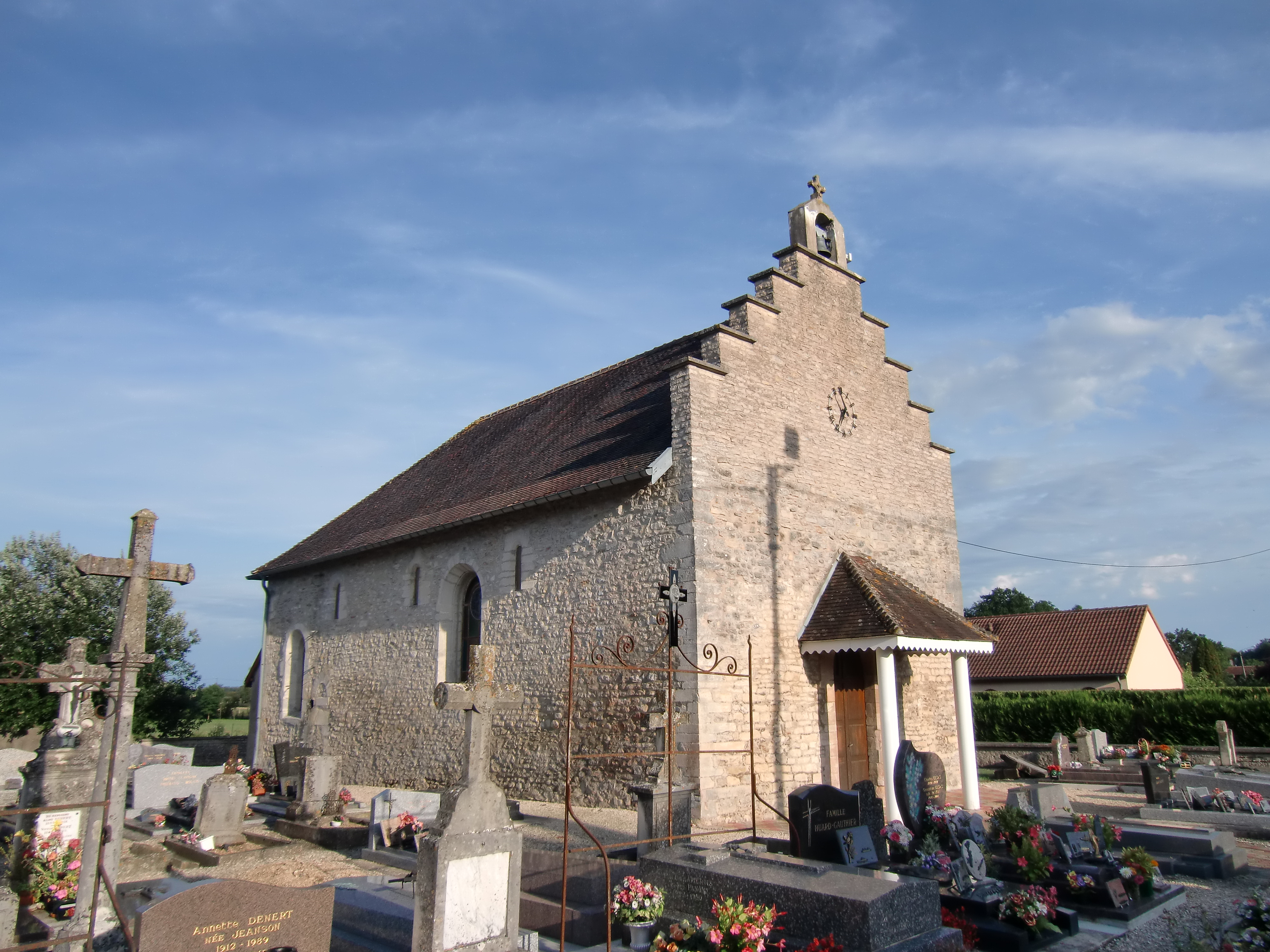
- The church in Crespy-le-Neuf
- Location of Crespy-le-Neuf
- Location within France Location within Grand Est
- Coordinates: 48°23′50″N 4°35′43″E
- Country: France
- Region: Grand Est
- Department: Aube
- Arrondissement: Bar-sur-Aube
- Canton: Bar-sur-Aube

Government
  - Mayor (2020–2026): Arnaud Cordelle
- Area^{1}: 10.19 km^{2} (3.93 sq mi)
- Elevation: 122 m (400 ft)
- Population (2023): 123
  - Density: 12.1/km^{2} (31.3/sq mi)
- Time zone: UTC+01:00 (CET)
  - Summer (DST): UTC+02:00 (CEST)
- INSEE/Postal code: 10117 /10500
- ^{1} French Land Register data, which excludes lakes, ponds, glaciers > 1 km^{2} (0.386 sq mi or 247 acres) and river estuaries.

Crespy-le-Neuf is a commune in the Aube department in north-central France.

== Population ==
Historical population
| Year | Pop. | ±% p.a. |
|---|---|---|
| 1968 | 161 | — |
| 1975 | 124 | −3.66% |
| 1982 | 130 | +0.68% |
| 1990 | 139 | +0.84% |
| 1999 | 146 | +0.55% |
| 2007 | 150 | +0.34% |
| 2012 | 146 | −0.54% |
| 2017 | 153 | +0.94% |
| 2023 | 123 | −3.57% |
Source: INSEE

== See also ==
- Communes of the Aube department
