= Proverville =

Commune in Grand Est, France

- Commune
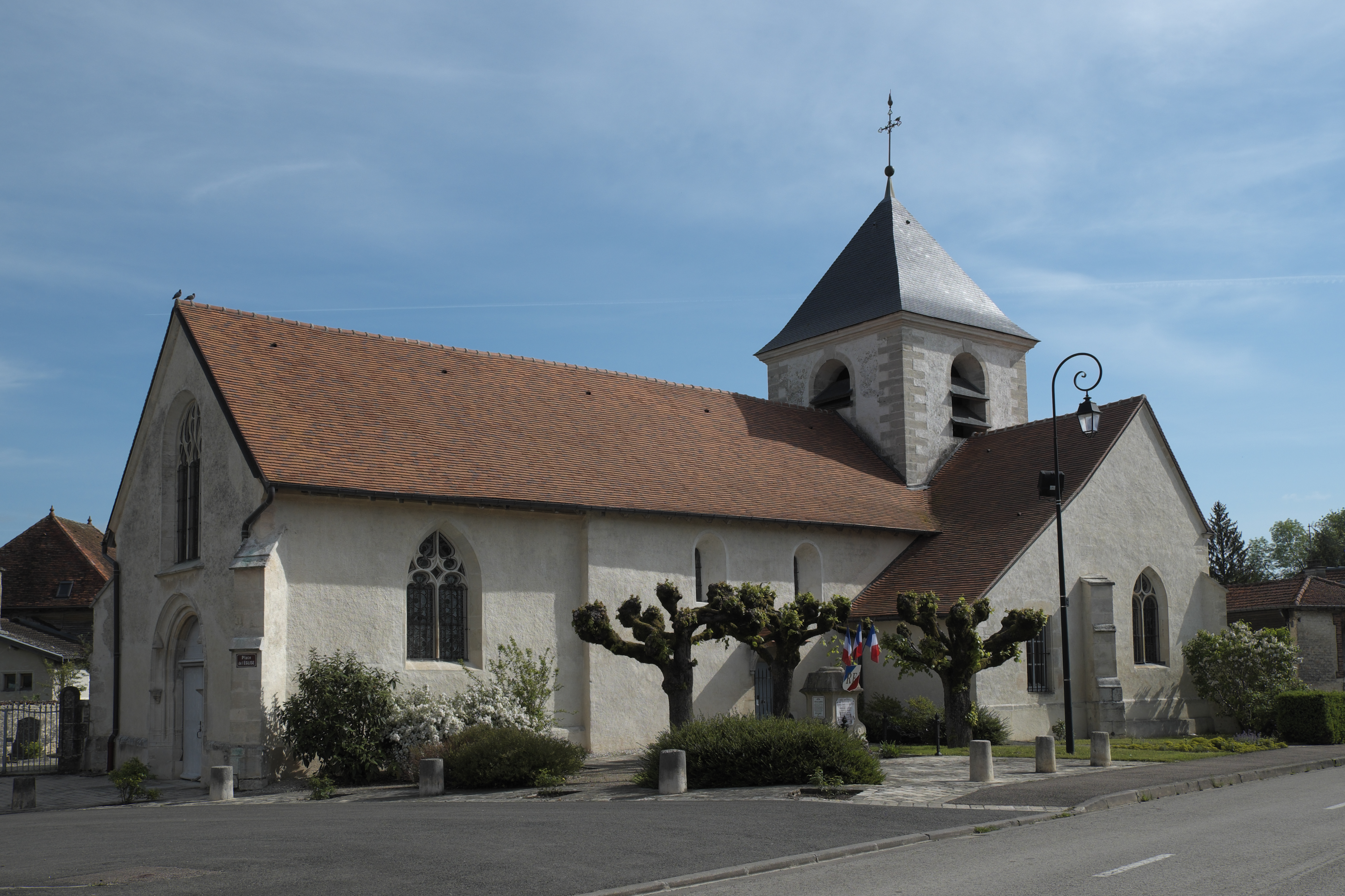
- The church in Proverville
- Location of Proverville
- Location within France Location within Grand Est
- Coordinates: 48°13′55″N 4°41′47″E
- Country: France
- Region: Grand Est
- Department: Aube
- Arrondissement: Bar-sur-Aube
- Canton: Bar-sur-Aube
- Intercommunality: Région de Bar-sur-Aube

Government
  - Mayor (2020–2026): Claude Petiot
- Area^{1}: 6.98 km^{2} (2.69 sq mi)
- Elevation: 60 m (200 ft)
- Population (2023): 217
  - Density: 31.1/km^{2} (80.5/sq mi)
- Time zone: UTC+01:00 (CET)
  - Summer (DST): UTC+02:00 (CEST)
- INSEE/Postal code: 10306 /10200
- ^{1} French Land Register data, which excludes lakes, ponds, glaciers > 1 km^{2} (0.386 sq mi or 247 acres) and river estuaries.

Proverville (French pronunciation: [pʁɔvɛʁvil]) is a commune in the Aube department in north-central France.

== Population ==
Historical population
Year	Pop.	±% p.a.
1968	304	—
1975	355	+2.24%
1982	331	−1.00%
1990	279	−2.11%
1999	292	+0.51%
2007	270	−0.97%
2012	242	−2.17%
2017	239	−0.25%
2023	217	−1.60%
Source: INSEE

== See also ==
- Communes of the Aube department
