= Juzanvigny =

Commune in Grand Est, France

- Commune
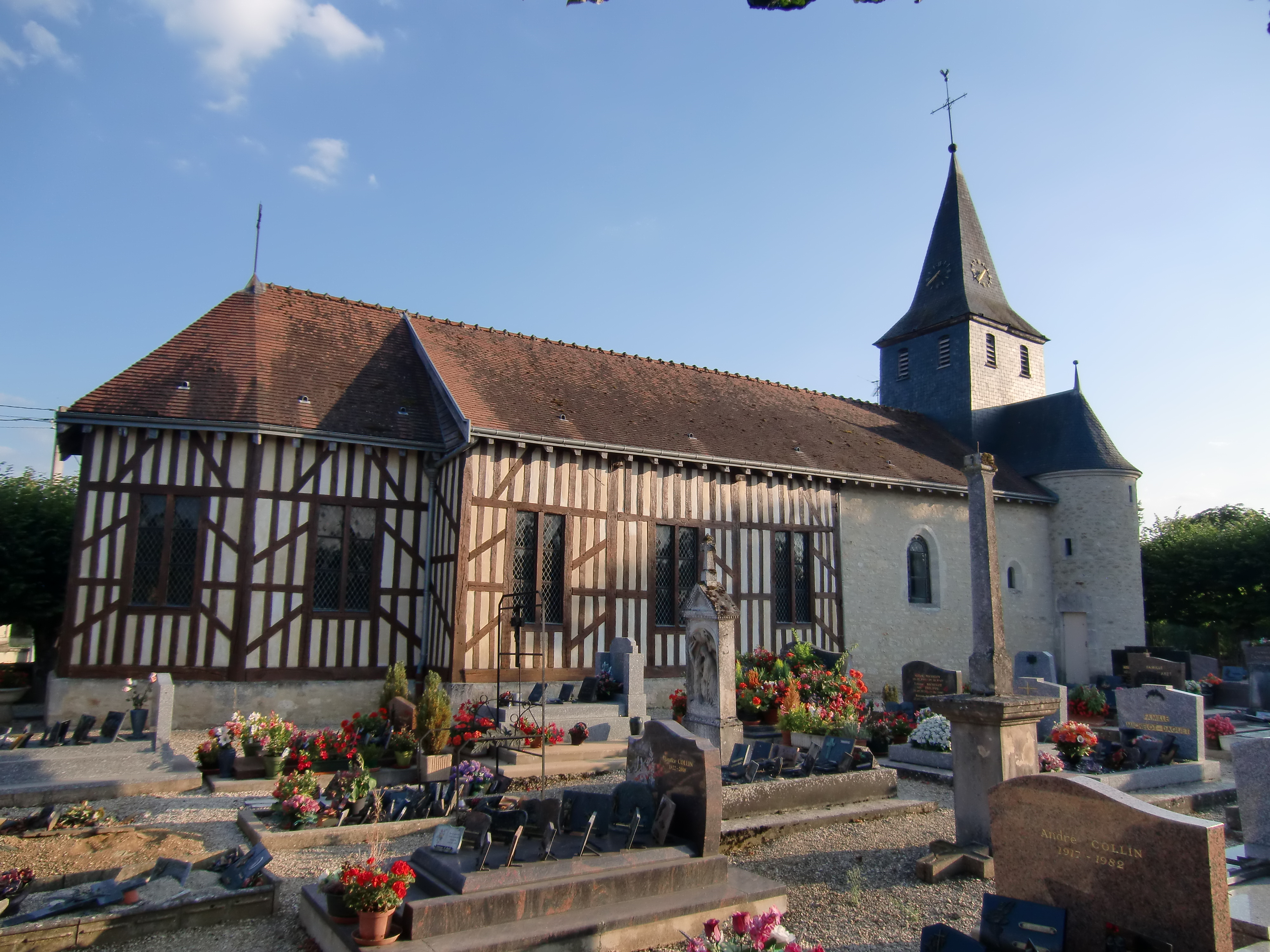
- The church in Juzanvigny
- Location of Juzanvigny
- Location within France Location within Grand Est
- Coordinates: 48°24′56″N 4°35′22″E
- Country: France
- Region: Grand Est
- Department: Aube
- Arrondissement: Bar-sur-Aube
- Canton: Bar-sur-Aube

Government
  - Mayor (2020–2026): Philippe Lièvre
- Area^{1}: 7.64 km^{2} (2.95 sq mi)
- Elevation: 125 m (410 ft)
- Population (2023): 120
  - Density: 16/km^{2} (41/sq mi)
- Time zone: UTC+01:00 (CET)
  - Summer (DST): UTC+02:00 (CEST)
- INSEE/Postal code: 10184 /10500
- ^{1} French Land Register data, which excludes lakes, ponds, glaciers > 1 km^{2} (0.386 sq mi or 247 acres) and river estuaries.

Juzanvigny (French pronunciation: [ʒyzɑ̃viɲi]) is a commune in the Aube department in north-central France.

== Population ==
Historical population
| Year | Pop. | ±% p.a. |
|---|---|---|
| 1968 | 198 | — |
| 1975 | 167 | −2.40% |
| 1982 | 151 | −1.43% |
| 1990 | 120 | −2.83% |
| 1999 | 134 | +1.23% |
| 2007 | 125 | −0.87% |
| 2012 | 128 | +0.48% |
| 2017 | 127 | −0.16% |
| 2023 | 120 | −0.94% |
Source: INSEE

== See also ==
- Communes of the Aube department
