= Colombé-le-Sec =

Commune in Grand Est, France

- Commune
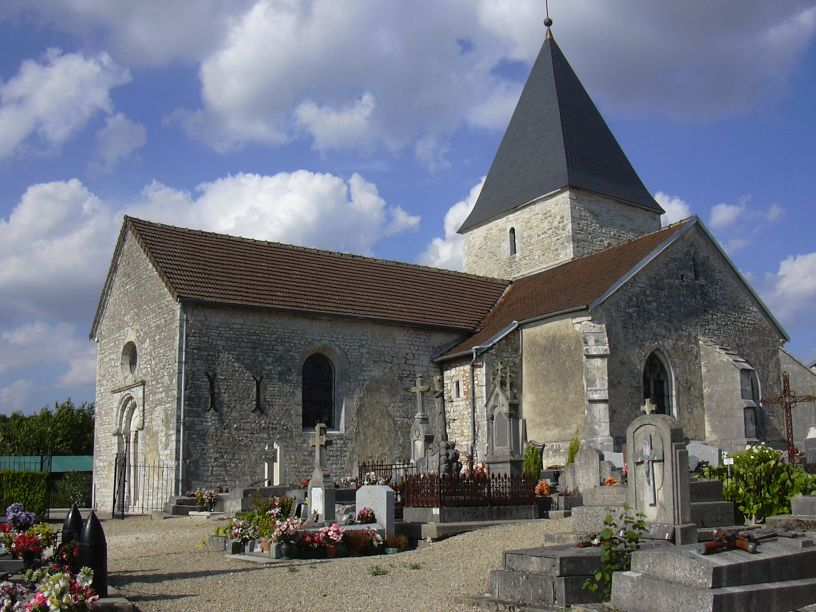
- The church in Colombé-le-Sec

- Coat of arms
- Location of Colombé-le-Sec
- Location within France Location within Grand Est
- Coordinates: 48°15′20″N 4°47′51″E
- Country: France
- Region: Grand Est
- Department: Aube
- Arrondissement: Bar-sur-Aube
- Canton: Bar-sur-Aube
- Intercommunality: Région de Bar-sur-Aube

Government
  - Mayor (2020–2026): Denis Nicolo
- Area^{1}: 8.78 km^{2} (3.39 sq mi)
- Elevation: 243 m (797 ft)
- Population (2023): 157
  - Density: 17.9/km^{2} (46.3/sq mi)
- Time zone: UTC+01:00 (CET)
  - Summer (DST): UTC+02:00 (CEST)
- INSEE/Postal code: 10103 /10200
- ^{1} French Land Register data, which excludes lakes, ponds, glaciers > 1 km^{2} (0.386 sq mi or 247 acres) and river estuaries.

Colombé-le-Sec (French pronunciation: [kɔlɔ̃be lə sɛk]) is a commune in the Aube department in north-central France.

== Population ==
Historical population
Year	Pop.	±% p.a.
1968	172	—
1975	149	−2.03%
1982	159	+0.93%
1990	161	+0.16%
1999	148	−0.93%
2007	140	−0.69%
2012	148	+1.12%
2017	149	+0.13%
2023	157	+0.88%
Source: INSEE

== See also ==
- Communes of the Aube department
