= Vernonvilliers =

Commune in Grand Est, France

- Commune
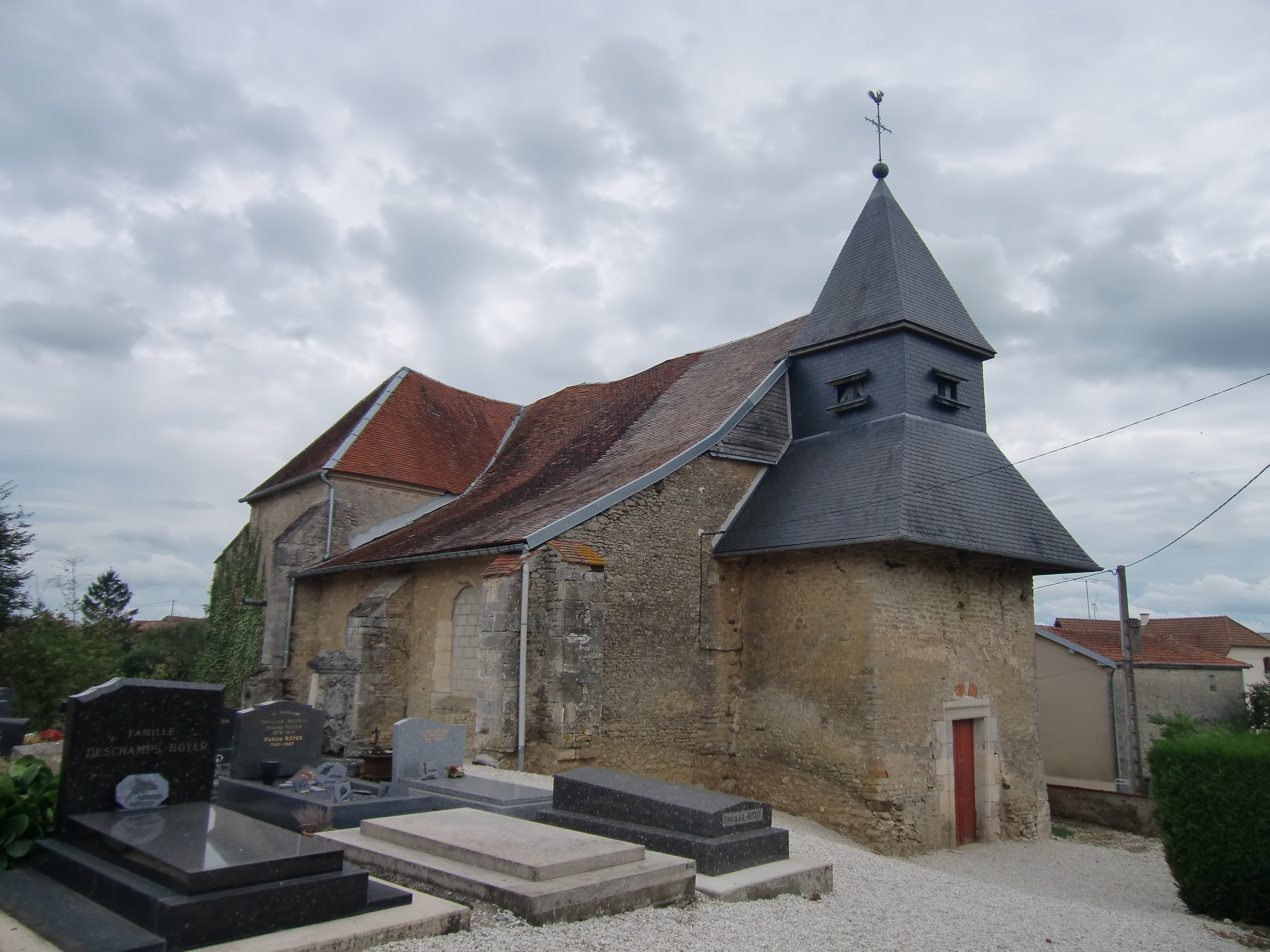
- The church in Vernonvilliers
- Location of Vernonvilliers
- Location within France Location within Grand Est
- Coordinates: 48°18′57″N 4°40′51″E
- Country: France
- Region: Grand Est
- Department: Aube
- Arrondissement: Bar-sur-Aube
- Canton: Bar-sur-Aube
- Intercommunality: Vendeuvre-Soulaines

Government
  - Mayor (2020–2026): Claude Drappier
- Area^{1}: 7.66 km^{2} (2.96 sq mi)
- Elevation: 186 m (610 ft)
- Population (2023): 59
  - Density: 7.7/km^{2} (20/sq mi)
- Time zone: UTC+01:00 (CET)
  - Summer (DST): UTC+02:00 (CEST)
- INSEE/Postal code: 10403 /10200
- ^{1} French Land Register data, which excludes lakes, ponds, glaciers > 1 km^{2} (0.386 sq mi or 247 acres) and river estuaries.

Vernonvilliers (French pronunciation: [vɛʁnɔ̃vilje]) is a commune in the Aube department in north-central France.

== Population ==
Historical population
Year	Pop.	±% p.a.
1968	93	—
1975	86	−1.11%
1982	77	−1.57%
1990	87	+1.54%
1999	86	−0.13%
2007	84	−0.29%
2012	73	−2.77%
2017	58	−4.50%
2023	59	+0.29%
Source: INSEE

== See also ==
- Communes of the Aube department
