= Lévigny =

Commune in Grand Est, France

- Commune
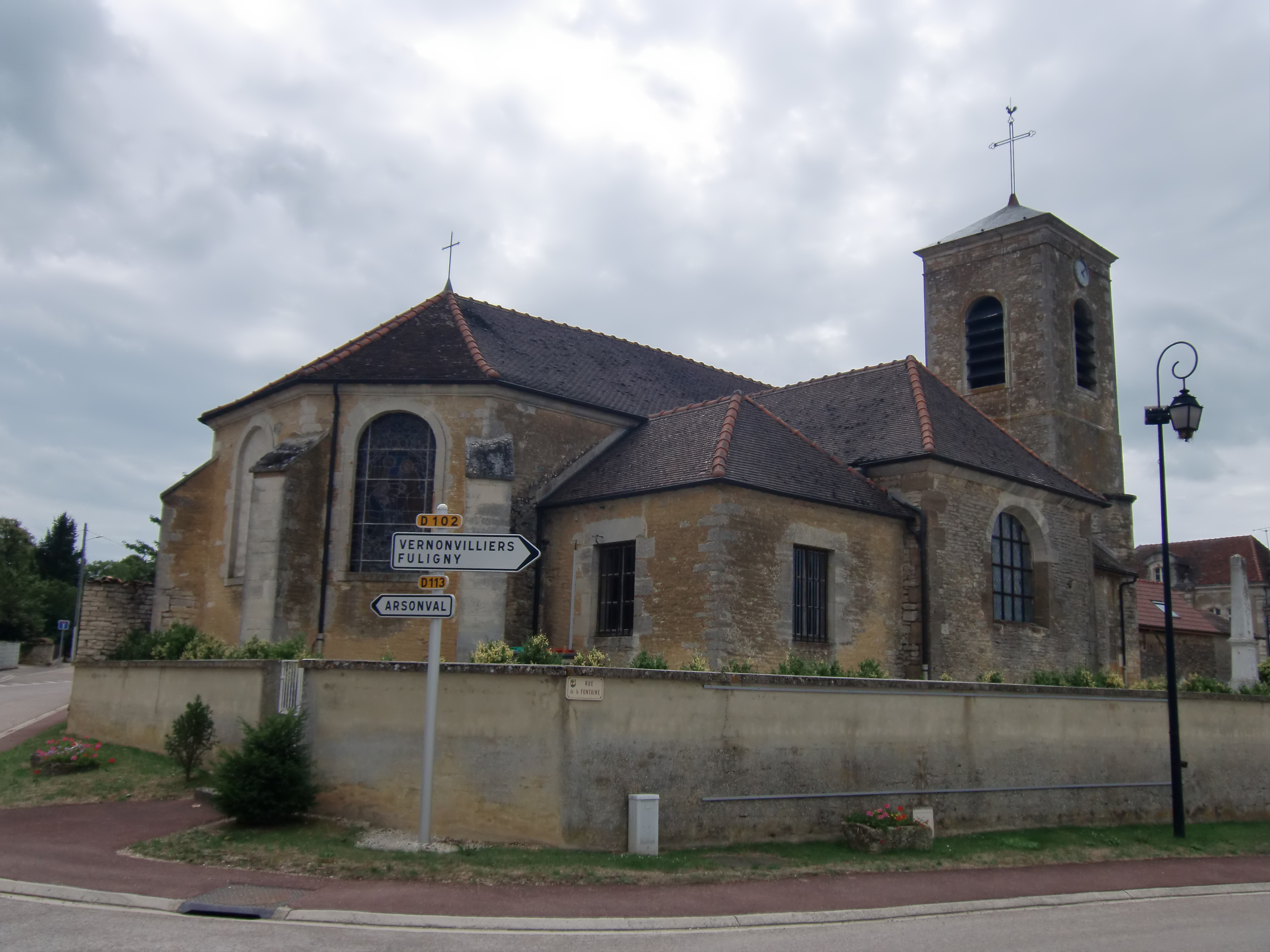
- The church in Lévigny
- Location of Lévigny
- Location within France Location within Grand Est
- Coordinates: 48°18′09″N 4°42′30″E
- Country: France
- Region: Grand Est
- Department: Aube
- Arrondissement: Bar-sur-Aube
- Canton: Bar-sur-Aube

Government
  - Mayor (2020–2026): Pierre Frison
- Area^{1}: 13.75 km^{2} (5.31 sq mi)
- Elevation: 292 m (958 ft)
- Population (2023): 93
  - Density: 6.8/km^{2} (18/sq mi)
- Time zone: UTC+01:00 (CET)
  - Summer (DST): UTC+02:00 (CEST)
- INSEE/Postal code: 10194 /10200
- ^{1} French Land Register data, which excludes lakes, ponds, glaciers > 1 km^{2} (0.386 sq mi or 247 acres) and river estuaries.

Lévigny (French pronunciation: [leviɲi]) is a commune in the Aube department in north-central France.

== Population ==
Historical population
Year	Pop.	±% p.a.
1968	132	—
1975	108	−2.83%
1982	107	−0.13%
1990	101	−0.72%
1999	109	+0.85%
2007	111	+0.23%
2012	101	−1.87%
2017	96	−1.01%
2023	93	−0.53%
Source: INSEE

== See also ==
- Communes of the Aube department
