= Maisons-lès-Soulaines =

Commune in Grand Est, France

- Commune
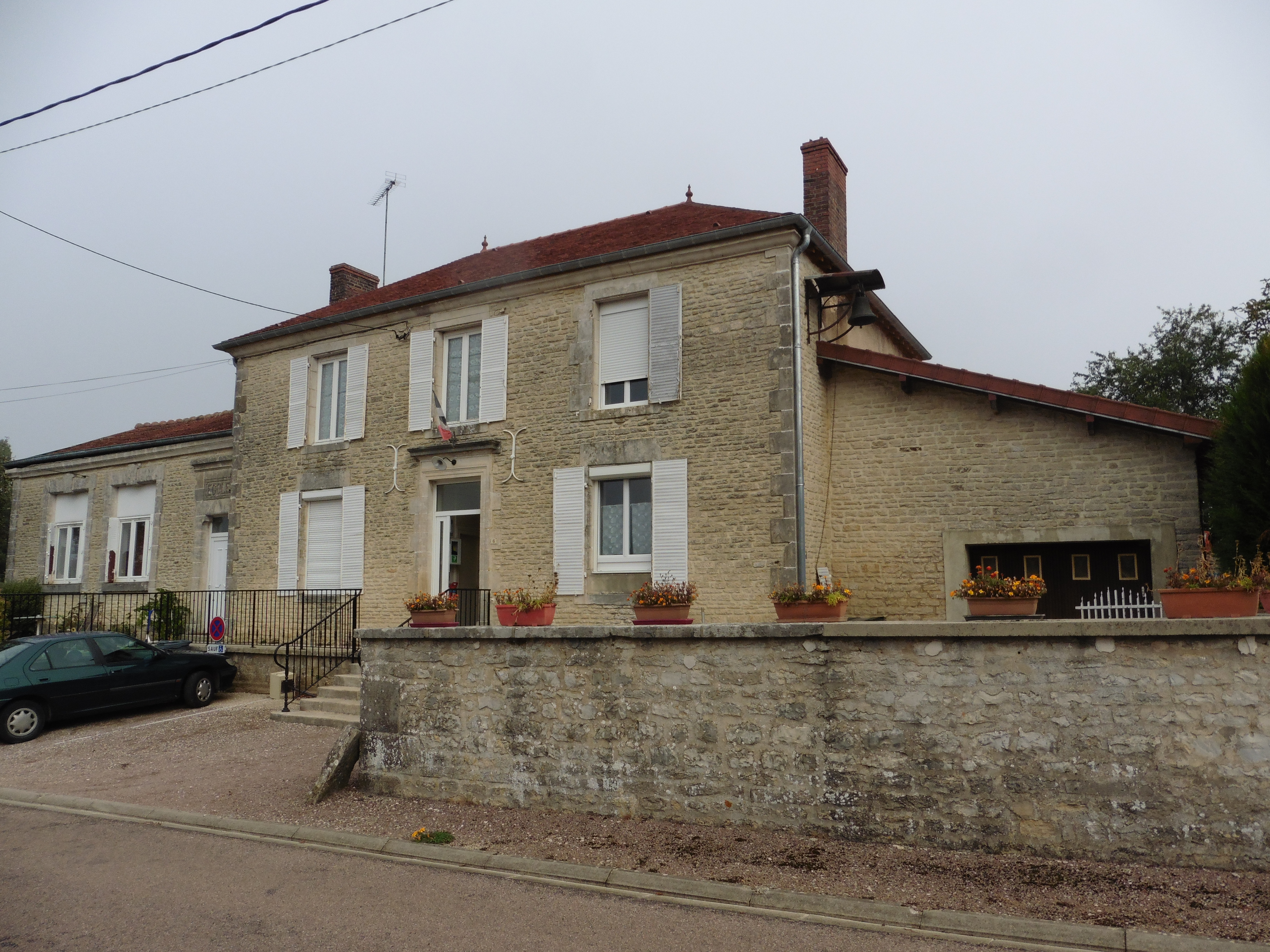
- Town hall
- Location of Maisons-lès-Soulaines
- Location within France Location within Grand Est
- Coordinates: 48°17′24″N 4°47′19″E
- Country: France
- Region: Grand Est
- Department: Aube
- Arrondissement: Bar-sur-Aube
- Canton: Bar-sur-Aube

Government
  - Mayor (2020–2026): Thierry Vincent
- Area^{1}: 6.16 km^{2} (2.38 sq mi)
- Elevation: 273 m (896 ft)
- Population (2023): 57
  - Density: 9.3/km^{2} (24/sq mi)
- Time zone: UTC+01:00 (CET)
  - Summer (DST): UTC+02:00 (CEST)
- INSEE/Postal code: 10219 /10200
- ^{1} French Land Register data, which excludes lakes, ponds, glaciers > 1 km^{2} (0.386 sq mi or 247 acres) and river estuaries.

Maisons-lès-Soulaines (French pronunciation: [mɛzɔ̃ lɛ sulɛn]) is a commune in the Aube department in north-central France.

== Population ==
Historical population
Year	Pop.	±% p.a.
1968	61	—
1975	50	−2.80%
1982	43	−2.13%
1990	54	+2.89%
1999	55	+0.20%
2007	76	+4.13%
2012	68	−2.20%
2017	63	−1.52%
2023	57	−1.65%
Source: INSEE

== See also ==
- Communes of the Aube department
