= Engente =

Commune in Grand Est, France

- Commune
- Location of Engente
- Location within France Location within Grand Est
- Coordinates: 48°16′14″N 4°45′24″E
- Country: France
- Region: Grand Est
- Department: Aube
- Arrondissement: Bar-sur-Aube
- Canton: Bar-sur-Aube
- Intercommunality: Région de Bar-sur-Aube

Government
  - Mayor (2020–2026): Olivier Yot
- Area^{1}: 5.12 km^{2} (1.98 sq mi)
- Elevation: 223 m (732 ft)
- Population (2023): 26
  - Density: 5.1/km^{2} (13/sq mi)
- Time zone: UTC+01:00 (CET)
  - Summer (DST): UTC+02:00 (CEST)
- INSEE/Postal code: 10137 /10200
- ^{1} French Land Register data, which excludes lakes, ponds, glaciers > 1 km^{2} (0.386 sq mi or 247 acres) and river estuaries.

Engente (French pronunciation: [ɑ̃ʒɑ̃t]) is a commune in the Aube department in north-central France.

== Population ==
Historical population
Year	Pop.	±% p.a.
1968	51	—
1975	51	+0.00%
1982	59	+2.10%
1990	61	+0.42%
1999	46	−3.09%
2007	45	−0.27%
2012	42	−1.37%
2017	36	−3.04%
2023	26	−5.28%
Source: INSEE

== See also ==
- Communes of the Aube department
