= Fresnay =

Commune in Grand Est, France

- Commune
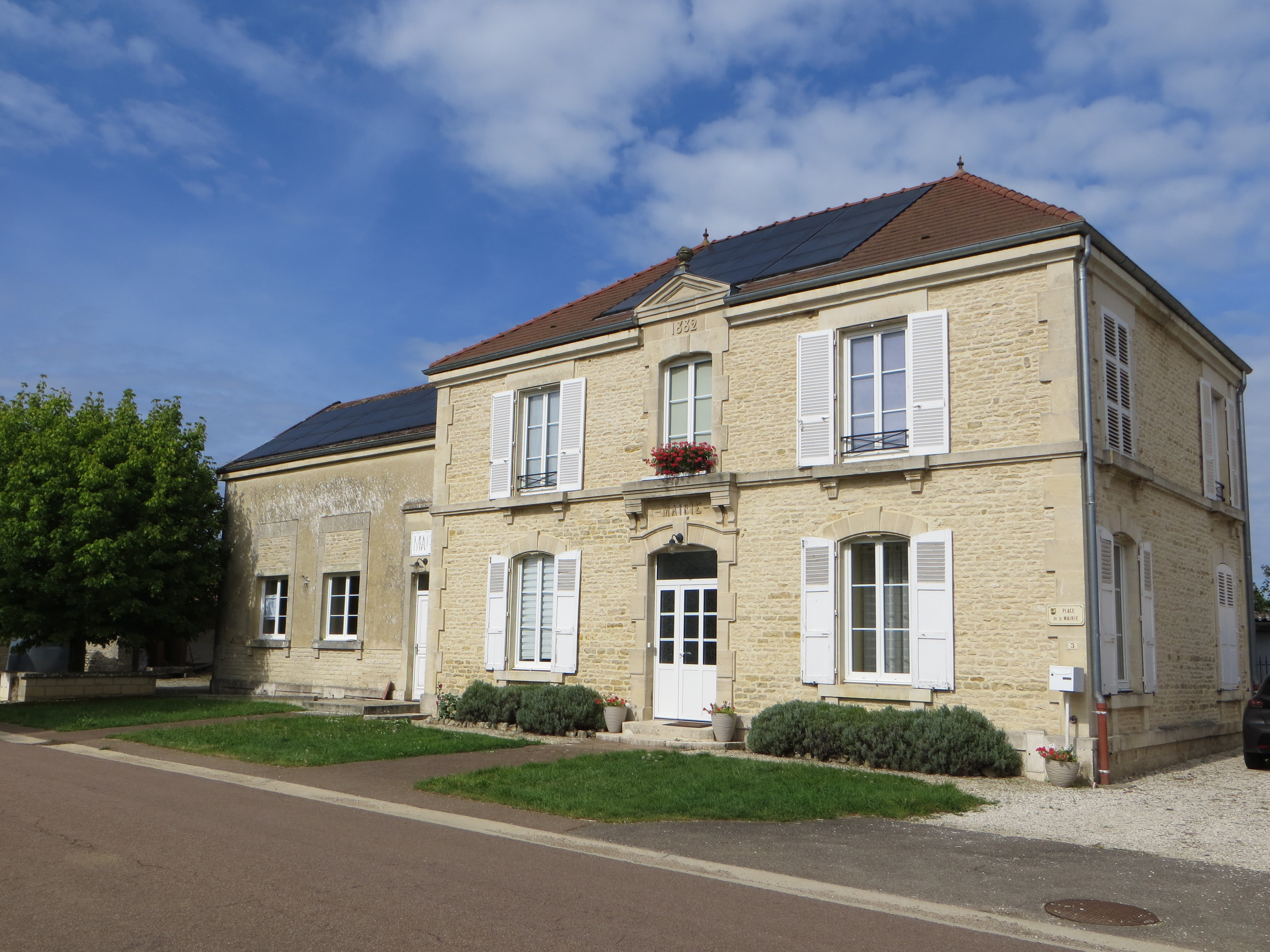
- Fresnay Town hall
- Location of Fresnay
- Location within France Location within Grand Est
- Coordinates: 48°18′55″N 4°45′07″E
- Country: France
- Region: Grand Est
- Department: Aube
- Arrondissement: Bar-sur-Aube
- Canton: Bar-sur-Aube

Government
  - Mayor (2020–2026): Pierre Jobard
- Area^{1}: 7.54 km^{2} (2.91 sq mi)
- Elevation: 130 m (430 ft)
- Population (2023): 49
  - Density: 6.5/km^{2} (17/sq mi)
- Time zone: UTC+01:00 (CET)
  - Summer (DST): UTC+02:00 (CEST)
- INSEE/Postal code: 10161 /10200
- ^{1} French Land Register data, which excludes lakes, ponds, glaciers > 1 km^{2} (0.386 sq mi or 247 acres) and river estuaries.

Fresnay (French pronunciation: [fʁɛnɛ]) is a commune in the Aube department in north-central France.

== Population ==
Historical population
Year	Pop.	±% p.a.
1968	71	—
1975	57	−3.09%
1982	59	+0.49%
1990	52	−1.57%
1999	43	−2.09%
2007	47	+1.12%
2012	42	−2.22%
2017	47	+2.28%
2023	49	+0.70%
Source: INSEE

== See also ==
- Communes of the Aube department
