= Épothémont =

Commune in Grand Est, France

- Commune
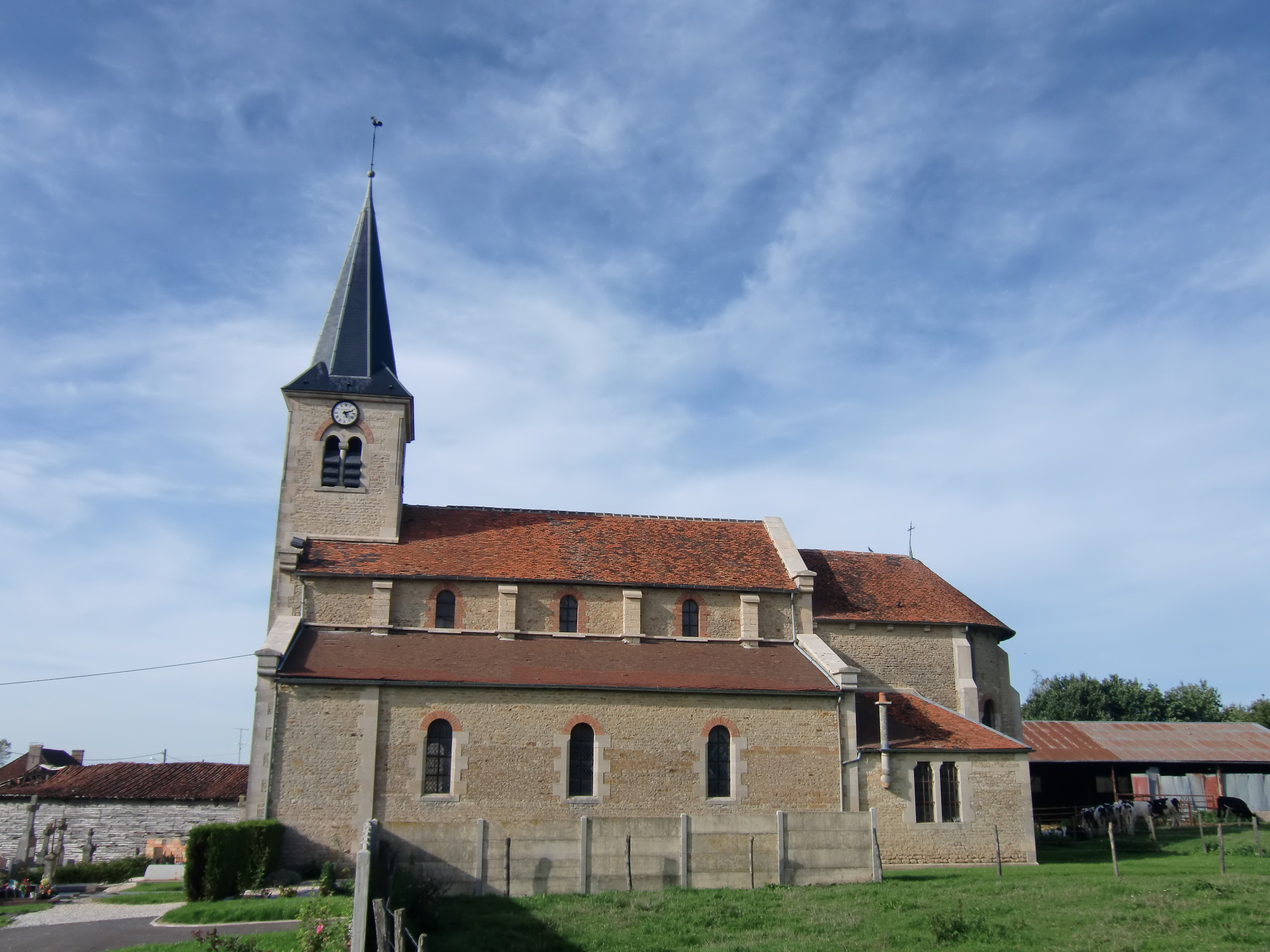
- The church in Épothémont

- Coat of arms
- Location of Épothémont
- Location within France Location within Grand Est
- Coordinates: 48°25′07″N 4°39′30″E
- Country: France
- Region: Grand Est
- Department: Aube
- Arrondissement: Bar-sur-Aube
- Canton: Bar-sur-Aube

Government
  - Mayor (2020–2026): François Matrion
- Area^{1}: 10.43 km^{2} (4.03 sq mi)
- Elevation: 145 m (476 ft)
- Population (2023): 153
  - Density: 14.7/km^{2} (38.0/sq mi)
- Time zone: UTC+01:00 (CET)
  - Summer (DST): UTC+02:00 (CEST)
- INSEE/Postal code: 10139 /10500
- ^{1} French Land Register data, which excludes lakes, ponds, glaciers > 1 km^{2} (0.386 sq mi or 247 acres) and river estuaries.

Épothémont (French pronunciation: [epɔtemɔ̃]) is a commune in the Aube department in north-central France.

== Population ==
Historical population
Year	Pop.	±% p.a.
1968	181	—
1975	152	−2.46%
1982	142	−0.97%
1990	163	+1.74%
1999	175	+0.79%
2007	163	−0.88%
2012	181	+2.12%
2017	179	−0.22%
2023	153	−2.58%
Source: INSEE

== See also ==
- Communes of the Aube department
