= Couvignon =

Commune in Grand Est, France

- Commune
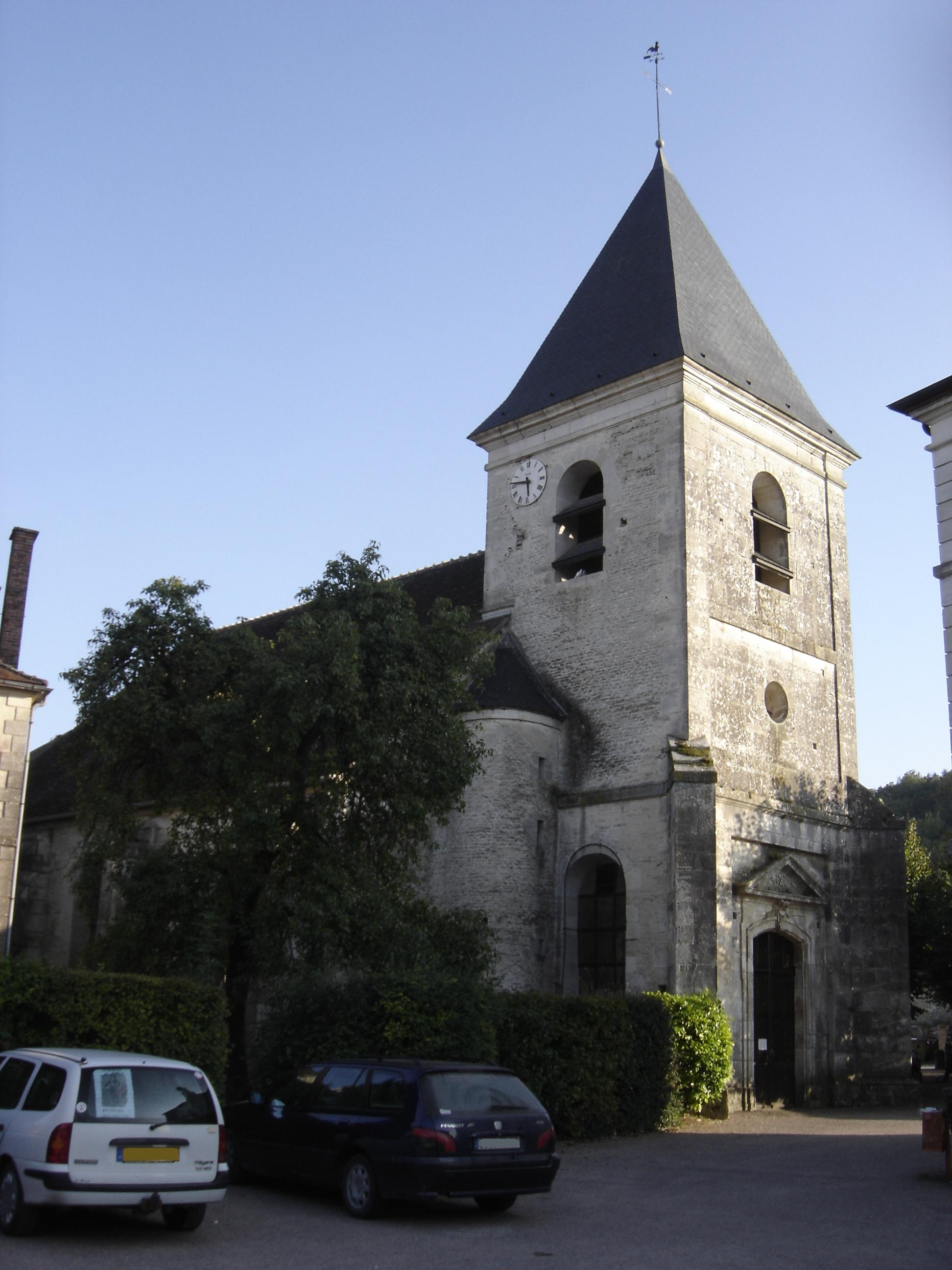
- The church in Couvignon
- Location of Couvignon
- Location within France Location within Grand Est
- Coordinates: 48°12′31″N 4°39′06″E
- Country: France
- Region: Grand Est
- Department: Aube
- Arrondissement: Bar-sur-Aube
- Canton: Bar-sur-Aube
- Intercommunality: Région de Bar-sur-Aube

Government
  - Mayor (2020–2026): Walter Léger
- Area^{1}: 13.43 km^{2} (5.19 sq mi)
- Elevation: 212 m (696 ft)
- Population (2023): 199
  - Density: 14.8/km^{2} (38.4/sq mi)
- Time zone: UTC+01:00 (CET)
  - Summer (DST): UTC+02:00 (CEST)
- INSEE/Postal code: 10113 /10200
- ^{1} French Land Register data, which excludes lakes, ponds, glaciers > 1 km^{2} (0.386 sq mi or 247 acres) and river estuaries.

Couvignon (French pronunciation: [kuviɲɔ̃]) is a commune in the Aube department in north-central France.

== Population ==
Historical population
Year	Pop.	±% p.a.
1968	228	—
1975	222	−0.38%
1982	248	+1.59%
1990	232	−0.83%
1999	237	+0.24%
2007	247	+0.52%
2012	209	−3.29%
2017	202	−0.68%
2023	199	−0.25%
Source: INSEE

== See also ==
- Communes of the Aube department
