= Thors, Aube =

Commune in Grand Est, France

Thors
- Commune
- Location of Thors
- Location within France Location within Grand Est
- Coordinates: 48°18′18″N 4°48′43″E
- Country: France
- Region: Grand Est
- Department: Aube
- Arrondissement: Bar-sur-Aube
- Canton: Bar-sur-Aube

Government
  - Mayor (2020–2026): Jean-Claude Gouvernet
- Area^{1}: 8.33 km^{2} (3.22 sq mi)
- Elevation: 155 m (509 ft)
- Population (2023): 64
  - Density: 7.7/km^{2} (20/sq mi)
- Time zone: UTC+01:00 (CET)
  - Summer (DST): UTC+02:00 (CEST)
- INSEE/Postal code: 10378 /10200
- ^{1} French Land Register data, which excludes lakes, ponds, glaciers > 1 km^{2} (0.386 sq mi or 247 acres) and river estuaries.

Thors is a commune in the Aube department in north-central France.

== Population ==
Historical population
Year	Pop.	±% p.a.
1968	103	—
1975	81	−3.37%
1982	64	−3.31%
1990	78	+2.50%
1999	98	+2.57%
2007	79	−2.66%
2012	74	−1.30%
2017	71	−0.82%
2023	64	−1.72%
Source: INSEE

== See also ==
- Communes of the Aube department
