= La Chaise =

Commune in Grand Est, France

- Commune
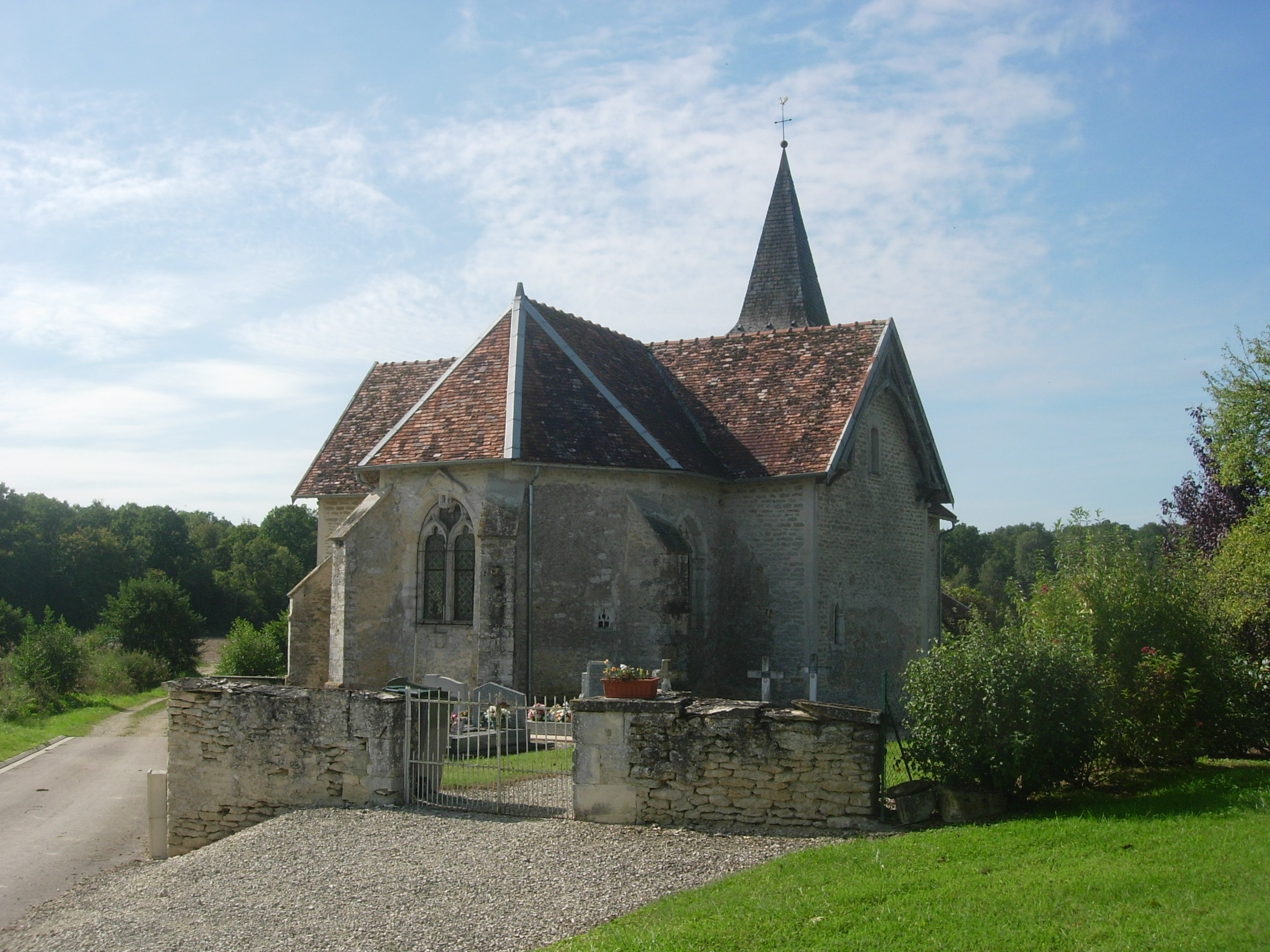
- The church in La Chaise
- Location of La Chaise
- Location within France Location within Grand Est
- Coordinates: 48°21′47″N 4°39′38″E
- Country: France
- Region: Grand Est
- Department: Aube
- Arrondissement: Bar-sur-Aube
- Canton: Bar-sur-Aube

Government
  - Mayor (2020–2026): Christophe Tournemeulle
- Area^{1}: 8.81 km^{2} (3.40 sq mi)
- Elevation: 165 m (541 ft)
- Highest elevation: 182 m (597 ft)
- Lowest elevation: 132 m (433 ft)
- Population (2023): 32
  - Density: 3.6/km^{2} (9.4/sq mi)
- Time zone: UTC+01:00 (CET)
  - Summer (DST): UTC+02:00 (CEST)
- INSEE/Postal code: 10072 /10500
- ^{1} French Land Register data, which excludes lakes, ponds, glaciers > 1 km^{2} (0.386 sq mi or 247 acres) and river estuaries.

La Chaise (French pronunciation: [la ʃɛz]) is a commune in the Aube department in north-central France.

== Population ==
Historical population
Year	Pop.	±% p.a.
1968	43	—
1975	35	−2.90%
1982	32	−1.27%
1990	27	−2.10%
1999	29	+0.80%
2007	35	+2.38%
2012	39	+2.19%
2017	37	−1.05%
2023	32	−2.39%
Source: INSEE

== See also ==
- Communes of the Aube department
