= Bergères =

Commune in Grand Est, France

- Commune
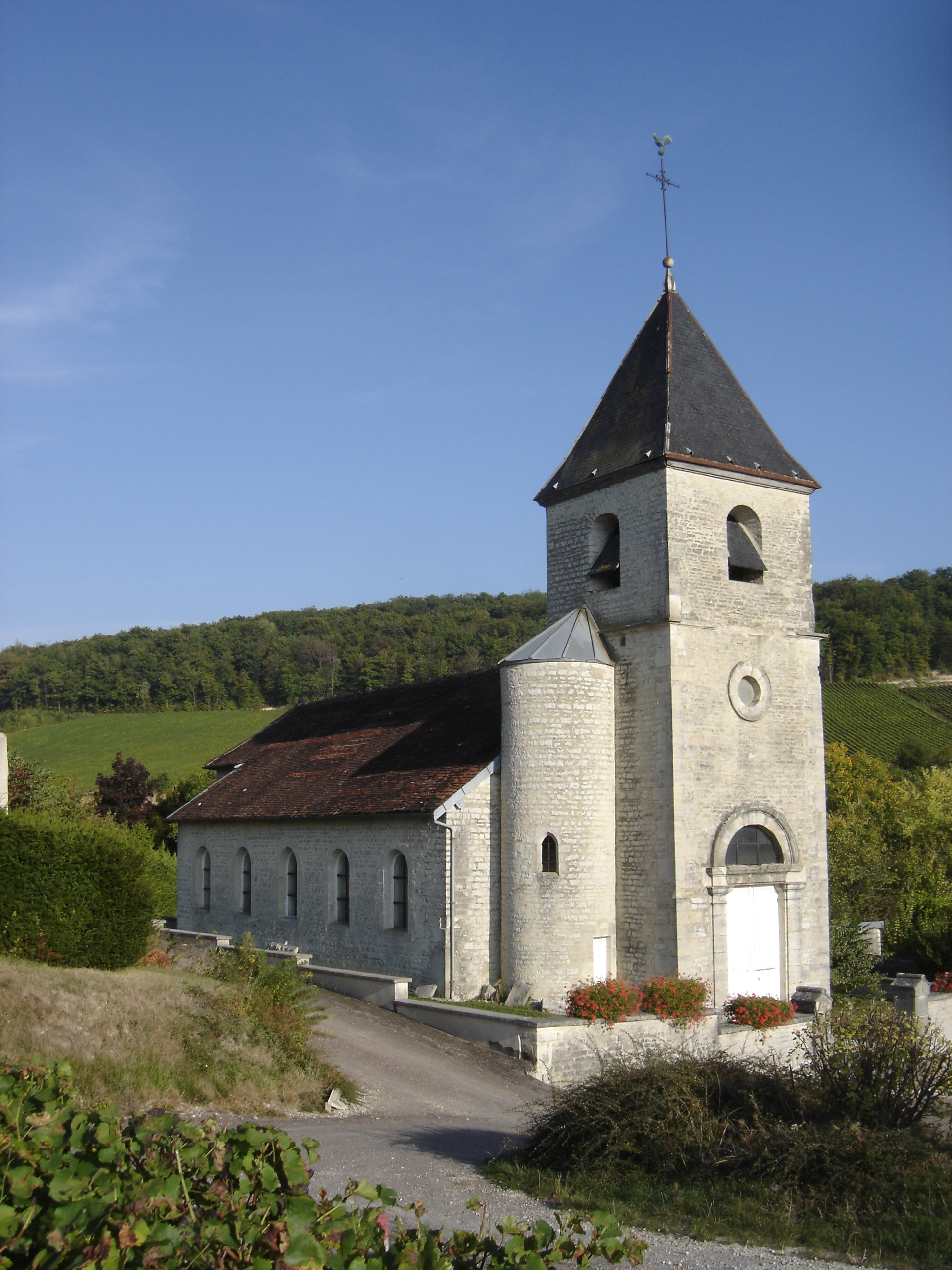
- Saint Martin's
- Location of Bergères
- Location within France Location within Grand Est
- Coordinates: 48°11′11″N 4°40′03″E
- Country: France
- Region: Grand Est
- Department: Aube
- Arrondissement: Bar-sur-Aube
- Canton: Bar-sur-Aube

Government
  - Mayor (2020–2026): Florence Petit
- Area^{1}: 5.81 km^{2} (2.24 sq mi)
- Elevation: 246 m (807 ft)
- Population (2023): 111
  - Density: 19.1/km^{2} (49.5/sq mi)
- Time zone: UTC+01:00 (CET)
  - Summer (DST): UTC+02:00 (CEST)
- INSEE/Postal code: 10039 /10200
- ^{1} French Land Register data, which excludes lakes, ponds, glaciers > 1 km^{2} (0.386 sq mi or 247 acres) and river estuaries.

Bergères (French pronunciation: [bɛʁʒɛʁ]) is a commune in the Aube department in north-central France.

== Population ==
Historical population
Year	Pop.	±% p.a.
1968	123	—
1975	112	−1.33%
1982	140	+3.24%
1990	121	−1.81%
1999	114	−0.66%
2007	119	+0.54%
2012	123	+0.66%
2017	123	+0.00%
2023	111	−1.70%
Source: INSEE

== See also ==
- Communes of the Aube department
