= Chaumesnil =

Commune in Grand Est, France

- Commune
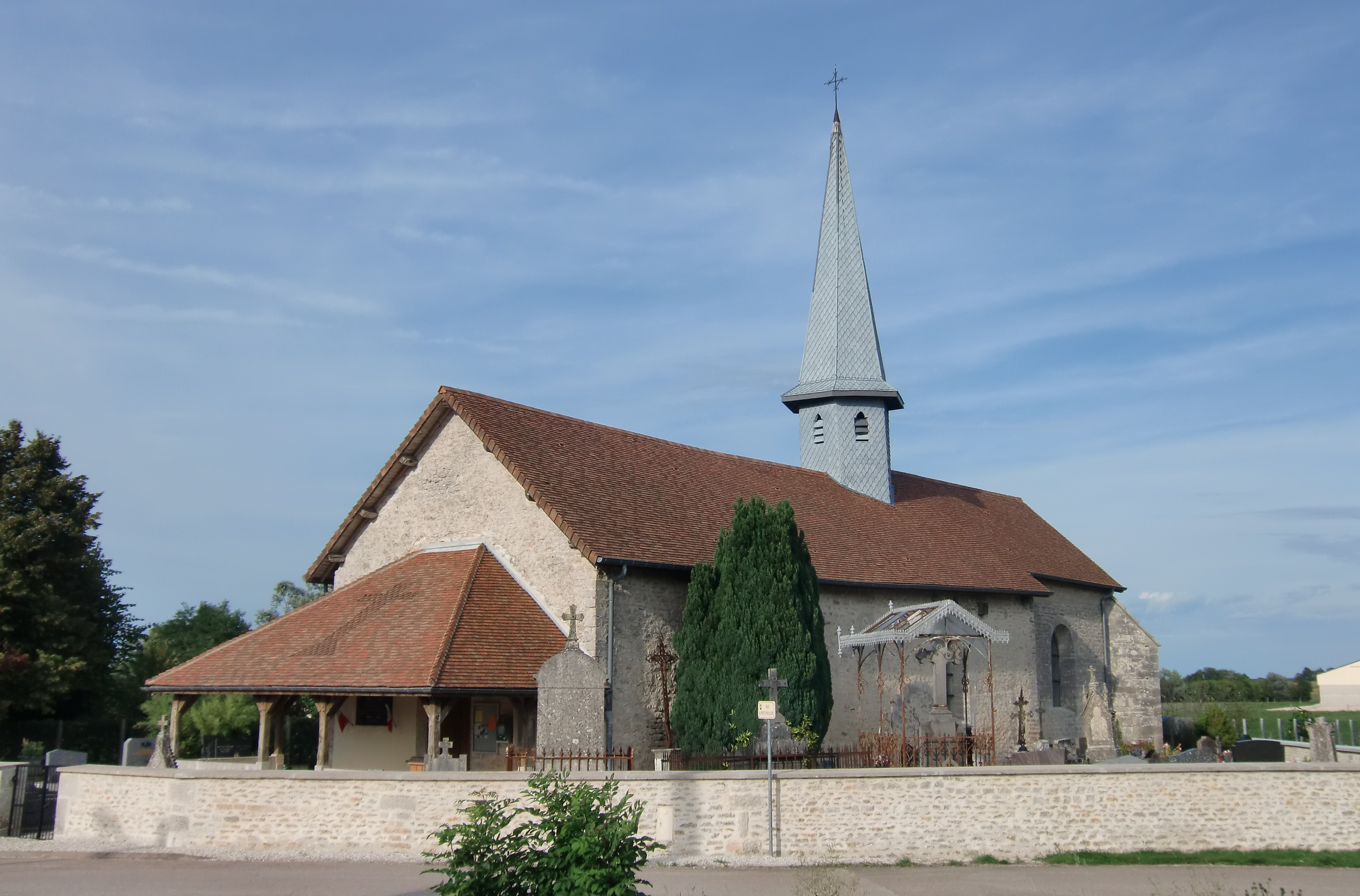
- The church in Chaumesnil
- Location of Chaumesnil
- Location within France Location within Grand Est
- Coordinates: 48°21′40″N 4°35′45″E
- Country: France
- Region: Grand Est
- Department: Aube
- Arrondissement: Bar-sur-Aube
- Canton: Bar-sur-Aube

Government
  - Mayor (2020–2026): Dany Cordier
- Area^{1}: 11.07 km^{2} (4.27 sq mi)
- Elevation: 139 m (456 ft)
- Population (2023): 112
  - Density: 10.1/km^{2} (26.2/sq mi)
- Time zone: UTC+01:00 (CET)
  - Summer (DST): UTC+02:00 (CEST)
- INSEE/Postal code: 10093 /10500
- ^{1} French Land Register data, which excludes lakes, ponds, glaciers > 1 km^{2} (0.386 sq mi or 247 acres) and river estuaries.

Chaumesnil (French pronunciation: [ʃomɛnil]) is a commune in the Aube department in north-central France.

== Population ==
Historical population
Year	Pop.	±% p.a.
1968	91	—
1975	82	−1.48%
1982	63	−3.70%
1990	72	+1.68%
1999	82	+1.46%
2007	82	+0.00%
2012	91	+2.10%
2017	103	+2.51%
2023	112	+1.41%
Source: INSEE

== See also ==
- Communes of the Aube department
