= Éclance =

Commune in Grand Est, France

- Commune
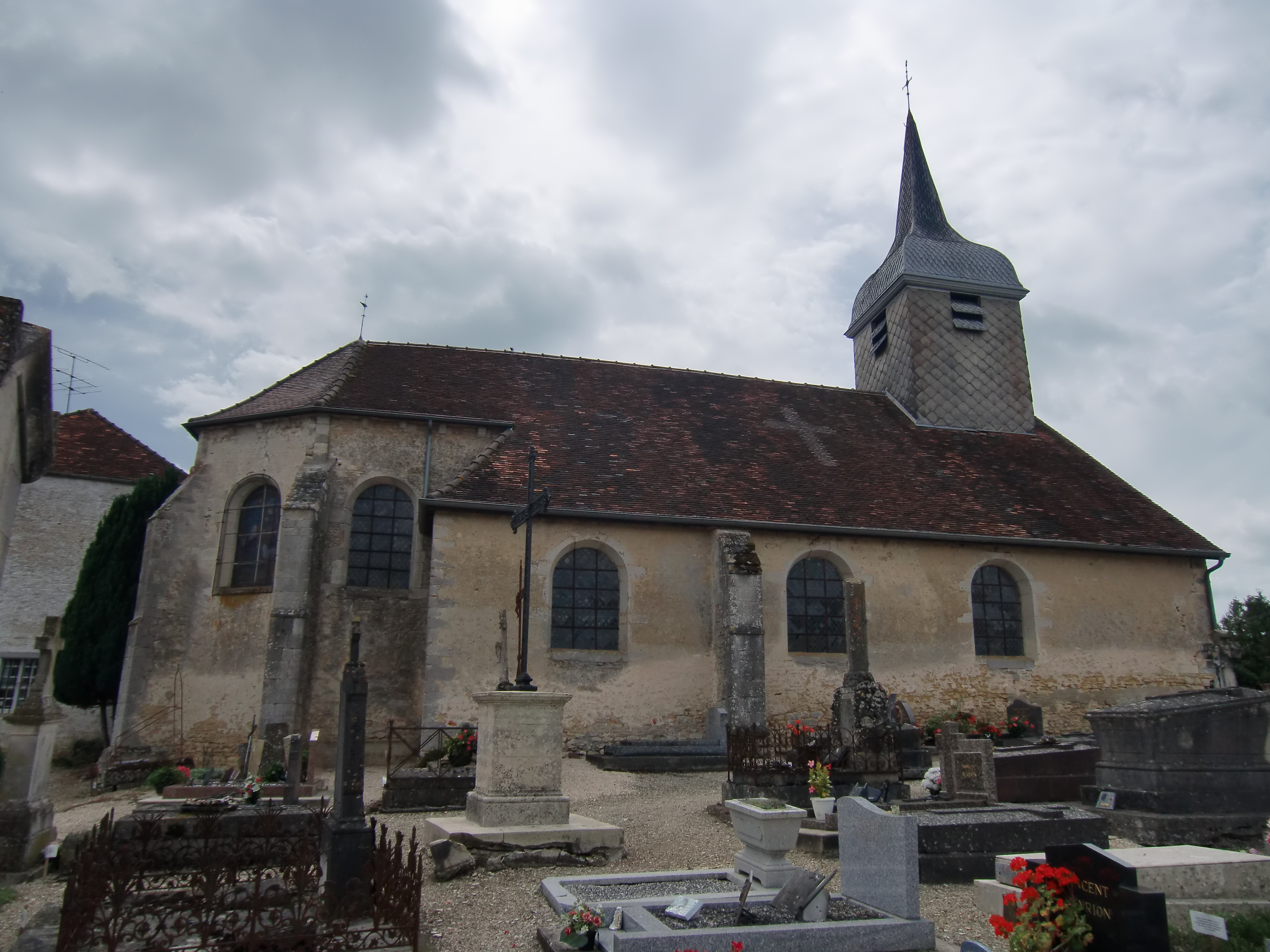
- The church in Éclance

- Coat of arms
- Location of Éclance
- Location within France Location within Grand Est
- Coordinates: 48°18′25″N 4°38′06″E
- Country: France
- Region: Grand Est
- Department: Aube
- Arrondissement: Bar-sur-Aube
- Canton: Bar-sur-Aube

Government
  - Mayor (2023–2026): Aurore Pascaud
- Area^{1}: 11.48 km^{2} (4.43 sq mi)
- Elevation: 190 m (620 ft)
- Population (2023): 86
  - Density: 7.5/km^{2} (19/sq mi)
- Time zone: UTC+01:00 (CET)
  - Summer (DST): UTC+02:00 (CEST)
- INSEE/Postal code: 10135 /10200
- ^{1} French Land Register data, which excludes lakes, ponds, glaciers > 1 km^{2} (0.386 sq mi or 247 acres) and river estuaries.

Éclance (French pronunciation: [eklɑ̃s]) is a commune in the Aube department in north-central France.

== Population ==
Historical population
Year	Pop.	±% p.a.
1968	145	—
1975	133	−1.23%
1982	125	−0.88%
1990	114	−1.14%
1999	120	+0.57%
2007	123	+0.31%
2012	102	−3.68%
2017	101	−0.20%
2023	86	−2.64%
Source: INSEE

== See also ==
- Communes of the Aube department
