= Saulcy, Aube =

Commune in Grand Est, France

Saulcy
- Commune
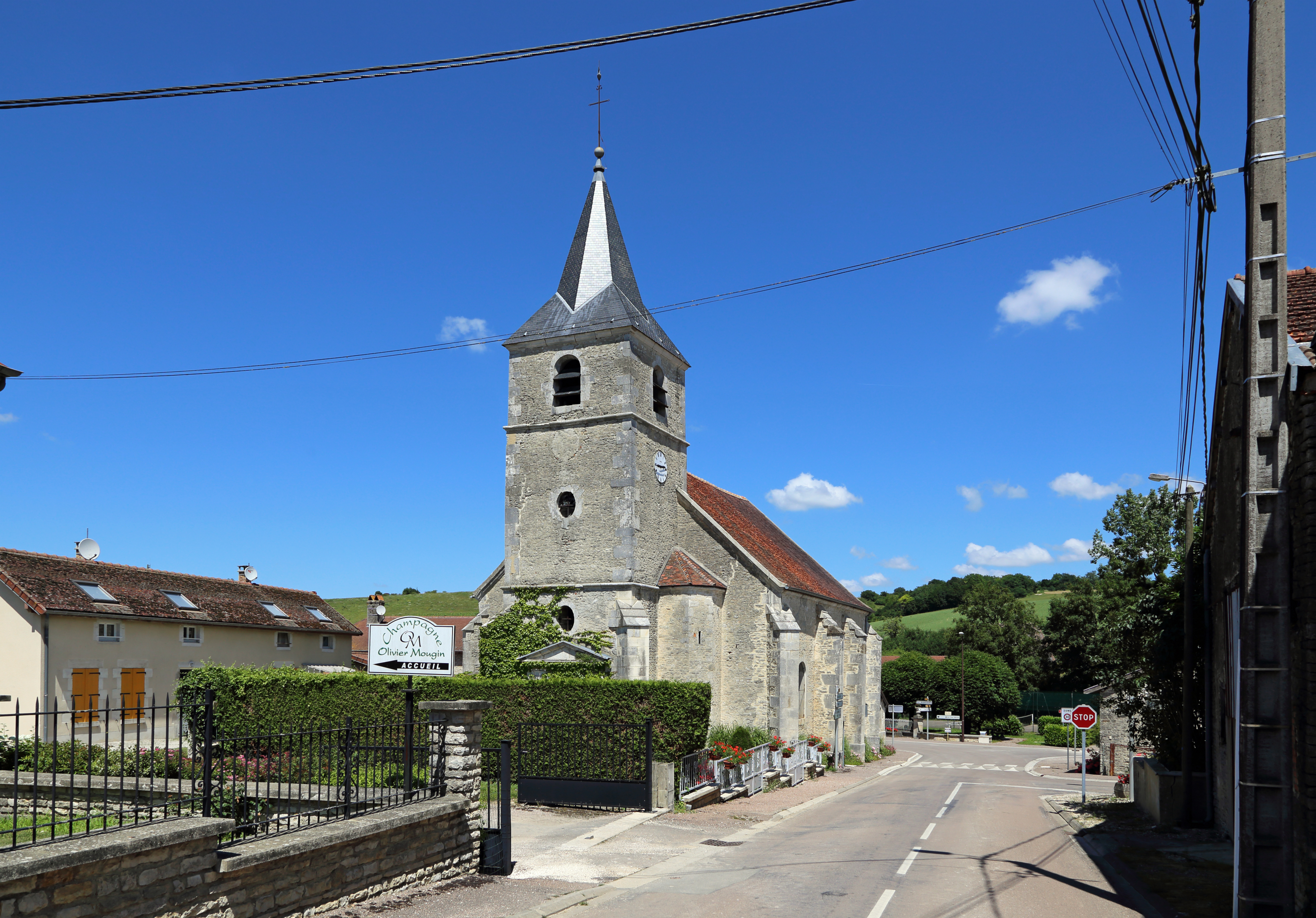
- The church in Saulcy

- Coat of arms
- Location of Saulcy
- Location within France Location within Grand Est
- Coordinates: 48°16′44″N 4°50′04″E
- Country: France
- Region: Grand Est
- Department: Aube
- Arrondissement: Bar-sur-Aube
- Canton: Bar-sur-Aube

Government
  - Mayor (2020–2026): Pierre Hugot
- Area^{1}: 11.39 km^{2} (4.40 sq mi)
- Elevation: 258 m (846 ft)
- Population (2023): 62
  - Density: 5.4/km^{2} (14/sq mi)
- Time zone: UTC+01:00 (CET)
  - Summer (DST): UTC+02:00 (CEST)
- INSEE/Postal code: 10366 /10200
- ^{1} French Land Register data, which excludes lakes, ponds, glaciers > 1 km^{2} (0.386 sq mi or 247 acres) and river estuaries.

Saulcy (French pronunciation: [so(l)si]) is a commune in the Aube department in north-central France.

== Population ==
Historical population
Year	Pop.	±% p.a.
1968	76	—
1975	80	+0.74%
1982	76	−0.73%
1990	82	+0.95%
1999	74	−1.13%
2007	87	+2.04%
2012	79	−1.91%
2017	68	−2.95%
2023	62	−1.53%
Source: INSEE

== See also ==
- Communes of the Aube department
