= Spoy, Aube =

Commune in Grand Est, France

Spoy
- Commune
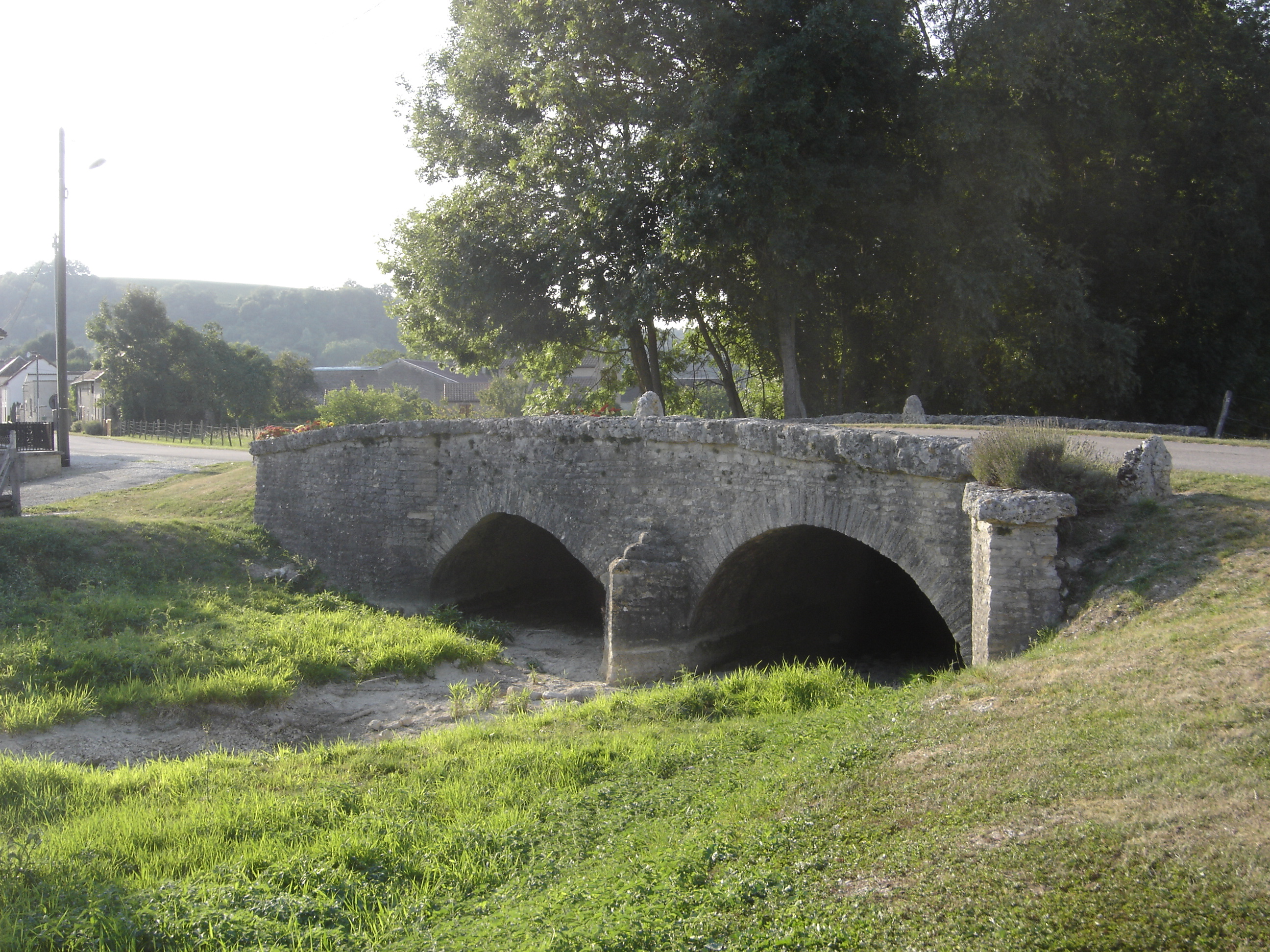
- Roman bridge
- Location of Spoy
- Location within France Location within Grand Est
- Coordinates: 48°13′44″N 4°37′16″E
- Country: France
- Region: Grand Est
- Department: Aube
- Arrondissement: Bar-sur-Aube
- Canton: Bar-sur-Aube
- Intercommunality: Région de Bar-sur-Aube

Government
  - Mayor (2020–2026): Thomas Gagnant
- Area^{1}: 10.36 km^{2} (4.00 sq mi)
- Elevation: 188 m (617 ft)
- Population (2023): 143
  - Density: 13.8/km^{2} (35.7/sq mi)
- Time zone: UTC+01:00 (CET)
  - Summer (DST): UTC+02:00 (CEST)
- INSEE/Postal code: 10374 /10200
- ^{1} French Land Register data, which excludes lakes, ponds, glaciers > 1 km^{2} (0.386 sq mi or 247 acres) and river estuaries.

Spoy (French pronunciation: [spwa]) is a commune in the Aube department in north-central France.

== Demography ==
Historical population
Year	Pop.	±% p.a.
1968	162	—
1975	125	−3.64%
1982	136	+1.21%
1990	157	+1.81%
1999	154	−0.21%
2007	156	+0.16%
2012	131	−3.43%
2017	177	+6.20%
2023	143	−3.49%
Source: INSEE

== See also ==
- Communes of the Aube department
