= La Rothière =

Commune in Grand Est, France

- Commune
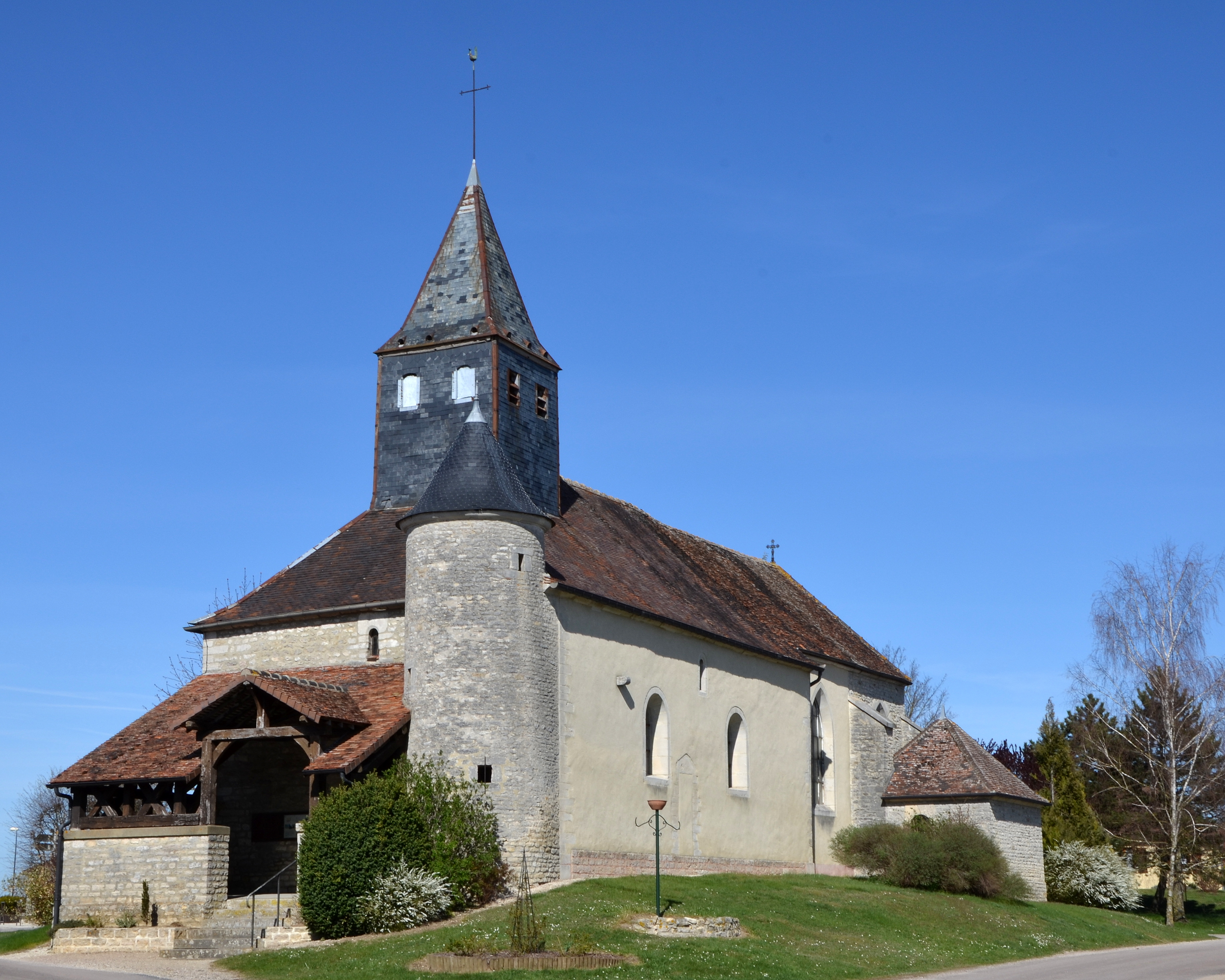
- The church in La Rothière

- Coat of arms
- Location of La Rothière
- Location within France Location within Grand Est
- Coordinates: 48°20′45″N 4°33′30″E
- Country: France
- Region: Grand Est
- Department: Aube
- Arrondissement: Bar-sur-Aube
- Canton: Bar-sur-Aube
- Intercommunality: Vendeuvre-Soulaines

Government
  - Mayor (2020–2026): Bruno Beltramelli
- Area^{1}: 7.13 km^{2} (2.75 sq mi)
- Elevation: 136 m (446 ft)
- Population (2023): 125
  - Density: 17.5/km^{2} (45.4/sq mi)
- Time zone: UTC+01:00 (CET)
  - Summer (DST): UTC+02:00 (CEST)
- INSEE/Postal code: 10327 /10500
- ^{1} French Land Register data, which excludes lakes, ponds, glaciers > 1 km^{2} (0.386 sq mi or 247 acres) and river estuaries.

La Rothière (French pronunciation: [la ʁɔtjɛʁ]) is a commune in the Aube department in north-central France.

== Population ==
Historical population
Year	Pop.	±% p.a.
1968	118	—
1975	124	+0.71%
1982	117	−0.83%
1990	121	+0.42%
1999	125	+0.36%
2007	106	−2.04%
2012	110	+0.74%
2017	109	−0.18%
2023	125	+2.31%
Source: INSEE

== See also ==
- Communes of the Aube department
- Parc naturel régional de la Forêt d'Orient
- Battle of La Rothière, 1814
