= Précy (disambiguation) =

Précy is the name or part of the name of several communes in France:

- Précy, in the Cher department
- Précy-le-Sec, in the Yonne department
- Précy-Notre-Dame, in the Aube department
- Précy-Saint-Martin, in the Aube department
- Précy-sous-Thil, in the Côte-d'Or department
- Précy-sur-Marne, in the Seine-et-Marne department
- Précy-sur-Oise, in the Oise department
- Précy-sur-Vrin, in the Yonne department
