= Blignicourt =

Commune in Grand Est, France

- Commune
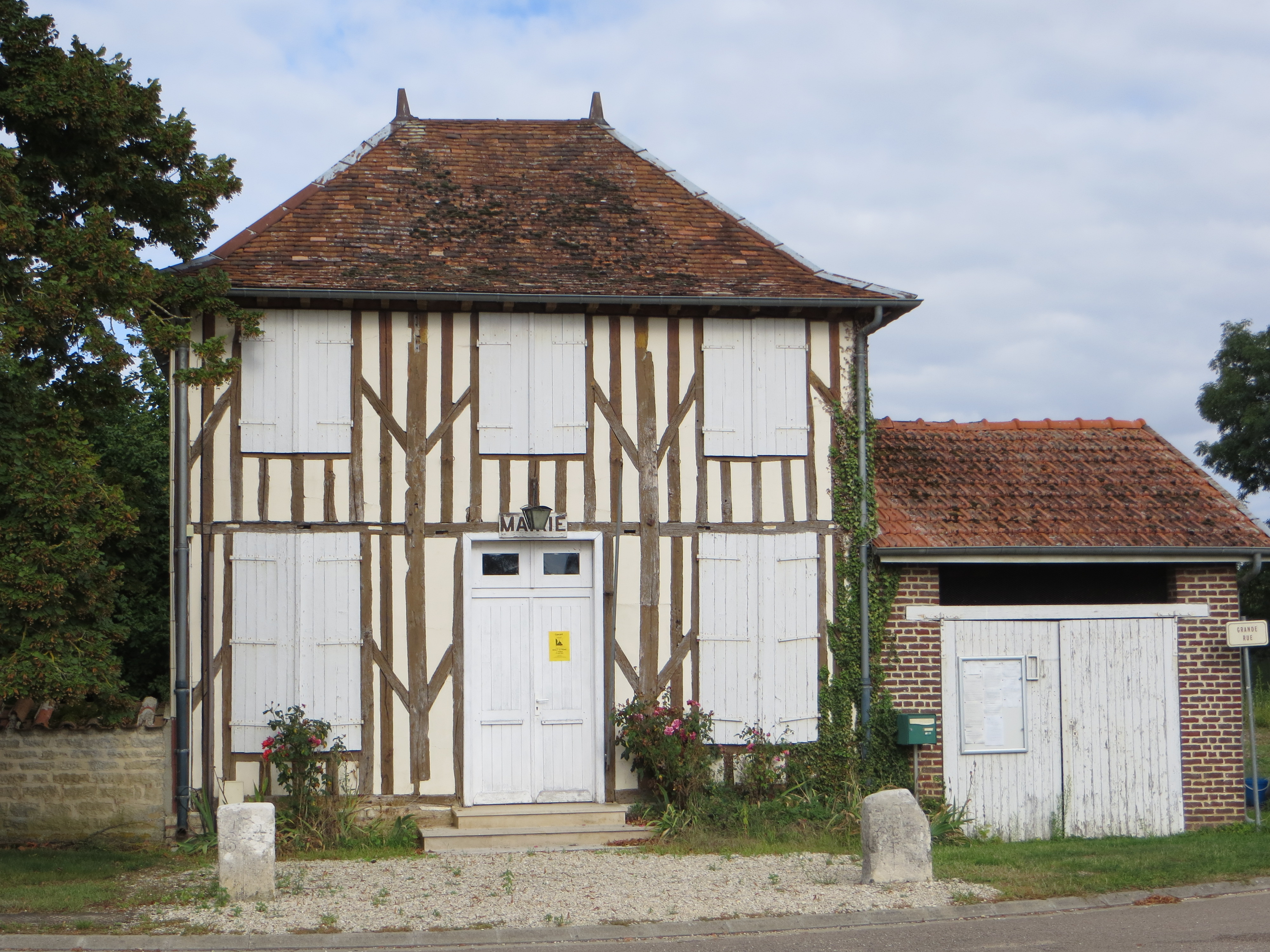
- Blignicourt Town hall
- Location of Blignicourt
- Location within France Location within Grand Est
- Coordinates: 48°27′45″N 4°31′59″E
- Country: France
- Region: Grand Est
- Department: Aube
- Arrondissement: Bar-sur-Aube
- Canton: Brienne-le-Château

Government
  - Mayor (2020–2026): François Laurent
- Area^{1}: 4.27 km^{2} (1.65 sq mi)
- Elevation: 115 m (377 ft)
- Population (2023): 40
  - Density: 9.4/km^{2} (24/sq mi)
- Time zone: UTC+01:00 (CET)
  - Summer (DST): UTC+02:00 (CEST)
- INSEE/Postal code: 10047 /10500
- ^{1} French Land Register data, which excludes lakes, ponds, glaciers > 1 km^{2} (0.386 sq mi or 247 acres) and river estuaries.

Blignicourt (French pronunciation: [bliɲikuʁ]) is a commune in the Aube department in north-central France.

== Population ==
Historical population
Year	Pop.	±% p.a.
1968	89	—
1975	64	−4.60%
1982	61	−0.68%
1990	58	−0.63%
1999	55	−0.59%
2007	50	−1.18%
2012	41	−3.89%
2017	40	−0.49%
2023	40	+0.00%
Source: INSEE

== Climate ==
As of 2000, the average annual temperature is 10.5 °C (50.9 °F), with an annual temperature range of 16 °C. The average annual cumulative precipitation is 762 mm (30 inches), with 11.6 days of precipitation in January and 8.4 days in July. In the nearby commune of Mathaux, 11 km away, the average annual temperature is 11.5 °C, with a maximum temperature recorded temperature of 41.5 °C, reached on 25 July 2019; the minimum temperature was −18 °C, reached on 2 January 1997.

== Geography ==
=== Categorization ===
As of 1 January 2024, Blignicourt is categorized as a rural commune, located outside of any major urban area. The commune is part of the larger Brienne-le-Château area, of which it is a suburban commune. This area, which includes 30 communes, has less than 50,000 inhabitants.

=== Land use ===
The commune is located within the Seine-Normandy basin. The vast majority of the land is used for agriculture, though this figure is declining (88.2% in 2018 versus 95.5% in 1990). The detailed breakdown as of 2018 is as follows: arable land (75.4%), heterogeneous land (12.9%), mines, landfills and construction sites (7.3%), forests (4.5%).

== Sights ==
- Saint-Barthélémy (Saint Bartholomew's) Church, with historic Champagne-style tiling.

== See also ==
- Communes of the Aube department
