= Rances =

Rances refers to the following places:

- Rances, Switzerland
- Rances, Aube
