= Saint-Léger-sous-Brienne =

Commune in Grand Est, France

- Commune
- Location of Saint-Léger-sous-Brienne
- Location within France Location within Grand Est
- Coordinates: 48°24′17″N 4°30′14″E
- Country: France
- Region: Grand Est
- Department: Aube
- Arrondissement: Bar-sur-Aube
- Canton: Brienne-le-Château

Government
  - Mayor (2020–2026): Didier Partout
- Area^{1}: 13.52 km^{2} (5.22 sq mi)
- Elevation: 120 m (390 ft)
- Population (2023): 373
  - Density: 27.6/km^{2} (71.5/sq mi)
- Time zone: UTC+01:00 (CET)
  - Summer (DST): UTC+02:00 (CEST)
- INSEE/Postal code: 10345 /10500
- ^{1} French Land Register data, which excludes lakes, ponds, glaciers > 1 km^{2} (0.386 sq mi or 247 acres) and river estuaries.

Saint-Léger-sous-Brienne (French pronunciation: [sɛ̃ leʒe su bʁijɛn], literally Saint-Léger under Brienne) is a commune in the Aube department in north-central France.

== Population ==
Historical population
Year	Pop.	±% p.a.
1968	275	—
1975	295	+1.01%
1982	311	+0.76%
1990	316	+0.20%
1999	344	+0.95%
2007	388	+1.52%
2012	393	+0.26%
2017	386	−0.36%
2023	373	−0.57%
Source: INSEE

== See also ==
- Communes of the Aube department
- Parc naturel régional de la Forêt d'Orient
