= Rosnay =

Rosnay may refer to the following places in France:

- Rosnay, Indre, a commune in the Indre department
- Rosnay, Marne, a commune in the Marne department
- Rosnay, Vendée, a commune in the Vendée department
- Rosnay-l'Hôpital, a commune in the Aube department

== Family name ==
- Joël de Rosnay
- Tatiana de Rosnay, French writer
- Xavier de Rosnay, French electro-house musician, see Justice (French band)
