= Maizières-lès-Brienne =

Commune in Grand Est, France

- Commune
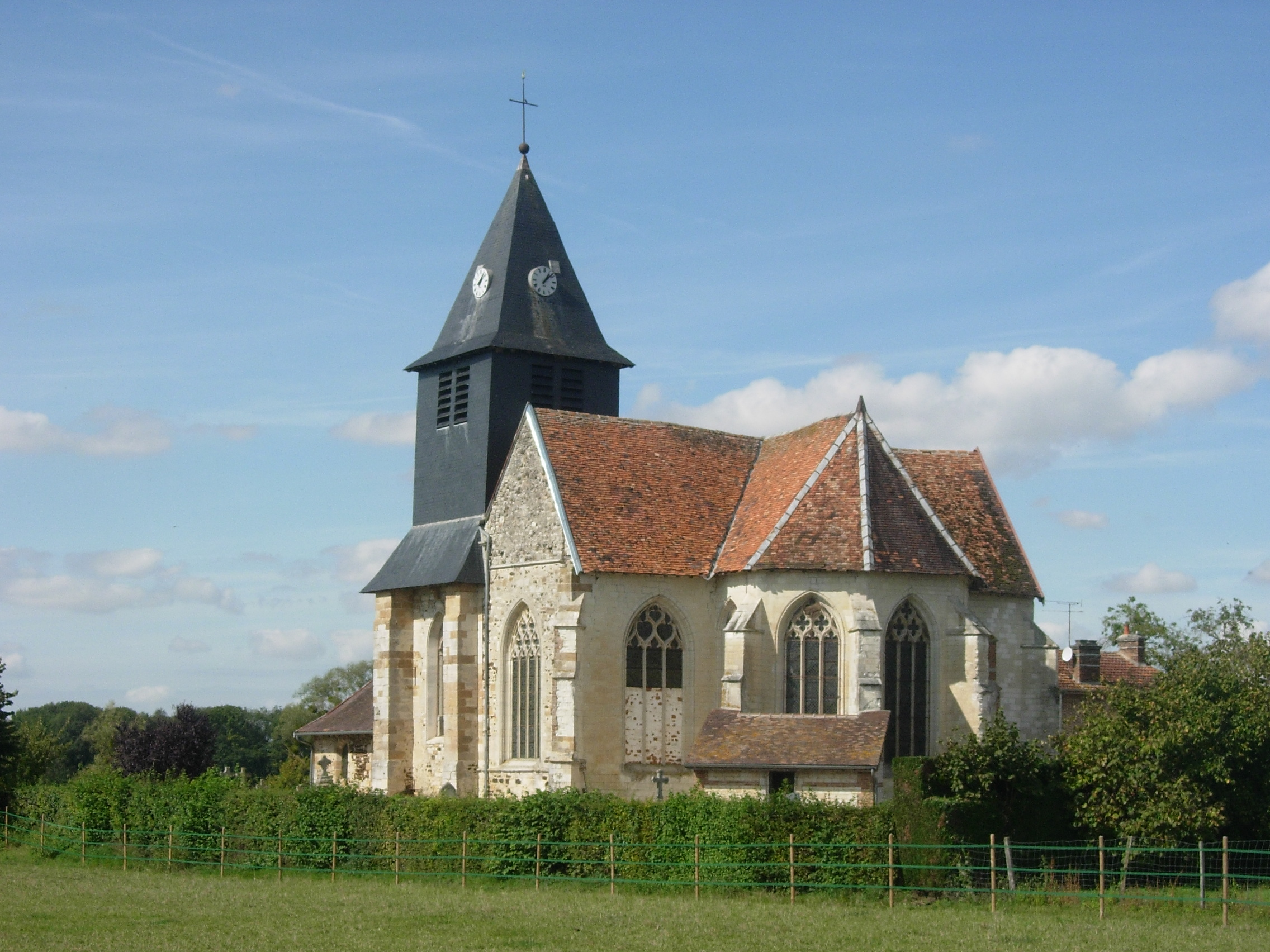
- The church in Maizières-lès-Brienne
- Location of Maizières-lès-Brienne
- Location within France Location within Grand Est
- Coordinates: 48°26′15″N 4°35′18″E
- Country: France
- Region: Grand Est
- Department: Aube
- Arrondissement: Bar-sur-Aube
- Canton: Brienne-le-Château

Government
  - Mayor (2020–2026): William Minisini
- Area^{1}: 9.5 km^{2} (3.7 sq mi)
- Elevation: 223 m (732 ft)
- Population (2023): 155
  - Density: 16/km^{2} (42/sq mi)
- Time zone: UTC+01:00 (CET)
  - Summer (DST): UTC+02:00 (CEST)
- INSEE/Postal code: 10221 /10500
- ^{1} French Land Register data, which excludes lakes, ponds, glaciers > 1 km^{2} (0.386 sq mi or 247 acres) and river estuaries.

Maizières-lès-Brienne (French pronunciation: [mɛzjɛʁ lɛ bʁijɛn], literally Maizières near Brienne) is a commune in the Aube department in north-central France.

== Population ==
Historical population
Year	Pop.	±% p.a.
1968	257	—
1975	224	−1.94%
1982	196	−1.89%
1990	161	−2.43%
1999	163	+0.14%
2007	164	+0.08%
2012	181	+1.99%
2017	164	−1.95%
2023	155	−0.94%
Source: INSEE

== See also ==
- Communes of the Aube department
- Parc naturel régional de la Forêt d'Orient
