= Perthes-lès-Brienne =

Commune in Grand Est, France

- Commune
- Location of Perthes-lès-Brienne
- Location within France Location within Grand Est
- Coordinates: 48°25′52″N 4°32′26″E
- Country: France
- Region: Grand Est
- Department: Aube
- Arrondissement: Bar-sur-Aube
- Canton: Brienne-le-Château

Government
  - Mayor (2020–2026): Jean-François Bertin
- Area^{1}: 3.63 km^{2} (1.40 sq mi)
- Elevation: 125 m (410 ft)
- Population (2023): 61
  - Density: 17/km^{2} (44/sq mi)
- Time zone: UTC+01:00 (CET)
  - Summer (DST): UTC+02:00 (CEST)
- INSEE/Postal code: 10285 /10500
- ^{1} French Land Register data, which excludes lakes, ponds, glaciers > 1 km^{2} (0.386 sq mi or 247 acres) and river estuaries.

Perthes-lès-Brienne (French pronunciation: [pɛʁt lɛ bʁijɛn], literally Perthes near Brienne) is a commune in the Aube department in north-central France.

== Population ==
Historical population
Year	Pop.	±% p.a.
1968	49	—
1975	53	+1.13%
1982	52	−0.27%
1990	48	−1.00%
1999	49	+0.23%
2007	73	+5.11%
2012	82	+2.35%
2017	81	−0.25%
2023	61	−4.62%
Source: INSEE

== See also ==
- Communes of the Aube department
