= Villeret =

Villeret may refer to:

- Villeret, Aisne, France
- Villeret, Aube, France
- Villeret, Switzerland
- Jacques Villeret, French actor
