= Juvanzé =

Commune in Grand Est, France

- Commune
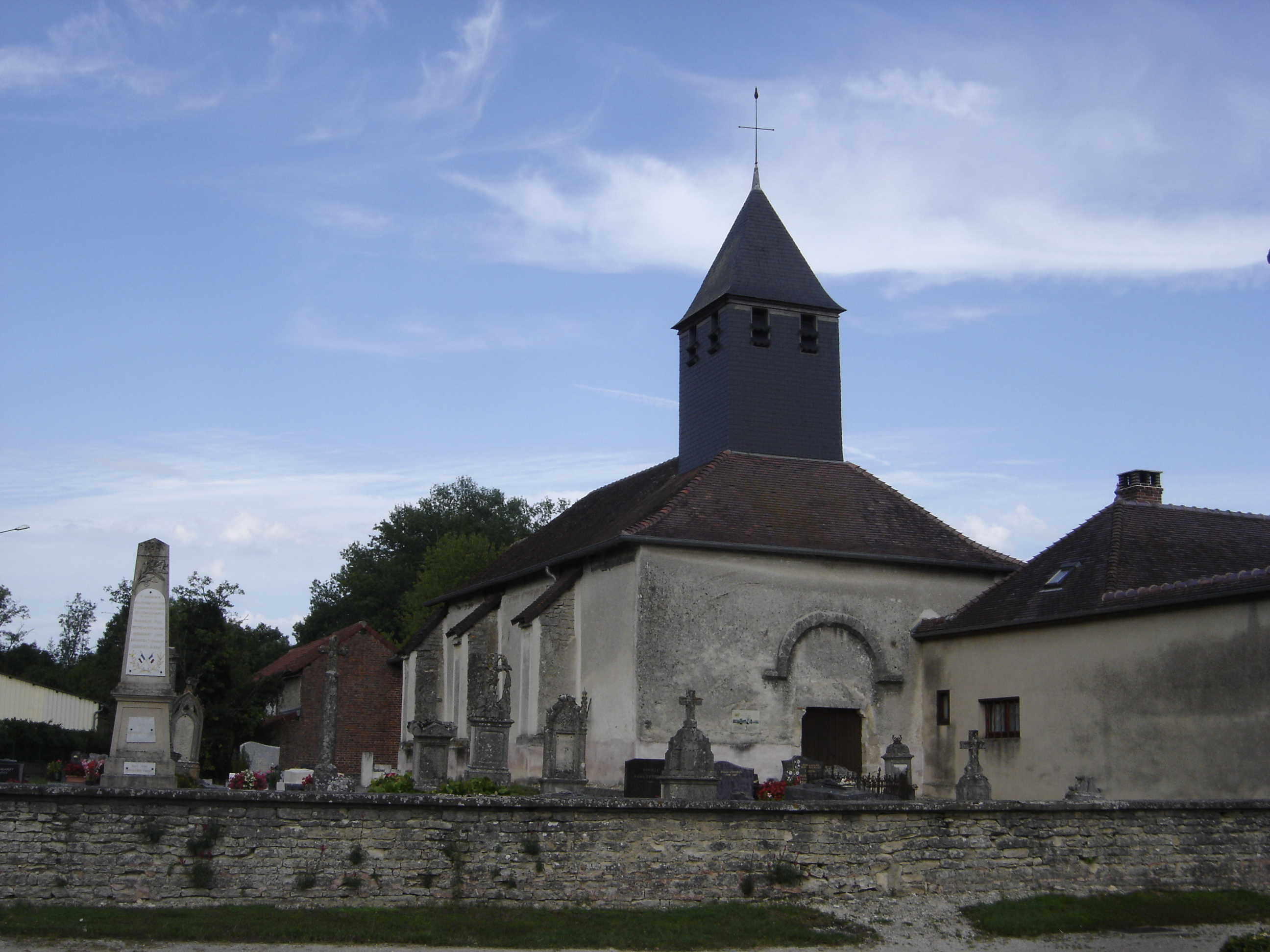
- The church in Juvanzé
- Location of Juvanzé
- Location within France Location within Grand Est
- Coordinates: 48°19′03″N 4°33′39″E
- Country: France
- Region: Grand Est
- Department: Aube
- Arrondissement: Bar-sur-Aube
- Canton: Brienne-le-Château

Government
  - Mayor (2020–2026): Gérard Bergerat
- Area^{1}: 4.94 km^{2} (1.91 sq mi)
- Elevation: 141 m (463 ft)
- Population (2023): 36
  - Density: 7.3/km^{2} (19/sq mi)
- Time zone: UTC+01:00 (CET)
  - Summer (DST): UTC+02:00 (CEST)
- INSEE/Postal code: 10183 /10140
- ^{1} French Land Register data, which excludes lakes, ponds, glaciers > 1 km^{2} (0.386 sq mi or 247 acres) and river estuaries.

Juvanzé (French pronunciation: [ʒyvɑ̃ze]) is a commune in the Aube department in the Grand Est region in north-central France.

Juvanzé is a small, isolated hamlet with about 20 houses and a population of 34 full-time residents, with upwards to about 50 residents in total during the summers when the mainly Parisien second-home owners flock to its quiet tranquility with their families. Originally called "Jouvanzé", this village, situated between Unienville and Trannes, has traces dating back to the High Middle Ages, as evident in a medieval statue (the original statue recently moved to the Louvre Museum in Paris) adorning the river side bank housed by a very small stone chapel. The village was founded by the Abbey of Beaulieu in the 12th century for the mills which had been constructed there. The land next to Juvanzé is intersected by a Roman road which follows a North-South trajectory linking Langres to Chalôns.

== Climate ==
Juvanzé is subject to typically harsh winters, with temperatures occasionally falling to -20 °C, while in the summertime temperatures can reach an almost-blistering 40 °C.

== Economy ==
Juvanzé supplies its own electrical power thanks to a hydroelectric generator built on the river. Juvanzé is home to many domestic farm animals providing the residents with such nourishment as meat, milk, and eggs.

== Population ==
Historical population
| Year | Pop. | ±% p.a. |
|---|---|---|
| 1968 | 36 | — |
| 1975 | 32 | −1.67% |
| 1982 | 22 | −5.21% |
| 1990 | 27 | +2.59% |
| 1999 | 37 | +3.56% |
| 2007 | 32 | −1.80% |
| 2012 | 26 | −4.07% |
| 2017 | 35 | +6.13% |
| 2023 | 36 | +0.47% |
Source: INSEE

== Tourism ==
The Juvanzé Lakes, shallow landlocked lakes just behind the village across the river Aube, are a destination for carp fishing.

== See also ==
- Communes of the Aube department
- Parc naturel régional de la Forêt d'Orient
