= Yèvres-le-Petit =

Commune in Grand Est, France

- Commune
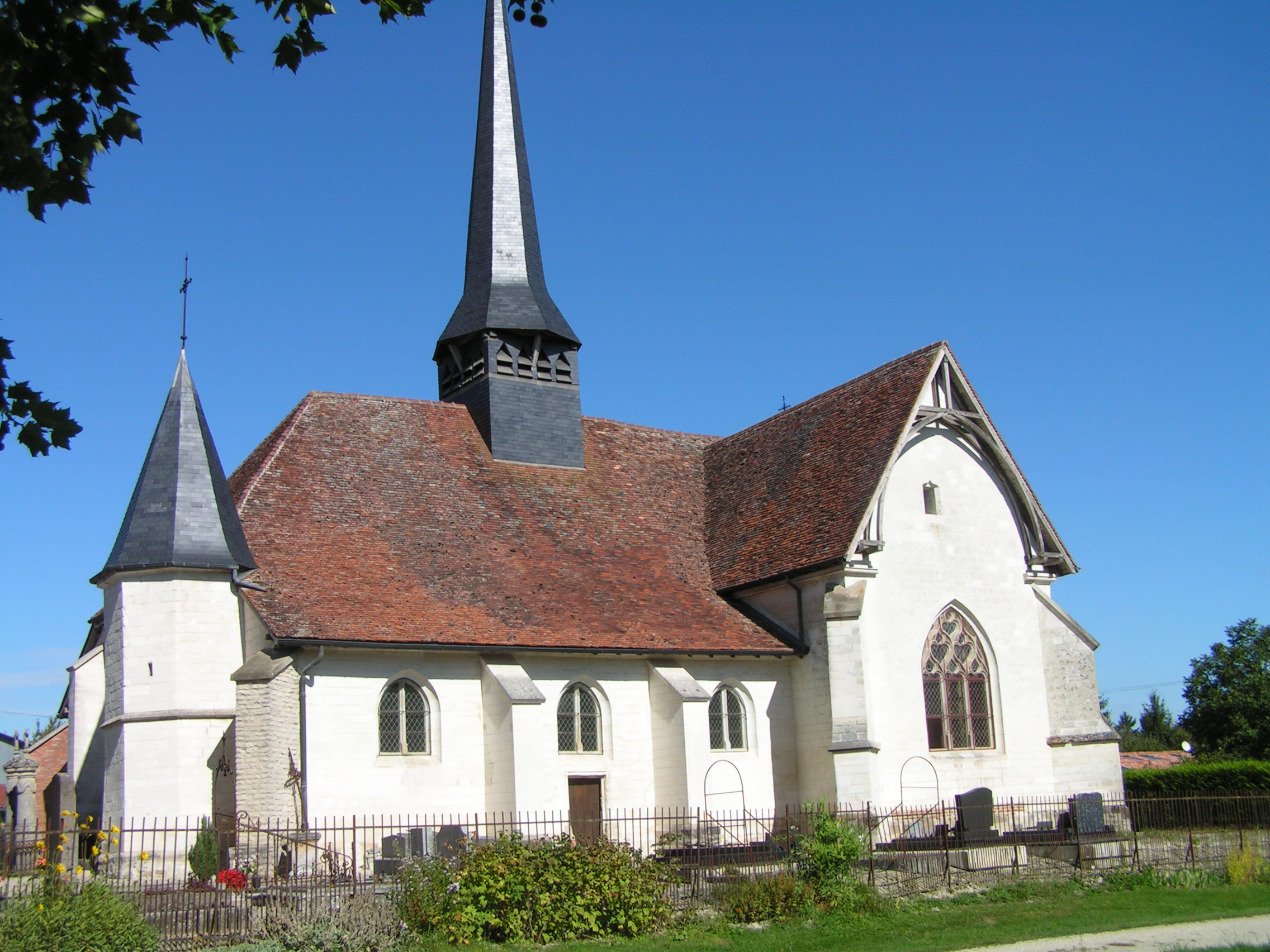
- Church
- Location of Yèvres-le-Petit
- Location within France Location within Grand Est
- Coordinates: 48°28′46″N 4°29′29″E
- Country: France
- Region: Grand Est
- Department: Aube
- Arrondissement: Bar-sur-Aube
- Canton: Brienne-le-Château
- Intercommunality: Lacs de Champagne

Government
  - Mayor (2020–2026): Marie-Christine Mignot-Vedrenne
- Area^{1}: 8.35 km^{2} (3.22 sq mi)
- Elevation: 120 m (390 ft)
- Population (2023): 55
  - Density: 6.6/km^{2} (17/sq mi)
- Time zone: UTC+01:00 (CET)
  - Summer (DST): UTC+02:00 (CEST)
- INSEE/Postal code: 10445 /10500
- ^{1} French Land Register data, which excludes lakes, ponds, glaciers > 1 km^{2} (0.386 sq mi or 247 acres) and river estuaries.

Yèvres-le-Petit (French pronunciation: [jɛvʁ lə pəti]) is a commune in the Aube department in north-central France.

== Population ==
Historical population
| Year | Pop. | ±% p.a. |
|---|---|---|
| 1968 | 81 | — |
| 1975 | 73 | −1.47% |
| 1982 | 68 | −1.01% |
| 1990 | 59 | −1.76% |
| 1999 | 67 | +1.42% |
| 2007 | 73 | +1.08% |
| 2012 | 67 | −1.70% |
| 2017 | 57 | −3.18% |
| 2023 | 55 | −0.59% |
Source: INSEE

== See also ==
- Communes of the Aube department
