= Pel-et-Der =

Commune in Grand Est, France

- Commune
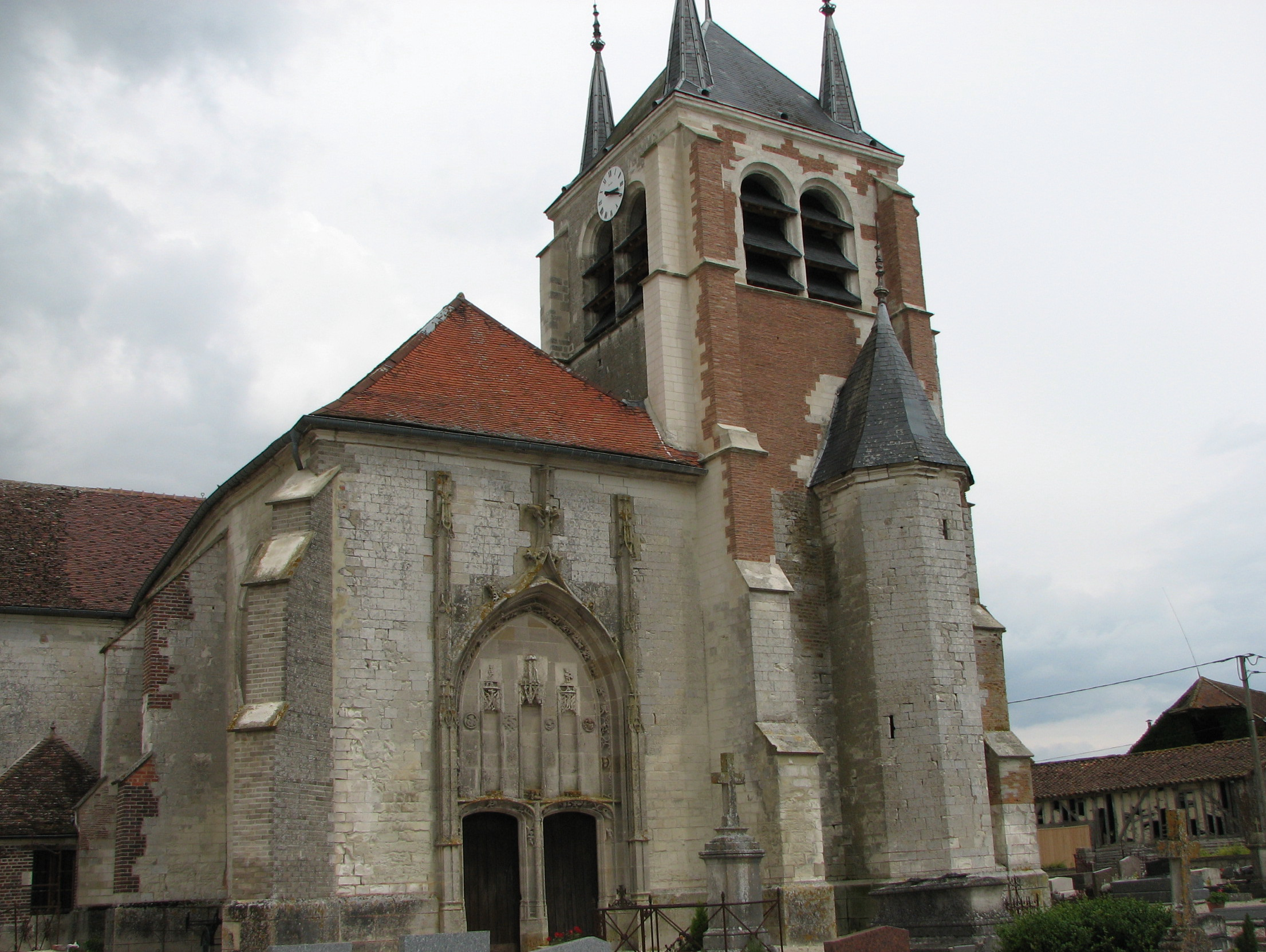
- The church in Pel-et-Der
- Location of Pel-et-Der
- Location within France Location within Grand Est
- Coordinates: 48°24′06″N 4°24′59″E
- Country: France
- Region: Grand Est
- Department: Aube
- Arrondissement: Bar-sur-Aube
- Canton: Brienne-le-Château

Government
  - Mayor (2020–2026): Dany Dubuisson
- Area^{1}: 13.18 km^{2} (5.09 sq mi)
- Elevation: 125 m (410 ft)
- Population (2023): 128
  - Density: 9.71/km^{2} (25.2/sq mi)
- Time zone: UTC+01:00 (CET)
  - Summer (DST): UTC+02:00 (CEST)
- INSEE/Postal code: 10283 /10500
- ^{1} French Land Register data, which excludes lakes, ponds, glaciers > 1 km^{2} (0.386 sq mi or 247 acres) and river estuaries.

Pel-et-Der (French pronunciation: [pɛl e dɛʁ]) is a commune in the Aube department in north-central France.

== Population ==
Historical population
Year	Pop.	±% p.a.
1968	176	—
1975	161	−1.26%
1982	146	−1.39%
1990	138	−0.70%
1999	141	+0.24%
2007	149	+0.69%
2012	147	−0.27%
2017	133	−1.98%
2023	128	−0.64%
Source: INSEE

== See also ==
- Communes of the Aube department
- Parc naturel régional de la Forêt d'Orient
