= Onjon =

Commune in Grand Est, France

- Commune
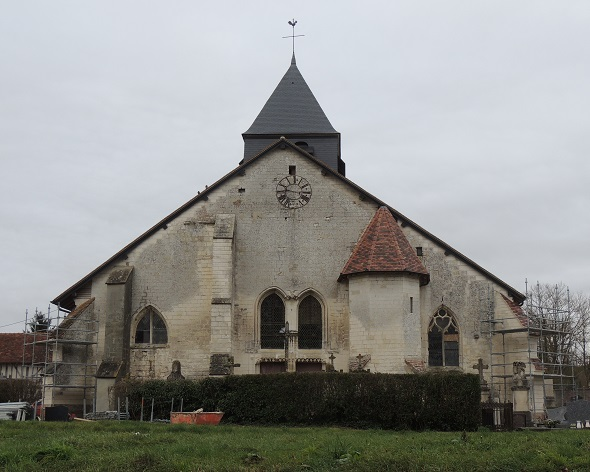
- The church in Onjon

- Coat of arms
- Location of Onjon
- Location within France Location within Grand Est
- Coordinates: 48°23′46″N 4°16′57″E
- Country: France
- Region: Grand Est
- Department: Aube
- Arrondissement: Troyes
- Canton: Brienne-le-Château
- Intercommunality: Forêts, lacs, terres en Champagne

Government
  - Mayor (2020–2026): Michel Canot
- Area^{1}: 22.31 km^{2} (8.61 sq mi)
- Elevation: 126 m (413 ft)
- Population (2023): 258
  - Density: 11.6/km^{2} (30.0/sq mi)
- Time zone: UTC+01:00 (CET)
  - Summer (DST): UTC+02:00 (CEST)
- INSEE/Postal code: 10270 /10220
- ^{1} French Land Register data, which excludes lakes, ponds, glaciers > 1 km^{2} (0.386 sq mi or 247 acres) and river estuaries.

Onjon (French pronunciation: [ɔ̃ʒɔ̃]) is a commune in the Aube department in north-central France.

== Population ==
Historical population
Year	Pop.	±% p.a.
1968	284	—
1975	245	−2.09%
1982	228	−1.02%
1990	232	+0.22%
1999	240	+0.38%
2007	244	+0.21%
2012	250	+0.49%
2017	250	+0.00%
2023	258	+0.53%
Source: INSEE

== See also ==
- Communes of the Aube department
- Parc naturel régional de la Forêt d'Orient
