= Hampigny =

Commune in Grand Est, France

- Commune
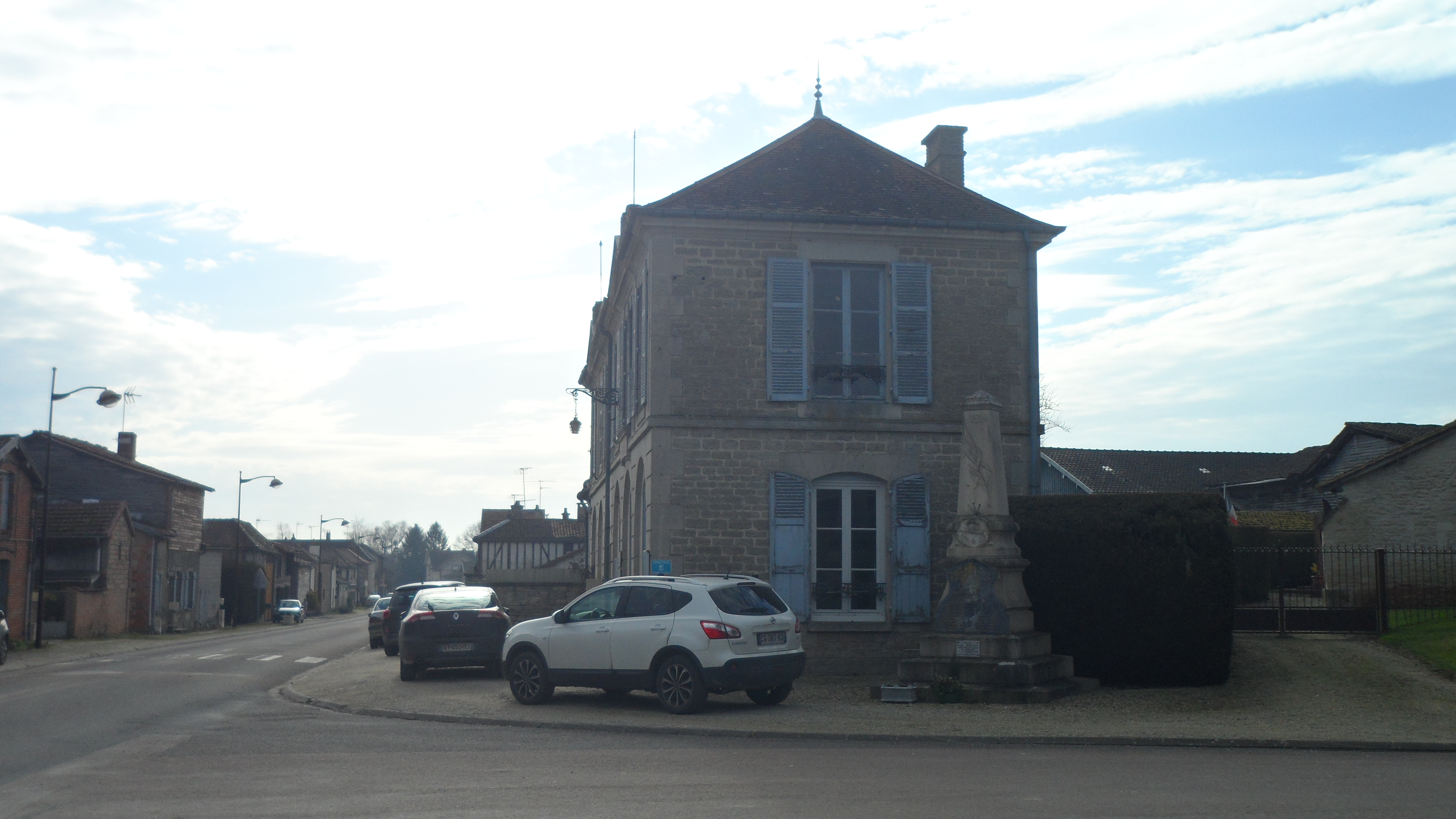
- The town hall in Hampigny
- Location of Hampigny
- Location within France Location within Grand Est
- Coordinates: 48°27′24″N 4°35′26″E
- Country: France
- Region: Grand Est
- Department: Aube
- Arrondissement: Bar-sur-Aube
- Canton: Brienne-le-Château

Government
  - Mayor (2020–2026): Hervé Chambon
- Area^{1}: 9.49 km^{2} (3.66 sq mi)
- Elevation: 122 m (400 ft)
- Highest elevation: 126 m (413 ft)
- Lowest elevation: 113 m (371 ft)
- Population (2023): 217
  - Density: 22.9/km^{2} (59.2/sq mi)
- Time zone: UTC+01:00 (CET)
  - Summer (DST): UTC+02:00 (CEST)
- INSEE/Postal code: 10171 /10500
- ^{1} French Land Register data, which excludes lakes, ponds, glaciers > 1 km^{2} (0.386 sq mi or 247 acres) and river estuaries.

Hampigny (French pronunciation: [ɑ̃piɲi]) is a commune in the Aube department in north-central France.

== Population ==
Historical population
Year	Pop.	±% p.a.
1968	322	—
1975	280	−1.98%
1982	288	+0.40%
1990	263	−1.13%
1999	241	−0.97%
2007	255	+0.71%
2012	253	−0.16%
2017	238	−1.21%
2023	217	−1.53%
Source: INSEE

== See also ==
- Communes of the Aube department
