= Saint-Christophe-Dodinicourt =

Commune in Grand Est, France

- Commune
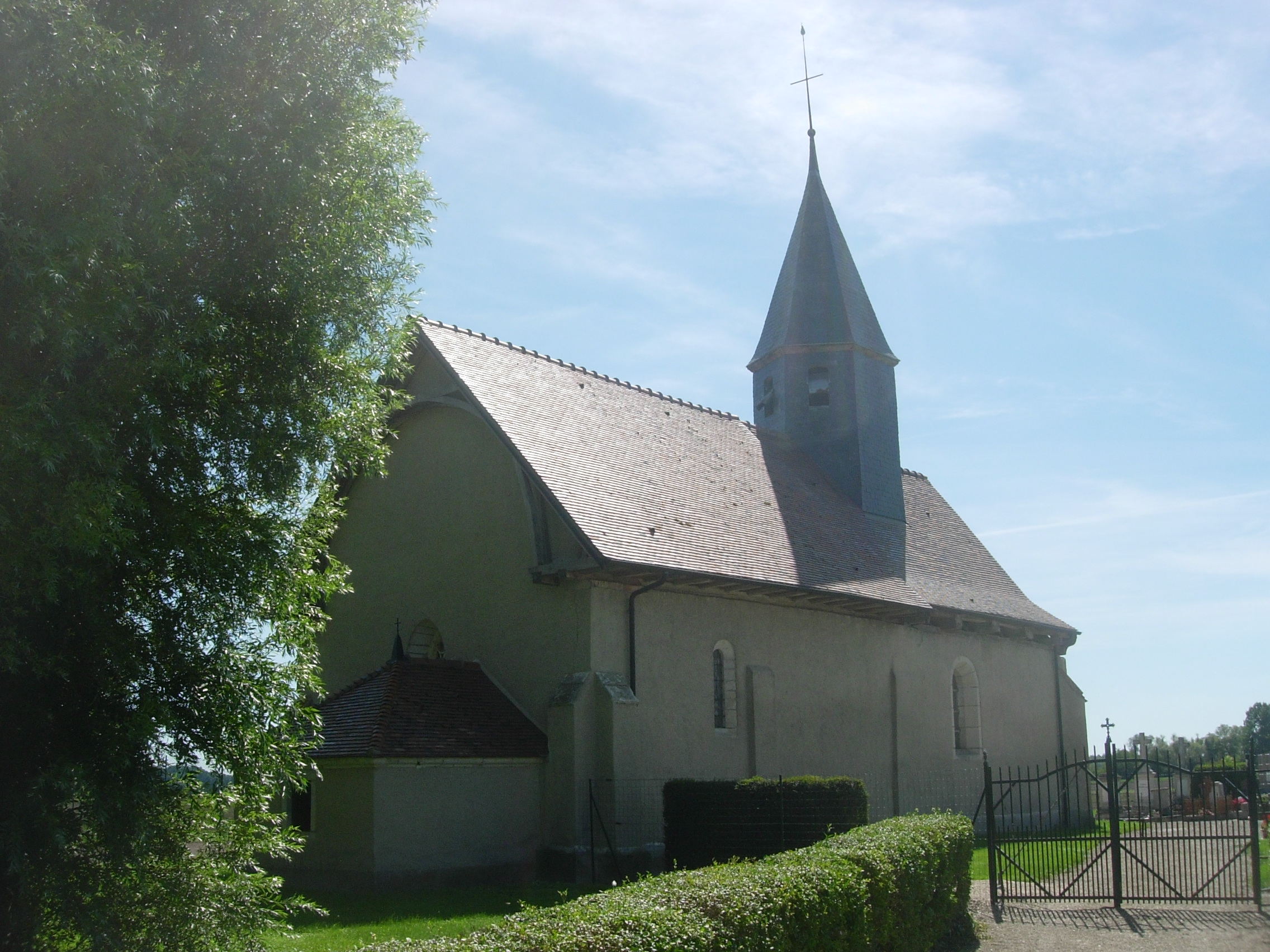
- The church in Saint-Christophe-Dodinicourt
- Location of Saint-Christophe-Dodinicourt
- Location within France Location within Grand Est
- Coordinates: 48°26′23″N 4°28′15″E
- Country: France
- Region: Grand Est
- Department: Aube
- Arrondissement: Bar-sur-Aube
- Canton: Brienne-le-Château

Government
  - Mayor (2020–2026): Roger Robert
- Area^{1}: 4.87 km^{2} (1.88 sq mi)
- Elevation: 112 m (367 ft)
- Population (2023): 31
  - Density: 6.4/km^{2} (16/sq mi)
- Time zone: UTC+01:00 (CET)
  - Summer (DST): UTC+02:00 (CEST)
- INSEE/Postal code: 10337 /10500
- ^{1} French Land Register data, which excludes lakes, ponds, glaciers > 1 km^{2} (0.386 sq mi or 247 acres) and river estuaries.

Saint-Christophe-Dodinicourt (French pronunciation: [sɛ̃ kʁistɔf dɔdinikuʁ]) is a commune in the Aube department in north-central France.

== Population ==
Historical population
Year	Pop.	±% p.a.
1968	39	—
1975	22	−7.85%
1982	41	+9.30%
1990	43	+0.60%
1999	42	−0.26%
2007	38	−1.24%
2012	32	−3.38%
2017	34	+1.22%
2023	31	−1.53%
Source: INSEE

== See also ==
- Communes of the Aube department
- Parc naturel régional de la Forêt d'Orient
