= Magnicourt =

Commune in Grand Est, France

- Commune
- Location of Magnicourt
- Location within France Location within Grand Est
- Coordinates: 48°27′06″N 4°22′51″E
- Country: France
- Region: Grand Est
- Department: Aube
- Arrondissement: Bar-sur-Aube
- Canton: Brienne-le-Château

Government
  - Mayor (2020–2026): Marcel Ceunebroucke
- Area^{1}: 7.89 km^{2} (3.05 sq mi)
- Elevation: 101 m (331 ft)
- Population (2023): 83
  - Density: 11/km^{2} (27/sq mi)
- Time zone: UTC+01:00 (CET)
  - Summer (DST): UTC+02:00 (CEST)
- INSEE/Postal code: 10214 /10240
- ^{1} French Land Register data, which excludes lakes, ponds, glaciers > 1 km^{2} (0.386 sq mi or 247 acres) and river estuaries.

Magnicourt (French pronunciation: [maɲikuʁ]) is a commune in the Aube department in north-central France.

== Population ==
Historical population
Year	Pop.	±% p.a.
1968	81	—
1975	70	−2.06%
1982	82	+2.29%
1990	79	−0.46%
1999	69	−1.49%
2007	67	−0.37%
2012	68	+0.30%
2017	82	+3.82%
2023	83	+0.20%
Source: INSEE

== See also ==
- Communes of the Aube department
