= Rouilly-Sacey =

Commune in Grand Est, France

- Commune
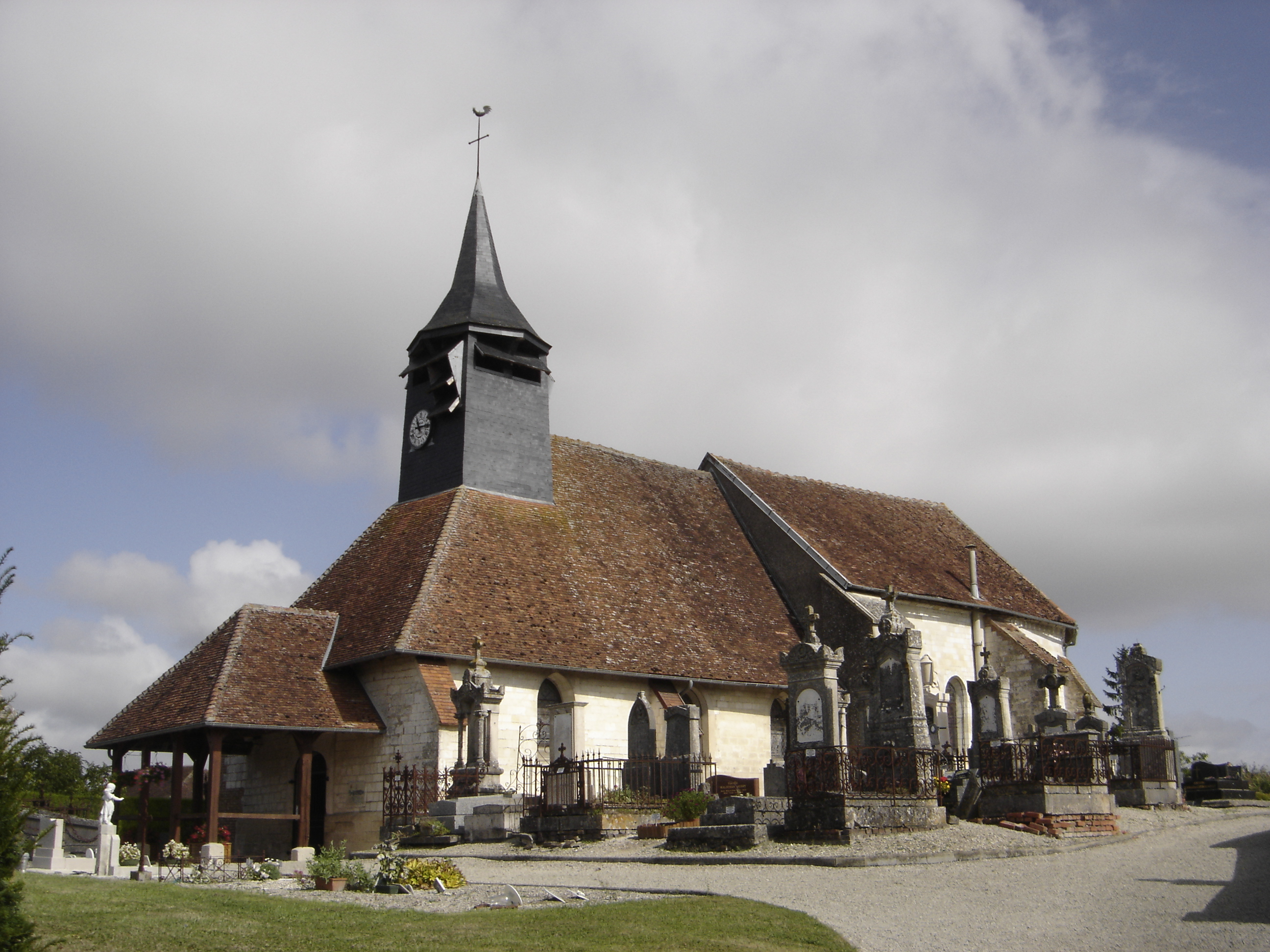
- The church of Saint-Martin in Rouilly
- Location of Rouilly-Sacey
- Location within France Location within Grand Est
- Coordinates: 48°20′49″N 4°15′47″E
- Country: France
- Region: Grand Est
- Department: Aube
- Arrondissement: Troyes
- Canton: Brienne-le-Château
- Intercommunality: Forêts, lacs, terres en Champagne

Government
  - Mayor (2020–2026): Patrick Dyon
- Area^{1}: 19.48 km^{2} (7.52 sq mi)
- Elevation: 118 m (387 ft)
- Highest elevation: 188 m (617 ft)
- Lowest elevation: 113 m (371 ft)
- Population (2023): 387
  - Density: 19.9/km^{2} (51.5/sq mi)
- Time zone: UTC+01:00 (CET)
  - Summer (DST): UTC+02:00 (CEST)
- INSEE/Postal code: 10328 /10220
- ^{1} French Land Register data, which excludes lakes, ponds, glaciers > 1 km^{2} (0.386 sq mi or 247 acres) and river estuaries.

Rouilly-Sacey (French pronunciation: [ʁuji sasɛ]) is a commune in the Aube department in north-central France.

== Population ==
Historical population
Year	Pop.	±% p.a.
1968	254	—
1975	296	+2.21%
1982	361	+2.88%
1990	342	−0.67%
1999	341	−0.03%
2007	330	−0.41%
2012	383	+3.02%
2017	386	+0.16%
2023	387	+0.04%
Source: INSEE

== See also ==
- Communes of the Aube department
- Parc naturel régional de la Forêt d'Orient
