= Saint-Léger-sous-Margerie =

Commune in Grand Est, France

- Commune
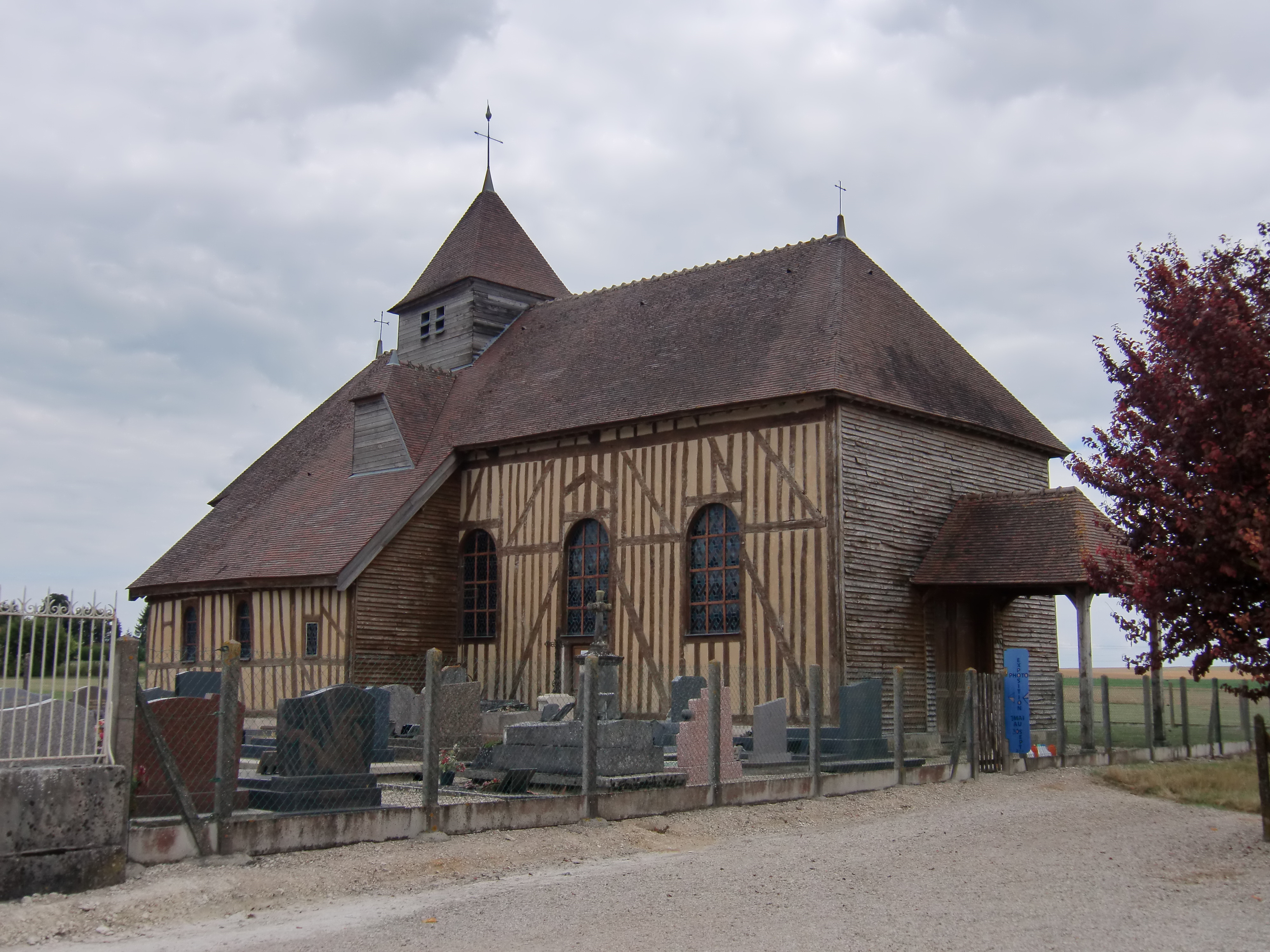
- The church in Saint-Léger-sous-Margerie
- Location of Saint-Léger-sous-Margerie
- Location within France Location within Grand Est
- Coordinates: 48°31′57″N 4°29′19″E
- Country: France
- Region: Grand Est
- Department: Aube
- Arrondissement: Bar-sur-Aube
- Canton: Brienne-le-Château

Government
  - Mayor (2020–2026): Jean-Pierre Bondroit
- Area^{1}: 6.58 km^{2} (2.54 sq mi)
- Elevation: 115 m (377 ft)
- Population (2023): 51
  - Density: 7.8/km^{2} (20/sq mi)
- Time zone: UTC+01:00 (CET)
  - Summer (DST): UTC+02:00 (CEST)
- INSEE/Postal code: 10346 /10330
- ^{1} French Land Register data, which excludes lakes, ponds, glaciers > 1 km^{2} (0.386 sq mi or 247 acres) and river estuaries.

Saint-Léger-sous-Margerie (French pronunciation: [sɛ̃ leʒe su maʁʒəʁi], literally Saint-Léger under Margerie) is a commune in the Aube department in north-central France.

== Population ==
Historical population
Year	Pop.	±% p.a.
1968	87	—
1975	65	−4.08%
1982	55	−2.36%
1990	65	+2.11%
1999	81	+2.48%
2007	61	−3.48%
2012	54	−2.41%
2017	59	+1.79%
2023	51	−2.40%
Source: INSEE

== See also ==
- Communes of the Aube department
