= Arrembécourt =

Commune in Grand Est, France

- Commune
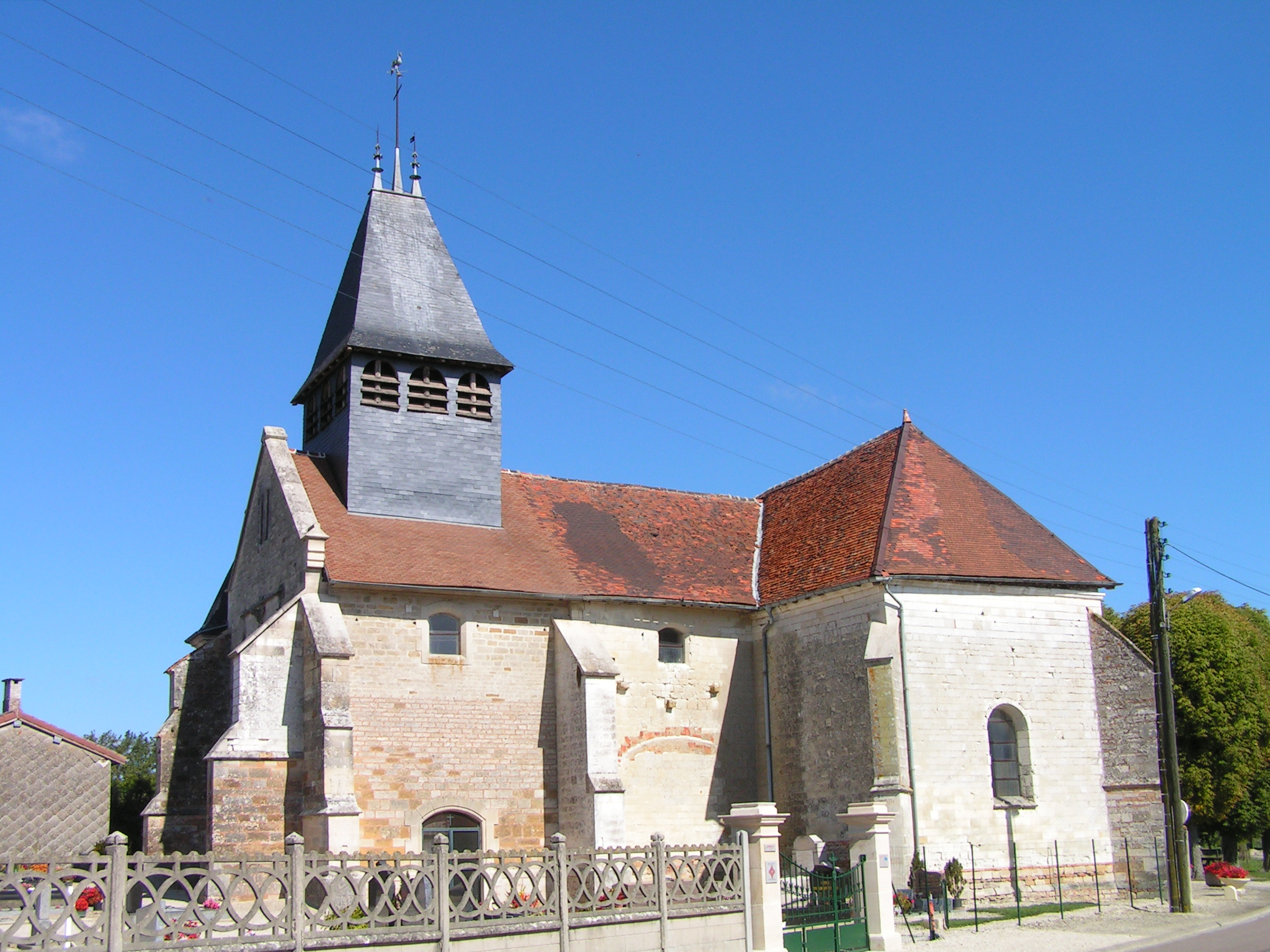
- The church in Arrembécourt
- Location of Arrembécourt
- Location within France Location within Grand Est
- Coordinates: 48°32′36″N 4°35′53″E
- Country: France
- Region: Grand Est
- Department: Aube
- Arrondissement: Bar-sur-Aube
- Canton: Brienne-le-Château
- Intercommunality: Lacs de Champagne

Government
  - Mayor (2020–2026): Bernadette Herbin
- Area^{1}: 7.12 km^{2} (2.75 sq mi)
- Elevation: 125 m (410 ft)
- Population (2023): 47
  - Density: 6.6/km^{2} (17/sq mi)
- Time zone: UTC+01:00 (CET)
  - Summer (DST): UTC+02:00 (CEST)
- INSEE/Postal code: 10010 /10330
- ^{1} French Land Register data, which excludes lakes, ponds, glaciers > 1 km^{2} (0.386 sq mi or 247 acres) and river estuaries.

Arrembécourt (French pronunciation: [aʁɑ̃bekuʁ]) is a commune in the Aube department in north-central France.

== Administration ==
List of mayors

From	To	Name	Party	Position
/1857		Choppin		
2001	2008	Jacques Parfait		
2008		Bernadette Herbin		
2014	2020	Christian Bouchet		
2020	2026	Olivier Hoquet		
15 March 2026		Bernadette Herbin		

== Population ==
Historical population
Year	Pop.	±% p.a.
1968	62	—
1975	60	−0.47%
1982	60	+0.00%
1990	49	−2.50%
1999	41	−1.96%
2007	44	+0.89%
2012	52	+3.40%
2017	50	−0.78%
2023	47	−1.03%
Source: INSEE

== See also ==
- Communes of the Aube department
