= Dosches =

Commune in Grand Est, France

- Commune
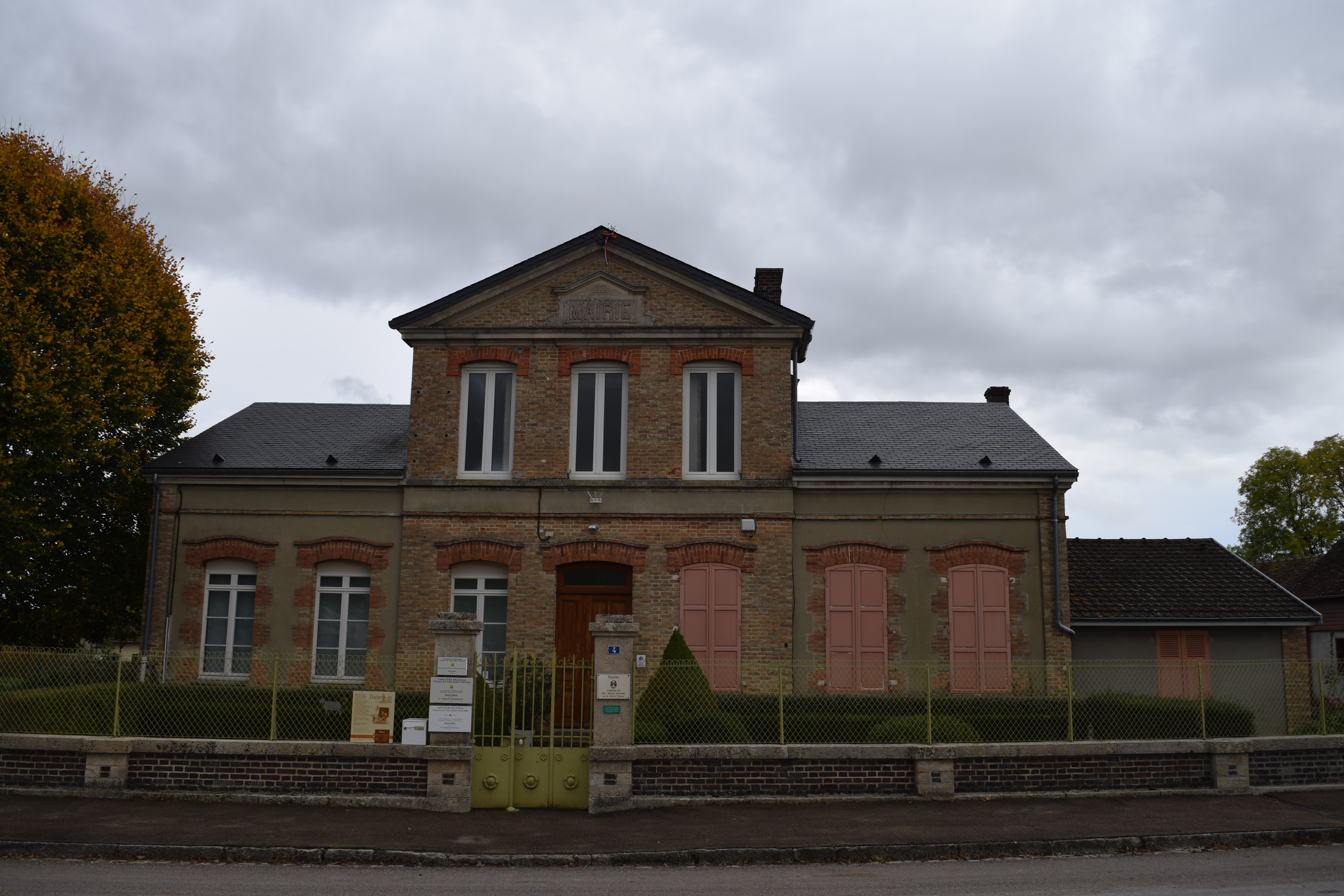
- The town hall in Dosches
- Location of Dosches
- Location within France Location within Grand Est
- Coordinates: 48°19′18″N 4°15′02″E
- Country: France
- Region: Grand Est
- Department: Aube
- Arrondissement: Troyes
- Canton: Brienne-le-Château
- Intercommunality: Forêts, lacs, terres en Champagne

Government
  - Mayor (2020–2026): Jean-François Chaume
- Area^{1}: 20.64 km^{2} (7.97 sq mi)
- Elevation: 125 m (410 ft)
- Population (2023): 312
  - Density: 15.1/km^{2} (39.2/sq mi)
- Time zone: UTC+01:00 (CET)
  - Summer (DST): UTC+02:00 (CEST)
- INSEE/Postal code: 10129 /10220
- ^{1} French Land Register data, which excludes lakes, ponds, glaciers > 1 km^{2} (0.386 sq mi or 247 acres) and river estuaries.

Dosches (French pronunciation: [dɔʃ]) is a commune in the Aube department in north-central France.

== Population ==
Historical population
Year	Pop.	±% p.a.
1968	178	—
1975	159	−1.60%
1982	196	+3.03%
1990	237	+2.40%
1999	237	+0.00%
2007	283	+2.24%
2012	299	+1.11%
2017	295	−0.27%
2023	312	+0.94%
Source: INSEE

== See also ==
- Communes of the Aube department
- Parc naturel régional de la Forêt d'Orient
