= Blaincourt-sur-Aube =

Commune in Grand Est, France

- Commune
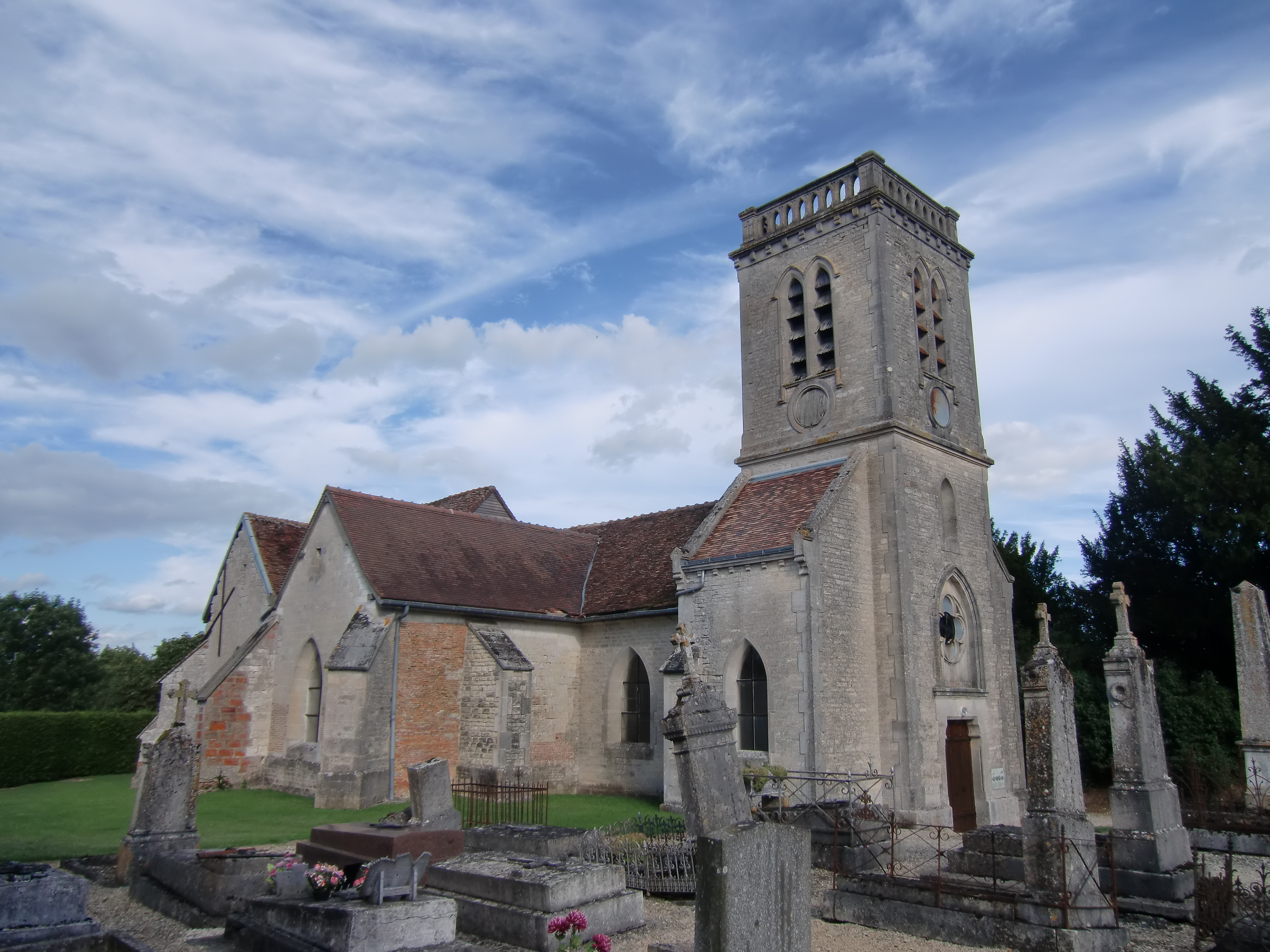
- The church in Blaincourt-sur-Aube
- Location of Blaincourt-sur-Aube
- Location within France Location within Grand Est
- Coordinates: 48°23′26″N 4°27′18″E
- Country: France
- Region: Grand Est
- Department: Aube
- Arrondissement: Bar-sur-Aube
- Canton: Brienne-le-Château

Government
  - Mayor (2020–2026): Francis Choffé
- Area^{1}: 5.79 km^{2} (2.24 sq mi)
- Elevation: 125 m (410 ft)
- Population (2023): 97
  - Density: 17/km^{2} (43/sq mi)
- Time zone: UTC+01:00 (CET)
  - Summer (DST): UTC+02:00 (CEST)
- INSEE/Postal code: 10046 /10500
- ^{1} French Land Register data, which excludes lakes, ponds, glaciers > 1 km^{2} (0.386 sq mi or 247 acres) and river estuaries.

Blaincourt-sur-Aube (French pronunciation: [blɛ̃kuʁ syʁ ob], literally Blaincourt on Aube) is a commune in the Aube department in north-central France.

== Population ==
Historical population
Year	Pop.	±% p.a.
1968	111	—
1975	102	−1.20%
1982	105	+0.41%
1990	86	−2.46%
1999	87	+0.13%
2007	95	+1.11%
2012	97	+0.42%
2017	109	+2.36%
2023	97	−1.93%
Source: INSEE

== See also ==
- Communes of the Aube department
- Parc naturel régional de la Forêt d'Orient
