= Lassicourt =

Commune in Grand Est, France

- Commune
- Location of Lassicourt
- Location within France Location within Grand Est
- Coordinates: 48°26′37″N 4°29′24″E
- Country: France
- Region: Grand Est
- Department: Aube
- Arrondissement: Bar-sur-Aube
- Canton: Brienne-le-Château

Government
  - Mayor (2020–2026): Denis Hunin
- Area^{1}: 7.73 km^{2} (2.98 sq mi)
- Elevation: 113 m (371 ft)
- Population (2023): 55
  - Density: 7.1/km^{2} (18/sq mi)
- Time zone: UTC+01:00 (CET)
  - Summer (DST): UTC+02:00 (CEST)
- INSEE/Postal code: 10189 /10500
- ^{1} French Land Register data, which excludes lakes, ponds, glaciers > 1 km^{2} (0.386 sq mi or 247 acres) and river estuaries.

Lassicourt (French pronunciation: [lasikuʁ]) is a commune in the Aube department in north-central France.

== Population ==
Historical population
Year	Pop.	±% p.a.
1968	66	—
1975	70	+0.84%
1982	82	+2.29%
1990	72	−1.61%
1999	54	−3.15%
2007	54	+0.00%
2012	70	+5.33%
2017	63	−2.09%
2023	55	−2.24%
Source: INSEE

== See also ==
- Communes of the Aube department
- Parc naturel régional de la Forêt d'Orient
