= Joncreuil =

Commune in Grand Est, France

- Commune
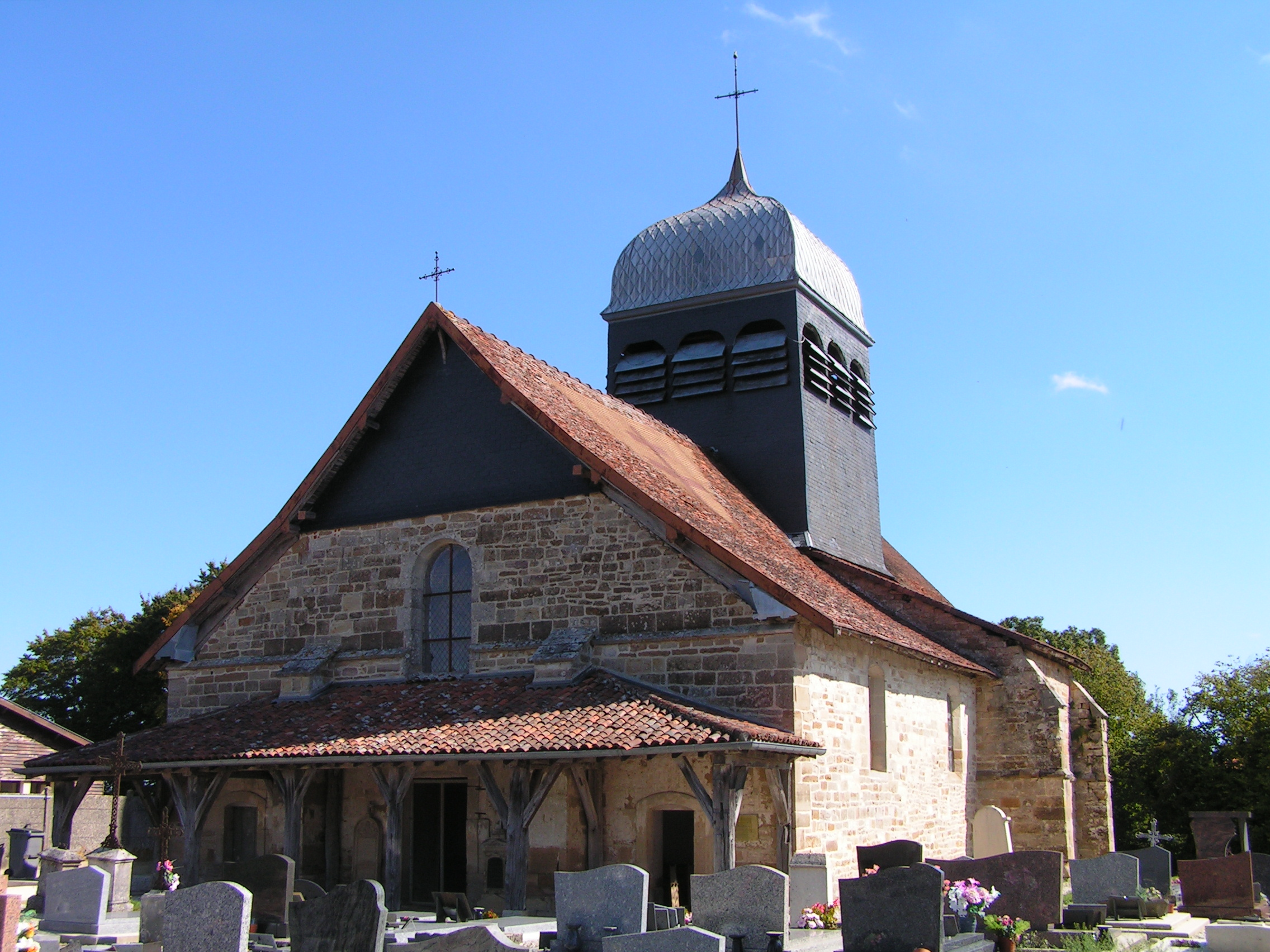
- The church in Joncreuil

- Coat of arms
- Location of Joncreuil
- Location within France Location within Grand Est
- Coordinates: 48°31′23″N 4°36′48″E
- Country: France
- Region: Grand Est
- Department: Aube
- Arrondissement: Bar-sur-Aube
- Canton: Brienne-le-Château

Government
  - Mayor (2020–2026): Alain Michel
- Area^{1}: 10.55 km^{2} (4.07 sq mi)
- Elevation: 132 m (433 ft)
- Population (2023): 90
  - Density: 8.5/km^{2} (22/sq mi)
- Time zone: UTC+01:00 (CET)
  - Summer (DST): UTC+02:00 (CEST)
- INSEE/Postal code: 10180 /10330
- ^{1} French Land Register data, which excludes lakes, ponds, glaciers > 1 km^{2} (0.386 sq mi or 247 acres) and river estuaries.

Joncreuil (French pronunciation: [ʒɔ̃kʁœj]) is a commune in the Aube department in northeastern France.

== Population ==
Historical population
Year	Pop.	±% p.a.
1968	92	—
1975	102	+1.48%
1982	85	−2.57%
1990	96	+1.53%
1999	87	−1.09%
2007	98	+1.50%
2012	83	−3.27%
2017	92	+2.08%
2023	90	−0.37%
Source: INSEE

== See also ==
- Communes of the Aube department
