= Molins-sur-Aube =

Commune in Grand Est, France

- Commune
- Location of Molins-sur-Aube
- Location within France Location within Grand Est
- Coordinates: 48°26′09″N 4°22′50″E
- Country: France
- Region: Grand Est
- Department: Aube
- Arrondissement: Bar-sur-Aube
- Canton: Brienne-le-Château

Government
  - Mayor (2020–2026): Gilles Jacquard
- Area^{1}: 6.26 km^{2} (2.42 sq mi)
- Elevation: 113 m (371 ft)
- Population (2023): 102
  - Density: 16.3/km^{2} (42.2/sq mi)
- Time zone: UTC+01:00 (CET)
  - Summer (DST): UTC+02:00 (CEST)
- INSEE/Postal code: 10243 /10500
- ^{1} French Land Register data, which excludes lakes, ponds, glaciers > 1 km^{2} (0.386 sq mi or 247 acres) and river estuaries.

Molins-sur-Aube (French pronunciation: [mɔlɛ̃ syʁ ob], literally Molins on Aube) is a commune in the Aube department in north-central France.

== Population ==
Historical population
Year	Pop.	±% p.a.
1968	104	—
1975	85	−2.84%
1982	70	−2.74%
1990	96	+4.03%
1999	85	−1.34%
2007	112	+3.51%
2012	106	−1.10%
2017	108	+0.37%
2023	102	−0.95%
Source: INSEE

== See also ==
- Communes of the Aube department
- Parc naturel régional de la Forêt d'Orient
