= Épagne =

Commune in Grand Est, France

- Commune
- Location of Épagne
- Location within France Location within Grand Est
- Coordinates: 48°23′41″N 4°27′56″E
- Country: France
- Region: Grand Est
- Department: Aube
- Arrondissement: Bar-sur-Aube
- Canton: Brienne-le-Château

Government
  - Mayor (2020–2026): Francis Doizelet
- Area^{1}: 3.94 km^{2} (1.52 sq mi)
- Elevation: 125 m (410 ft)
- Population (2023): 126
  - Density: 32.0/km^{2} (82.8/sq mi)
- Time zone: UTC+01:00 (CET)
  - Summer (DST): UTC+02:00 (CEST)
- INSEE/Postal code: 10138 /10500
- ^{1} French Land Register data, which excludes lakes, ponds, glaciers > 1 km^{2} (0.386 sq mi or 247 acres) and river estuaries.

Épagne (French pronunciation: [epaɲ]) is a commune in the Aube department in north-central France.

== Population ==
Historical population
Year	Pop.	±% p.a.
1968	144	—
1975	126	−1.89%
1982	105	−2.57%
1990	107	+0.24%
1999	102	−0.53%
2007	111	+1.06%
2012	124	+2.24%
2017	136	+1.86%
2023	126	−1.26%
Source: INSEE

== See also ==
- Communes of the Aube department
- Parc naturel régional de la Forêt d'Orient
