= Canton of Brienne-le-Château =

Coordinates: 48.39°N 4.53°E

- Canton
- Situation of the canton of Brienne-le-Château in the department of Aube
- Country: France
- Region: Grand Est
- Department: Aube
- No. of communes: {{{nbcomm}}}
- Population (2023): 13,560
- INSEE code: 1005

The canton of Brienne-le-Château is an administrative division of the Aube department, northeastern France. Its borders were modified at the French canton reorganisation which came into effect in March 2015. Its seat is in Brienne-le-Château.

It consists of the following communes:

1. Arrembécourt
2. Assencières
3. Aulnay
4. Bailly-le-Franc
5. Balignicourt
6. Bétignicourt
7. Blaincourt-sur-Aube
8. Blignicourt
9. Bouy-Luxembourg
10. Braux
11. Brévonnes
12. Brienne-la-Vieille
13. Brienne-le-Château
14. Chalette-sur-Voire
15. Chavanges
16. Courcelles-sur-Voire
17. Dienville
18. Donnement
19. Dosches
20. Épagne
21. Géraudot
22. Hampigny
23. Jasseines
24. Joncreuil
25. Juvanzé
26. Lassicourt
27. Lentilles
28. Lesmont
29. Magnicourt
30. Maizières-lès-Brienne
31. Mathaux
32. Mesnil-Sellières
33. Molins-sur-Aube
34. Montmorency-Beaufort
35. Onjon
36. Pars-lès-Chavanges
37. Pel-et-Der
38. Perthes-lès-Brienne
39. Piney
40. Précy-Notre-Dame
41. Précy-Saint-Martin
42. Radonvilliers
43. Rances
44. Rosnay-l'Hôpital
45. Rouilly-Sacey
46. Saint-Christophe-Dodinicourt
47. Saint-Léger-sous-Brienne
48. Saint-Léger-sous-Margerie
49. Unienville
50. Val-d'Auzon
51. Vallentigny
52. Villeret
53. Yèvres-le-Petit
