= Bétignicourt =

Commune in Grand Est, France

- Commune
- Coat of arms
- Location of Bétignicourt
- Location within France Location within Grand Est
- Coordinates: 48°26′50″N 4°27′23″E
- Country: France
- Region: Grand Est
- Department: Aube
- Arrondissement: Bar-sur-Aube
- Canton: Brienne-le-Château

Government
  - Mayor (2020–2026): Guillaume Beudot
- Area^{1}: 3.18 km^{2} (1.23 sq mi)
- Elevation: 112 m (367 ft)
- Highest elevation: 168 m (551 ft)
- Lowest elevation: 107 m (351 ft)
- Population (2023): 31
  - Density: 9.7/km^{2} (25/sq mi)
- Time zone: UTC+01:00 (CET)
  - Summer (DST): UTC+02:00 (CEST)
- INSEE/Postal code: 10044 /10500
- ^{1} French Land Register data, which excludes lakes, ponds, glaciers > 1 km^{2} (0.386 sq mi or 247 acres) and river estuaries.

Bétignicourt (French pronunciation: [betiɲikuʁ]) is a commune in the Aube department in north-central France.

== Population ==
Historical population
Year	Pop.	±% p.a.
1968	40	—
1975	43	+1.04%
1982	39	−1.39%
1990	34	−1.70%
1999	37	+0.94%
2007	32	−1.80%
2012	31	−0.63%
2017	33	+1.26%
2023	31	−1.04%
Source: INSEE

== See also ==
- Communes of the Aube department
