= Bouy-Luxembourg =

Commune in Grand Est, France

- Commune
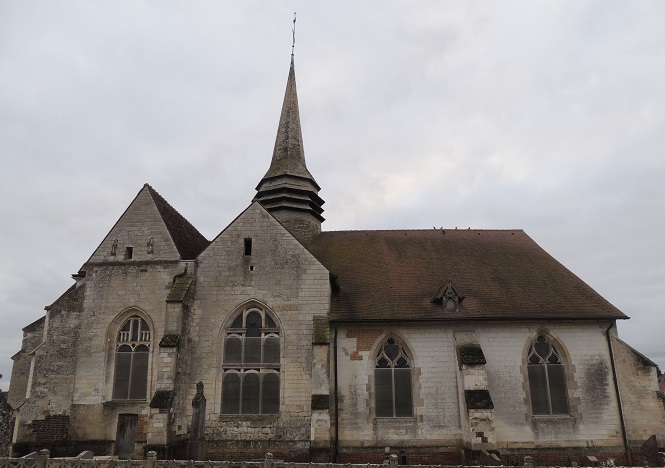
- The church in Bouy-Luxembourg

- Coat of arms
- Location of Bouy-Luxembourg
- Location within France Location within Grand Est
- Coordinates: 48°22′45″N 4°15′28″E
- Country: France
- Region: Grand Est
- Department: Aube
- Arrondissement: Troyes
- Canton: Brienne-le-Château
- Intercommunality: Forêts, lacs, terres en Champagne

Government
  - Mayor (2020–2026): Eric Debouy
- Area^{1}: 12.04 km^{2} (4.65 sq mi)
- Elevation: 164 m (538 ft)
- Population (2023): 243
  - Density: 20.2/km^{2} (52.3/sq mi)
- Time zone: UTC+01:00 (CET)
  - Summer (DST): UTC+02:00 (CEST)
- INSEE/Postal code: 10056 /10220
- ^{1} French Land Register data, which excludes lakes, ponds, glaciers > 1 km^{2} (0.386 sq mi or 247 acres) and river estuaries.

Bouy-Luxembourg (French pronunciation: [bwi lyksɑ̃buʁ]) is a commune in the Aube department in north-central France.

== Population ==
Historical population
Year	Pop.	±% p.a.
1968	181	—
1975	150	−2.65%
1982	156	+0.56%
1990	169	+1.01%
1999	160	−0.61%
2007	187	+1.97%
2012	210	+2.35%
2017	228	+1.66%
2023	243	+1.07%
Source: INSEE

== See also ==
- Communes of the Aube department
