= Lentilles =

Commune in Grand Est, Aube, France

- Commune
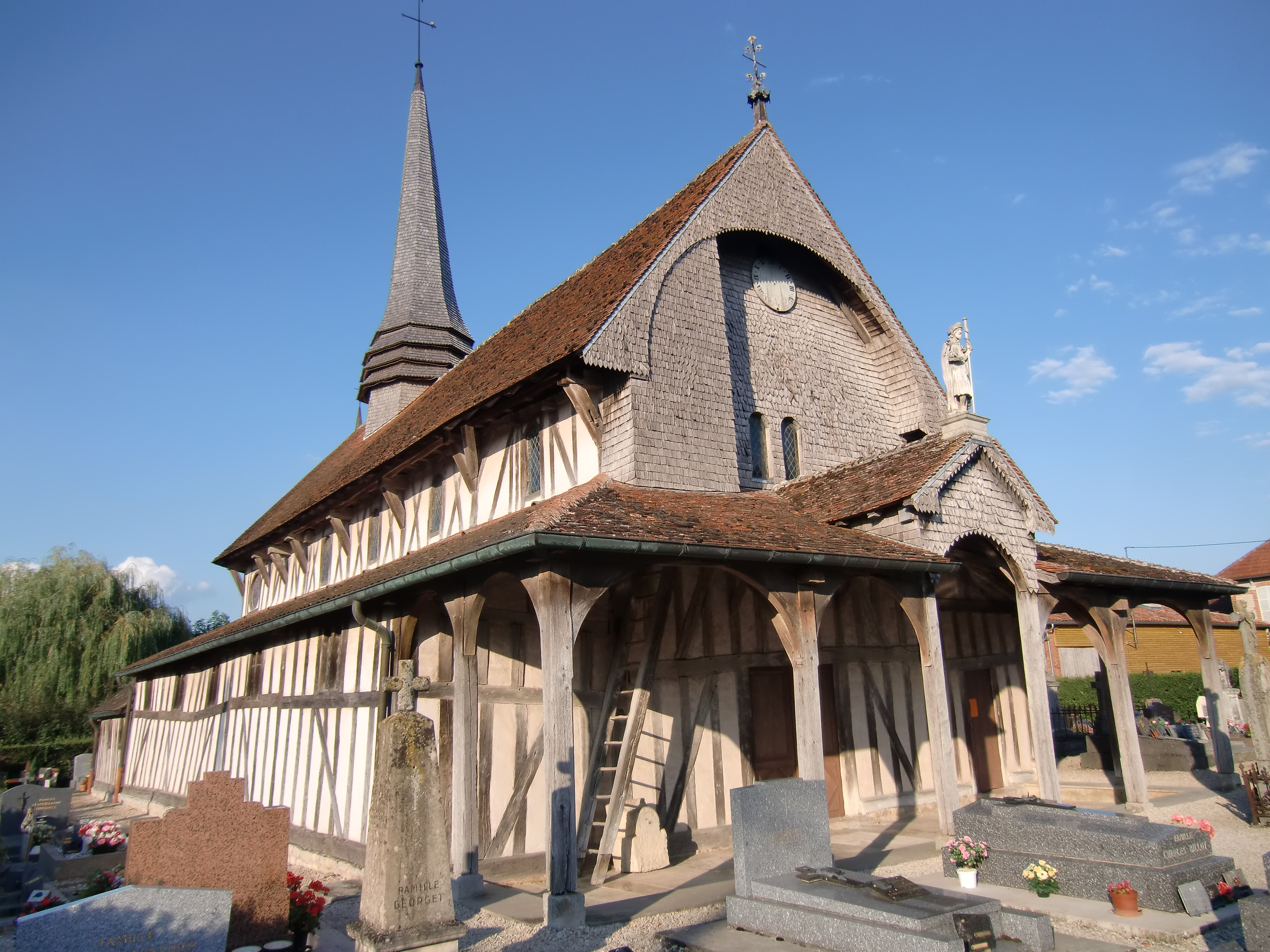
- The church in Lentilles
- Location of Lentilles
- Location within France Location within Grand Est
- Coordinates: 48°29′03″N 4°36′44″E
- Country: France
- Region: Grand Est
- Department: Aube
- Arrondissement: Bar-sur-Aube
- Canton: Brienne-le-Château

Government
  - Mayor (2020–2026): Elisabeth Brouillard
- Area^{1}: 17.18 km^{2} (6.63 sq mi)
- Elevation: 116 m (381 ft)
- Population (2023): 128
  - Density: 7.45/km^{2} (19.3/sq mi)
- Time zone: UTC+01:00 (CET)
  - Summer (DST): UTC+02:00 (CEST)
- INSEE/Postal code: 10192 /10330
- ^{1} French Land Register data, which excludes lakes, ponds, glaciers > 1 km^{2} (0.386 sq mi or 247 acres) and river estuaries.

Lentilles (French pronunciation: [lɑ̃tij]) is a commune in the Aube department in north-central France.

== Population ==
Historical population
Year	Pop.	±% p.a.
1968	199	—
1975	183	−1.19%
1982	183	+0.00%
1990	143	−3.04%
1999	108	−3.07%
2007	97	−1.33%
2012	110	+2.55%
2017	125	+2.59%
2023	128	+0.40%
Source: INSEE

== See also ==
- Communes of the Aube department
