= Donnement =

Commune in Grand Est, France

- Commune
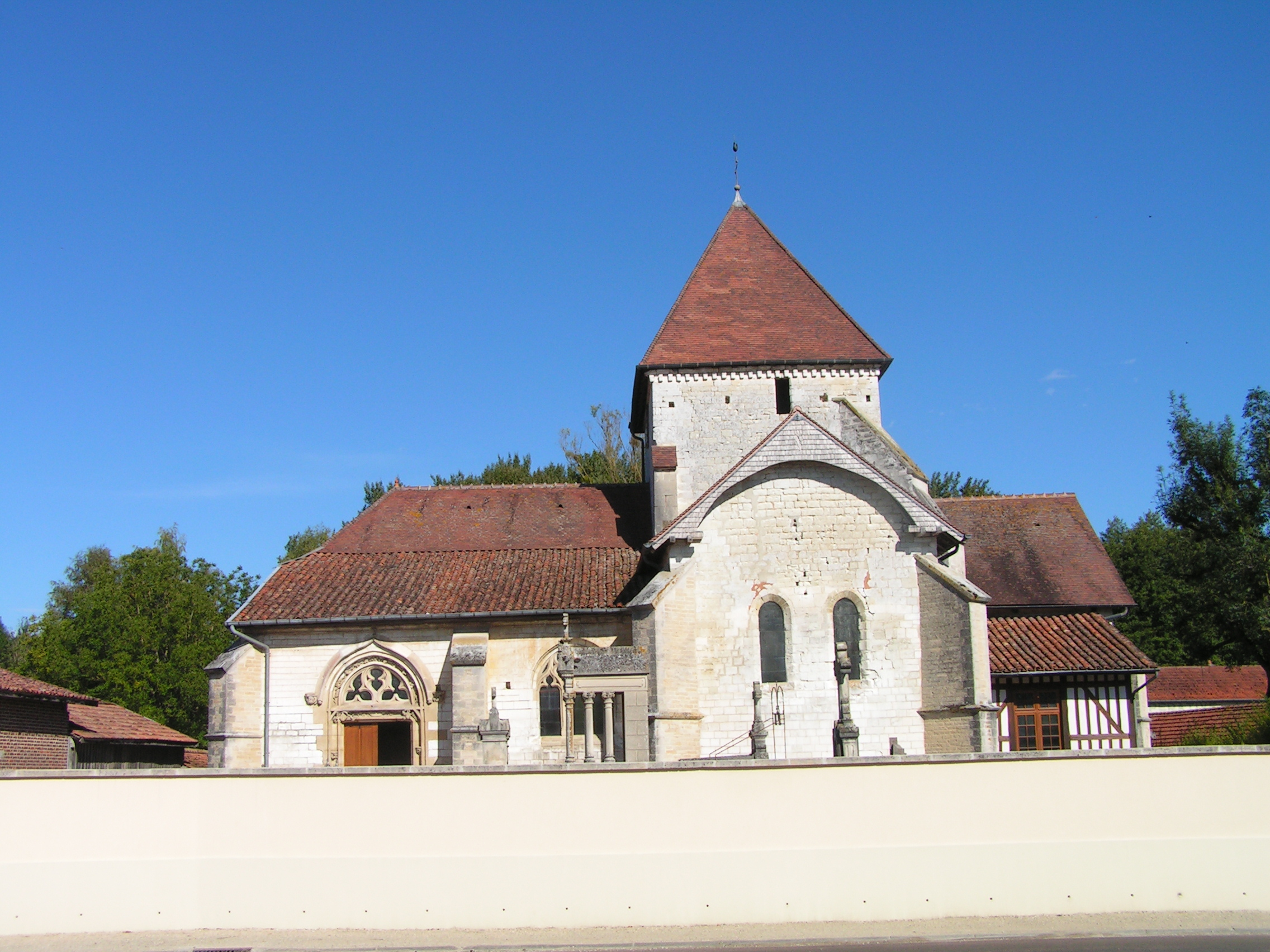
- The church in Donnement
- Location of Donnement
- Location within France Location within Grand Est
- Coordinates: 48°30′46″N 4°26′13″E
- Country: France
- Region: Grand Est
- Department: Aube
- Arrondissement: Bar-sur-Aube
- Canton: Brienne-le-Château

Government
  - Mayor (2020–2026): Thérèse Lens
- Area^{1}: 11.24 km^{2} (4.34 sq mi)
- Elevation: 108 m (354 ft)
- Highest elevation: 182 m (597 ft)
- Lowest elevation: 112 m (367 ft)
- Population (2023): 71
  - Density: 6.3/km^{2} (16/sq mi)
- Time zone: UTC+01:00 (CET)
  - Summer (DST): UTC+02:00 (CEST)
- INSEE/Postal code: 10128 /10330
- ^{1} French Land Register data, which excludes lakes, ponds, glaciers > 1 km^{2} (0.386 sq mi or 247 acres) and river estuaries.

Donnement (French pronunciation: [dɔnmɑ̃]) is a commune in the Aube department in north-central France. The main road passing through the town is the D56.

== Population ==
Historical population
Year	Pop.	±% p.a.
1968	194	—
1975	165	−2.29%
1982	128	−3.56%
1990	101	−2.92%
1999	111	+1.05%
2007	91	−2.45%
2012	80	−2.54%
2017	77	−0.76%
2023	71	−1.34%
Source: INSEE

== See also ==
- Communes of the Aube department
