= Vallentigny =

Commune in Grand Est, France

- Commune
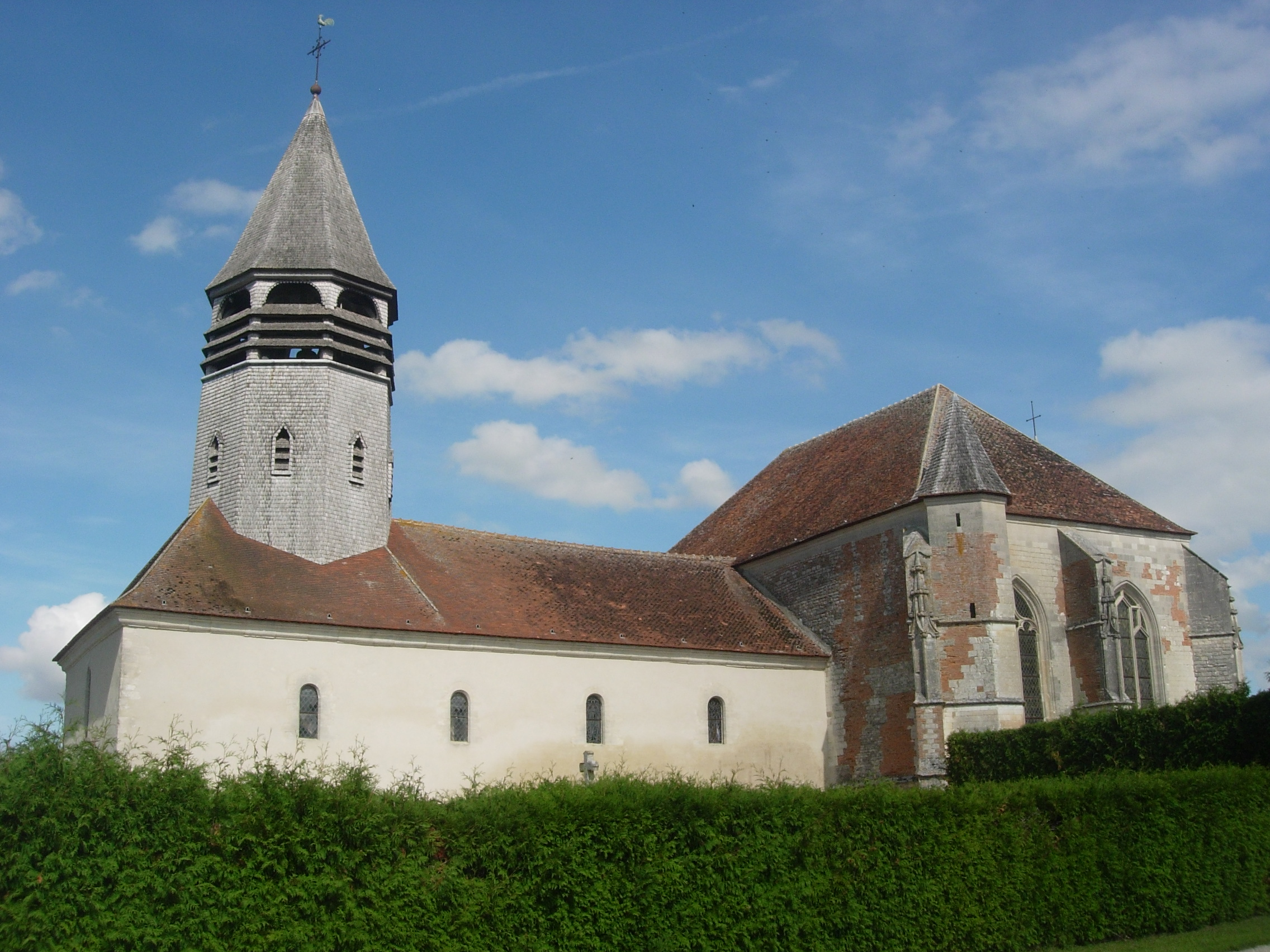
- The church in Vallentigny

- Coat of arms
- Location of Vallentigny
- Location within France Location within Grand Est
- Coordinates: 48°26′50″N 4°34′53″E
- Country: France
- Region: Grand Est
- Department: Aube
- Arrondissement: Bar-sur-Aube
- Canton: Brienne-le-Château

Government
  - Mayor (2020–2026): Bruno Dezobry
- Area^{1}: 15.74 km^{2} (6.08 sq mi)
- Elevation: 119 m (390 ft)
- Population (2023): 188
  - Density: 11.9/km^{2} (30.9/sq mi)
- Time zone: UTC+01:00 (CET)
  - Summer (DST): UTC+02:00 (CEST)
- INSEE/Postal code: 10393 /10500
- ^{1} French Land Register data, which excludes lakes, ponds, glaciers > 1 km^{2} (0.386 sq mi or 247 acres) and river estuaries.

Vallentigny (French pronunciation: [valɑ̃tiɲi]) is a commune in the Aube department in north-central France.

== Population ==
Historical population
Year	Pop.	±% p.a.
1968	380	—
1975	314	−2.69%
1982	227	−4.53%
1990	205	−1.27%
1999	191	−0.78%
2007	208	+1.07%
2012	180	−2.85%
2017	183	+0.33%
2023	188	+0.45%
Source: INSEE

== See also ==
- Communes of the Aube department
