= Précy-Saint-Martin =

Commune in Grand Est, France

- Commune
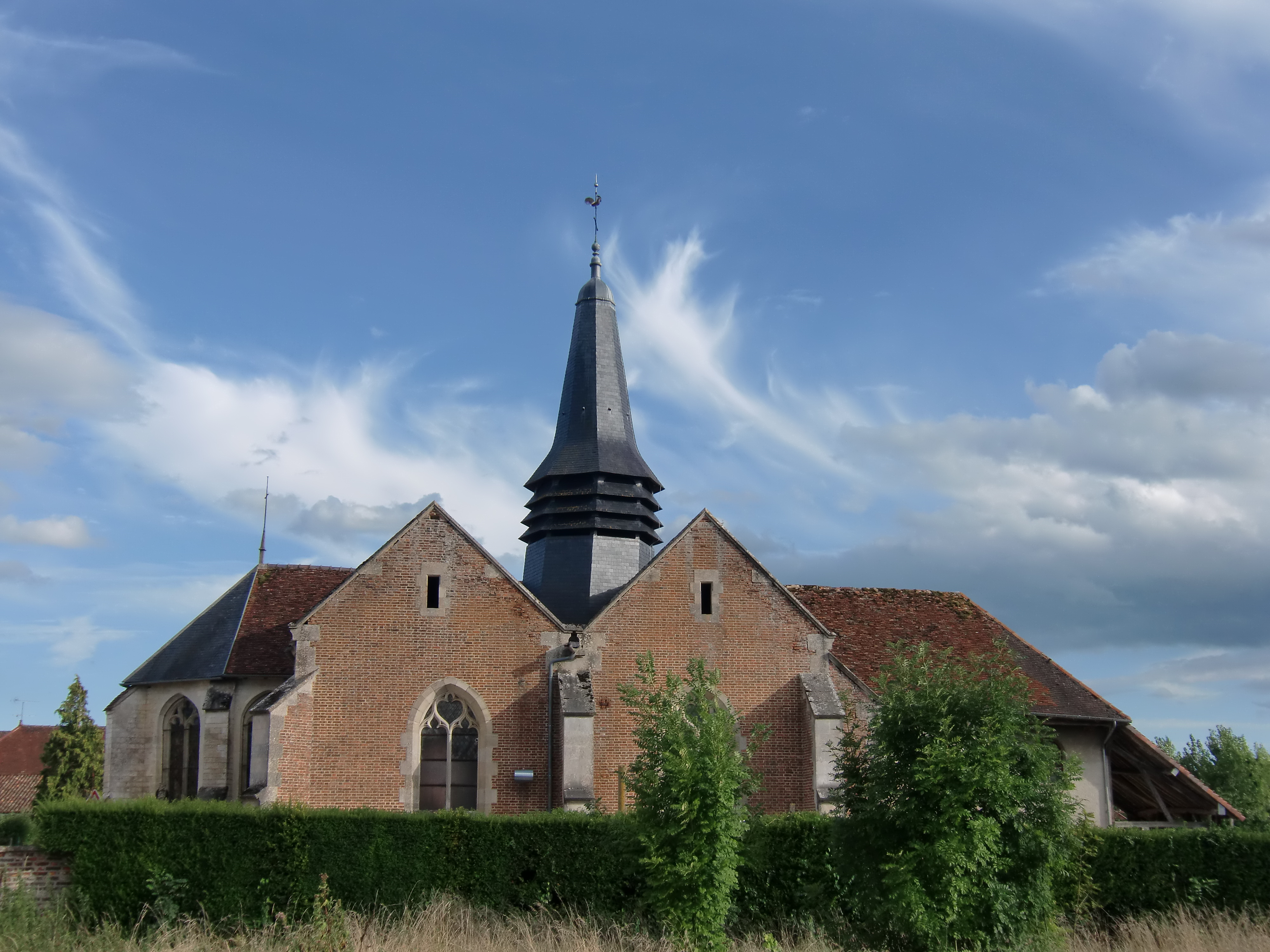
- The church in Précy-Saint-Martin
- Location of Précy-Saint-Martin
- Location within France Location within Grand Est
- Coordinates: 48°25′02″N 4°27′04″E
- Country: France
- Region: Grand Est
- Department: Aube
- Arrondissement: Bar-sur-Aube
- Canton: Brienne-le-Château

Government
  - Mayor (2020–2026): Pascal Bruant
- Area^{1}: 6.57 km^{2} (2.54 sq mi)
- Elevation: 128 m (420 ft)
- Highest elevation: 134 m (440 ft)
- Population (2023): 177
  - Density: 26.9/km^{2} (69.8/sq mi)
- Time zone: UTC+01:00 (CET)
  - Summer (DST): UTC+02:00 (CEST)
- INSEE/Postal code: 10304 /10500
- ^{1} French Land Register data, which excludes lakes, ponds, glaciers > 1 km^{2} (0.386 sq mi or 247 acres) and river estuaries.

Précy-Saint-Martin (French pronunciation: [pʁesi sɛ̃ maʁtɛ̃]) is a commune in the Aube department in north-central France.

== Population ==
Historical population
Year	Pop.	±% p.a.
1968	206	—
1975	200	−0.42%
1982	194	−0.43%
1990	203	+0.57%
1999	223	+1.05%
2007	211	−0.69%
2012	195	−1.56%
2017	187	−0.83%
2023	177	−0.91%
Source: INSEE

== See also ==
- Communes of the Aube department
- Parc naturel régional de la Forêt d'Orient
