= Unienville =

Commune in Grand Est, France

- Commune
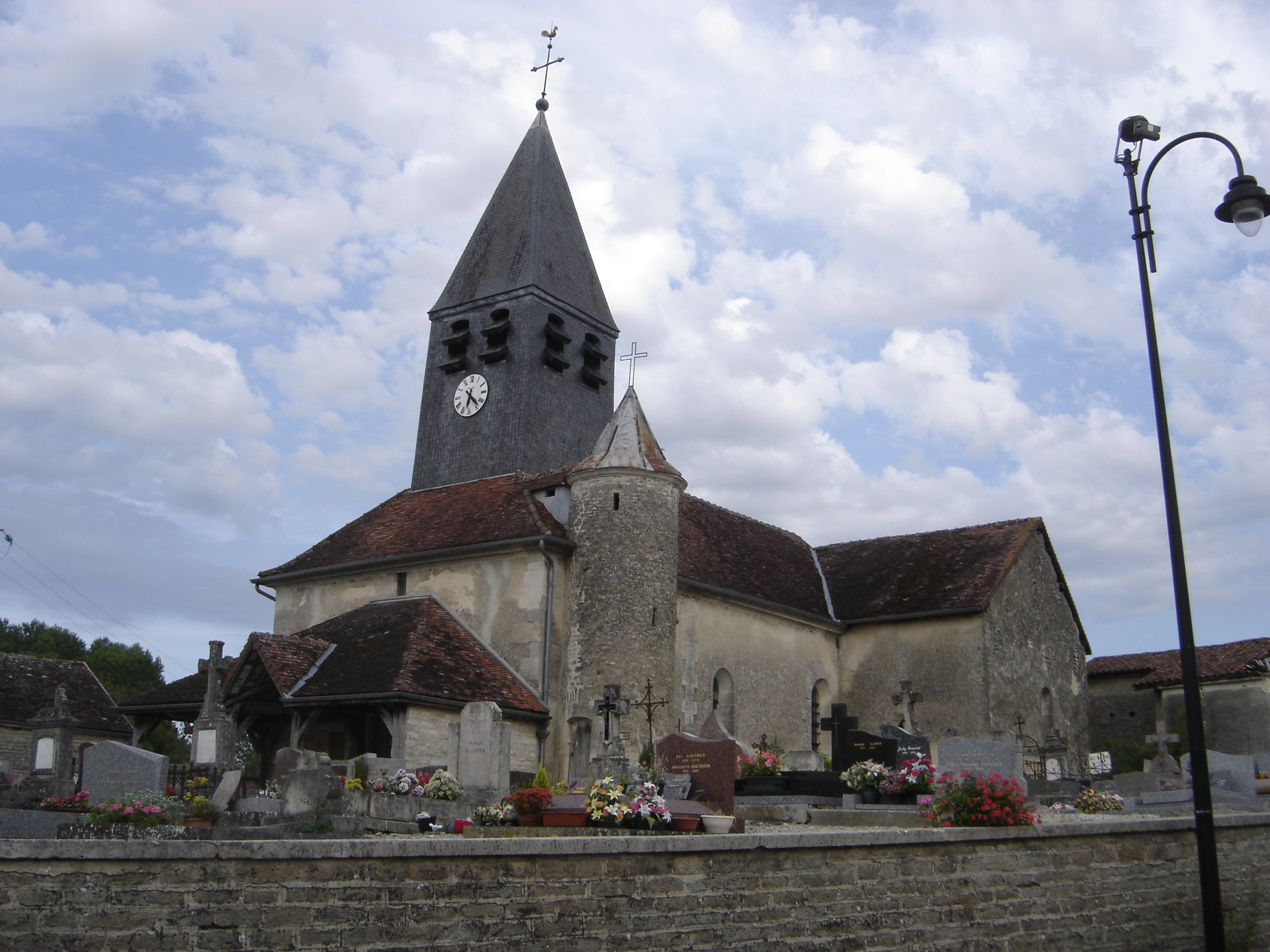
- The church in Unienville

- Coat of arms
- Location of Unienville
- Location within France Location within Grand Est
- Coordinates: 48°19′40″N 4°32′44″E
- Country: France
- Region: Grand Est
- Department: Aube
- Arrondissement: Bar-sur-Aube
- Canton: Brienne-le-Château

Government
  - Mayor (2020–2026): Jean-Michel Chatelain
- Area^{1}: 11.79 km^{2} (4.55 sq mi)
- Elevation: 138 m (453 ft)
- Population (2023): 109
  - Density: 9.25/km^{2} (23.9/sq mi)
- Time zone: UTC+01:00 (CET)
  - Summer (DST): UTC+02:00 (CEST)
- INSEE/Postal code: 10389 /10140
- ^{1} French Land Register data, which excludes lakes, ponds, glaciers > 1 km^{2} (0.386 sq mi or 247 acres) and river estuaries.

Unienville (French pronunciation: [ynjɛ̃vil]) is a commune in the Aube department in north-central France.

== Population ==
Historical population
Year	Pop.	±% p.a.
1968	192	—
1975	167	−1.97%
1982	149	−1.62%
1990	139	−0.86%
1999	116	−1.99%
2007	107	−1.00%
2012	117	+1.80%
2017	125	+1.33%
2023	109	−2.26%
Source: INSEE

== See also ==
- Communes of the Aube department
- Parc naturel régional de la Forêt d'Orient
