= Mathaux =

Commune in Grand Est, France

- Commune
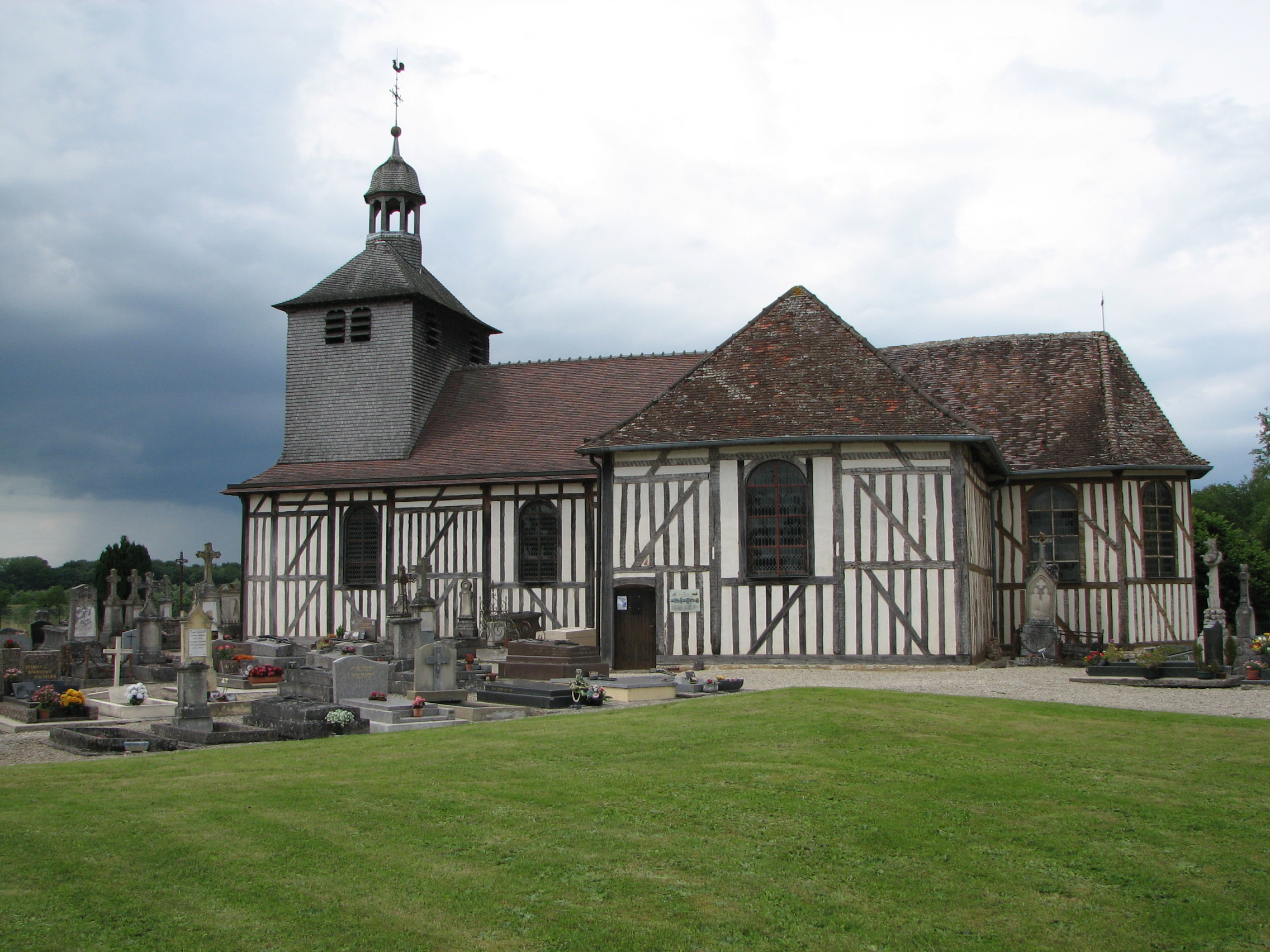
- The church in Mathaux
- Location of Mathaux
- Location within France Location within Grand Est
- Coordinates: 48°22′18″N 4°28′45″E
- Country: France
- Region: Grand Est
- Department: Aube
- Arrondissement: Bar-sur-Aube
- Canton: Brienne-le-Château

Government
  - Mayor (2020–2026): Davy Petit
- Area^{1}: 12.44 km^{2} (4.80 sq mi)
- Elevation: 133 m (436 ft)
- Population (2023): 219
  - Density: 17.6/km^{2} (45.6/sq mi)
- Time zone: UTC+01:00 (CET)
  - Summer (DST): UTC+02:00 (CEST)
- INSEE/Postal code: 10228 /10500
- ^{1} French Land Register data, which excludes lakes, ponds, glaciers > 1 km^{2} (0.386 sq mi or 247 acres) and river estuaries.

Mathaux (French pronunciation: [mato]) is a commune in the Aube department in north-central France.

== Population ==
Historical population
Year	Pop.	±% p.a.
1968	238	—
1975	197	−2.66%
1982	167	−2.33%
1990	186	+1.36%
1999	190	+0.24%
2007	229	+2.36%
2012	219	−0.89%
2017	200	−1.80%
2023	219	+1.52%
Source: INSEE

== Climate ==
Climate data for Mathaux (1991–2020 normals, extremes 1988-present)
Month	Jan	Feb	Mar	Apr	May	Jun	Jul	Aug	Sep	Oct	Nov	Dec	Year
Record high °C (°F)	18.7 (65.7)	21.2 (70.2)	25.5 (77.9)	28.6 (83.5)	32.9 (91.2)	39.5 (103.1)	41.5 (106.7)	40.3 (104.5)	35.4 (95.7)	29.6 (85.3)	23.6 (74.5)	19.0 (66.2)	41.5 (106.7)
Mean daily maximum °C (°F)	6.4 (43.5)	7.8 (46.0)	12.0 (53.6)	15.8 (60.4)	19.6 (67.3)	23.3 (73.9)	26.1 (79.0)	25.8 (78.4)	21.4 (70.5)	16.3 (61.3)	10.3 (50.5)	7.0 (44.6)	16.0 (60.8)
Daily mean °C (°F)	3.8 (38.8)	4.5 (40.1)	7.6 (45.7)	10.5 (50.9)	14.3 (57.7)	17.7 (63.9)	20.1 (68.2)	19.9 (67.8)	16.0 (60.8)	12.2 (54.0)	7.4 (45.3)	4.5 (40.1)	11.5 (52.7)
Mean daily minimum °C (°F)	1.2 (34.2)	1.2 (34.2)	3.2 (37.8)	5.2 (41.4)	9.0 (48.2)	12.1 (53.8)	14.1 (57.4)	14.0 (57.2)	10.7 (51.3)	8.1 (46.6)	4.4 (39.9)	2.0 (35.6)	7.1 (44.8)
Record low °C (°F)	−18.0 (−0.4)	−13.8 (7.2)	−13.2 (8.2)	−4.7 (23.5)	0.0 (32.0)	1.7 (35.1)	4.9 (40.8)	4.4 (39.9)	1.2 (34.2)	−4.0 (24.8)	−11.0 (12.2)	−15.9 (3.4)	−18.0 (−0.4)
Average precipitation mm (inches)	58.0 (2.28)	52.4 (2.06)	53.2 (2.09)	53.5 (2.11)	69.9 (2.75)	57.4 (2.26)	60.8 (2.39)	60.6 (2.39)	58.3 (2.30)	72.4 (2.85)	65.4 (2.57)	72.0 (2.83)	733.9 (28.89)
Average precipitation days (≥ 1.0 mm)	11.3	10.4	10.1	9.0	10.1	9.7	8.3	8.3	8.5	10.3	11.1	12.4	119.4
Mean monthly sunshine hours	68.7	96.5	156.6	207.1	222.9	248.2	251.9	223.1	189.4	127.3	73.8	64.2	1,929.6
Source: Meteociel

== See also ==
- Communes of the Aube department
- Parc naturel régional de la Forêt d'Orient
