= Villeret, Aube =

Commune in Grand Est, France

Villeret
- Commune
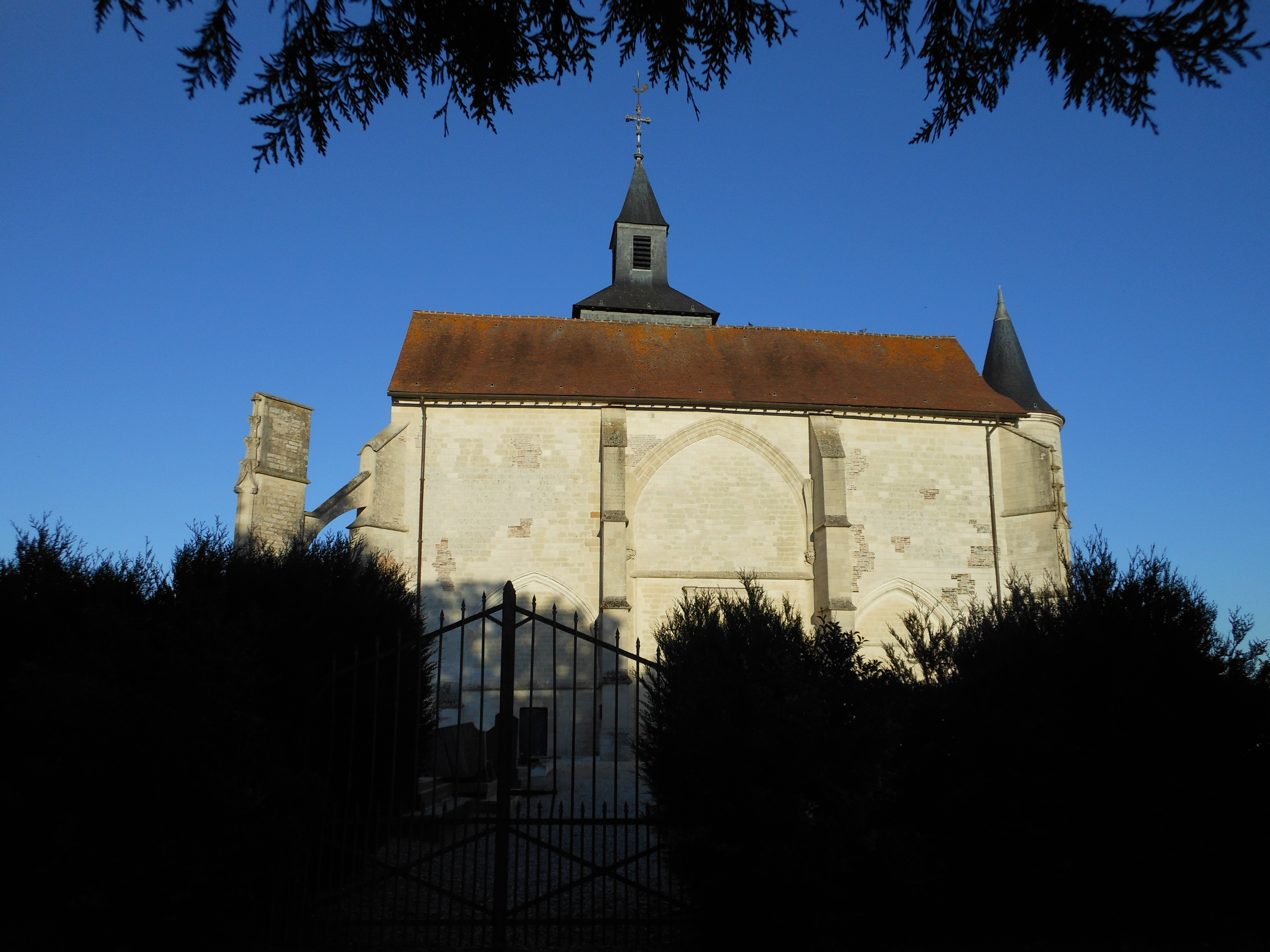
- The church in Villeret
- Location of Villeret
- Location within France Location within Grand Est
- Coordinates: 48°28′40″N 4°35′22″E
- Country: France
- Region: Grand Est
- Department: Aube
- Arrondissement: Bar-sur-Aube
- Canton: Brienne-le-Château

Government
  - Mayor (2020–2026): Jean-Marie Bergeon
- Area^{1}: 3.25 km^{2} (1.25 sq mi)
- Elevation: 125 m (410 ft)
- Population (2023): 66
  - Density: 20/km^{2} (53/sq mi)
- Time zone: UTC+01:00 (CET)
  - Summer (DST): UTC+02:00 (CEST)
- INSEE/Postal code: 10424 /10330
- ^{1} French Land Register data, which excludes lakes, ponds, glaciers > 1 km^{2} (0.386 sq mi or 247 acres) and river estuaries.

Villeret (French pronunciation: [vilʁɛ]) is a commune in the Aube department in north-central France.

== Population ==
Historical population
Year	Pop.	±% p.a.
1968	68	—
1975	80	+2.35%
1982	79	−0.18%
1990	60	−3.38%
1999	57	−0.57%
2007	72	+2.96%
2012	66	−1.73%
2017	63	−0.93%
2023	66	+0.78%
Source: INSEE

== See also ==
- Communes of the Aube department
