= Rances, Aube =

Commune in Grand Est, France

Rances
- Commune
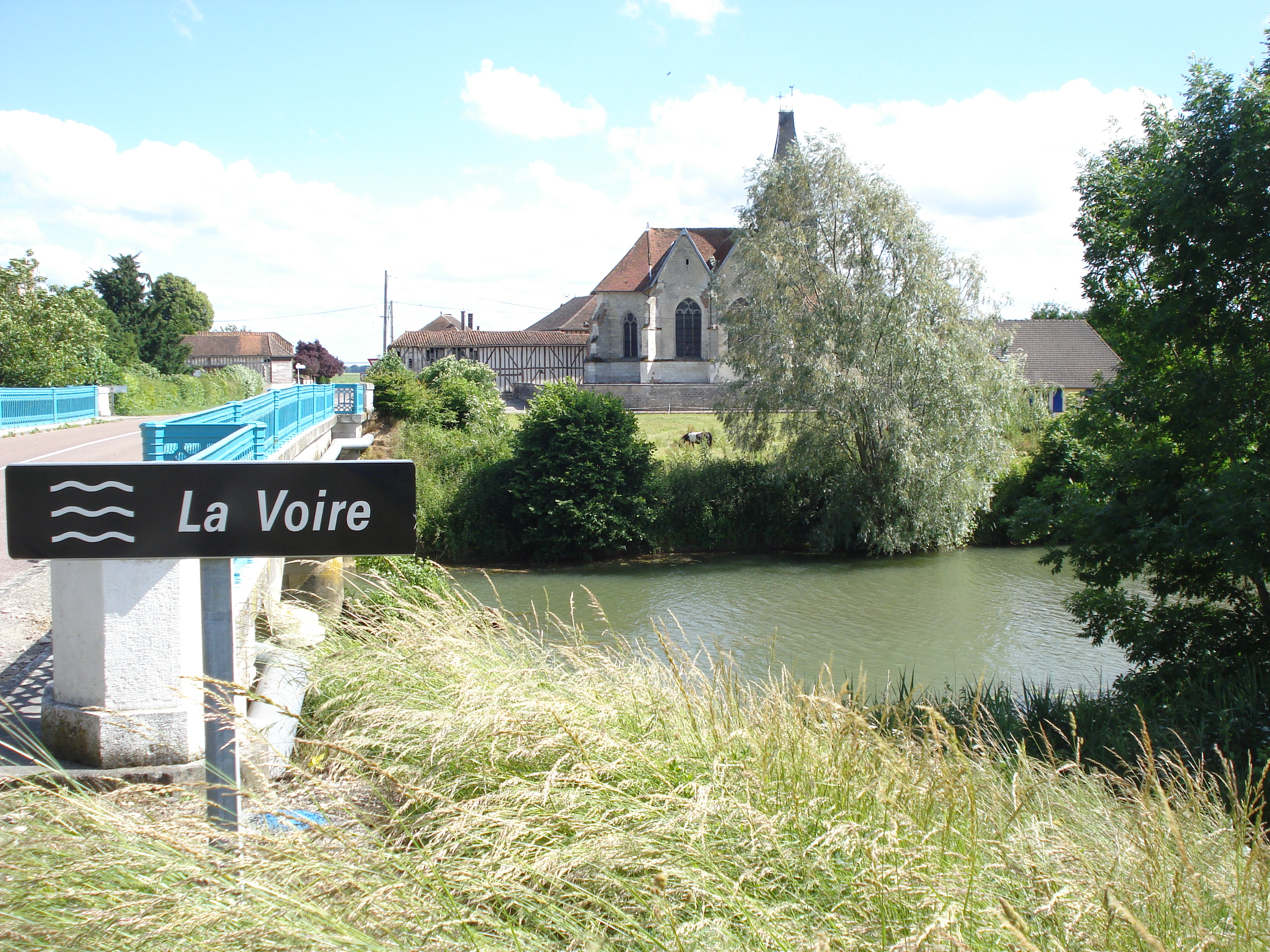
- The Voire bridge in Rances
- Location of Rances
- Location within France Location within Grand Est
- Coordinates: 48°28′02″N 4°32′47″E
- Country: France
- Region: Grand Est
- Department: Aube
- Arrondissement: Bar-sur-Aube
- Canton: Brienne-le-Château

Government
  - Mayor (2020–2026): Gérard Dorez
- Area^{1}: 3.81 km^{2} (1.47 sq mi)
- Elevation: 123 m (404 ft)
- Population (2023): 39
  - Density: 10/km^{2} (27/sq mi)
- Time zone: UTC+01:00 (CET)
  - Summer (DST): UTC+02:00 (CEST)
- INSEE/Postal code: 10315 /10500
- ^{1} French Land Register data, which excludes lakes, ponds, glaciers > 1 km^{2} (0.386 sq mi or 247 acres) and river estuaries.

Rances (French pronunciation: [ʁɑ̃s]) is a commune in the Aube department in north-central France.

== Population ==
Historical population
Year	Pop.	±% p.a.
1968	81	—
1975	61	−3.97%
1982	46	−3.95%
1990	43	−0.84%
1999	40	−0.80%
2007	45	+1.48%
2012	40	−2.33%
2017	44	+1.92%
2023	39	−1.99%
Source: INSEE

== See also ==
- Communes of the Aube department
