= Précy-Notre-Dame =

Commune in Grand Est, France

- Commune
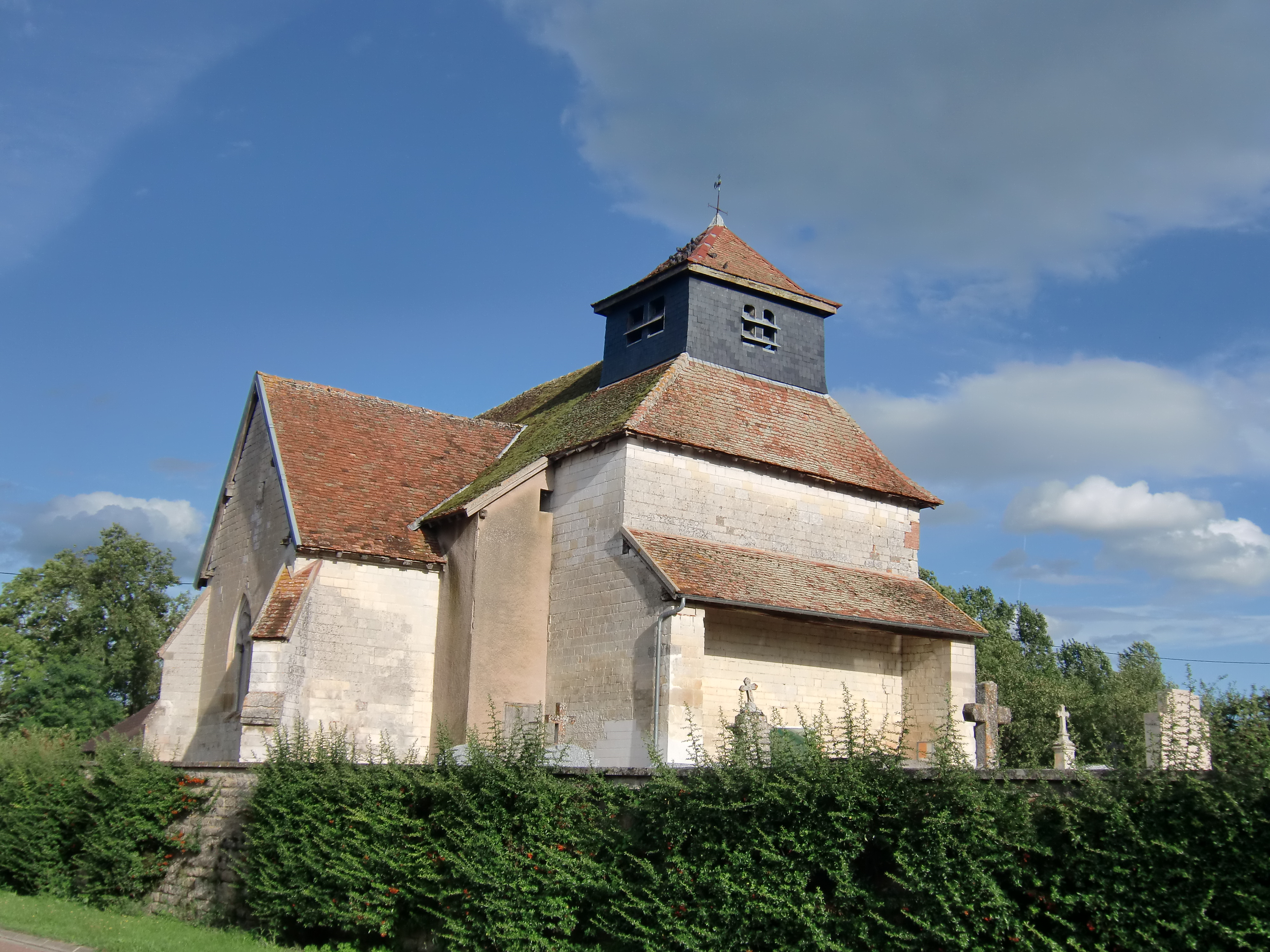
- The church in Précy-Notre-Dame

- Coat of arms
- Location of Précy-Notre-Dame
- Location within France Location within Grand Est
- Coordinates: 48°24′43″N 4°26′17″E
- Country: France
- Region: Grand Est
- Department: Aube
- Arrondissement: Bar-sur-Aube
- Canton: Brienne-le-Château

Government
  - Mayor (2020–2026): Alain Masson
- Area^{1}: 4.53 km^{2} (1.75 sq mi)
- Elevation: 115 m (377 ft)
- Population (2023): 66
  - Density: 15/km^{2} (38/sq mi)
- Time zone: UTC+01:00 (CET)
  - Summer (DST): UTC+02:00 (CEST)
- INSEE/Postal code: 10303 /10500
- ^{1} French Land Register data, which excludes lakes, ponds, glaciers > 1 km^{2} (0.386 sq mi or 247 acres) and river estuaries.

Précy-Notre-Dame (French pronunciation: [pʁesi nɔtʁ dam]) is a commune in the Aube department in north-central France.

== Population ==
Historical population
Year	Pop.	±% p.a.
1968	91	—
1975	91	+0.00%
1982	77	−2.36%
1990	76	−0.16%
1999	68	−1.23%
2007	79	+1.89%
2012	85	+1.47%
2017	82	−0.72%
2023	66	−3.55%
Source: INSEE

== See also ==
- Communes of the Aube department
- Parc naturel régional de la Forêt d'Orient
