= Rosnay-l'Hôpital =

Commune in Grand Est, France

- Commune
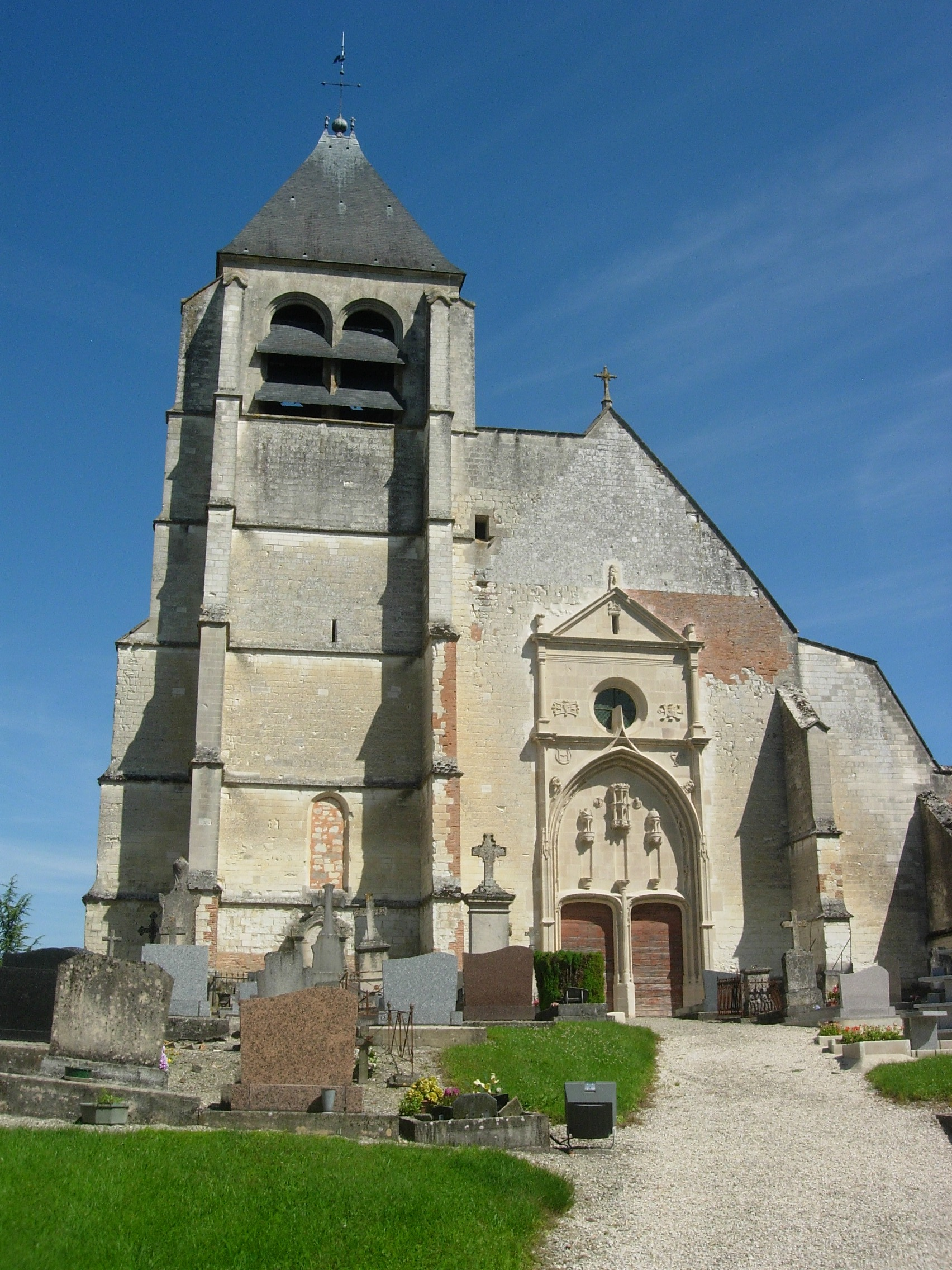
- The church in Rosnay-l'Hôpital

- Coat of arms
- Location of Rosnay-l'Hôpital
- Location within France Location within Grand Est
- Coordinates: 48°27′37″N 4°30′16″E
- Country: France
- Region: Grand Est
- Department: Aube
- Arrondissement: Bar-sur-Aube
- Canton: Brienne-le-Château

Government
  - Mayor (2020–2026): Brice Martin
- Area^{1}: 12.47 km^{2} (4.81 sq mi)
- Elevation: 118 m (387 ft)
- Population (2023): 156
  - Density: 12.5/km^{2} (32.4/sq mi)
- Time zone: UTC+01:00 (CET)
  - Summer (DST): UTC+02:00 (CEST)
- INSEE/Postal code: 10326 /10500
- ^{1} French Land Register data, which excludes lakes, ponds, glaciers > 1 km^{2} (0.386 sq mi or 247 acres) and river estuaries.

Rosnay-l'Hôpital (French pronunciation: [ʁonɛ lopital]) is a commune in the Aube department in north-central France.

== Population ==
Historical population
Year	Pop.	±% p.a.
1968	247	—
1975	242	−0.29%
1982	227	−0.91%
1990	215	−0.68%
1999	215	+0.00%
2007	215	+0.00%
2012	224	+0.82%
2017	181	−4.17%
2023	156	−2.45%
Source: INSEE

== See also ==
- Communes of the Aube department
- Parc naturel régional de la Forêt d'Orient
