= Brienne-le-Château =

Commune in Grand Est, France

- Commune
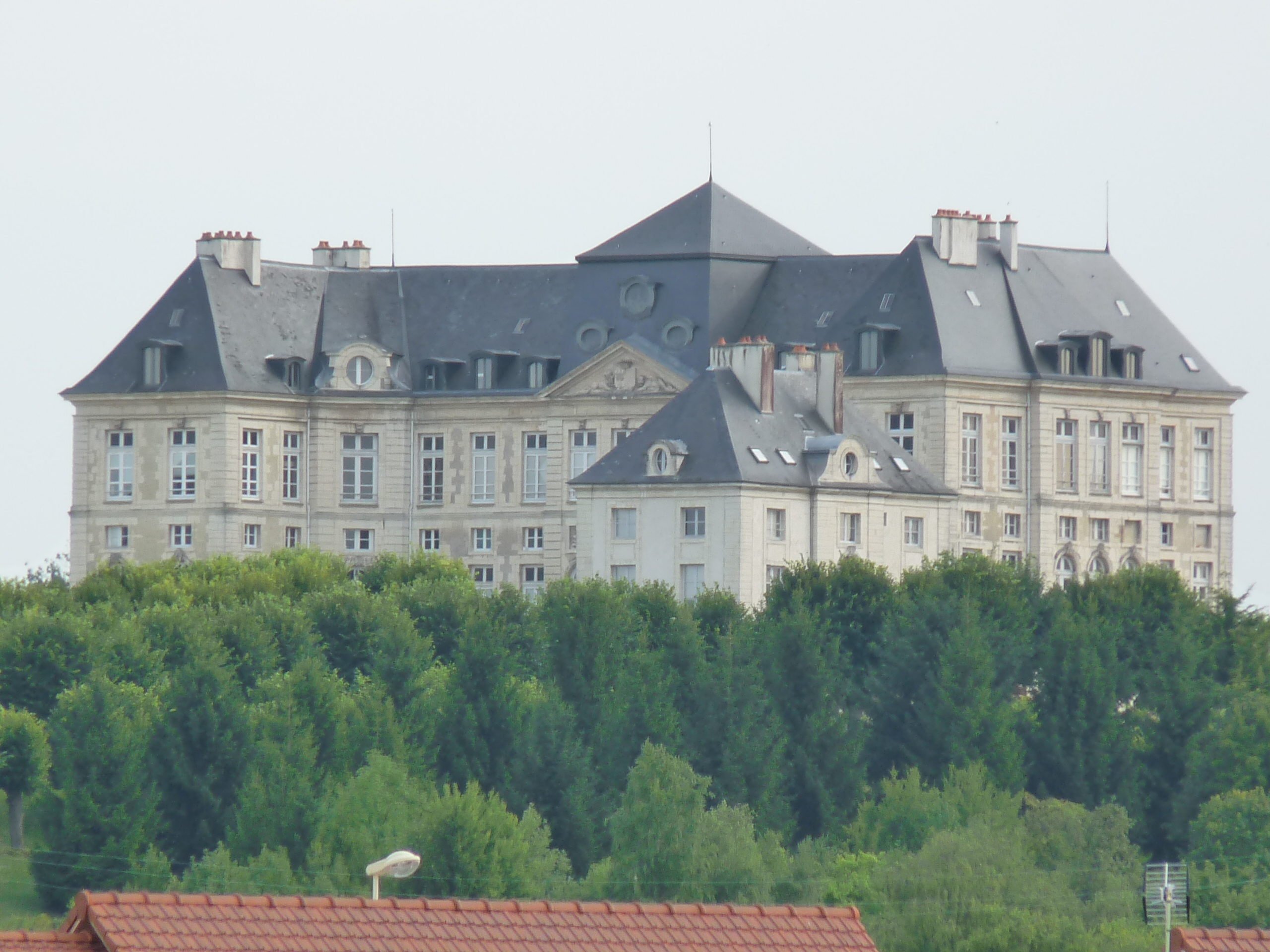
- The chateau in Brienne-le-Château

- Coat of arms
- Location of Brienne-le-Château
- Location within France Location within Grand Est
- Coordinates: 48°23′31″N 4°31′35″E
- Country: France
- Region: Grand Est
- Department: Aube
- Arrondissement: Bar-sur-Aube
- Canton: Brienne-le-Château

Government
  - Mayor (2026–32): Brice Breton
- Area^{1}: 21.56 km^{2} (8.32 sq mi)
- Elevation: 126 m (413 ft)
- Highest elevation: 167 m (548 ft)
- Lowest elevation: 112 m (367 ft)
- Population (2023): 2,672
  - Density: 123.9/km^{2} (321.0/sq mi)
- Time zone: UTC+01:00 (CET)
  - Summer (DST): UTC+02:00 (CEST)
- INSEE/Postal code: 10064 /10500
- ^{1} French Land Register data, which excludes lakes, ponds, glaciers > 1 km^{2} (0.386 sq mi or 247 acres) and river estuaries.

Brienne-le-Château (French pronunciation: [bʁijɛn lə ʃɑto]) is a commune in the Aube department in north-central France. It is located 1 mile (2 km) from the right bank of the river Aube and 26 miles northeast of Troyes.

== History ==
It was the centre of the medieval County of Brienne, whose lords, first counts and eventually dukes, had a claim to the Kingdom of Jerusalem. John of Brienne ( c. 1170 – 27 March 1237), also known as John I, was King of Jerusalem from 1210 to 1225 (and Latin Emperor of Constantinople from 1229 to 1237). He was the youngest son of Erard II of Brienne, a wealthy nobleman in Champagne.

The École de Brienne was established in 1730 and remained active until it was closed in 1790. It is currently a museum. Notable students included:

- Napoleon Bonaparte (1779 to 1784) (French Emperor)
- Louis-Nicolas Davout (French Marshal)
- Antoine Le Picard de Phélippeaux (French emigre soldier)

In 1814, it was the site of the Battle of Brienne, when the Sixth Coalition invaded France.

== Population ==
Historical population

Year	Pop.	±% p.a.
1793	1,968	—
1800	1,967	−0.01%
1806	1,859	−0.94%
1821	1,747	−0.41%
1831	1,920	+0.95%
1836	2,002	+0.84%
1841	1,830	−1.78%
1846	1,886	+0.60%
1851	1,880	−0.06%
1856	2,013	+1.38%
1861	2,057	+0.43%
1866	2,078	+0.20%
1872	1,886	−1.60%
1876	1,889	+0.04%
1881	1,918	+0.31%
1886	1,872	−0.48%
1891	1,732	−1.54%
1896	1,701	−0.36%
1901	1,753	+0.60%

Year	Pop.	±% p.a.
1906	1,872	+1.32%
1911	1,815	−0.62%
1921	1,708	−0.61%
1926	1,932	+2.50%
1931	2,218	+2.80%
1936	2,232	+0.13%
1946	1,972	−1.23%
1954	2,177	+1.24%
1962	3,534	+6.24%
1968	3,939	+1.82%
1975	4,033	+0.34%
1982	4,060	+0.10%
1990	3,752	−0.98%
1999	3,336	−1.30%
2007	3,175	−0.62%
2012	2,987	−1.21%
2017	2,826	−1.10%
2023	2,672	−0.93%

Source: EHESS and INSEE (1968-2023)

== See also ==
- Communes of the Aube department
- Parc naturel régional de la Forêt d'Orient
- Lakes Amance and du Temple
