= Bailly-le-Franc =

Commune in Grand Est, France

- Commune
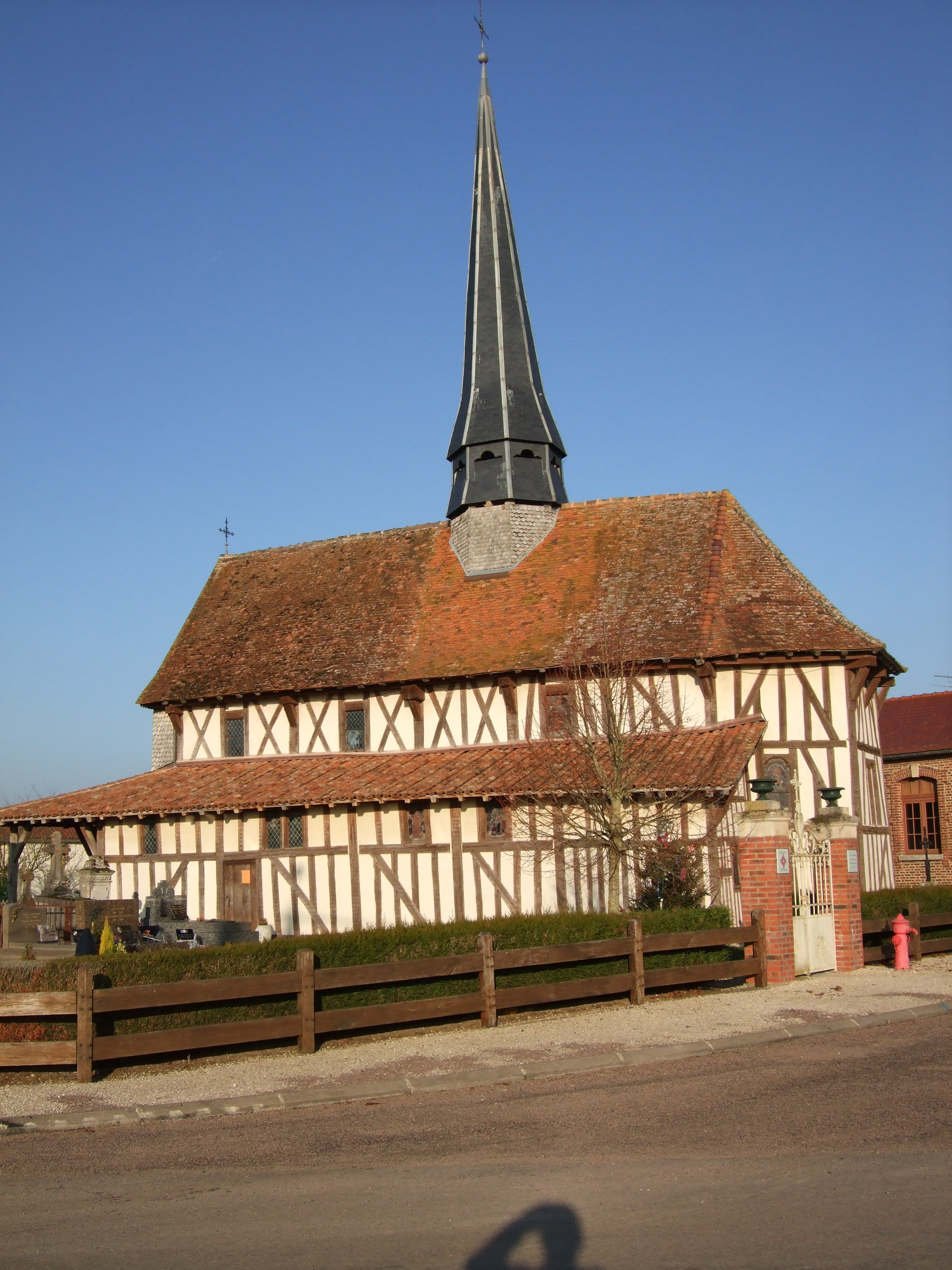
- The church in Bailly-le-Franc

- Coat of arms
- Location of Bailly-le-Franc
- Location within France Location within Grand Est
- Coordinates: 48°31′26″N 4°39′18″E
- Country: France
- Region: Grand Est
- Department: Aube
- Arrondissement: Bar-sur-Aube
- Canton: Brienne-le-Château

Government
  - Mayor (2020–2026): Michel Bourgoin
- Area^{1}: 6 km^{2} (2.3 sq mi)
- Elevation: 125 m (410 ft)
- Highest elevation: 135 m (443 ft)
- Lowest elevation: 117 m (384 ft)
- Population (2023): 34
  - Density: 5.7/km^{2} (15/sq mi)
- Time zone: UTC+01:00 (CET)
  - Summer (DST): UTC+02:00 (CEST)
- INSEE/Postal code: 10026 /10330
- ^{1} French Land Register data, which excludes lakes, ponds, glaciers > 1 km^{2} (0.386 sq mi or 247 acres) and river estuaries.

Bailly-le-Franc (French pronunciation: [baji lə fʁɑ̃]) is a commune in the Aube department in the Grand Est region of north-central France.

== Geography ==
Bailly-le-Franc is located some 20 km south-west of Saint-Dizier and 15 km north-east of Brienne-le-Château. The northern border of the commune is the departmental border between Aube and Marne while the eastern border is the departmental border between Aube and Haute-Marne. Access to the commune is by the D127 road from Margerie-Hancourt in the west which passes through the centre of the commune and continues south-east, changing to the D13 at the commune border, to Droyes. The D655 comes from Outines in the north, changing to the D56 at the communal border and passing through the commune then continuing south-west to Chavanges. The south of the commune is forested with the rest farmland.

The Ruisseau de Chevry flows out of the Étang de Bailly in the west of the commune and passes through the commune towards the east before turning south to form the eastern border of the commune and the department and continuing through the Étang de la Horre to join the Voire. The Ruisseau du Pré Darras forms the northern border of the commune and the department as it flows east to join the Droye.

== Administration ==
List of Successive Mayors

From	To	Name
	1857	Demy
2001	2026	Michel Bourgoin

== Demography ==
Historical population

Year	Pop.	±% p.a.
1793	140	—
1821	130	−0.26%
1846	172	+1.13%
1872	172	+0.00%
1901	155	−0.36%
1926	108	−1.43%
1946	89	−0.96%
1962	70	−1.49%
1968	65	−1.23%

Year	Pop.	±% p.a.
1975	44	−5.42%
1982	39	−1.71%
1990	32	−2.44%
1999	35	+1.00%
2007	31	−1.51%
2012	35	+2.46%
2017	37	+1.12%
2023	34	−1.40%

Source: EHESS and INSEE

== Sites and monuments ==
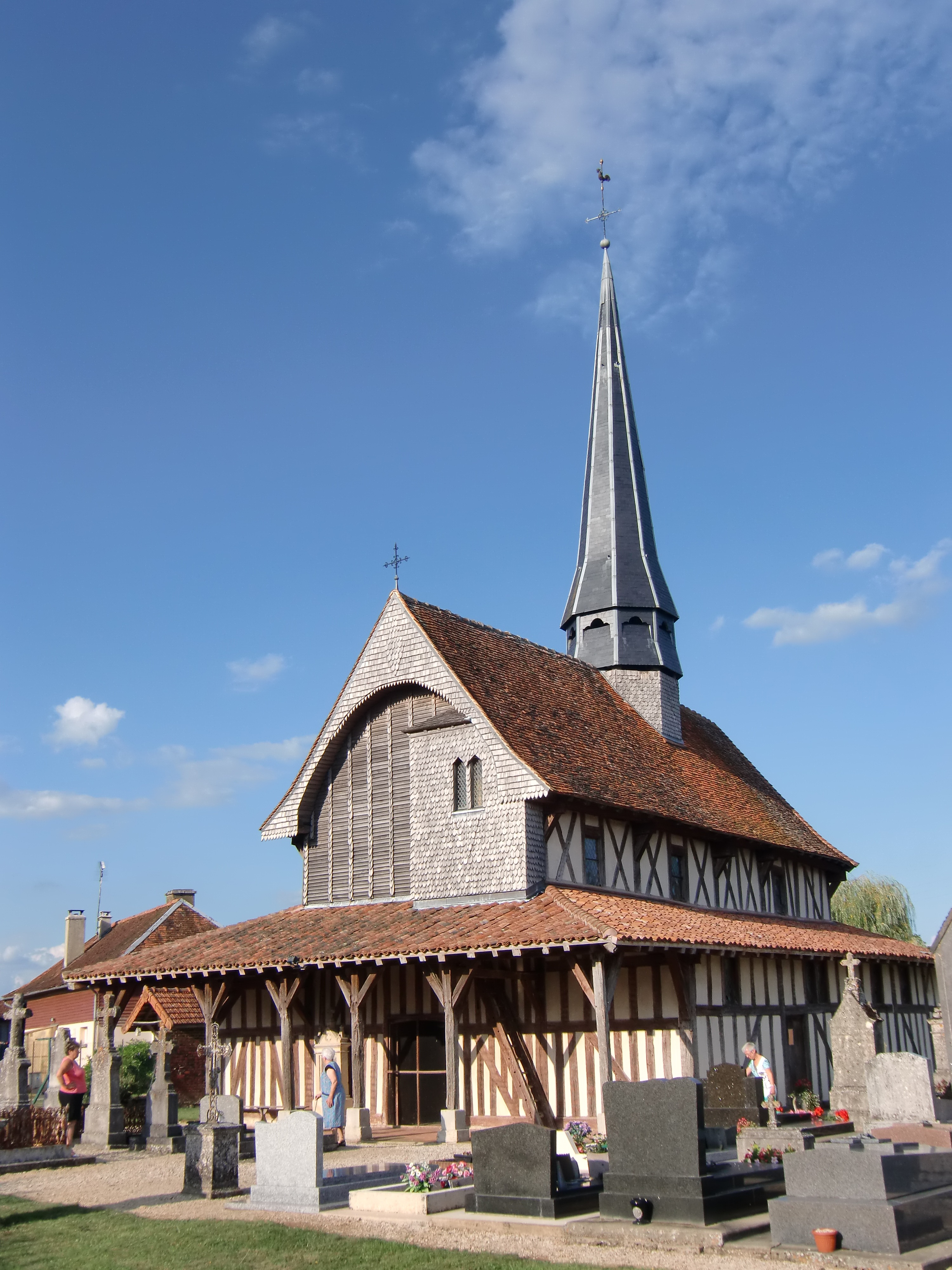
The Church of the Exaltation of Saint Croix

The Church of the Exaltation of Saint Croix (16th century) is registered as an historical monument. The church contains many items that are registered as historical objects:

- A Chair (18th century)
- A Statue: Saint Helen (16th century)
- A Stained glass window: Virgin of Pity (16th century)
- The Retable in the main altar (18th century)
- A Ciborium (18th century)
- A Paten (19th century)
- A Chalice (18th century)
- An Altar Painting: Saint Helen digging up the Cross on Golgotha (19th century)
- A Processional Staff: The Virgin (19th century)
- A Processional Staff: Sacred Heart (19th century)
- An Altar Painting: The Virgin trampling original sin underfoot (19th century)
- A Statue: Christ on the Cross (18th century)
- 2 Tapestry Medallions: Angels and Saint Paul adoring the Blessed Sacrament (18th century)
- A Baptismal font (12th century)
- The Furniture in the Church
- An Altar Painting: Constantine prostrates himself before the Cross (18th century)

== See also ==
- Communes of the Aube department
