= Aulnay, Aube =

Commune in Grand Est, France

Aulnay
- Commune
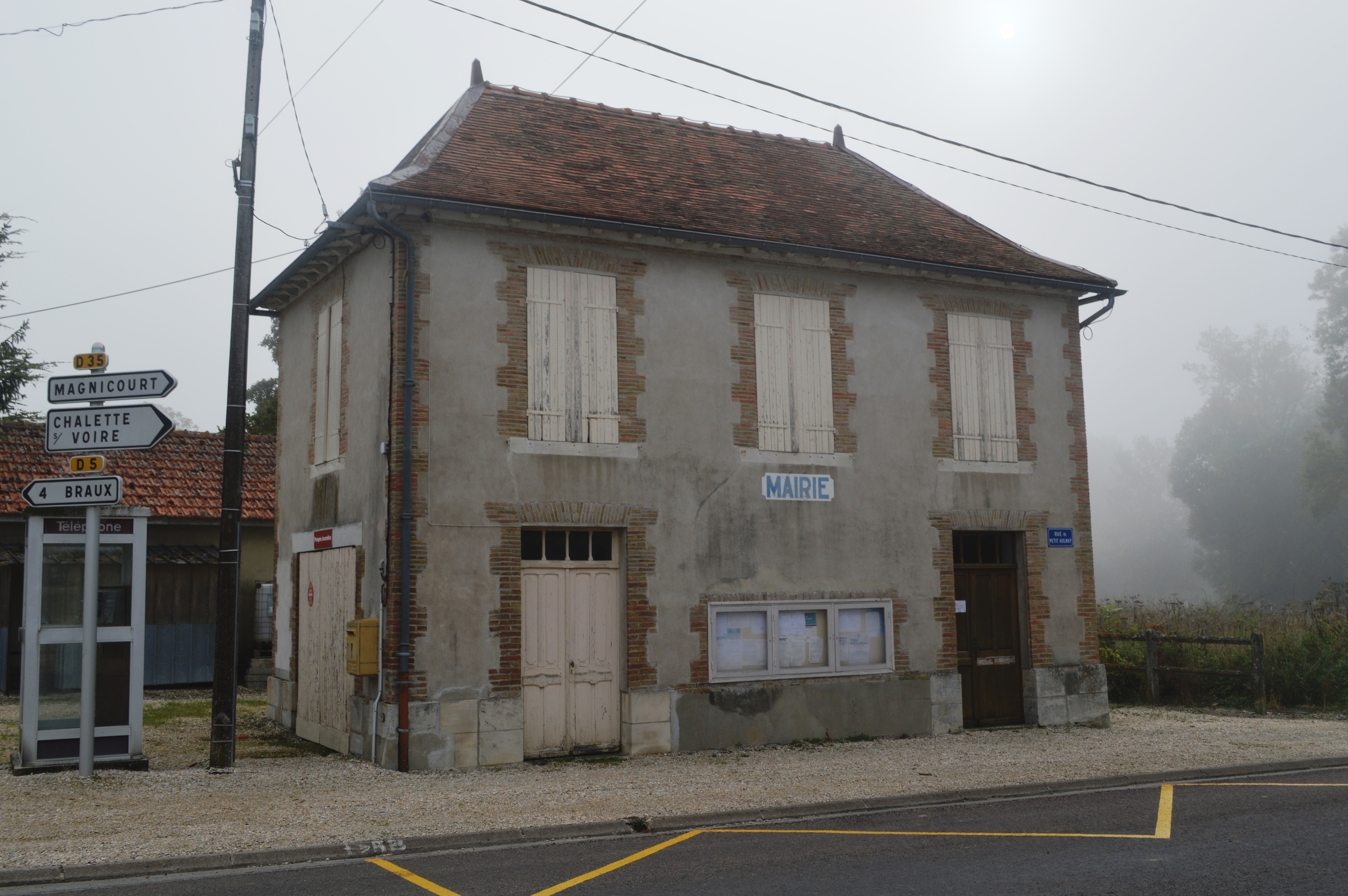
- The Town Hall
- Location of Aulnay
- Location within France Location within Grand Est
- Coordinates: 48°28′24″N 4°24′23″E
- Country: France
- Region: Grand Est
- Department: Aube
- Arrondissement: Bar-sur-Aube
- Canton: Brienne-le-Château
- Intercommunality: CC Lacs Champagne

Government
  - Mayor (2020–2026): Jacky Cartier
- Area^{1}: 10.44 km^{2} (4.03 sq mi)
- Elevation: 113 m (371 ft)
- Population (2023): 108
  - Density: 10.3/km^{2} (26.8/sq mi)
- Time zone: UTC+01:00 (CET)
  - Summer (DST): UTC+02:00 (CEST)
- INSEE/Postal code: 10017 /10240
- ^{1} French Land Register data, which excludes lakes, ponds, glaciers > 1 km^{2} (0.386 sq mi or 247 acres) and river estuaries.

Aulnay (French pronunciation: [onɛ], pronounced ɔnɛ, the "l" is mute) is a commune in the Aube department in the Grand Est region of north-central France.

== Geography ==
Aulnay is located some 28 km east by south-east of Arcis-sur-Aube, 16 km north-west of Brienne-le-Château, and 50 km west by south-west of Saint-Dizier. Access to the commune is by the D 35 road from Jasseines in the north which passes through the west of the commune and the village before it continues south to Chalette-sur-Voire. The D 5 road comes from Brillecourt in the west and passes through the village before continuing east to Braux. South of the village is the hamlet of Petit Aulnay. Apart from a belt of trees along the river the commune is entirely farmland.

The Ravet river flows through the commune from east to west forming part of the south-facing border in both the east and west of the commune before continuing west to join the Aube at Brillecourt.

== Administration ==
List of Successive Mayors

From	To	Name
	1857	Bonnot
2001	2026	Jacky Cartier

== Demography ==
The inhabitants of the commune are known as Aulnaysiens in French.

Historical population

Year	Pop.	±% p.a.
1793	141	—
1821	179	+0.86%
1846	201	+0.46%
1872	211	+0.19%
1901	146	−1.26%
1926	165	+0.49%
1946	136	−0.96%
1962	131	−0.23%
1968	117	−1.87%

Year	Pop.	±% p.a.
1975	109	−1.01%
1982	105	−0.53%
1990	106	+0.12%
1999	118	+1.20%
2007	112	−0.65%
2012	135	+3.81%
2017	129	−0.91%
2023	108	−2.92%

Source: EHESS and INSEE

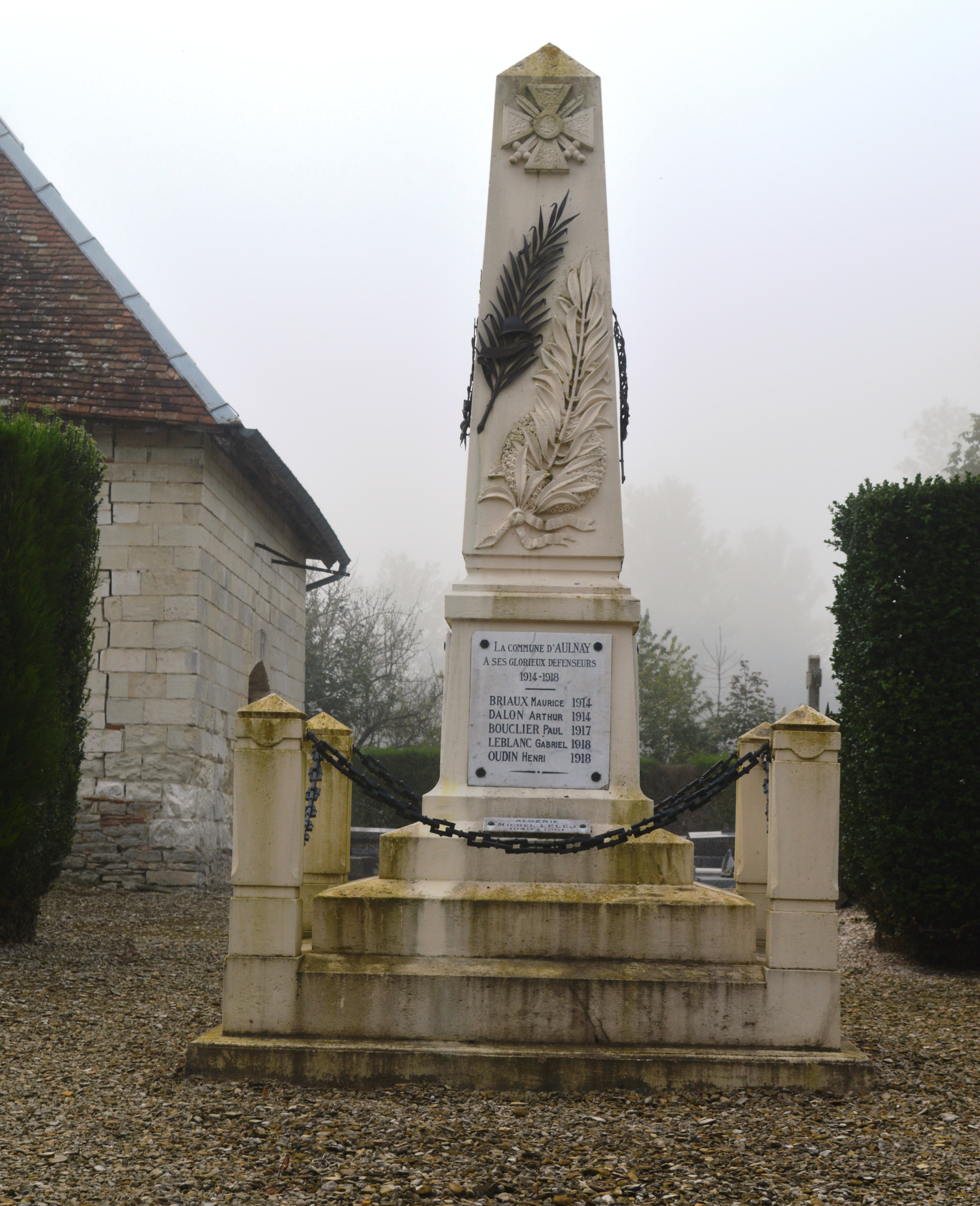
Aulnay War Memorial

== Culture and heritage ==
=== Civil heritage ===
The town hall contains 4 Stained glass windows (16th century) which are registered as an historical object.

=== Religious heritage ===
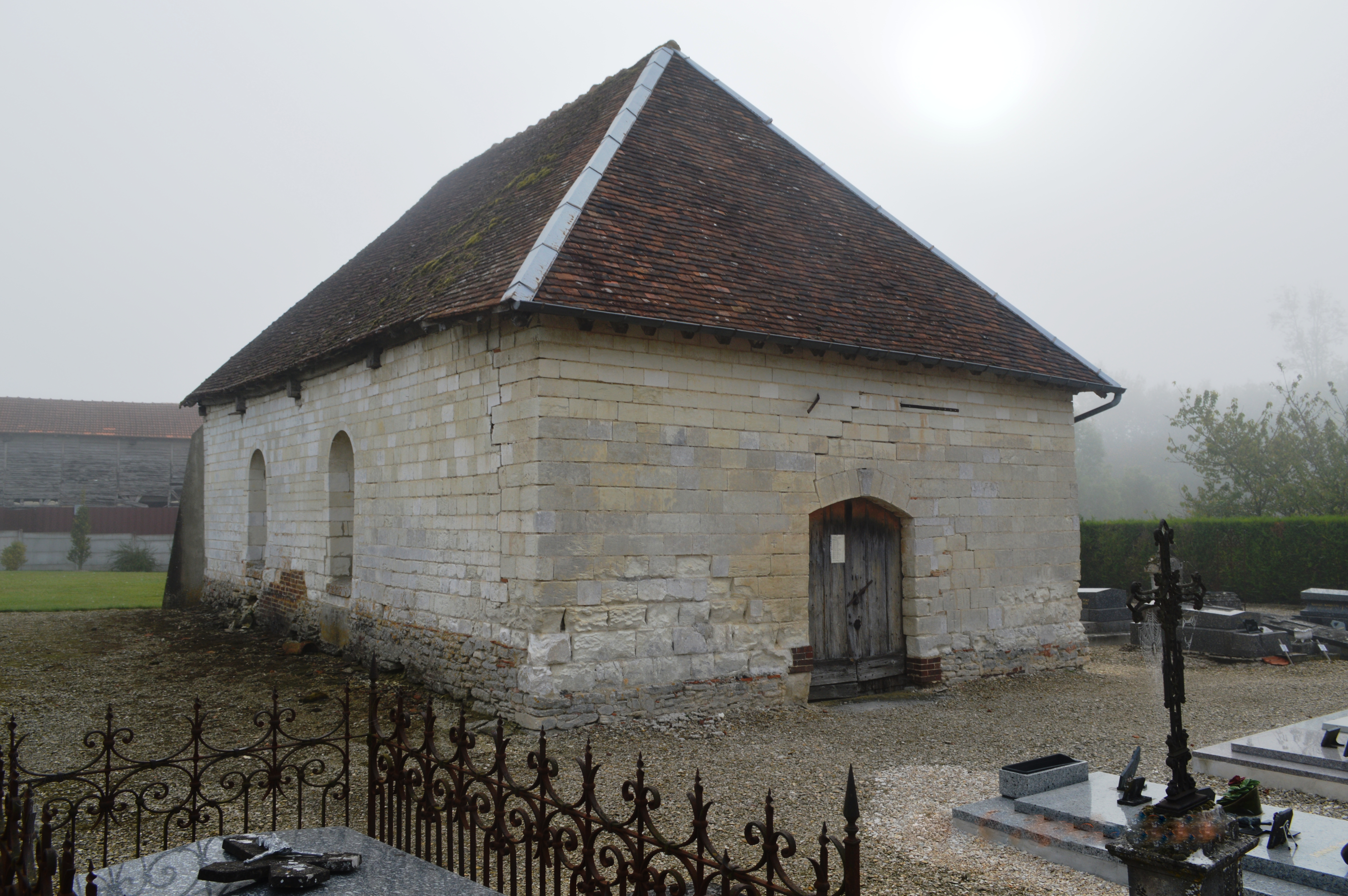
The rebuilt Church of Saint-Rémy

The Church of Saint-Rémy was built in the 16th century but collapsed in recent years. There are only the remains of the Romansesque Nave which was rebuilt in the 18th century.

The Parish Church contains many items that are registered as historical objects:

- A Tombstone (16th century) (destroyed)
- An Eagle Lectern (19th century)
- A Statue: Christ on the Cross (16th century)
- A Tabernacle (18th century)
- A Statue: Saint-Rémy (16th century)
- A Statue: Sainte-Savine (16th century)
- A Statuette: Saint-Jean-Baptiste (16th century) (disappeared)
- A Statue: Saint-Roch (16th century)
- A Statuette: Saint-Antoine (16th century)
- A Statue: Virgin and Child (16th century)
- An Inscription (1681) (destroyed)
- An Altar (19th century)
- A Stoup (17th century)
- The Furniture in the Church

== See also ==
- Communes of the Aube department
