= Balignicourt =

Commune in Grand Est, France

- Commune
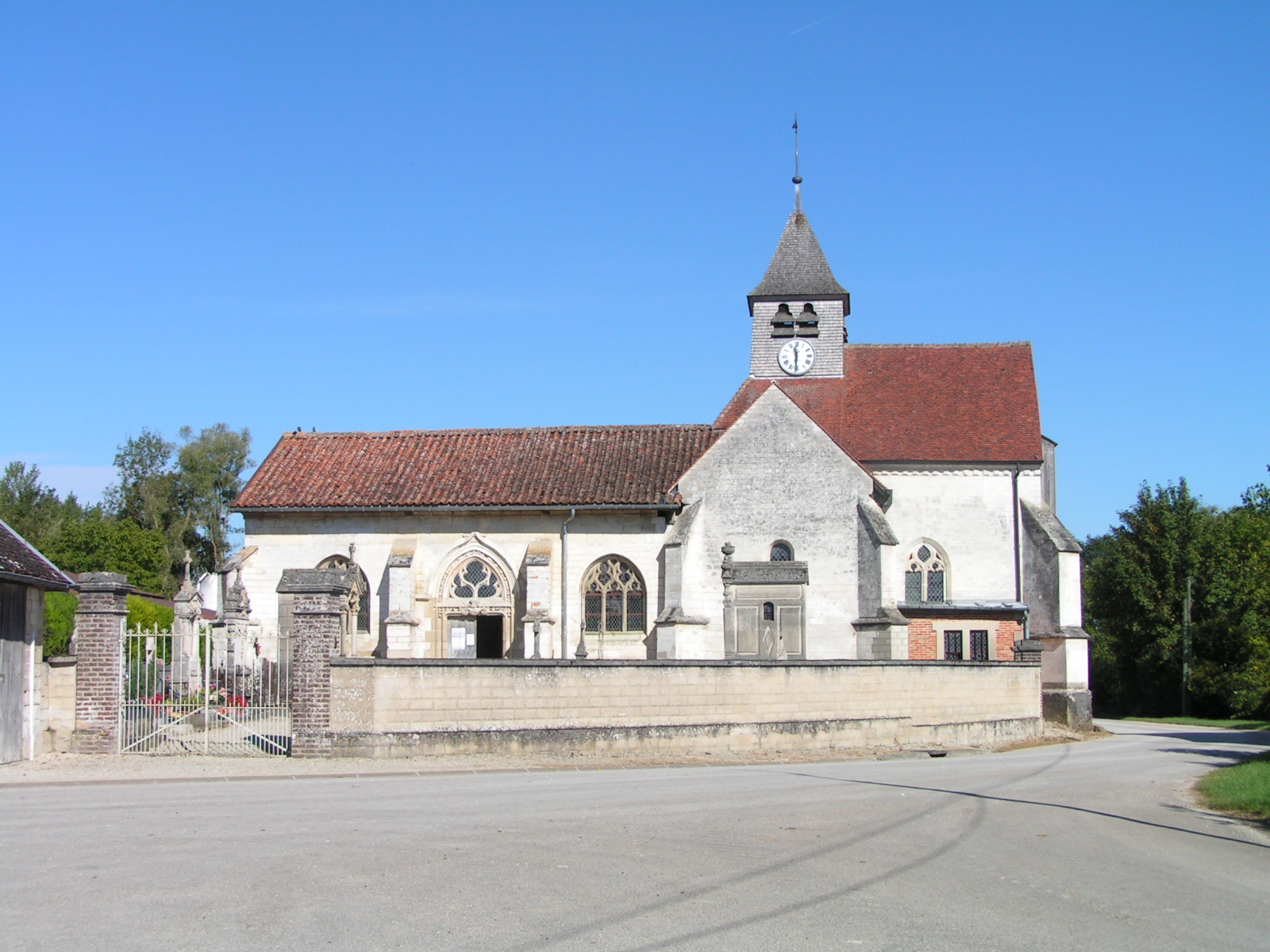
- Balignicourt Church
- Location of Balignicourt
- Location within France Location within Grand Est
- Coordinates: 48°31′00″N 4°27′42″E
- Country: France
- Region: Grand Est
- Department: Aube
- Arrondissement: Bar-sur-Aube
- Canton: Brienne-le-Château

Government
  - Mayor (2020–2026): Pascal Joanot
- Area^{1}: 13.06 km^{2} (5.04 sq mi)
- Elevation: 111 m (364 ft)
- Highest elevation: 166 m (545 ft)
- Lowest elevation: 109 m (358 ft)
- Population (2023): 56
  - Density: 4.3/km^{2} (11/sq mi)
- Time zone: UTC+01:00 (CET)
  - Summer (DST): UTC+02:00 (CEST)
- INSEE/Postal code: 10027 /10330
- ^{1} French Land Register data, which excludes lakes, ponds, glaciers > 1 km^{2} (0.386 sq mi or 247 acres) and river estuaries.

Balignicourt (French pronunciation: [baliɲikuʁ]) is a commune in the Aube department in the Grand Est region of north-central France.

== Geography ==
Balignicourt is located some 18 km north-west of Brienne-le-Château and 25 km south by south-west of Vitry-le-François. The northern border of the commune is the departmental boundary between Aube and Marne. Access to the commune is by the D56 from Jasseines in the west which passes through the south of the commune and the village before continuing east to Chavanges. The D156 goes north-east from the village to Margerie-Hancourt, changing to the D355 at the departmental border. Apart from the village there are the hamlets of Les Ormées, Vendeuil and Les Vieilles-Vignes. The commune is entirely farmland except for a belt of forest along the river.

The Meldançon river flows through the commune from east to west and continues west to join the Aube near Morembert.

== Administration ==
List of Successive Mayors

From	To	Name
	1857	Jules Royer
2001	2008	Marcel Diart
2008	2014	Henri Paul Joanot
2014	2026	Pascal Joanot

== Demography ==
Historical population

Year	Pop.	±% p.a.
1793	209	—
1821	208	−0.02%
1846	204	−0.08%
1872	215	+0.20%
1901	167	−0.87%
1926	164	−0.07%
1946	190	+0.74%
1962	148	−1.55%
1968	153	+0.56%

Year	Pop.	±% p.a.
1975	147	−0.57%
1982	111	−3.93%
1990	93	−2.19%
1999	94	+0.12%
2007	83	−1.54%
2012	72	−2.80%
2017	61	−3.26%
2023	56	−1.42%

Source: EHESS and INSEE

== Culture and heritage ==
=== Religious heritage ===
The commune has two religious buildings that are registered as historical monuments:

- A former Presbytery (18th century)
- The Church of Saints Peter and Paul (12th century) The Church contains many items that are registered as historical objects:
  - 2 Paintings: Saint John the Baptist and the Virgin of the Assumption (17th century)
  - A Group Sculpture: Christ bound with Angels and emblems (1549)
  - A Statue: Christ on the Cross (18th century)
  - A Paten (18th century)
  - A Collection Box (18th century)
  - A Wardrobe (18th century)
  - A Chalice (19th century)
  - A Door (1771)
  - A Baptismal font (16th century)
  - A Statue: Christ on the Cross (18th century)
  - 4 Columns (17th century)
  - The Furniture in the Church
  - Stained glass figures (16th century)

Church Picture Gallery

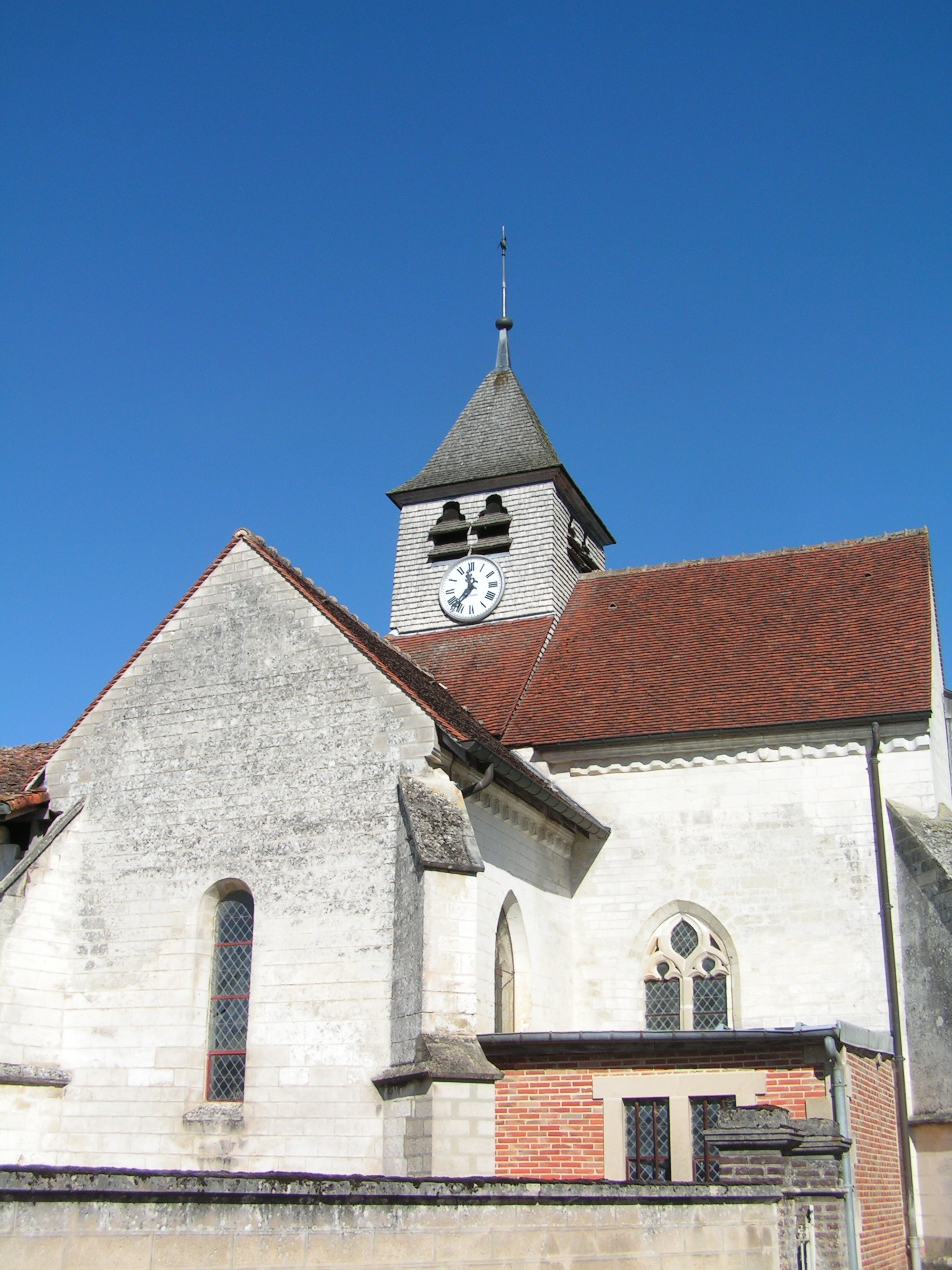
Church exterior

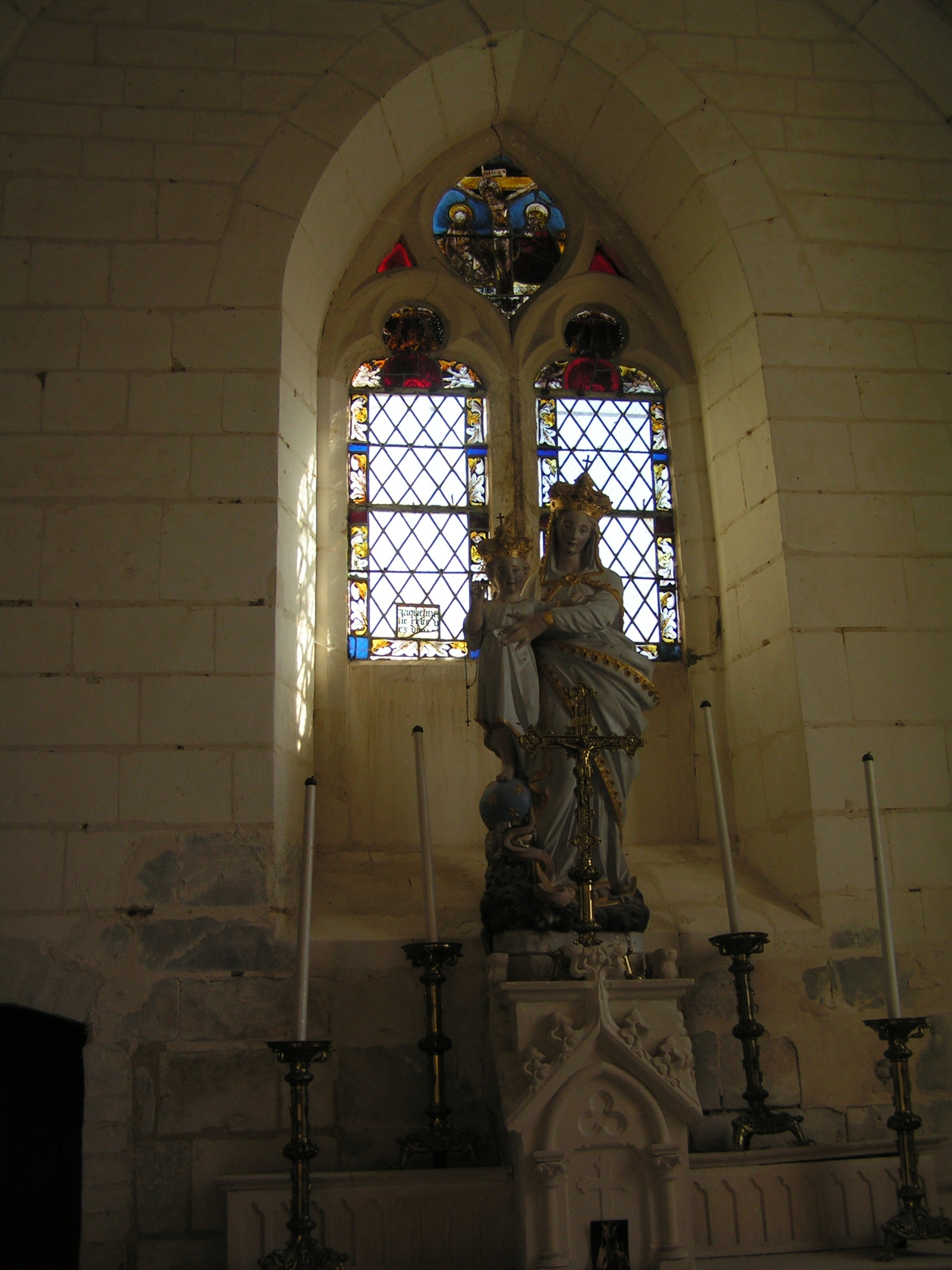
Stained glass and statue in the Church

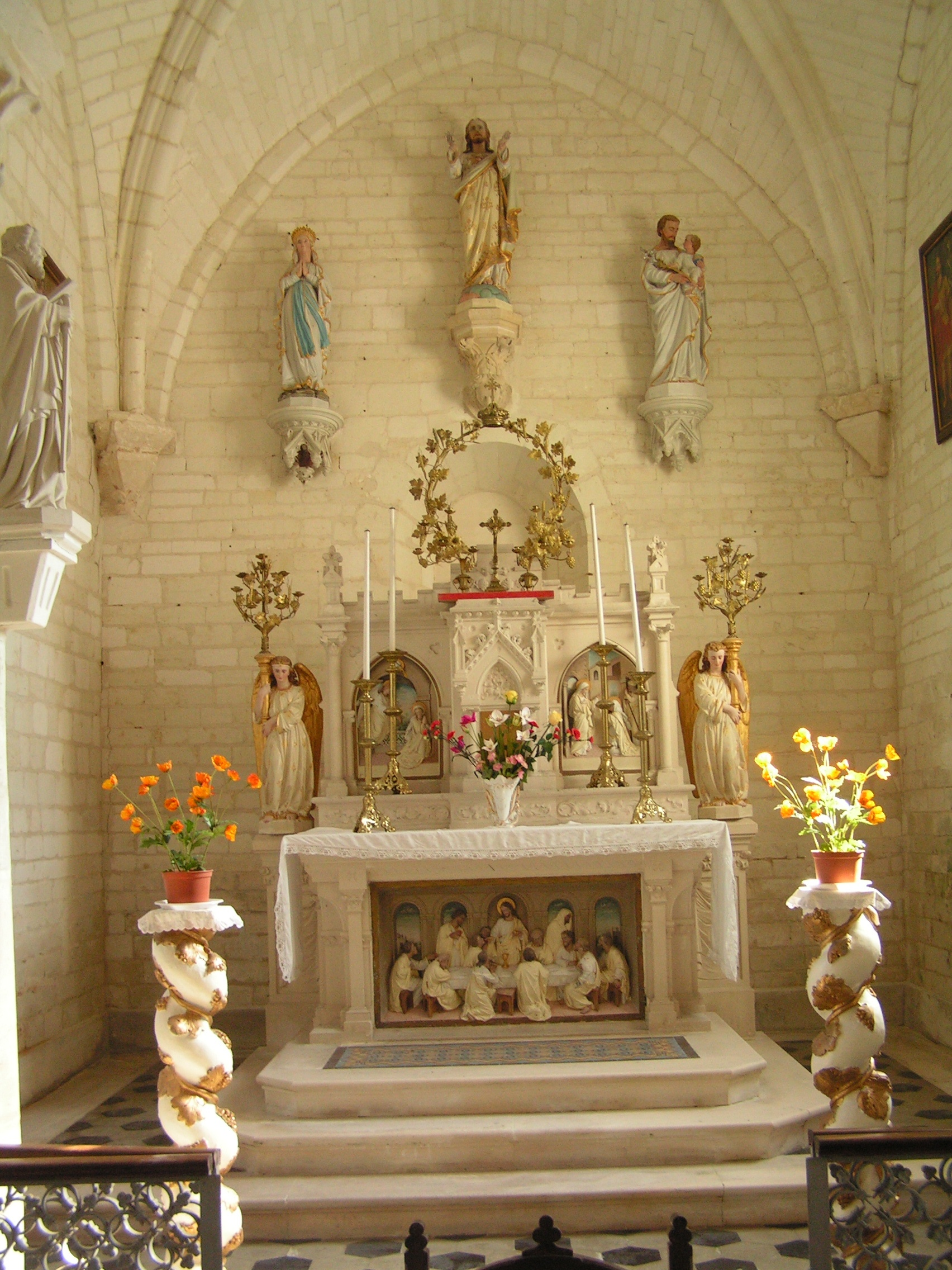
The Church Altar

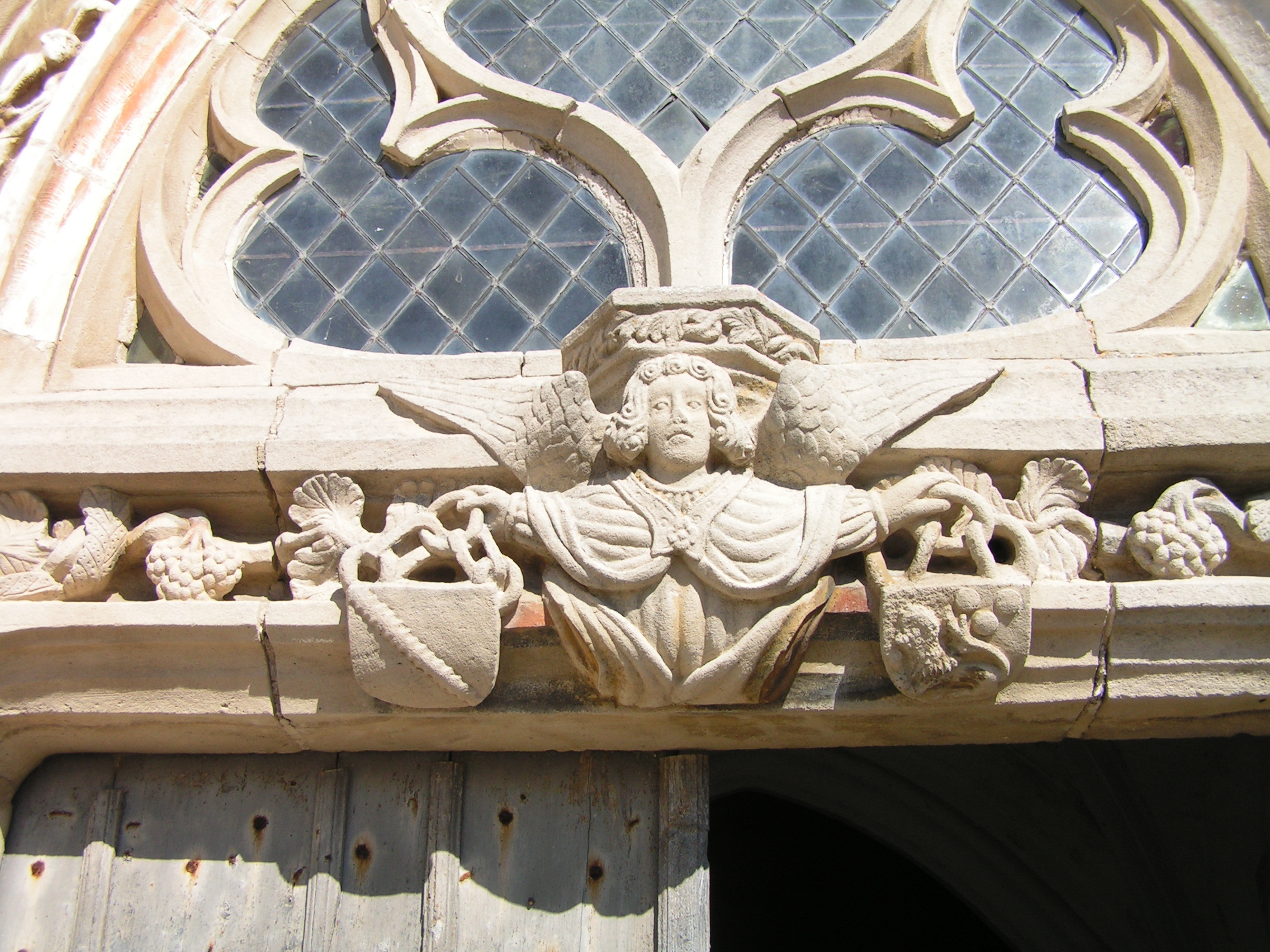
Detail on the Church

== Notable people linked to the commune ==
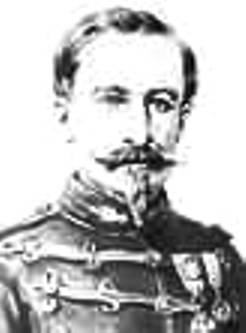
Charles Ragon de Bange

- Charles Ragon de Bange (1833-1914), born in Balignicourt, invented the first effective obturator (valve closure) system for breech-loading artillery.

== See also ==
- Communes of the Aube department
