= Pierre de Ruel, marquis de Beurnonville =

French general (1752–1821)

Pierre Riel Marquis de Beurnonville
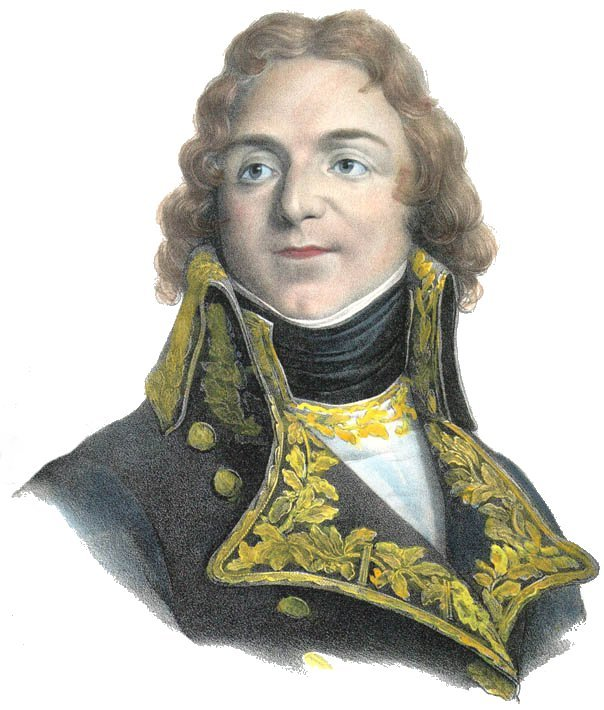
- A portrait of the marquis sometime during the Revolution
- Born: 10 May 1752; Champignol-lez-Mondeville, Champagne, Kingdom of France
- Died: 23 April 1821 (aged 69) Paris, Kingdom of France
- Allegiance: Kingdom of France; First French Republic; First French Empire; Kingdom of France
- Branch: (Kingdom of France) French Royal Army (France) French Revolutionary Army (France) French Imperial Army; French Royal Army
- Rank: Marshal of France
- Commands: Army of the Moselle
- Conflicts: French Revolutionary Wars; Battle of Valmy; Battle of Jemappes; Napoleonic Wars

Pierre de Ruel, marquis de Beurnonville (10 May 1752 – 23 April 1821) was a French general during the French Revolutionary Wars and later a marshal of France and Deputy Grand Master of Grand Orient de France.

== Biography ==
Bournonville was born at Champignol-lez-Mondeville, Aube.

After service in the colonies, he married a wealthy Creole, Geneviève Gillot L'Étang. After his return to France, he purchased the post of lieutenant of the Swiss Guard of the Count of Provence.

During the French Revolution he was named lieutenant-general, and took an active part in the battles of Valmy and Jemmapes. Appointed Minister of War in February 1793, he denounced his old commander, Charles François Dumouriez, to the Convention, and was one of the four deputies sent to watch him.

Handed over by Dumouriez to the Austrians on 3 April 1793, Beurnonville was not exchanged until November 1795. He entered the service again, commanded the Army of Sambre-et-Meuse and Army of the North, and was appointed inspector of infantry of the Army of England in 1798. He was sent as ambassador to Berlin in 1800, and to Madrid in 1802.

Napoleon made him a senator and count of the empire. In 1814 he was a member of the provisional government organized after the abdication of Napoleon. He followed Louis XVIII to exile in Ghent, and after the second restoration was made marquis and marshal of France (1816).

== Notes ==
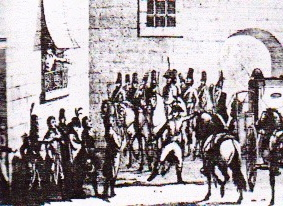
Dumouriez arresting the Commissioners in 1793

Political offices
Preceded by Jean-Nicolas Pache	French Minister of War; 4 February 1793 – 1 April 1793	Succeeded by Pierre Henri Hélène Marie Lebrun-Tondu

Military offices
Preceded by Étienne Deprez-Crassier	Commander-in-chief of the Army of the Moselle; 15 November 1792 – 23 January 1793	Succeeded by René Charles de Ligniville
Preceded by Joseph Souham	Commander-in-chief of the Army of the North; 4 April – 15 September 1796	Succeeded by Jean François Aimé Dejean
Preceded by Jean-Baptiste Jourdan	Commander-in-chief of the Army of Sambre-et-Meuse; 23 September 1796 – 23 January 1797	Succeeded by Jean Étienne Championnet
Preceded by Jean François Aimé Dejean	Commander-in-chief of the Army of the North; 25 September 1797 – 2 January 1798	Succeeded by Jacques MacDonald
