= Chapelle Saint-Jean-Baptiste de Jaucourt =

Chapel located in Jancourt, France

Coordinates: 48°15′30″N 4°38′47″E

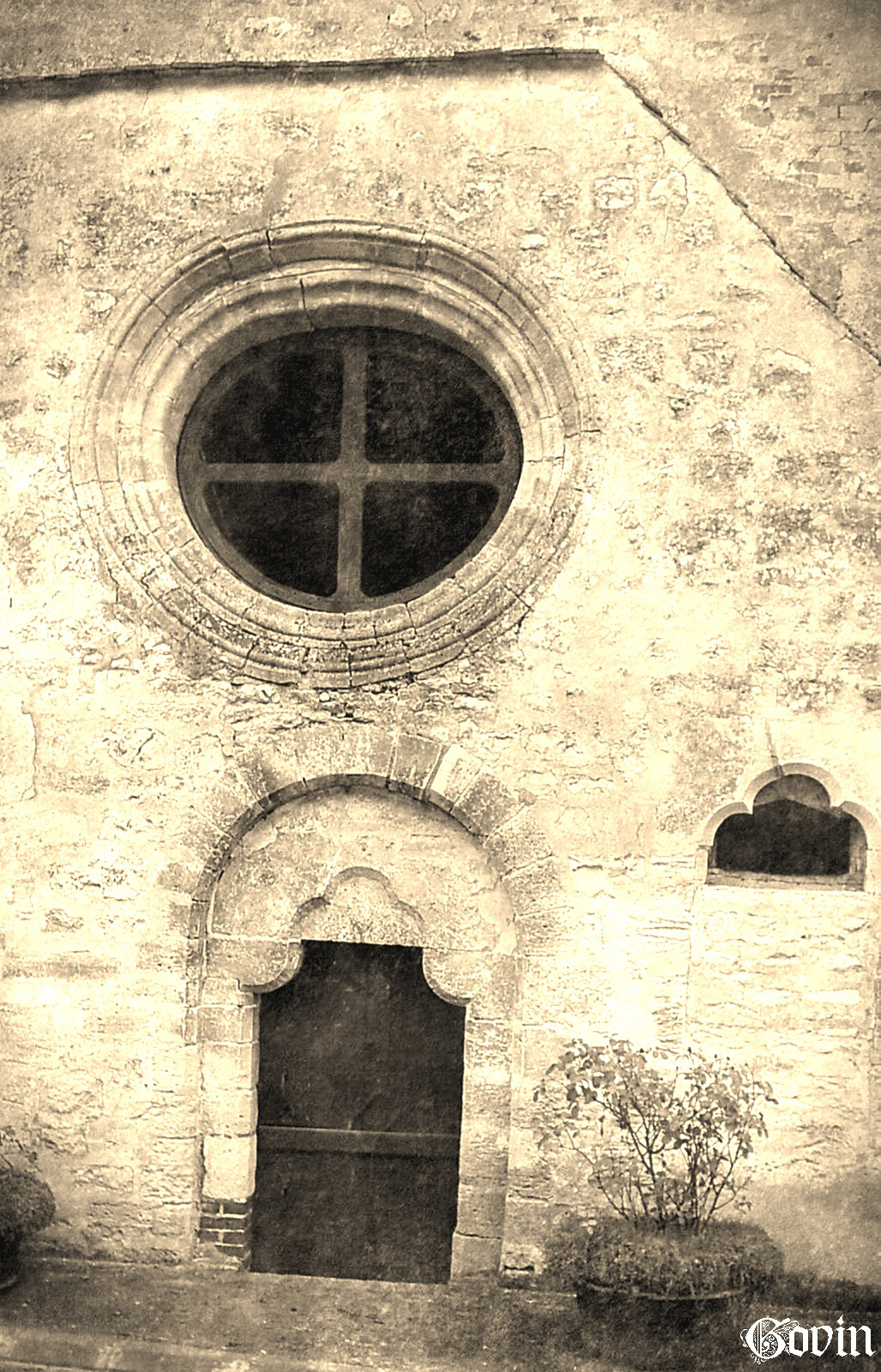
Chapelle de Jaucourt.

The Chapelle Saint-Jean-Baptiste de Jaucourt is a chapel dedicated to St John the Baptist in the commune of Jaucourt in the Aube département of France. It is the last remnant of the former castle.

== Description ==
On a rectangular plan measuring 5.4 by 10 metres, its Romanesque doorway has a trefoil tympanum.

== History ==
The chapel dates from the last quarter of the 12th century and the 13th century. It has been listed since 1994 as a monument historique by the French Ministry of Culture.

== See also ==
- List of castles in France
