= Courcelles-sur-Voire =

Commune in Grand Est, France

- Commune
- Location of Courcelles-sur-Voire
- Location within France Location within Grand Est
- Coordinates: 48°28′23″N 4°32′23″E
- Country: France
- Region: Grand Est
- Department: Aube
- Arrondissement: Bar-sur-Aube
- Canton: Brienne-le-Château

Government
  - Mayor (2020–2026): Pascal Petiot
- Area^{1}: 4.9 km^{2} (1.9 sq mi)
- Elevation: 120 m (390 ft)
- Population (2023): 22
  - Density: 4.5/km^{2} (12/sq mi)
- Time zone: UTC+01:00 (CET)
  - Summer (DST): UTC+02:00 (CEST)
- INSEE/Postal code: 10105 /10500
- ^{1} French Land Register data, which excludes lakes, ponds, glaciers > 1 km^{2} (0.386 sq mi or 247 acres) and river estuaries.

Courcelles-sur-Voire (French pronunciation: [kuʁsɛl syʁ vwaʁ], literally Courcelles on Voire) is a commune in the Aube department in north-central France.

== Population ==
Historical population
Year	Pop.	±% p.a.
1968	44	—
1975	30	−5.32%
1982	27	−1.49%
1990	25	−0.96%
1999	25	+0.00%
2007	35	+4.30%
2012	25	−6.51%
2017	27	+1.55%
2023	22	−3.36%
Source: INSEE

== See also ==
- Communes of the Aube department
