= Jaucourt =

Jaucourt is the name of:

- Jaucourt, Aube, a municipality in the Aube département in France
- Arnail François, Marquis de Jaucourt, French politician
- Louis de Jaucourt, French physicist and writer, a major contributor to Diderot's Encyclopédie
