= Pars-lès-Chavanges =

Commune in Grand Est, France

- Commune
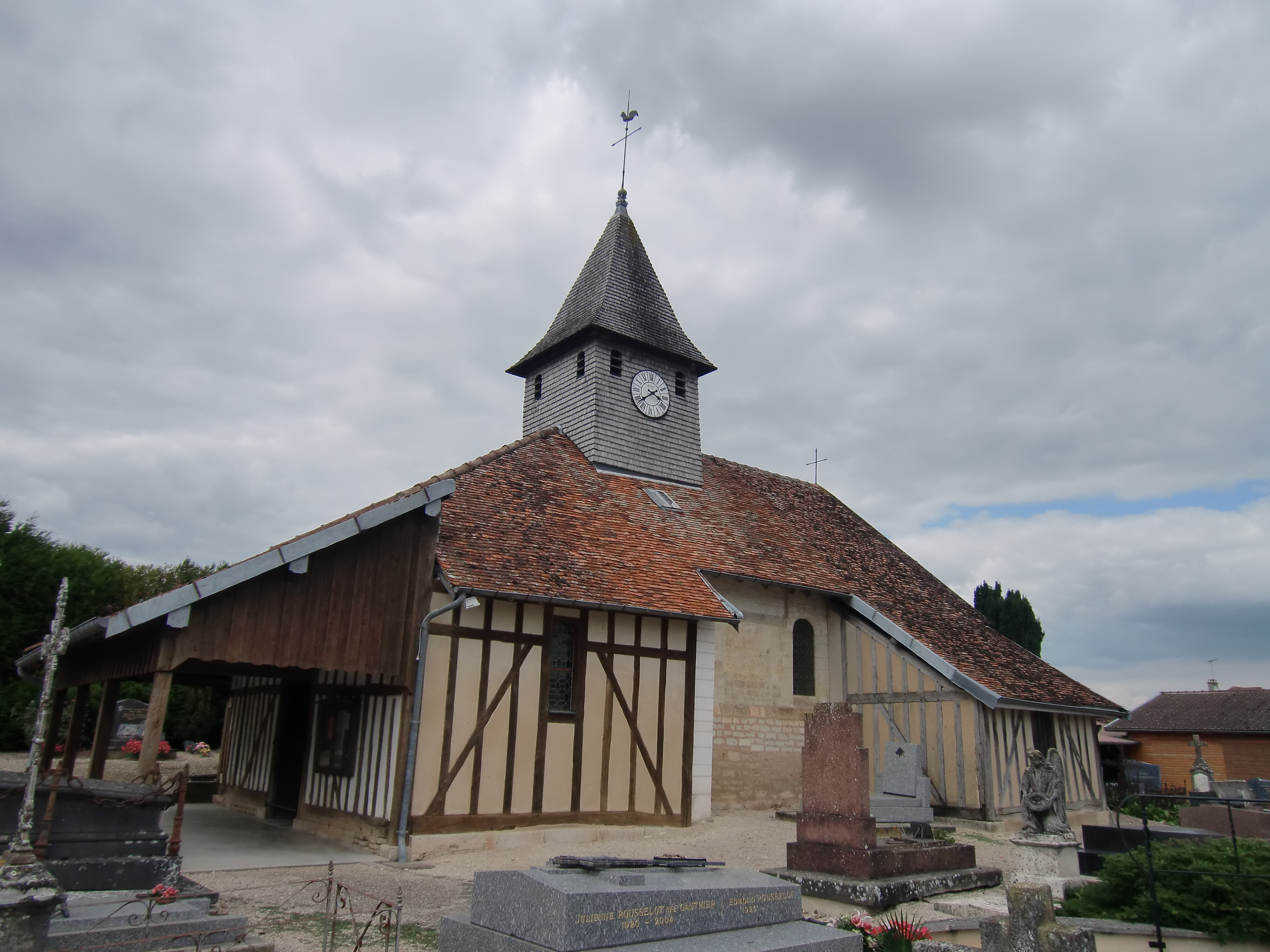
- The church in Pars-lès-Chavanges
- Location of Pars-lès-Chavanges
- Location within France Location within Grand Est
- Coordinates: 48°30′28″N 4°29′57″E
- Country: France
- Region: Grand Est
- Department: Aube
- Arrondissement: Bar-sur-Aube
- Canton: Brienne-le-Château

Government
  - Mayor (2020–2026): Joëlle Pesme
- Area^{1}: 8.5 km^{2} (3.3 sq mi)
- Elevation: 150 m (490 ft)
- Population (2023): 45
  - Density: 5.3/km^{2} (14/sq mi)
- Time zone: UTC+01:00 (CET)
  - Summer (DST): UTC+02:00 (CEST)
- INSEE/Postal code: 10279 /10330
- ^{1} French Land Register data, which excludes lakes, ponds, glaciers > 1 km^{2} (0.386 sq mi or 247 acres) and river estuaries.

Pars-lès-Chavanges (French pronunciation: [paʁ lɛ ʃavɑ̃ʒ], literally Pars near Chavanges) is a commune in the Aube department in north-central France.

== Population ==
Historical population
Year	Pop.	±% p.a.
1968	102	—
1975	107	+0.69%
1982	88	−2.75%
1990	80	−1.18%
1999	70	−1.47%
2007	69	−0.18%
2012	72	+0.85%
2017	66	−1.73%
2023	45	−6.18%
Source: INSEE

== See also ==
- Communes of the Aube department
