= Jean François Aimé Dejean =

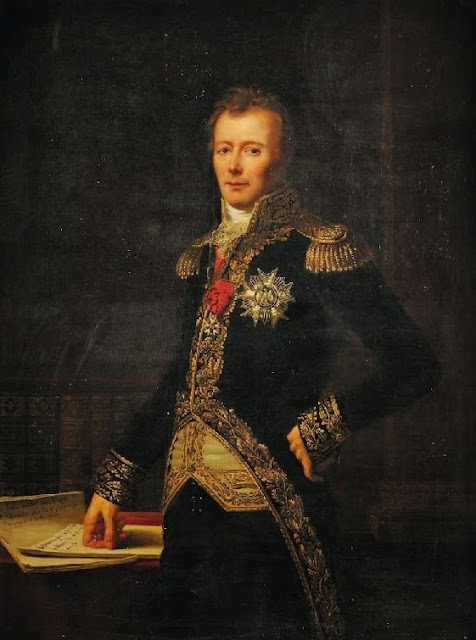
Portrait by Robert Lefèvre, 1805

Jean-François Aimé, Count of Dejean (1749–1824), was a French army officer and minister of state in the service of the French First Republic and the First French Empire.

== Biography ==
Jean-François was born in 1749 in Castelnaudary, Languedoc. He entered the Royal French army as a second lieutenant in the engineering school of Mézières in 1766.

At the time of the French Revolution, Dejean embraced the principles of moderate reform. His talents in military administration gained him rapid advancement through the ranks of the army engineers. He replaced Pierre de Ruel, marquis de Beurnonville as commander of the Army of the North on 16 September 1796 and his tenure lasted until 24 September 1797 when he handed the assignment back to Beurnonville.

Dejean performed a variety of important missions as a consulate, including to Genoa, where he lived for nearly two years with the title of minister extraordinary. He was recalled to Paris in 1802 to take the portfolio of Minister of War Administration (a position he held until 1809). Shortly before his retirement from the ministry, he was promoted to the rank of chief inspector-general of fortifications. The Emperor Napoleon soon afterwards made him a senator and a Trésorier de la légion-d'honneur (treasurer of the Legion of Honour).

After the abdication of Napoleon in 1814, Dejean joined the Provisional Government, and performed the difficult task of extraordinary commissioner to Comte d'Artois (the future Charles X). He was also appointed, a Peer of France, Governor of L'Ecole Polytechnique and Chairman of the Committee for the Liquidation of Arrears. But in 1815, having accepted service under Napoleon Bonaparte during the Hundred Days, he was removed from all public offices on return of the Bourbon regime.

In 1819 Dejean returned to the Chambre des Pairs (French House of Lords), where he consistently supported the liberal opposition. He died on 12 May 1824.

== Notes ==
Military offices
Preceded by Pierre de Ruel, marquis de Beurnonville	Commander-in-chief of the Army of the North; 16 September 1796 – 24 September 1797	Succeeded by Pierre de Ruel, marquis de Beurnonville
