= Rives Dervoises =

- Commune
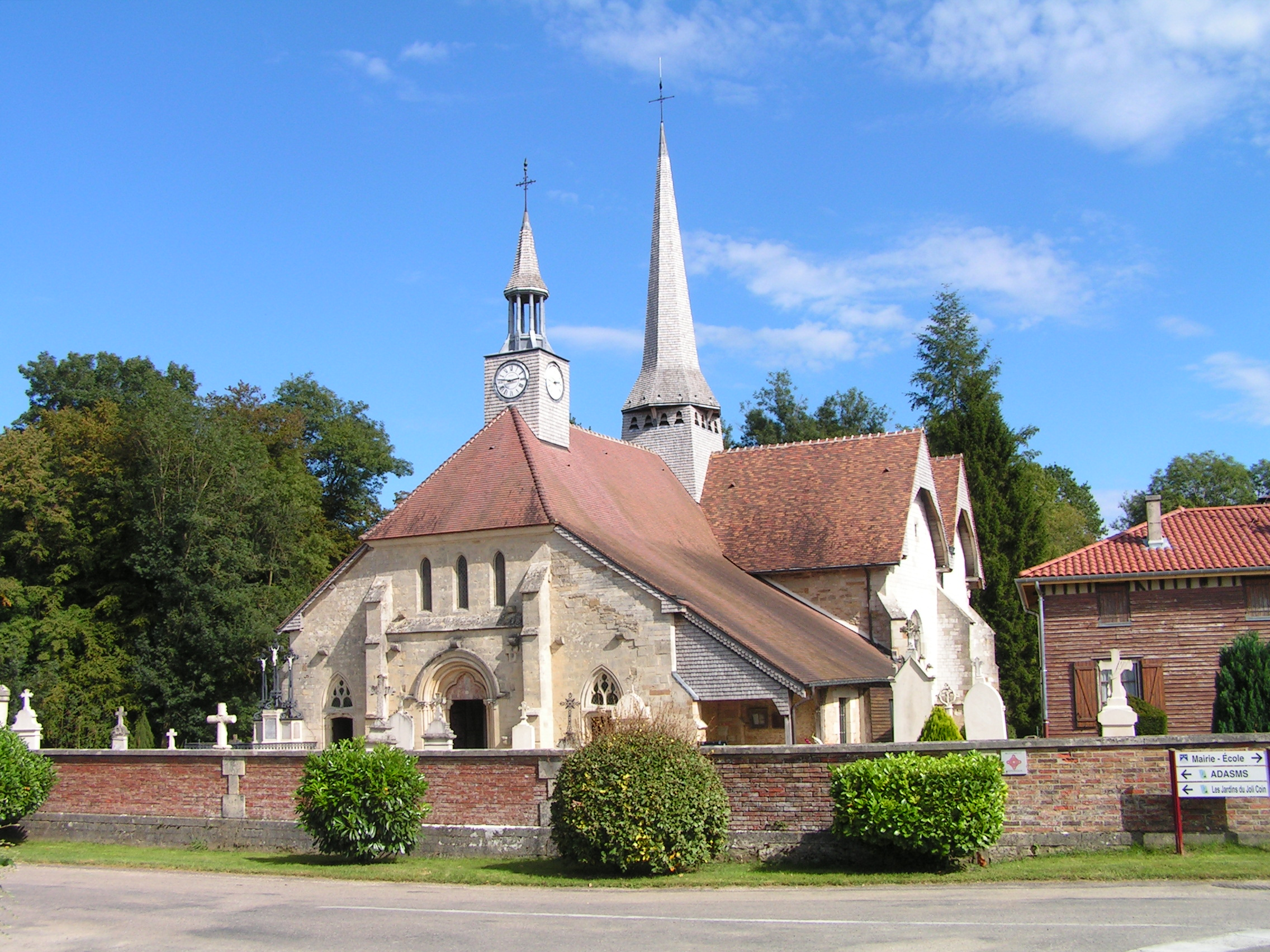
- The church in Puellemontier
- Location of Rives Dervoises
- Location within France Location within Grand Est
- Coordinates: 48°29′24″N 4°41′56″E
- Country: France
- Region: Grand Est
- Department: Haute-Marne
- Arrondissement: Saint-Dizier
- Canton: Wassy
- Intercommunality: CA Grand Saint-Dizier, Der et Vallées

Government
  - Mayor (2020–2026): Christiane Welti
- Area^{1}: 76.70 km^{2} (29.61 sq mi)
- Population (2023): 1,301
  - Density: 16.96/km^{2} (43.93/sq mi)
- Time zone: UTC+01:00 (CET)
  - Summer (DST): UTC+02:00 (CEST)
- INSEE/Postal code: 52411 /52220
- ^{1} French Land Register data, which excludes lakes, ponds, glaciers > 1 km^{2} (0.386 sq mi or 247 acres) and river estuaries.

Rives Dervoises (French pronunciation: [ʁiv dɛʁvwaz]) is a commune in the Haute-Marne department of northeastern France. The municipality was established on 1 January 2016 and consists of the former communes of Droyes, Longeville-sur-la-Laines, Louze and Puellemontier.

== See also ==
- Communes of the Haute-Marne department
