= Soulaines-Dhuys =

Commune in Grand Est, France

- Commune
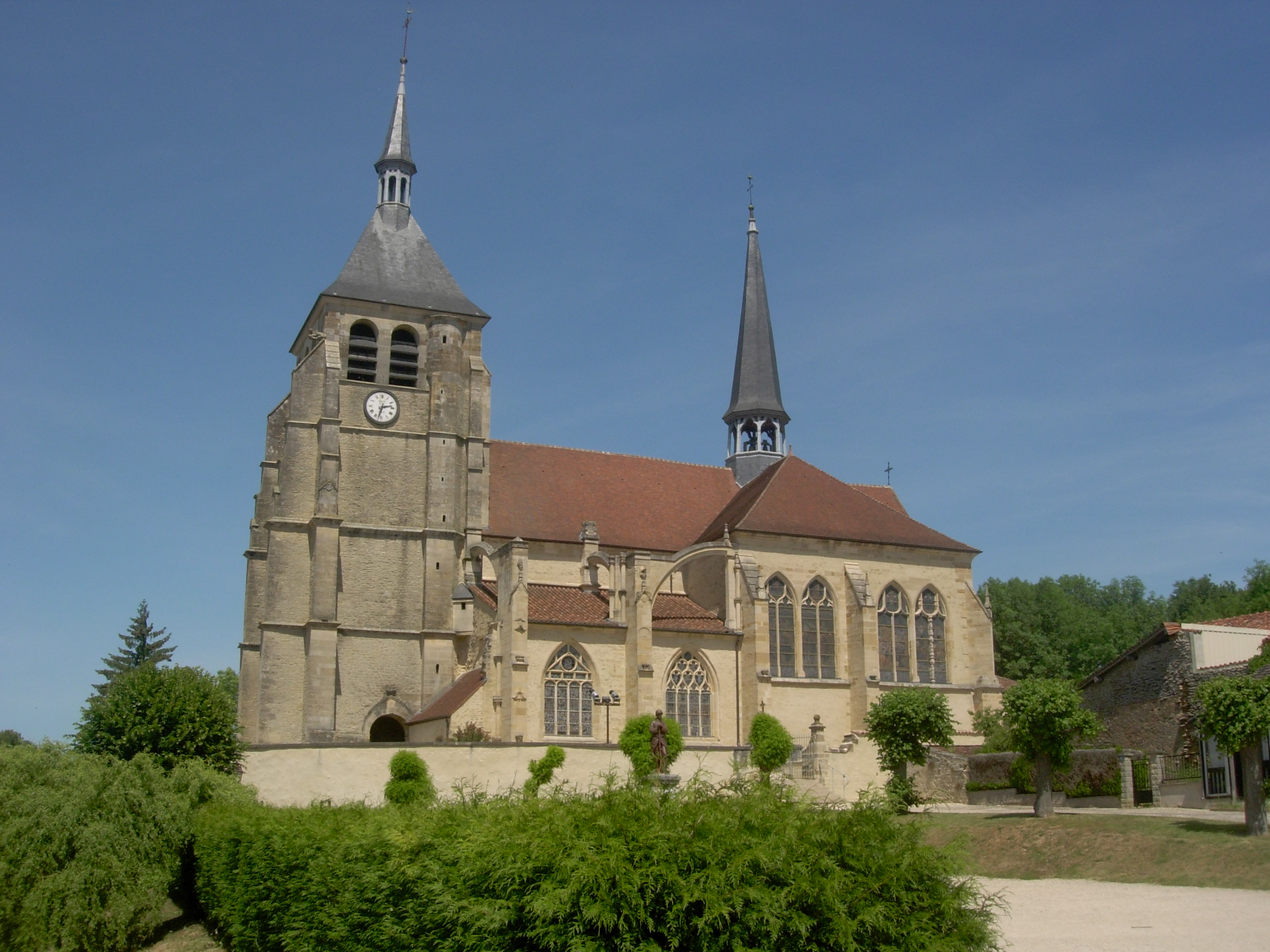
- The church in Soulaines-Dhuys

- Coat of arms
- Location of Soulaines-Dhuys
- Location within France Location within Grand Est
- Coordinates: 48°22′29″N 4°44′03″E
- Country: France
- Region: Grand Est
- Department: Aube
- Arrondissement: Bar-sur-Aube
- Canton: Bar-sur-Aube

Government
  - Mayor (2020–2026): Philippe Dallemagne
- Area^{1}: 20.06 km^{2} (7.75 sq mi)
- Elevation: 134 m (440 ft)
- Highest elevation: 196 m (643 ft)
- Lowest elevation: 127 m (417 ft)
- Population (2023): 420
  - Density: 21/km^{2} (54/sq mi)
- Time zone: UTC+01:00 (CET)
  - Summer (DST): UTC+02:00 (CEST)
- INSEE/Postal code: 10372 /10200
- ^{1} French Land Register data, which excludes lakes, ponds, glaciers > 1 km^{2} (0.386 sq mi or 247 acres) and river estuaries.

Soulaines-Dhuys (French pronunciation: [sulɛn dɥi]) is a commune in the Aube department of the Grand Est region of northern France.

== Population ==
Historical population
Year	Pop.	±% p.a.
1968	311	—
1975	270	−2.00%
1982	253	−0.92%
1990	254	+0.05%
1999	267	+0.56%
2007	297	+1.34%
2012	338	+2.62%
2017	413	+4.09%
2023	420	+0.28%
Source: INSEE

== See also ==
- Communes of the Aube department
