= Louze =

- Part of Rives Dervoises
- Location of Louze
- Location within France Location within Grand Est
- Coordinates: 48°26′03″N 4°43′07″E
- Country: France
- Region: Grand Est
- Department: Haute-Marne
- Arrondissement: Saint-Dizier
- Canton: Wassy
- Commune: Rives Dervoises
- Area^{1}: 20.65 km^{2} (7.97 sq mi)
- Elevation: 127 m (417 ft)
- Highest elevation: 161 m (528 ft)
- Lowest elevation: 121 m (397 ft)
- Population (2022): 296
  - Density: 14.3/km^{2} (37.1/sq mi)
- Time zone: UTC+01:00 (CET)
  - Summer (DST): UTC+02:00 (CEST)
- Postal code: 52220
- ^{1} French Land Register data, which excludes lakes, ponds, glaciers > 1 km^{2} (0.386 sq mi or 247 acres) and river estuaries.

Louze is a former commune in the Haute-Marne department in north-eastern France. On 1 January 2016, it was merged into the new commune Rives Dervoises. Its population was 296 in 2022.

== See also ==
- Communes of the Haute-Marne department
