= Longeville-sur-la-Laines =

- Part of Rives Dervoises
- Location of Longeville-sur-la-Laines
- Location within France Location within Grand Est
- Coordinates: 48°27′20″N 4°41′11″E
- Country: France
- Region: Grand Est
- Department: Haute-Marne
- Arrondissement: Saint-Dizier
- Canton: Wassy
- Commune: Rives Dervoises
- Area^{1}: 15.6 km^{2} (6.0 sq mi)
- Highest elevation: 162 m (531 ft)
- Lowest elevation: 118 m (387 ft)
- Population (2022): 401
  - Density: 25.7/km^{2} (66.6/sq mi)
- Time zone: UTC+01:00 (CET)
  - Summer (DST): UTC+02:00 (CEST)
- Postal code: 52220
- ^{1} French Land Register data, which excludes lakes, ponds, glaciers > 1 km^{2} (0.386 sq mi or 247 acres) and river estuaries.

Longeville-sur-la-Laines is a former commune in the Haute-Marne department in north-eastern France. On 1 January 2016, it was merged into the new commune Rives Dervoises. Its population was 401 in 2022.

== See also ==
- Communes of the Haute-Marne department
