= Fontaine, Aube =

Commune in Grand Est, France

Fontaine
- Commune
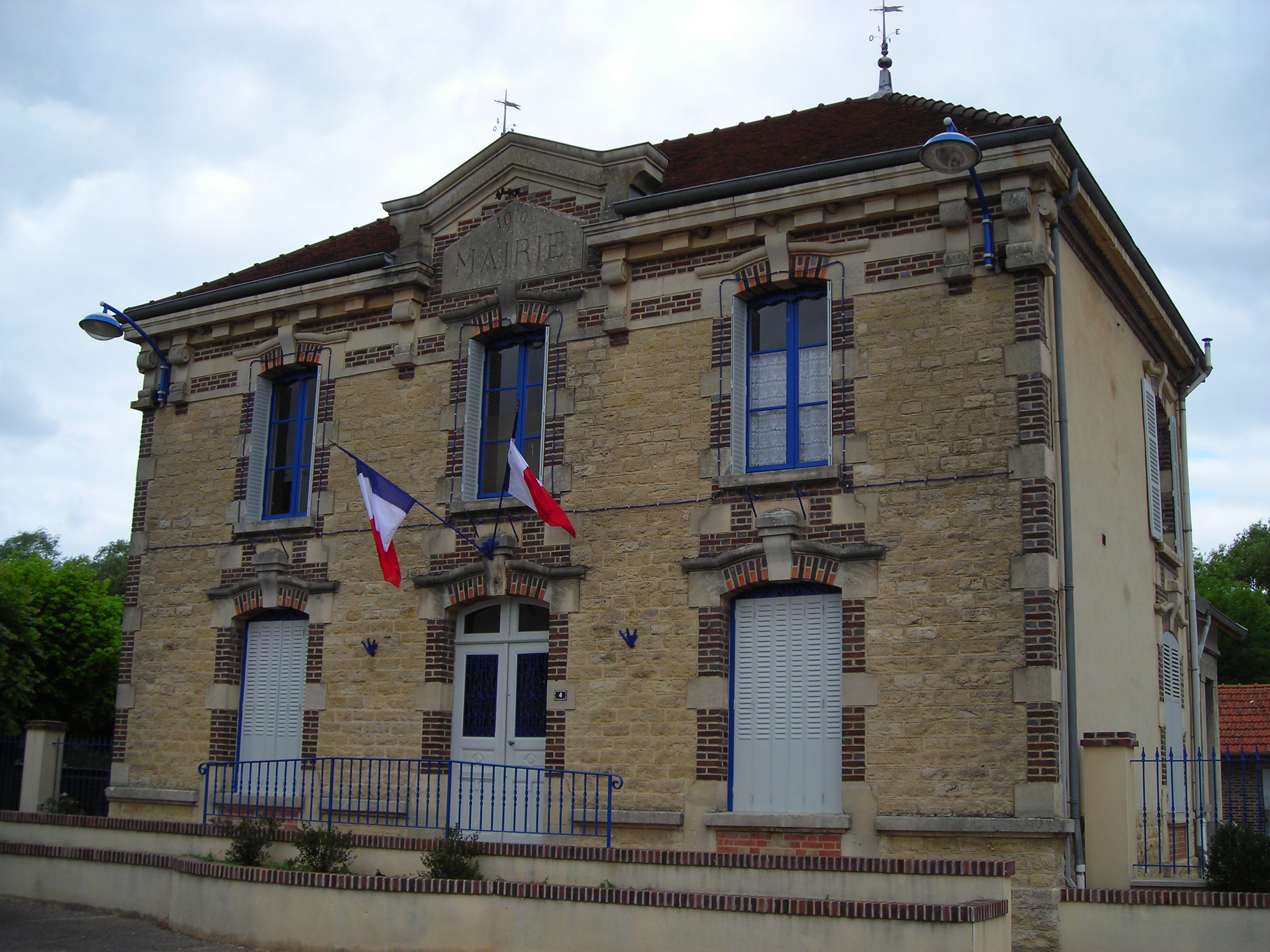
- Town hall

- Coat of arms
- Location of Fontaine
- Location within France Location within Grand Est
- Coordinates: 48°12′51″N 4°42′57″E
- Country: France
- Region: Grand Est
- Department: Aube
- Arrondissement: Bar-sur-Aube
- Canton: Bar-sur-Aube
- Intercommunality: Région de Bar-sur-Aube

Government
  - Mayor (2020–2026): Pascal Lemoine
- Area^{1}: 5.68 km^{2} (2.19 sq mi)
- Elevation: 170 m (560 ft)
- Population (2023): 246
  - Density: 43.3/km^{2} (112/sq mi)
- Time zone: UTC+01:00 (CET)
  - Summer (DST): UTC+02:00 (CEST)
- INSEE/Postal code: 10150 /10200
- ^{1} French Land Register data, which excludes lakes, ponds, glaciers > 1 km^{2} (0.386 sq mi or 247 acres) and river estuaries.

Fontaine (French pronunciation: [fɔ̃tɛn]) is a commune in the Aube department in north-central France.

== Population ==
Historical population
Year	Pop.	±% p.a.
1968	271	—
1975	290	+0.97%
1982	314	+1.14%
1990	288	−1.07%
1999	255	−1.34%
2007	301	+2.09%
2012	279	−1.51%
2017	258	−1.55%
2023	246	−0.79%
Source: INSEE

== See also ==
- Communes of the Aube department
- List of medieval bridges in France
