= Arrondissement of Bar-sur-Aube =

Coordinates: 48.23°N 4.70°E

Bar-sur-Aube
- Arrondissement
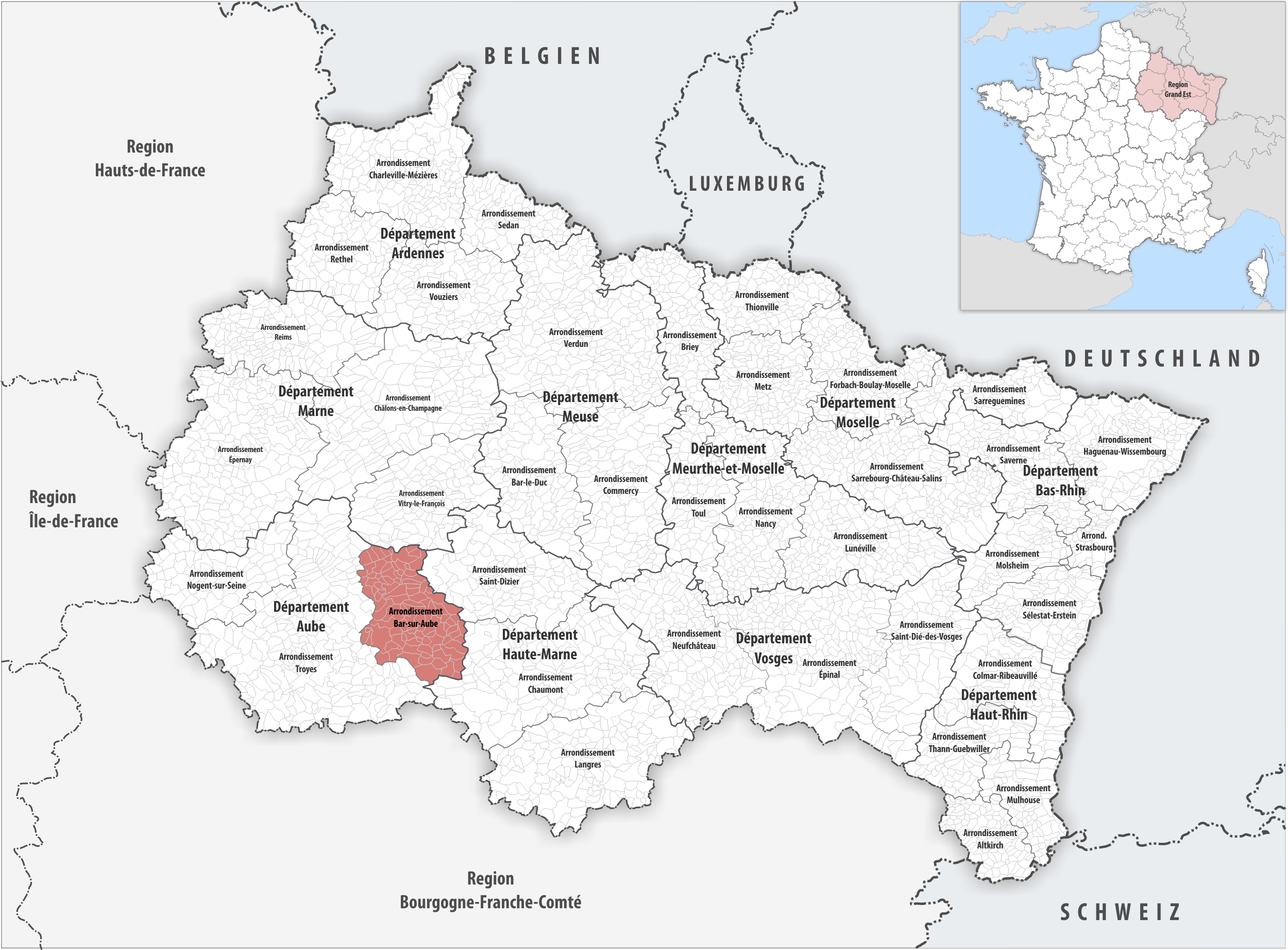
- Location within the region Grand Est
- Country: France
- Region: Grand Est
- Department: Aube
- No. of communes: {{{nbcomm}}}
- Area: 1,240.1 km^{2} (478.8 sq mi)
- Population (2023): 26,533
  - Density: 21.396/km^{2} (55.415/sq mi)
- INSEE code: 101

The arrondissement of Bar-sur-Aube is an arrondissement of France in the Aube department in the Grand Est region. It has 108 communes. Its population is 27,162 (2021), and its area is 1,240.1 km^{2} (478.8 sq mi).

== Composition ==
The communes of the arrondissement of Bar-sur-Aube, and their INSEE codes are:

1. Ailleville (10002)
2. Amance (10005)
3. Arconville (10007)
4. Argançon (10008)
5. Arrembécourt (10010)
6. Arrentières (10011)
7. Arsonval (10012)
8. Aulnay (10017)
9. Bailly-le-Franc (10026)
10. Balignicourt (10027)
11. Baroville (10032)
12. Bar-sur-Aube (10033)
13. Bayel (10035)
14. Bergères (10039)
15. Bétignicourt (10044)
16. Beurey (10045)
17. Blaincourt-sur-Aube (10046)
18. Blignicourt (10047)
19. Bligny (10048)
20. Bossancourt (10050)
21. Braux (10059)
22. Brienne-la-Vieille (10063)
23. Brienne-le-Château (10064)
24. La Chaise (10072)
25. Chalette-sur-Voire (10073)
26. Champignol-lez-Mondeville (10076)
27. Champ-sur-Barse (10078)
28. Chaumesnil (10093)
29. Chavanges (10094)
30. Colombé-la-Fosse (10102)
31. Colombé-le-Sec (10103)
32. Courcelles-sur-Voire (10105)
33. Couvignon (10113)
34. Crespy-le-Neuf (10117)
35. Dienville (10123)
36. Dolancourt (10126)
37. Donnement (10128)
38. Éclance (10135)
39. Engente (10137)
40. Épagne (10138)
41. Épothémont (10139)
42. Fontaine (10150)
43. Fravaux (10160)
44. Fresnay (10161)
45. Fuligny (10163)
46. Hampigny (10171)
47. Jasseines (10175)
48. Jaucourt (10176)
49. Jessains (10178)
50. Joncreuil (10180)
51. Juvancourt (10182)
52. Juvanzé (10183)
53. Juzanvigny (10184)
54. Lassicourt (10189)
55. Lentilles (10192)
56. Lesmont (10193)
57. Lévigny (10194)
58. Lignol-le-Château (10197)
59. La Loge-aux-Chèvres (10200)
60. Longchamp-sur-Aujon (10203)
61. Longpré-le-Sec (10205)
62. Magnicourt (10214)
63. Magny-Fouchard (10215)
64. Maison-des-Champs (10217)
65. Maisons-lès-Soulaines (10219)
66. Maizières-lès-Brienne (10221)
67. Mathaux (10228)
68. Meurville (10242)
69. Molins-sur-Aube (10243)
70. Montier-en-l'Isle (10250)
71. Montmartin-le-Haut (10252)
72. Montmorency-Beaufort (10253)
73. Morvilliers (10258)
74. Pars-lès-Chavanges (10279)
75. Pel-et-Der (10283)
76. Perthes-lès-Brienne (10285)
77. Petit-Mesnil (10286)
78. Précy-Notre-Dame (10303)
79. Précy-Saint-Martin (10304)
80. Proverville (10306)
81. Puits-et-Nuisement (10310)
82. Radonvilliers (10313)
83. Rances (10315)
84. Rosnay-l'Hôpital (10326)
85. La Rothière (10327)
86. Rouvres-les-Vignes (10330)
87. Saint-Christophe-Dodinicourt (10337)
88. Saint-Léger-sous-Brienne (10345)
89. Saint-Léger-sous-Margerie (10346)
90. Saulcy (10366)
91. Soulaines-Dhuys (10372)
92. Spoy (10374)
93. Thil (10377)
94. Thors (10378)
95. Trannes (10384)
96. Unienville (10389)
97. Urville (10390)
98. Vallentigny (10393)
99. Vauchonvilliers (10397)
100. Vendeuvre-sur-Barse (10401)
101. Vernonvilliers (10403)
102. La Ville-aux-Bois (10411)
103. La Villeneuve-au-Chêne (10423)
104. Villeret (10424)
105. Ville-sous-la-Ferté (10426)
106. Ville-sur-Terre (10428)
107. Voigny (10440)
108. Yèvres-le-Petit (10445)

== History ==
The arrondissement of Bar-sur-Aube was created in 1800. At the January 2018 reorganization of the arrondissements of Aube, it gained four communes from the arrondissement of Troyes.

As a result of the reorganisation of the cantons of France which came into effect in 2015, the borders of the cantons are no longer related to the borders of the arrondissements. The cantons of the arrondissement of Bar-sur-Aube were, as of January 2015:

1. Bar-sur-Aube
2. Brienne-le-Château
3. Chavanges
4. Soulaines-Dhuys
5. Vendeuvre-sur-Barse
