= Chalette-sur-Voire =

Commune in Grand Est, France

- Commune
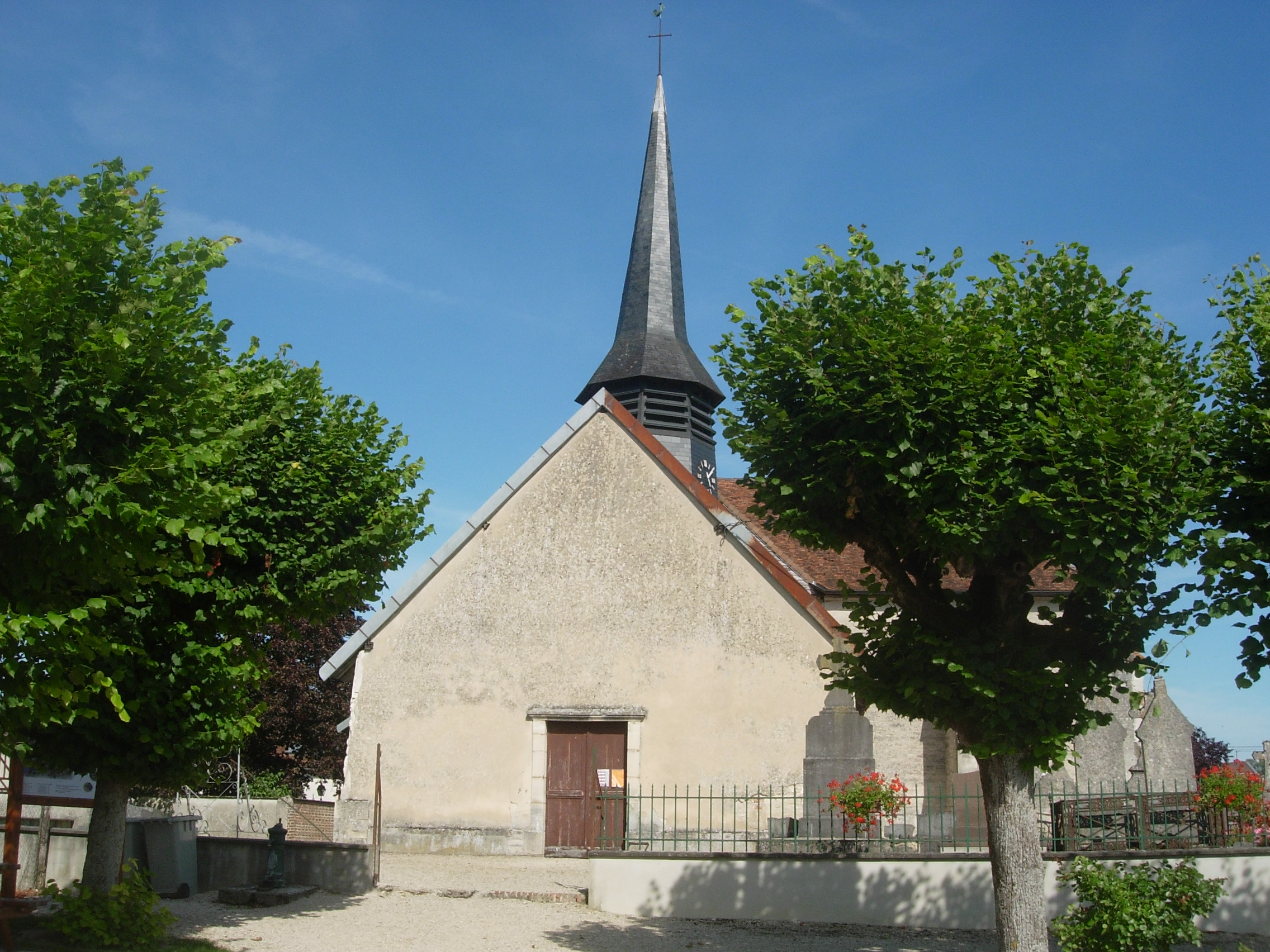
- The church in Chalette-sur-Voire

- Coat of arms
- Location of Chalette-sur-Voire
- Location within France Location within Grand Est
- Coordinates: 48°26′45″N 4°25′33″E
- Country: France
- Region: Grand Est
- Department: Aube
- Arrondissement: Bar-sur-Aube
- Canton: Brienne-le-Château

Government
  - Mayor (2020–2026): Jean-Philippe Residori
- Area^{1}: 5.64 km^{2} (2.18 sq mi)
- Elevation: 108 m (354 ft)
- Population (2023): 134
  - Density: 23.8/km^{2} (61.5/sq mi)
- Time zone: UTC+01:00 (CET)
  - Summer (DST): UTC+02:00 (CEST)
- INSEE/Postal code: 10073 /10500
- ^{1} French Land Register data, which excludes lakes, ponds, glaciers > 1 km^{2} (0.386 sq mi or 247 acres) and river estuaries.

Chalette-sur-Voire (French pronunciation: [ʃalɛt syʁ vwaʁ], literally Chalette on Voire) is a commune in the Aube department in north-central France.

== Population ==
Historical population
Year	Pop.	±% p.a.
1968	151	—
1975	135	−1.59%
1982	123	−1.32%
1990	129	+0.60%
1999	134	+0.42%
2007	140	+0.55%
2012	139	−0.14%
2017	133	−0.88%
2023	134	+0.12%
Source: INSEE

== See also ==
- Communes of the Aube department
