= Braux, Aube =

Commune in Grand Est, France

Braux
- Commune
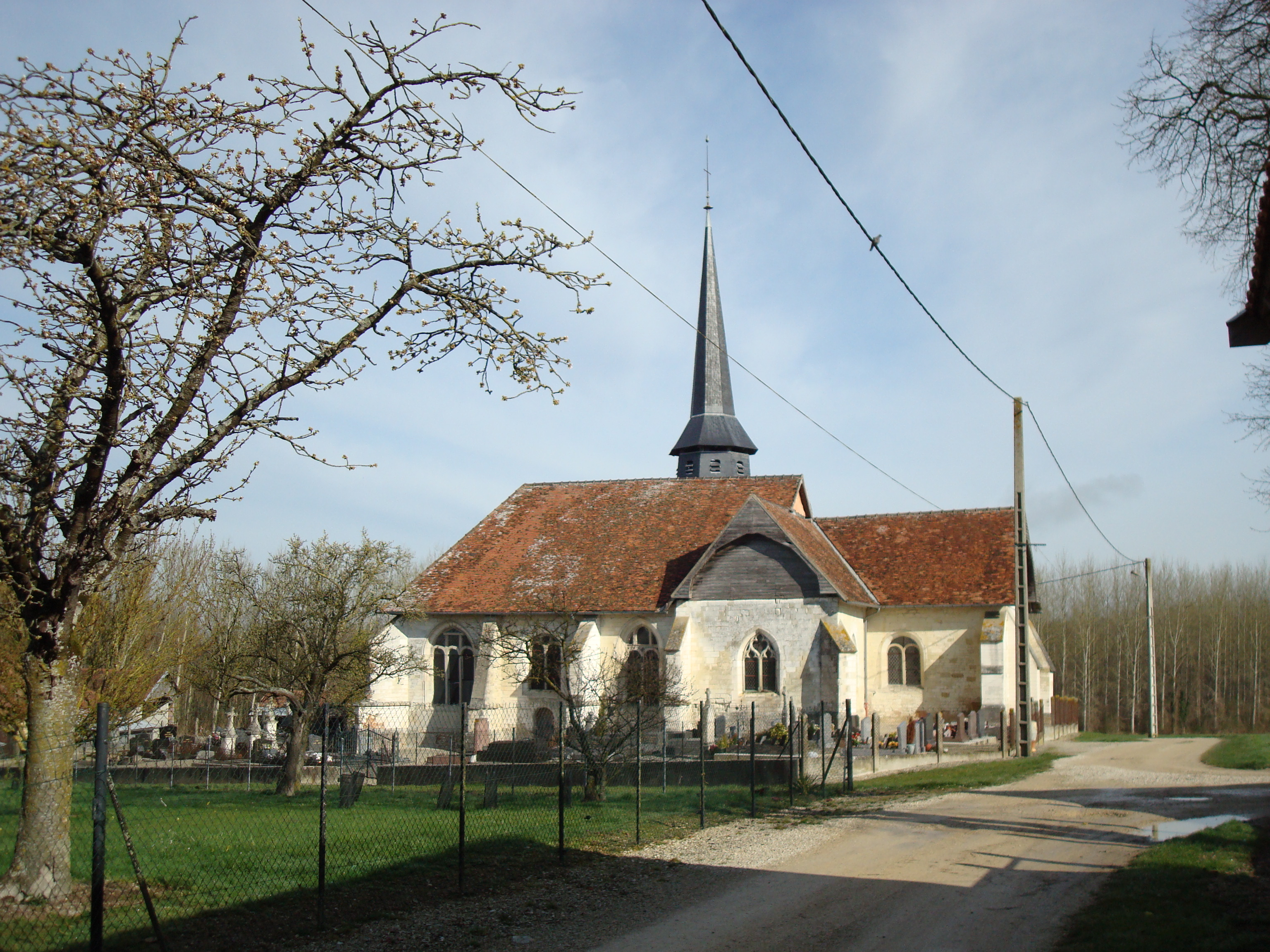
- The church in Braux

- Coat of arms
- Location of Braux
- Location within France Location within Grand Est
- Coordinates: 48°29′05″N 4°28′21″E
- Country: France
- Region: Grand Est
- Department: Aube
- Arrondissement: Bar-sur-Aube
- Canton: Brienne-le-Château

Government
  - Mayor (2020–2026): Claude Lorphelin
- Area^{1}: 15.21 km^{2} (5.87 sq mi)
- Elevation: 127 m (417 ft)
- Population (2023): 114
  - Density: 7.50/km^{2} (19.4/sq mi)
- Time zone: UTC+01:00 (CET)
  - Summer (DST): UTC+02:00 (CEST)
- INSEE/Postal code: 10059 /10500
- ^{1} French Land Register data, which excludes lakes, ponds, glaciers > 1 km^{2} (0.386 sq mi or 247 acres) and river estuaries.

Braux (French pronunciation: [bʁo]) is a commune in the Aube department in north-central France.

== Population ==
Historical population
Year	Pop.	±% p.a.
1968	160	—
1975	144	−1.49%
1982	124	−2.11%
1990	132	+0.78%
1999	121	−0.96%
2007	109	−1.30%
2012	104	−0.93%
2017	108	+0.76%
2023	114	+0.91%
Source: INSEE

== See also ==
- Communes of the Aube department
