= Puellemontier =

- Part of Rives Dervoises
- Location of Puellemontier
- Location within France Location within Grand Est
- Coordinates: 48°29′41″N 4°42′04″E
- Country: France
- Region: Grand Est
- Department: Haute-Marne
- Arrondissement: Saint-Dizier
- Canton: Wassy
- Commune: Rives Dervoises
- Area^{1}: 15.22 km^{2} (5.88 sq mi)
- Elevation: 125 m (410 ft)
- Highest elevation: 148 m (486 ft)
- Lowest elevation: 115 m (377 ft)
- Population (2022): 191
  - Density: 12.5/km^{2} (32.5/sq mi)
- Time zone: UTC+01:00 (CET)
  - Summer (DST): UTC+02:00 (CEST)
- Postal code: 52220
- ^{1} French Land Register data, which excludes lakes, ponds, glaciers > 1 km^{2} (0.386 sq mi or 247 acres) and river estuaries.

Puellemontier (French pronunciation: [pɥɛlmɔ̃tje]) is a former commune in the Haute-Marne department in north-eastern France. On 1 January 2016, it was merged into the new commune Rives Dervoises.

== See also ==
- Communes of the Haute-Marne department
