= Champignol-lez-Mondeville =

Commune in Grand Est, France

- Commune
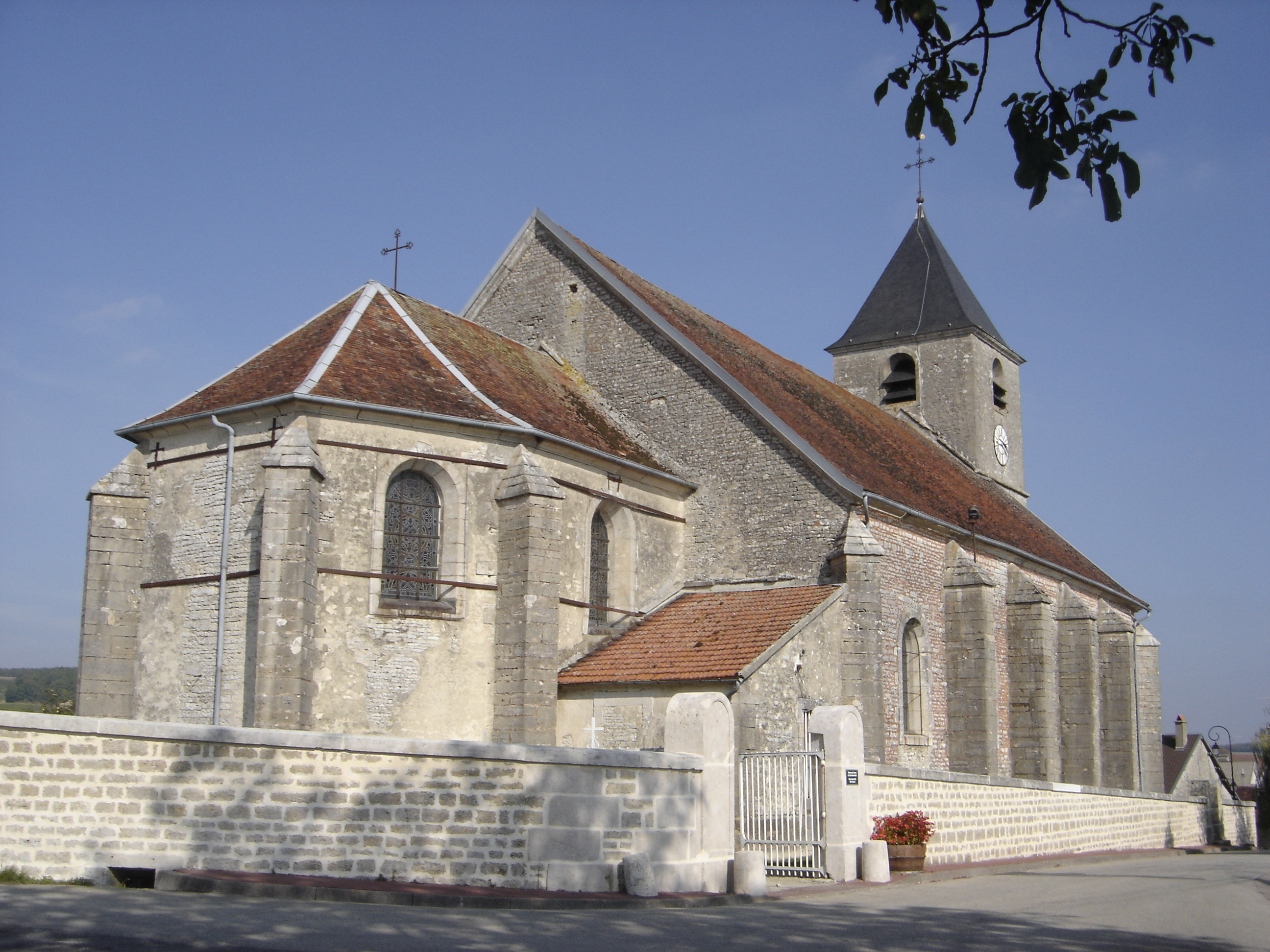
- The church in Champignol
- Location of Champignol-lez-Mondeville
- Location within France Location within Grand Est
- Coordinates: 48°08′20″N 4°40′32″E
- Country: France
- Region: Grand Est
- Department: Aube
- Arrondissement: Bar-sur-Aube
- Canton: Bar-sur-Aube
- Intercommunality: Région de Bar sur Aube

Government
  - Mayor (2020–2026): Fabrice Antoine
- Area^{1}: 44.17 km^{2} (17.05 sq mi)
- Elevation: 346 m (1,135 ft)
- Highest elevation: 369 m (1,211 ft)
- Population (2023): 260
  - Density: 5.9/km^{2} (15/sq mi)
- Time zone: UTC+01:00 (CET)
  - Summer (DST): UTC+02:00 (CEST)
- INSEE/Postal code: 10076 /10200
- ^{1} French Land Register data, which excludes lakes, ponds, glaciers > 1 km^{2} (0.386 sq mi or 247 acres) and river estuaries.

Champignol-lez-Mondeville (French pronunciation: [ʃɑ̃piɲɔl le mɔ̃dvil]) is a commune in the Aube department in north-central France.

== Population ==
Historical population
Year	Pop.	±% p.a.
1968	393	—
1975	333	−2.34%
1982	331	−0.09%
1990	288	−1.72%
1999	305	+0.64%
2007	339	+1.33%
2012	315	−1.46%
2017	276	−2.61%
2023	260	−0.99%
Source: INSEE

== See also ==
- Communes of the Aube department
