= Voire =

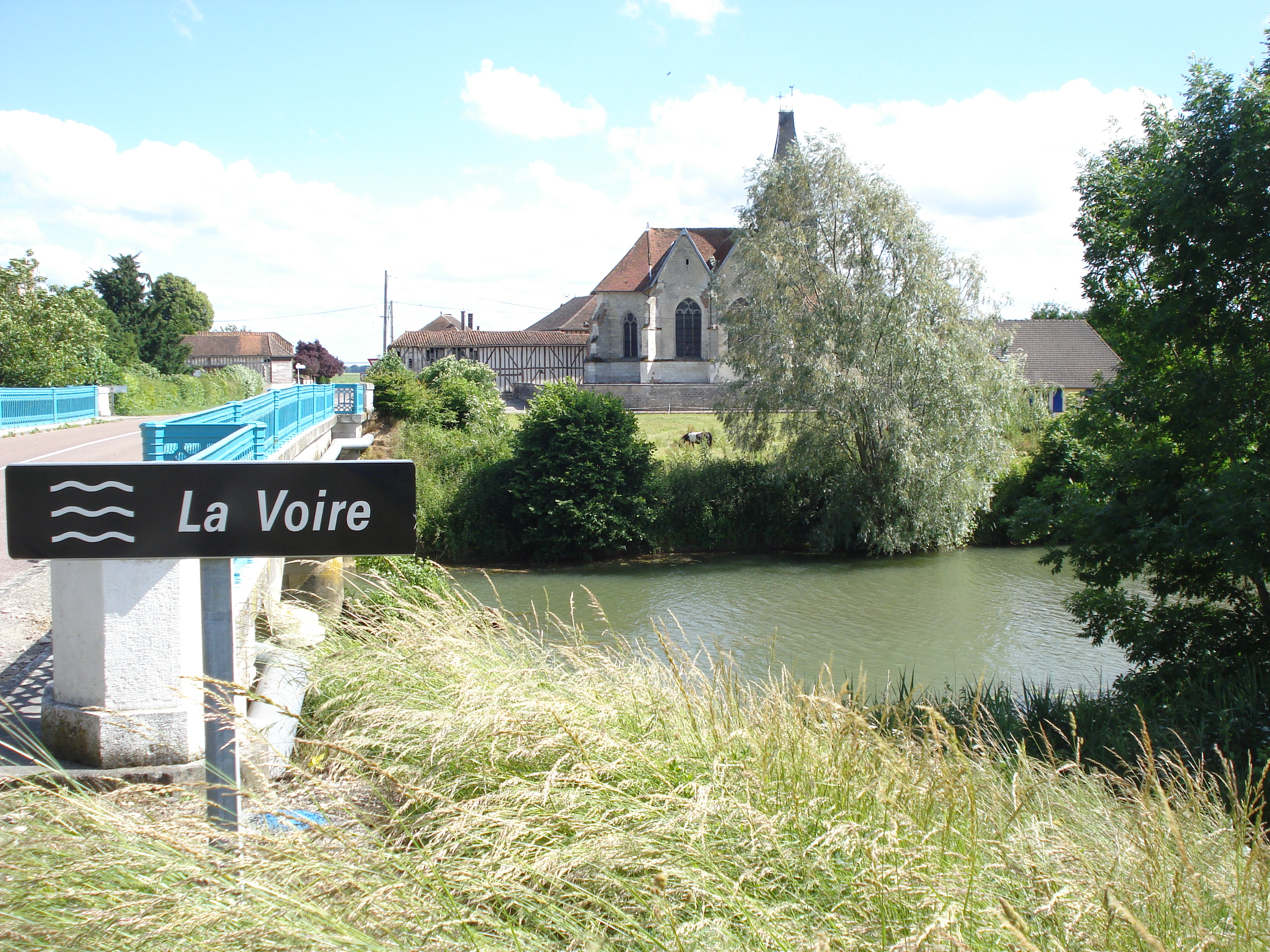

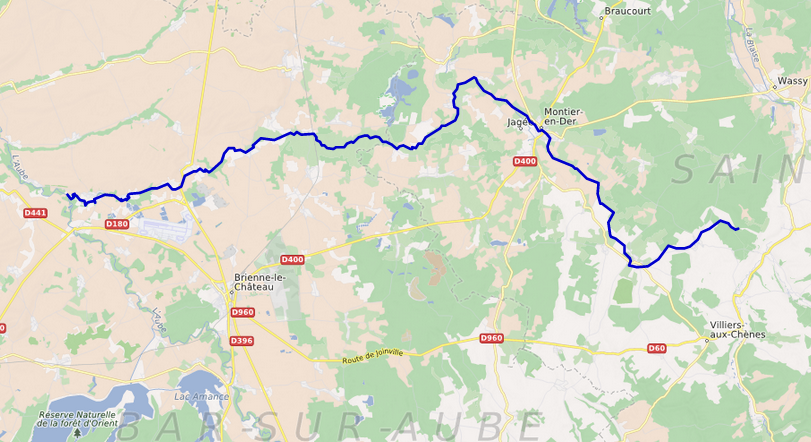

Location
- Country: France

Physical characteristics
- Mouth
  - location: Aube
  - coordinates: 48°26′39″N 4°24′25″E
- Length: 56.2 km (34.9 mi)
- Basin size: 896 km^{2} (346 mi^{2})
- Discharge
  - average: 7.07 m^{3}/s (250 cu ft/s)

Basin features
- Progression: Aube→ Seine→ English Channel

The Voire (French pronunciation: [vwaʁ]) is a small river in France, in the drainage basin of the Seine. It is 56.2 km (34.9 mi) long. Its source is in Mertrud, in the Haute-Marne department. It flows through Montier-en-Der and Puellemontier, and empties into the river Aube at Chalette-sur-Voire, in the Aube department.
