= Droyes =

- Part of Rives Dervoises
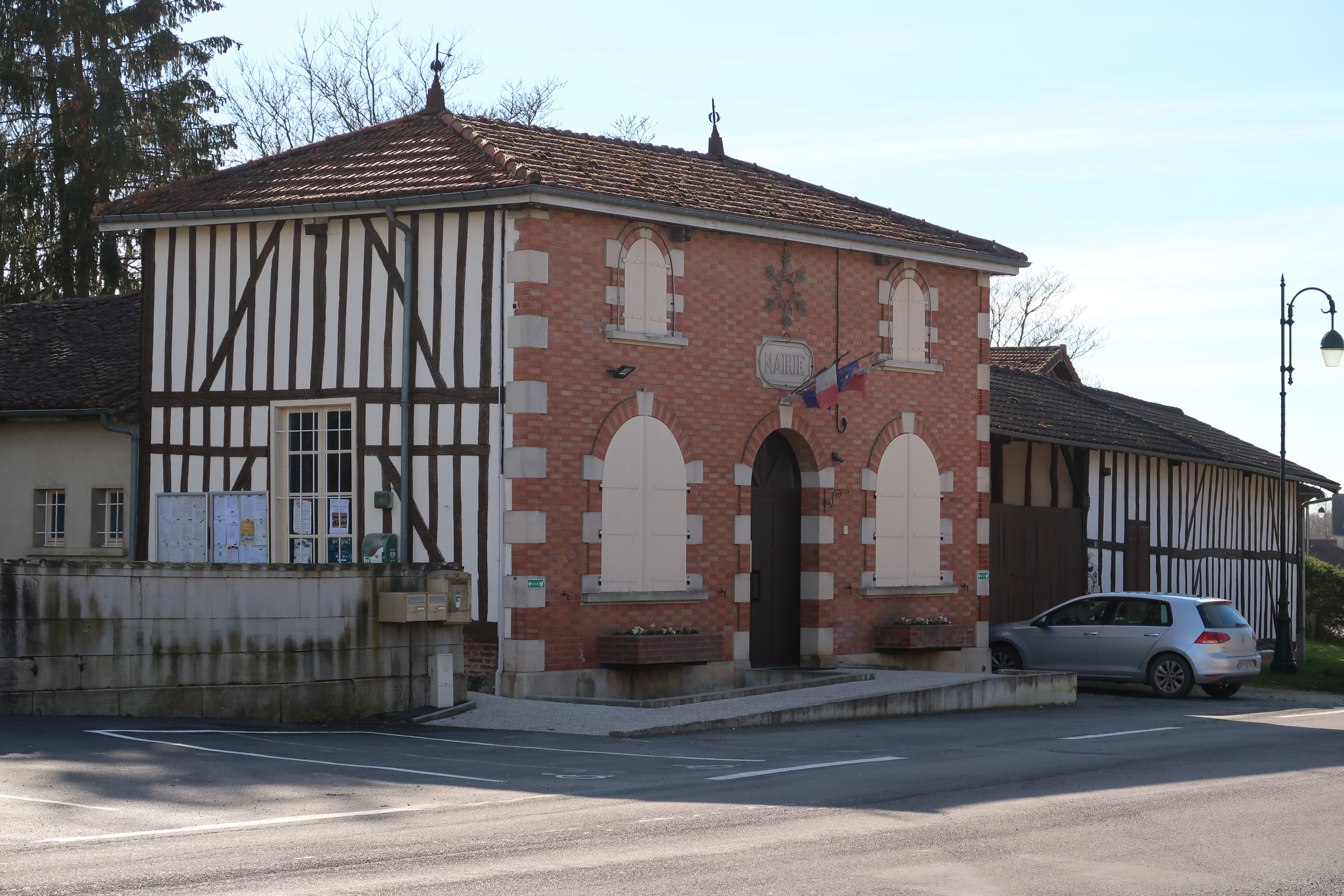
- Town hall
- Location of Droyes
- Location within France Location within Grand Est
- Coordinates: 48°30′46″N 4°41′56″E
- Country: France
- Region: Grand Est
- Department: Haute-Marne
- Arrondissement: Saint-Dizier
- Canton: Wassy
- Commune: Rives Dervoises
- Area^{1}: 25.23 km^{2} (9.74 sq mi)
- Elevation: 117 m (384 ft)
- Highest elevation: 157 m (515 ft)
- Lowest elevation: 118 m (387 ft)
- Population (2022): 418
  - Density: 16.6/km^{2} (42.9/sq mi)
- Time zone: UTC+01:00 (CET)
  - Summer (DST): UTC+02:00 (CEST)
- Postal code: 52220
- ^{1} French Land Register data, which excludes lakes, ponds, glaciers > 1 km^{2} (0.386 sq mi or 247 acres) and river estuaries.

Droyes (French pronunciation: [dʁwa]) is a former commune in the Haute-Marne department in north-eastern France. On 1 January 2016, it was merged into the new commune Rives Dervoises.

== See also ==
- Communes of the Haute-Marne department
