= Jaucourt, Aube =

Commune in Grand Est, France

Jaucourt
- Commune
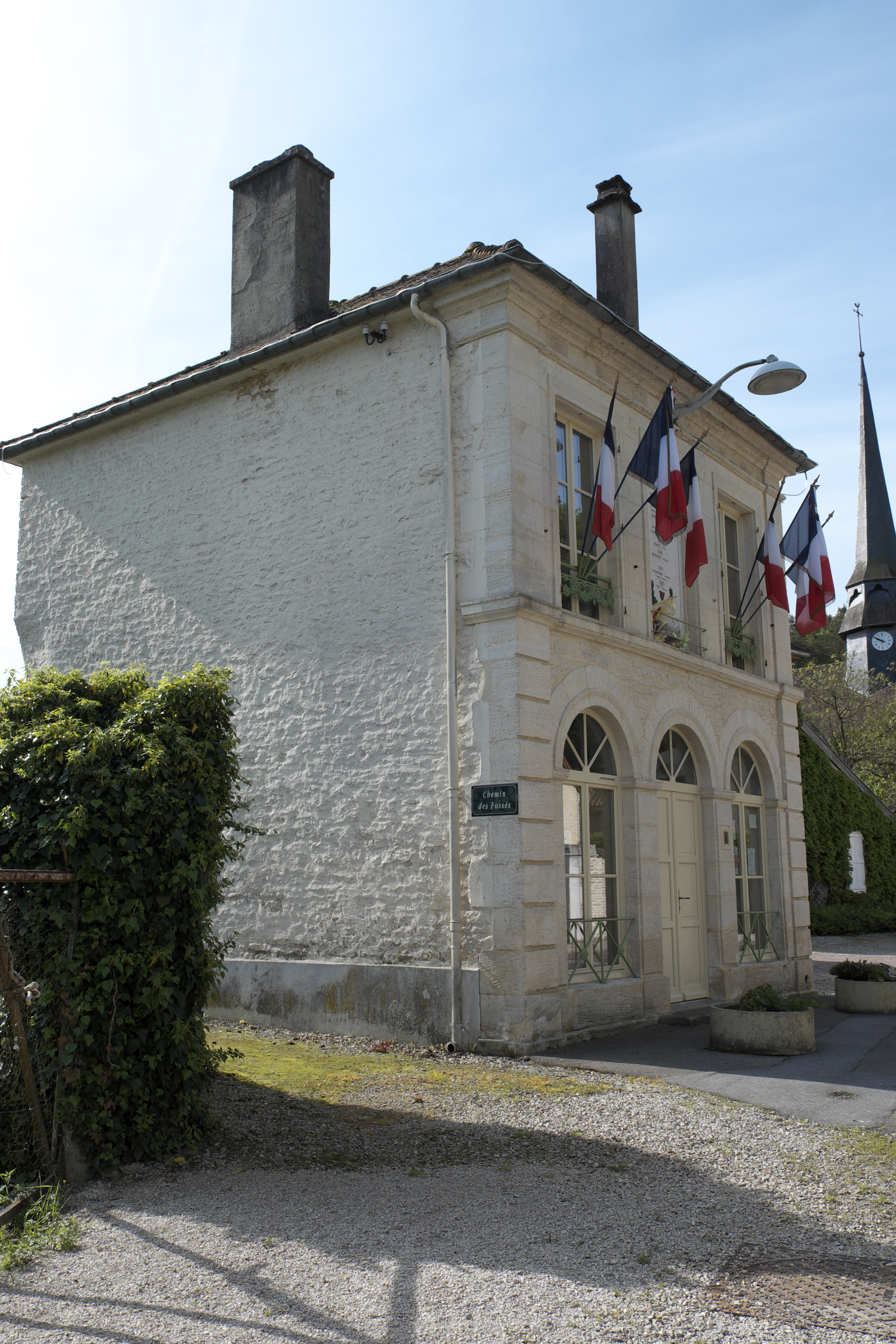
- The town hall in Jaucourt
- Location of Jaucourt
- Location within France Location within Grand Est
- Coordinates: 48°15′36″N 4°38′52″E
- Country: France
- Region: Grand Est
- Department: Aube
- Arrondissement: Bar-sur-Aube
- Canton: Bar-sur-Aube
- Intercommunality: Région de Bar-sur-Aube

Government
  - Mayor (2020–2026): Claudine Hubail
- Area^{1}: 6.61 km^{2} (2.55 sq mi)
- Elevation: 156 m (512 ft)
- Highest elevation: 290 m (950 ft)
- Lowest elevation: 147 m (482 ft)
- Population (2023): 138
  - Density: 20.9/km^{2} (54.1/sq mi)
- Time zone: UTC+01:00 (CET)
  - Summer (DST): UTC+02:00 (CEST)
- INSEE/Postal code: 10176 /10200
- ^{1} French Land Register data, which excludes lakes, ponds, glaciers > 1 km^{2} (0.386 sq mi or 247 acres) and river estuaries.

Jaucourt (French pronunciation: [ʒokuʁ]) is a commune in the Aube department in north-central France.

== History: lordship of Jaucourt ==
Jaucourt was an ancient seigneury or lordship that was sold by Jeanne de Jaucourt to Philip the Bold, duke of Burgundy in 1367. It subsequently passed to the kings of Navarre and Henry IV of France raised it to a barony attached to the Duchy of Beaufort.

== Population ==
Historical population
Year	Pop.	±% p.a.
1968	144	—
1975	128	−1.67%
1982	176	+4.65%
1990	176	+0.00%
1999	171	−0.32%
2007	183	+0.85%
2012	167	−1.81%
2017	166	−0.12%
2023	138	−3.03%
Source: INSEE

== See also ==
- Communes of the Aube department
