= Jasseines =

Commune in Grand Est, France

- Commune
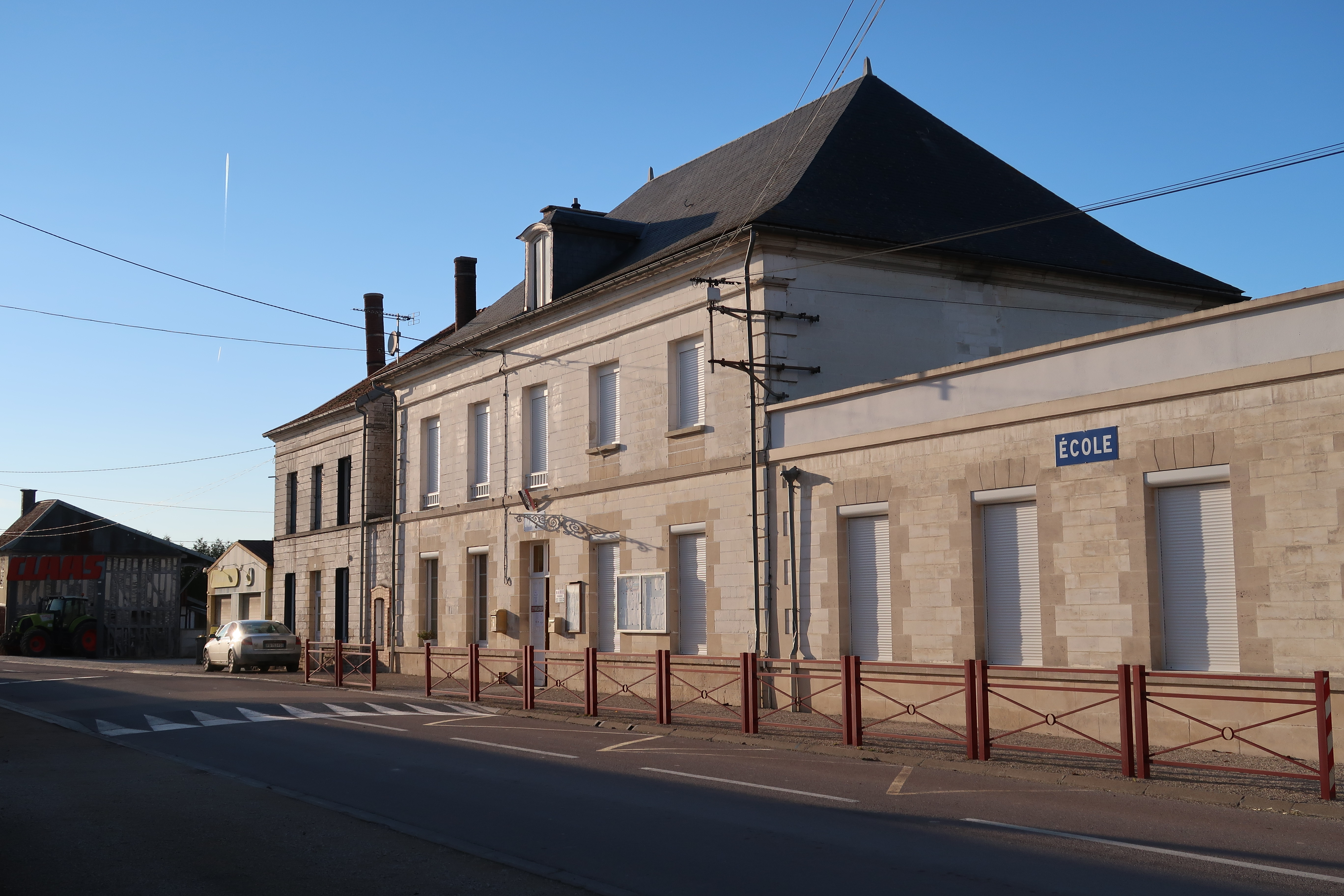
- Town hall
- Location of Jasseines
- Location within France Location within Grand Est
- Coordinates: 48°30′08″N 4°23′17″E
- Country: France
- Region: Grand Est
- Department: Aube
- Arrondissement: Bar-sur-Aube
- Canton: Brienne-le-Château

Government
  - Mayor (2020–2026): Marie-Chantal De Zutter
- Area^{1}: 16.29 km^{2} (6.29 sq mi)
- Elevation: 109 m (358 ft)
- Population (2023): 155
  - Density: 9.52/km^{2} (24.6/sq mi)
- Time zone: UTC+01:00 (CET)
  - Summer (DST): UTC+02:00 (CEST)
- INSEE/Postal code: 10175 /10330
- ^{1} French Land Register data, which excludes lakes, ponds, glaciers > 1 km^{2} (0.386 sq mi or 247 acres) and river estuaries.

Jasseines (French pronunciation: [ʒasɛn]) is a commune in the Aube department in north-central France.

== Population ==
Historical population
Year	Pop.	±% p.a.
1968	186	—
1975	165	−1.70%
1982	158	−0.62%
1990	166	+0.62%
1999	148	−1.27%
2007	152	+0.33%
2012	181	+3.55%
2017	177	−0.45%
2023	155	−2.19%
Source: INSEE

== See also ==
- Communes of the Aube department
