= Chavanges =

Commune in Grand Est, France

- Commune
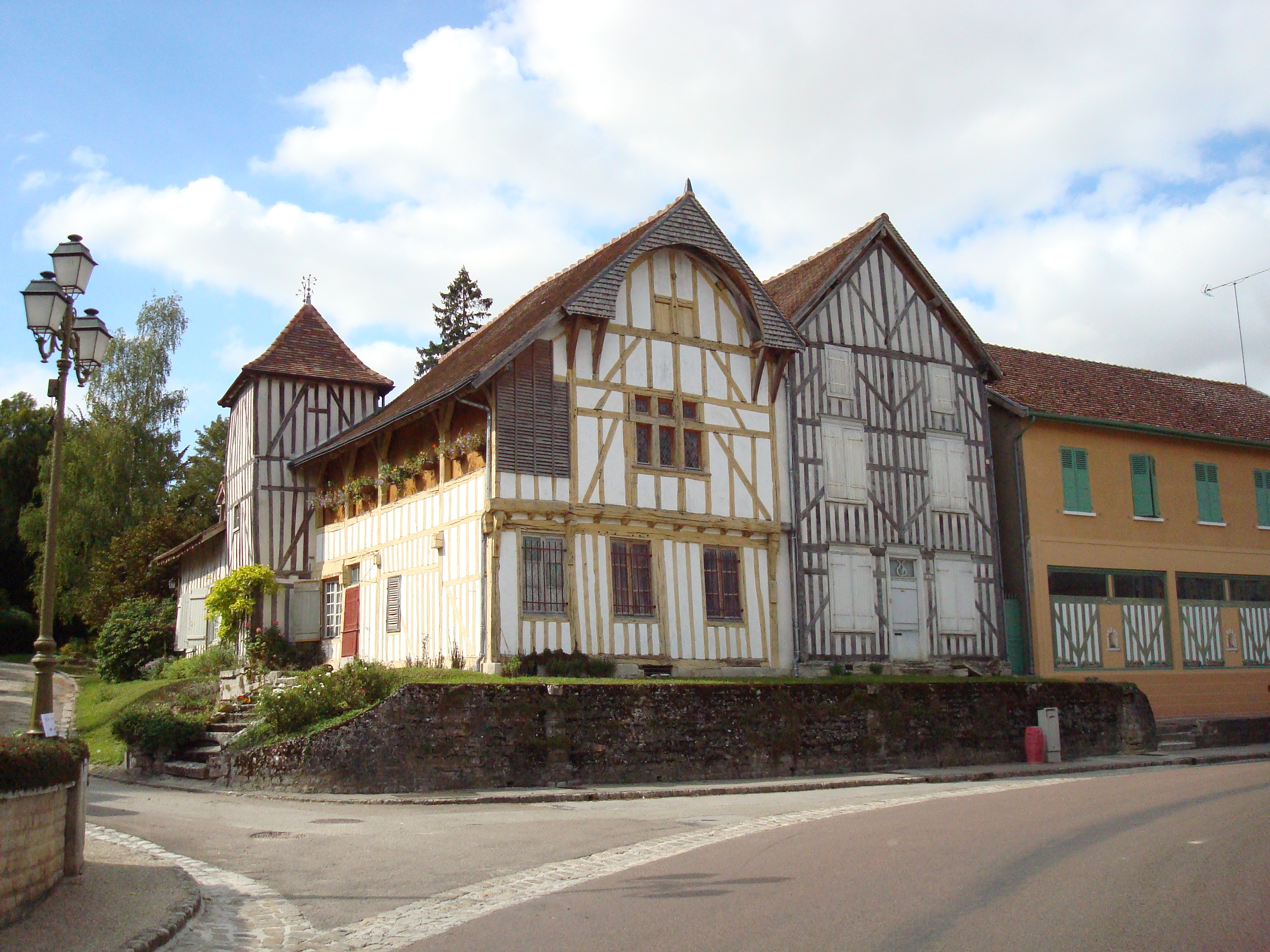
- Houses in Chavanges

- Coat of arms
- Location of Chavanges
- Location within France Location within Grand Est
- Coordinates: 48°30′34″N 4°34′29″E
- Country: France
- Region: Grand Est
- Department: Aube
- Arrondissement: Bar-sur-Aube
- Canton: Brienne-le-Château

Government
  - Mayor (2020–2026): Daniel Chauchefoin
- Area^{1}: 29.79 km^{2} (11.50 sq mi)
- Elevation: 142 m (466 ft)
- Population (2023): 567
  - Density: 19.0/km^{2} (49.3/sq mi)
- Time zone: UTC+01:00 (CET)
  - Summer (DST): UTC+02:00 (CEST)
- INSEE/Postal code: 10094 /10330
- ^{1} French Land Register data, which excludes lakes, ponds, glaciers > 1 km^{2} (0.386 sq mi or 247 acres) and river estuaries.

Chavanges (French pronunciation: [ʃavɑ̃ʒ]) is a commune in the Aube department in north-central France.

== Population ==
Historical population
Year	Pop.	±% p.a.
1968	818	—
1975	721	−1.79%
1982	695	−0.52%
1990	728	+0.58%
1999	689	−0.61%
2007	664	−0.46%
2012	623	−1.27%
2017	591	−1.05%
2023	567	−0.69%
Source: INSEE

== See also ==
- Communes of the Aube department
