= Forêt d'Orient National Nature Reserve =

Protected area in France

- IUCN category IV (habitat/species management area)
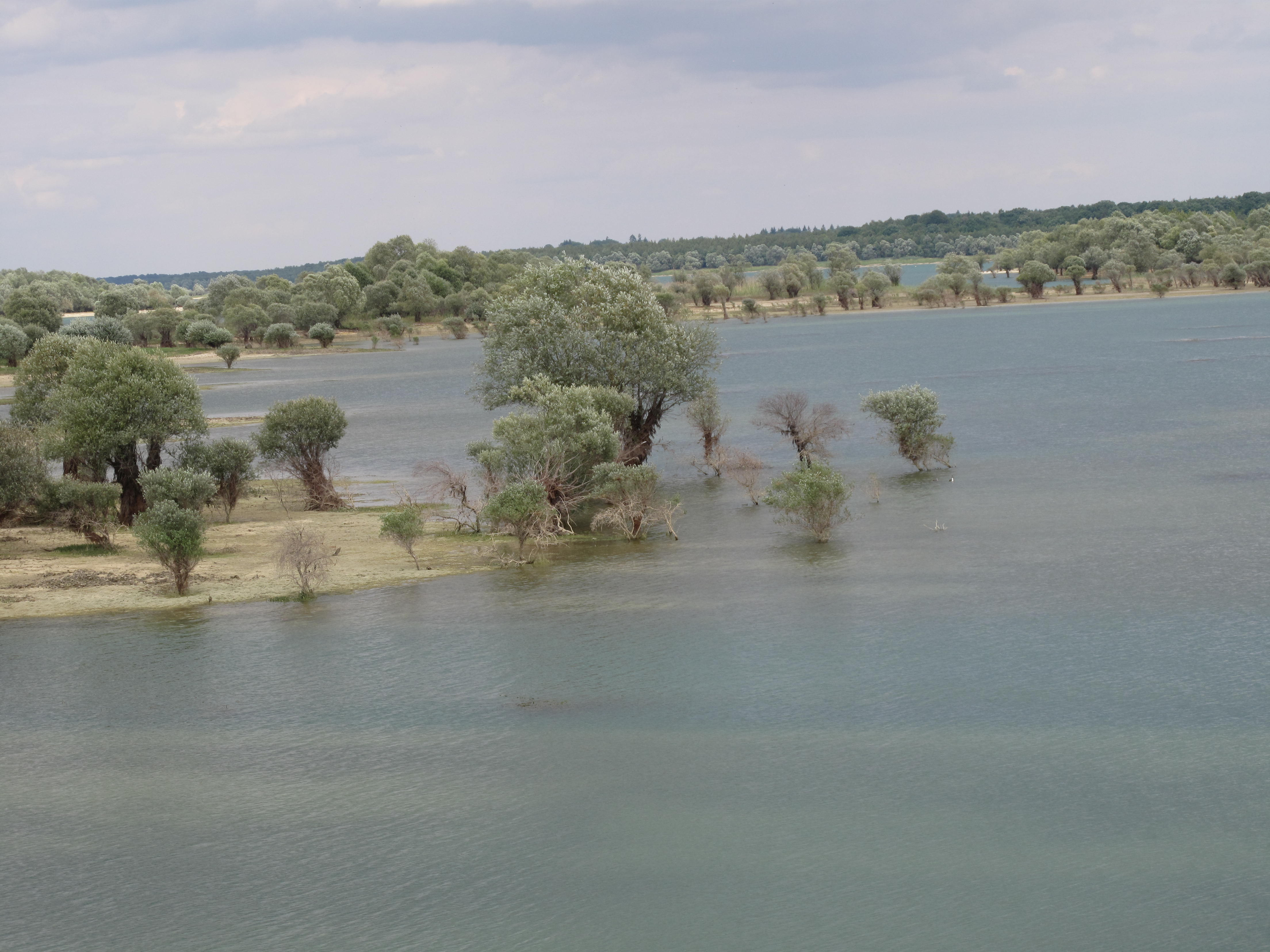
- Temple Lake
- Interactive map of Forêt d'Orient National Nature Reserve
- Location: Radonvilliers, France
- Nearest city: Troyes
- Coordinates: 48°19′12″N 4°23′48″E
- Area: 1,560 ha (3,900 acres)
- Established: July 9, 2002
- Governing body: Orient Forest Regional Natural Park

The Forêt d'Orient (Orient Forest) National Nature Reserve (RNN154) is a national nature reserve located in Champagne-Ardenne in the Grand Est region in France. Located within the Orient Forest Regional Natural Park, it was created in 2002 and protects 1,560 hectares of lake and forest areas.

== Localisation ==
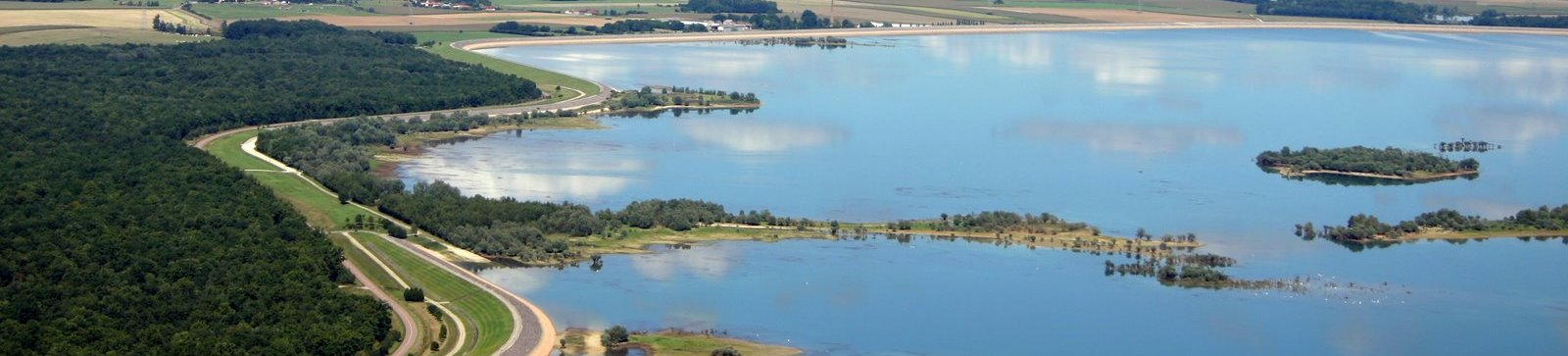
Temple Lake.

The territory of the nature reserve is located in Aube department in communes of Amance, Brévonnes, Mathaux, Piney and Radonvilliers within Orient Forest Regional Natural Park and 25 km east of Troyes. It includes part of the Orient, Amance and Temple lakes.

== History of site and reserve ==
The Great Seine Lakes were created from the 1960s to protect Paris from floods. Their completion in the 1990s allowed the establishment of peripheral natural environments linked to their presence. The protection of these environments was ensured by the creation of the nature reserve in 2002.

== Ecology (biodiversity, ecological interest, etc.) ==
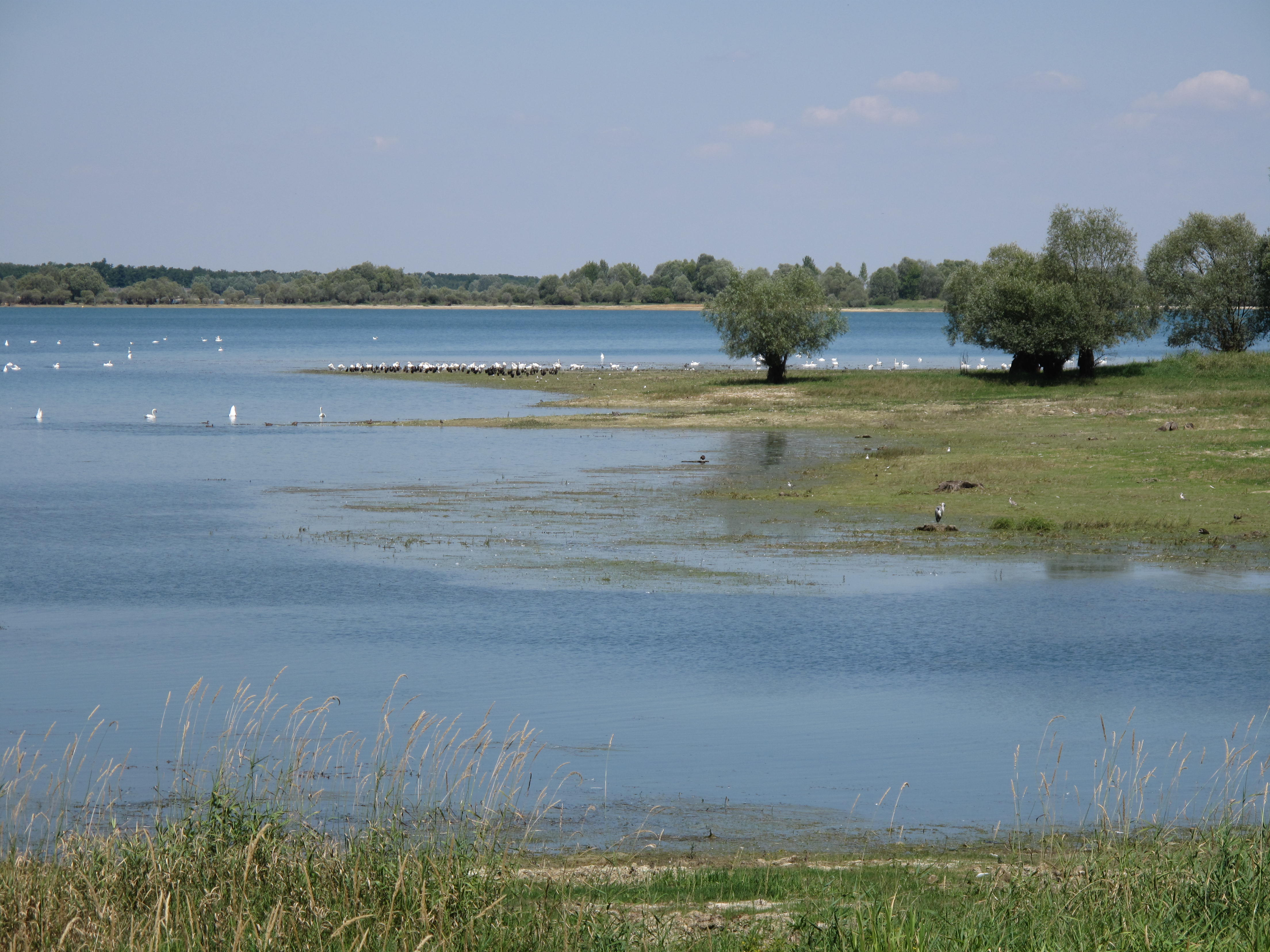
View of Temple Lake from Valois observatory.

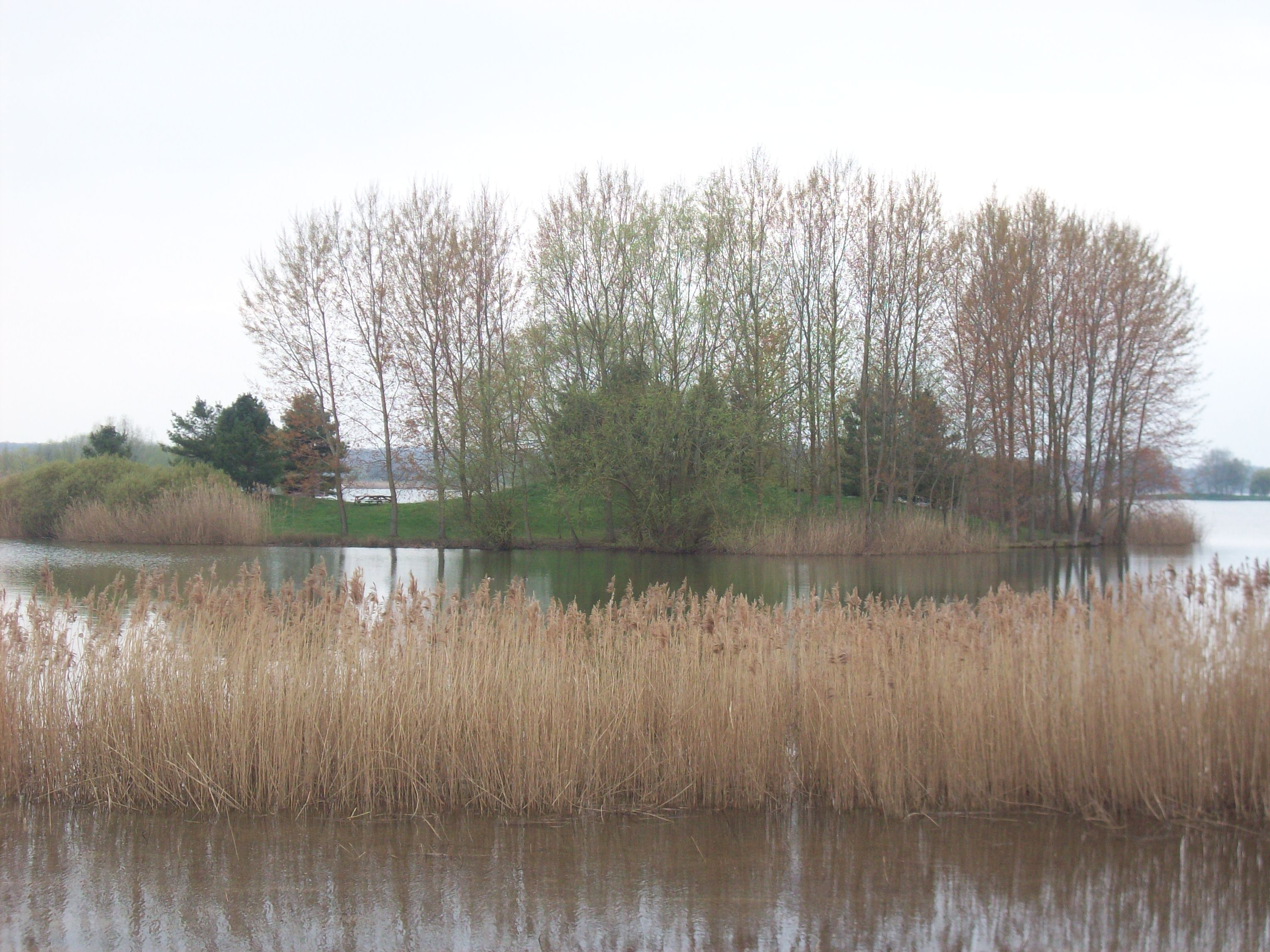
Reed beds at Lake Amance.

The interest in the site arises from its location on the migratory routes of several species of waterbirds. There are three main types of environment:

- lake environments with a fluctuating water level which generates areas of mudflats;
- grassland environments positioned according to their humidity (meadows, reed beds);
- forest environments made up of oaks and hornbeams.

This combination creates very varied habitats.

=== Flora ===
The variations in the water level of the lakes, and the areas of mudflats that result from them, generate very rich environments sheltering an aquatic flora. There are remarkable species such as Ranunculus lingua and Pulicaria vulgaris.

=== Wildlife ===
There are around 40 species of mammals frequenting the site. There are also 24 heritage species, including 16 species of bats. Protected species include the wildcat, polecat (Mustela putorius putorius), barbastella as well as the Eurasian otter.

The site is known for its bird life linked to aquatic or forest environments. It has more than 200 species, 92 of which are nesting. Among migratory species, we find the black stork, greater white-fronted and greylag geese, Bewick's swan (Cygnus columbianus bewickii), Eurasian teal, common goldeneye, smew, etc.

Amphibians include the yellow-bellied toad, the fire salamander, and the Northern crested newt. Three heritage species of reptile are present: the grass snake, the slow-worm and the viviparous lizard.

The site is very rich in beetles (800 inventoried species) and dragonflies.

== Touristic and educational interest ==
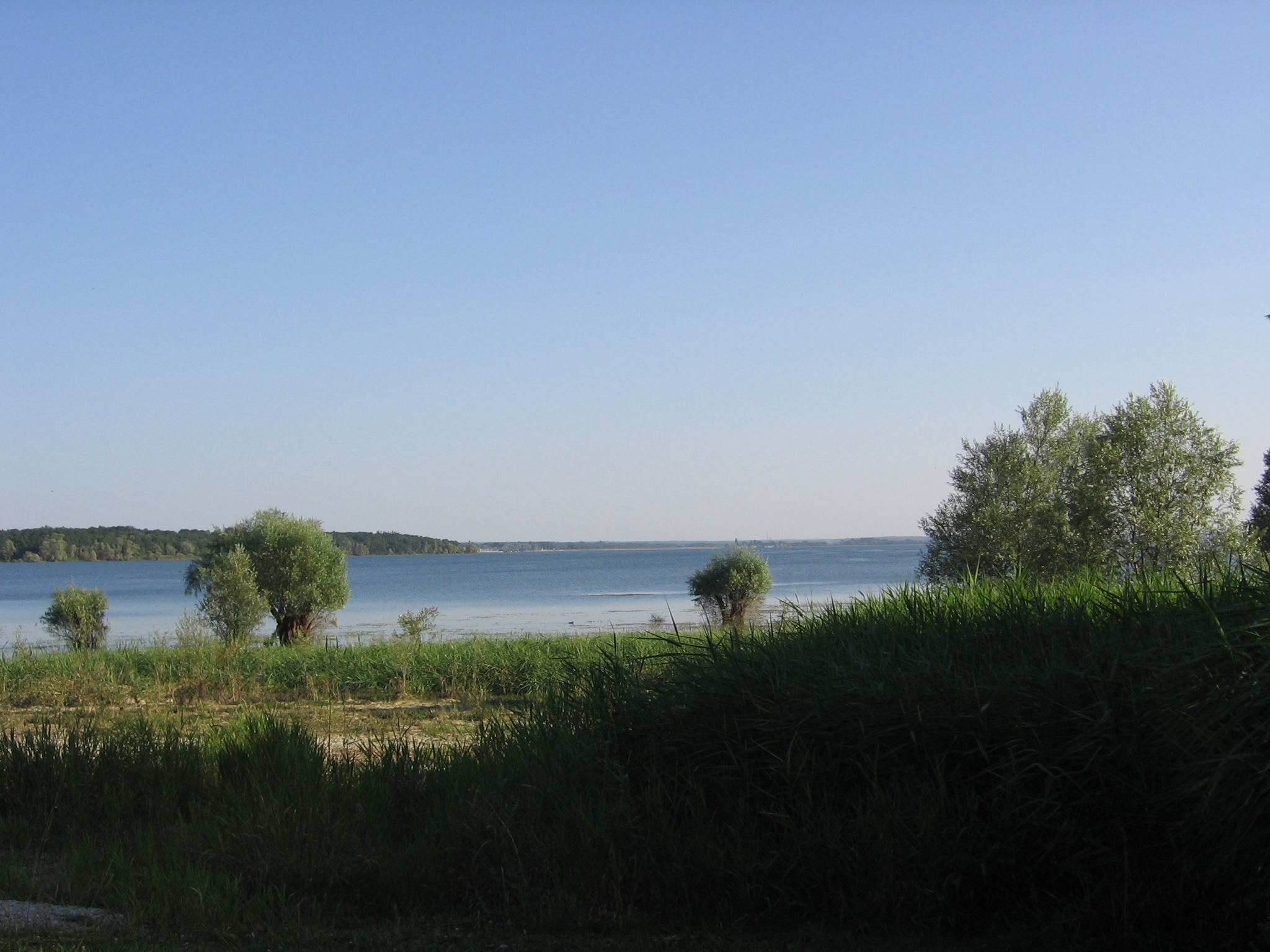
Orient Lake.

The interior of the nature reserve is closed to the public. Sites on the outskirts, such as the Valois observatory, allow visitors to observe the flora and fauna without disturbing them. Trips to the periphery of the reserve as well as articles published in various journals also allow the public to learn about the actions carried out on the reserve. At Maison du Parc, video cameras installed on the site allow visitors to experience the highlights of the reserve

== Administration, management plan, regulations ==
The nature reserve is managed by the Orient Forest Regional Natural Park.

=== Legal bases and status ===
The nature reserve was created by a decree of July 9, 2002. Its territory also forms part of the following zonings:

- Zone Ramsar No. 5 "Etangs de la Champagne humide",
- ZICO no. CA02,
- ZNIEFF de type I No. 00639 et de type II No. 00640,
- ZPS "Lacs de la Forêt d'Orient",
- ZSC "Forêt d'Orient".
