= Lac d'Orient =

Lac d'Orient may refer to:

- artificial lake within Orient Forest Regional Natural Park in France
- a minor planet named for the French lake, see Meanings of minor planet names: 4001–5000#943
