= Assencières =

Commune in Grand Est, France

- Commune
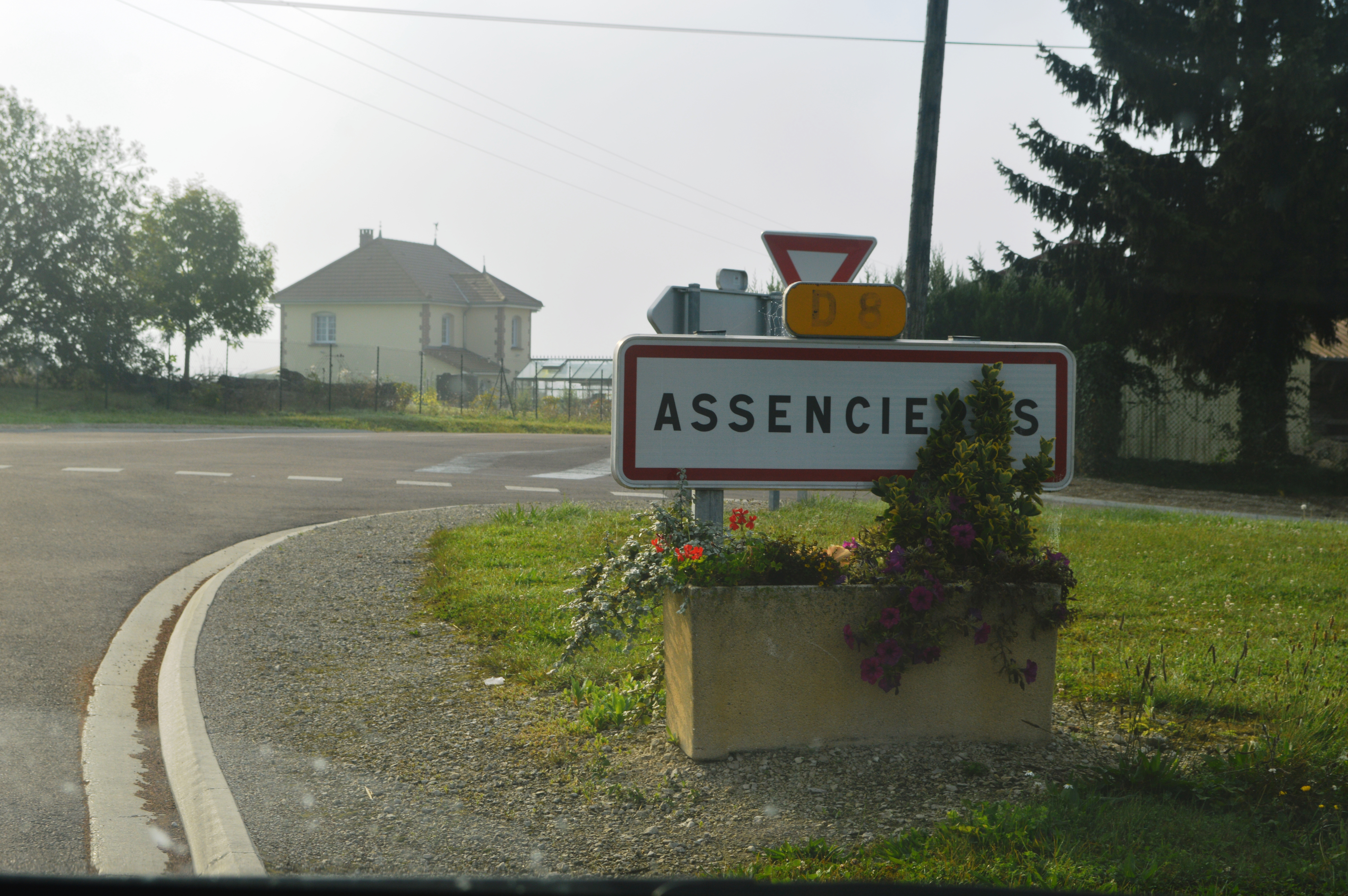
- The road into Assencières

- Coat of arms
- Location of Assencières
- Location within France Location within Grand Est
- Coordinates: 48°21′32″N 4°11′59″E
- Country: France
- Region: Grand Est
- Department: Aube
- Arrondissement: Troyes
- Canton: Brienne-le-Château
- Intercommunality: CC Forêts Lacs Terres Champagne

Government
  - Mayor (2020–2026): Jean-Louis Pinet
- Area^{1}: 7.39 km^{2} (2.85 sq mi)
- Elevation: 164 m (538 ft)
- Population (2023): 190
  - Density: 26/km^{2} (67/sq mi)
- Time zone: UTC+01:00 (CET)
  - Summer (DST): UTC+02:00 (CEST)
- INSEE/Postal code: 10014 /10220
- ^{1} French Land Register data, which excludes lakes, ponds, glaciers > 1 km^{2} (0.386 sq mi or 247 acres) and river estuaries.

Assencières (French pronunciation: [asɑ̃sjɛʁ]) is a commune in the Aube department in the Grand Est region of north-central France.

== Geography ==
Assencières is located some 11 km north-east of Troyes and 8 km south-east of Charmont-sous-Barbuise. Access to the commune is by the D 8 road from Luyères in the north passing through the village and the heart of the commune and continuing to Mesnil-Sellières in the south. The D 100 also starts from the village and goes north-east to Bouy-Luxembourg. There is a railway passing through the commune from Charmont-sous-Barbuise in the north to La Chapelle-Saint-Luc in the south-west but there is no station in or near the commune. The commune is entirely flat farmland.

== Administration ==
List of Successive Mayors

From	To	Name	Party	Position
/1857		Briet-Baulard		
/1887		Derrez		
2001	2008	Gérard Leclercq		
2008		Jean-Louis Pinet		
2014	2020	Christophe Gravelat		
2020	2026	Jean-Louis Pinet		
15 March 2026		Jean-Louis Pinet		

== Demography ==
Historical population

Year	Pop.	±% p.a.
1793	176	—
1821	157	−0.41%
1846	134	−0.63%
1872	112	−0.69%
1901	78	−1.24%
1926	87	+0.44%
1946	77	−0.61%
1962	68	−0.77%
1968	73	+1.19%

Year	Pop.	±% p.a.
1975	85	+2.20%
1982	89	+0.66%
1990	106	+2.21%
1999	145	+3.54%
2007	170	+2.01%
2012	204	+3.71%
2017	171	−3.47%
2023	190	+1.77%

Source: EHESS and INSEE

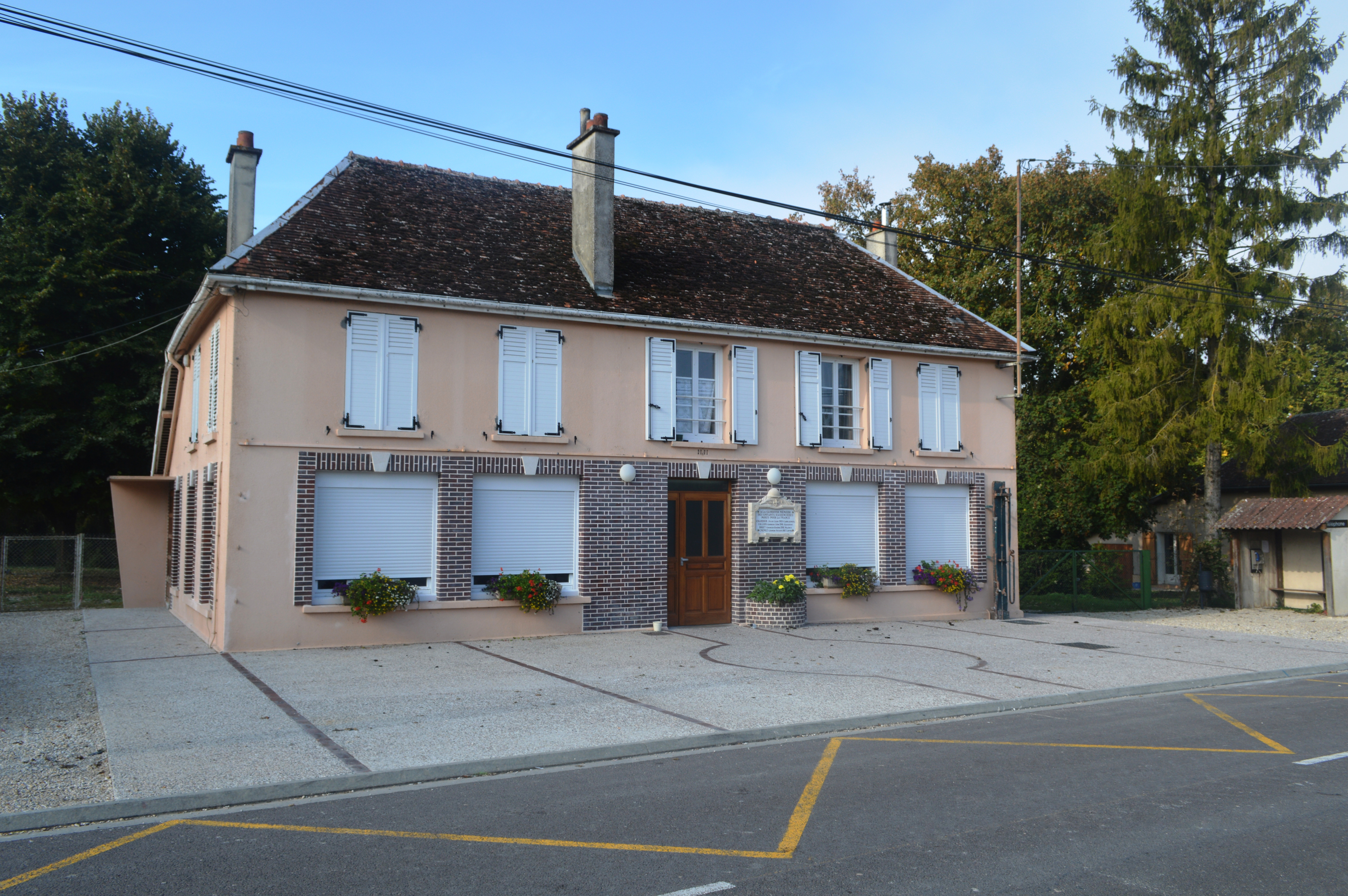
The Town Hall

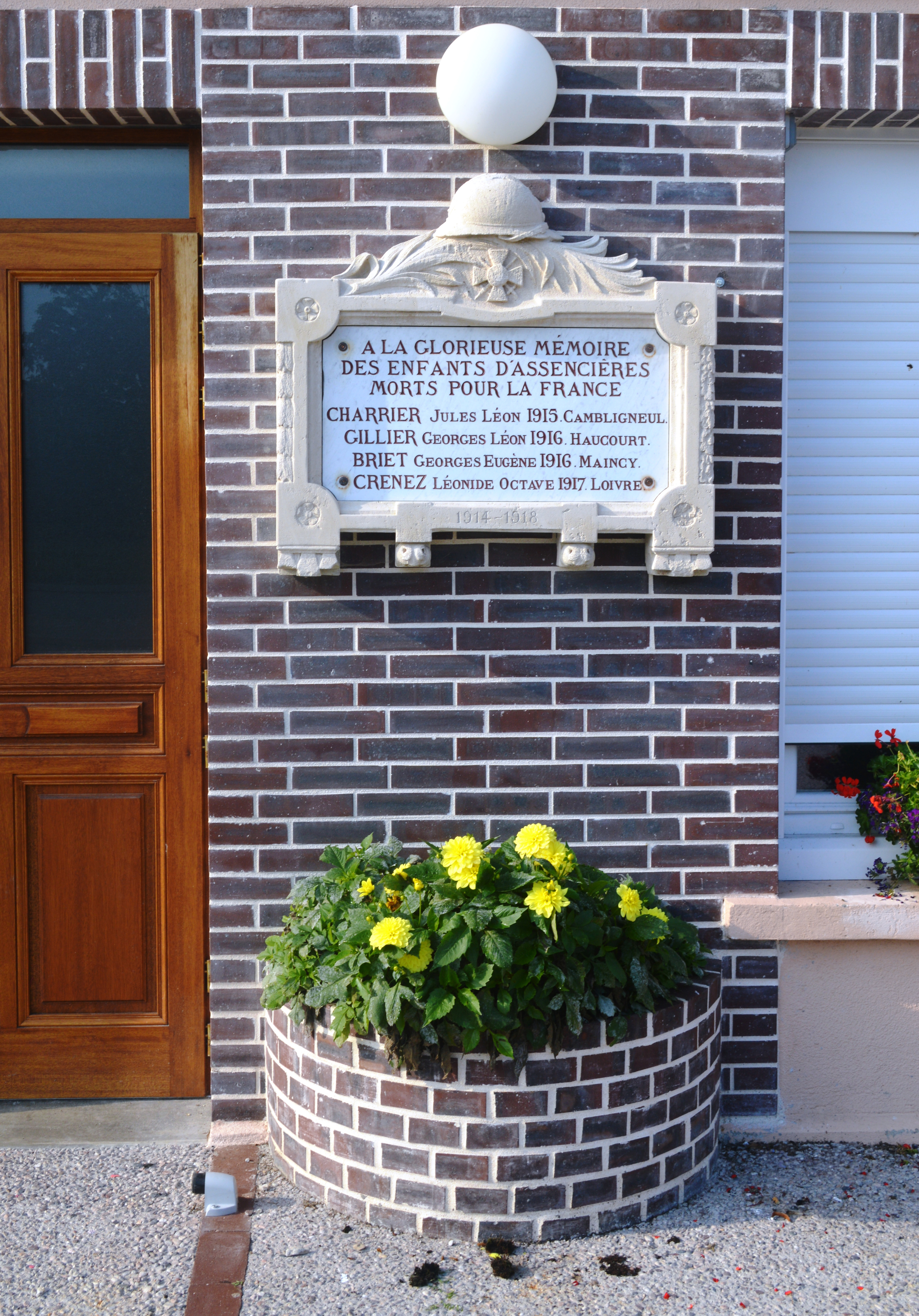
Assencières War Memorial

== Sites and monuments ==
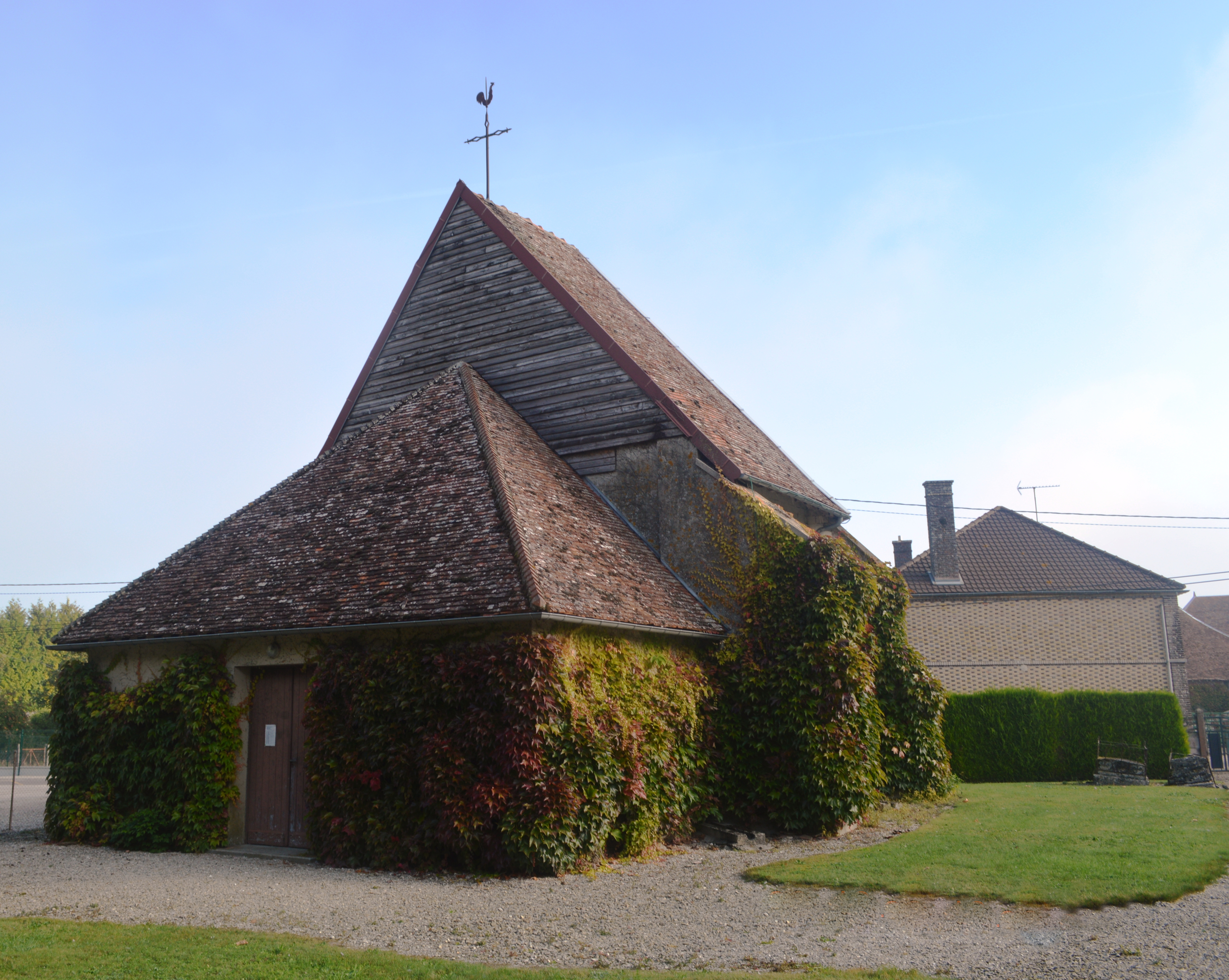
The Church of Saint Pierre and Saint Paul

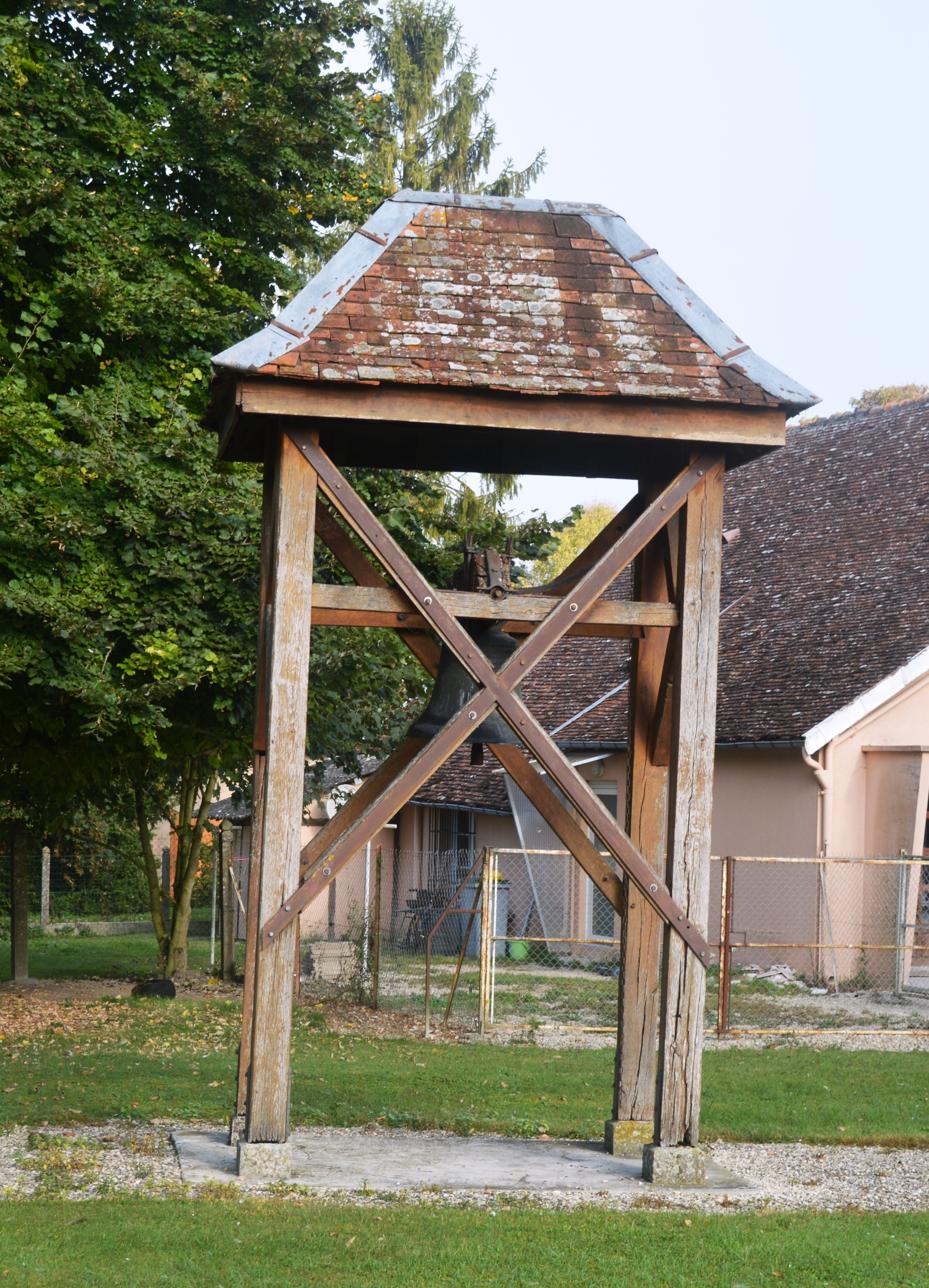
The Bronze Bell

The Church of Saint-Pierre and Saint-Paul used to have three naves from the 16th century which collapsed in 1947. There are many items which are registered as historical objects:

- Stoup (17th century)
- Sculpture: Christ on the cross (19th century)
- Main Altar, Tabernacle, and Retable (18th century)
- Retable star (18th century)
- Statue: Saint-Pierre (16th century)
- Statue: Saint-Fiacre (16th century)
- Processional cross (17th century)
- Group Sculpture: Christ & 2 angels with the instruments of the Passion (16th century)
- Stained glass windows: Death of the Virgin (16th century)
- Statue: Virgin & child (16th century)
- Stained glass windows: Visitation of Saint-Pierre (16th century)
- Reliquary-bust: Saint-Fiacre (18th century)
- Bronze Bell (17th century)
- Choir balustrade (18th century)
- Stained glass window: the Crucifixion (16th century)
- Glass figure in Bay 2 (15th century)
- Glass figure in Bay 0 (15th century)

== Notable people linked to the commune ==
Alexandre Marchais, who was called Le Mose, was born in 1962 and spent his childhood in Assencières. He made his first steps in performing at parties before turning to street music and eventually join a travelling troupe of acrobats. But it was in the gypsy community that he is known by becoming one of the leading exponents of ericius music.

== See also ==
- Communes of the Aube department
- Parc naturel régional de la Forêt d'Orient
