= La Villeneuve-au-Chêne =

Commune in Grand Est, France

- Commune
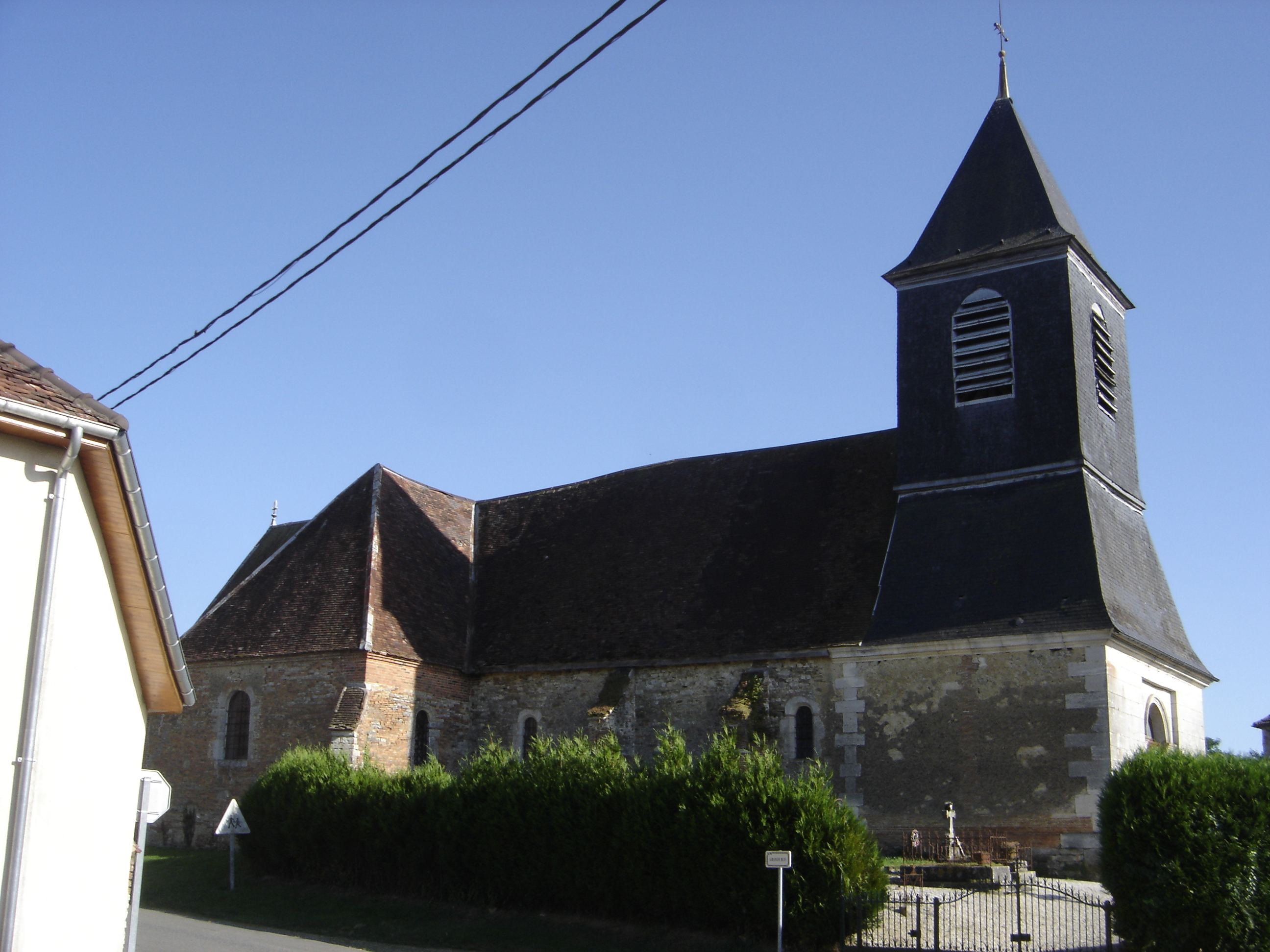
- The church in La Villeneuve-au-Chêne
- Location of La Villeneuve-au-Chêne
- Location within France Location within Grand Est
- Coordinates: 48°14′23″N 4°23′23″E
- Country: France
- Region: Grand Est
- Department: Aube
- Arrondissement: Bar-sur-Aube
- Canton: Vendeuvre-sur-Barse

Government
  - Mayor (2020–2026): Jésus Cervantes
- Area^{1}: 10.94 km^{2} (4.22 sq mi)
- Elevation: 167 m (548 ft)
- Population (2023): 405
  - Density: 37.0/km^{2} (95.9/sq mi)
- Time zone: UTC+01:00 (CET)
  - Summer (DST): UTC+02:00 (CEST)
- INSEE/Postal code: 10423 /10140
- ^{1} French Land Register data, which excludes lakes, ponds, glaciers > 1 km^{2} (0.386 sq mi or 247 acres) and river estuaries.

La Villeneuve-au-Chêne (French pronunciation: [la vilnœv o ʃɛːn]) is a commune in the Aube department in north-central France.

== Geography ==
The Barse flows through the commune.

== Population ==
Historical population
| Year | Pop. | ±% p.a. |
|---|---|---|
| 1968 | 414 | — |
| 1975 | 391 | −0.81% |
| 1982 | 404 | +0.47% |
| 1990 | 429 | +0.75% |
| 1999 | 413 | −0.42% |
| 2007 | 426 | +0.39% |
| 2012 | 449 | +1.06% |
| 2017 | 424 | −1.14% |
| 2023 | 405 | −0.76% |
Source: INSEE

== See also ==
- Communes of the Aube department
