= Montiéramey =

Commune in Grand Est, France

- Commune
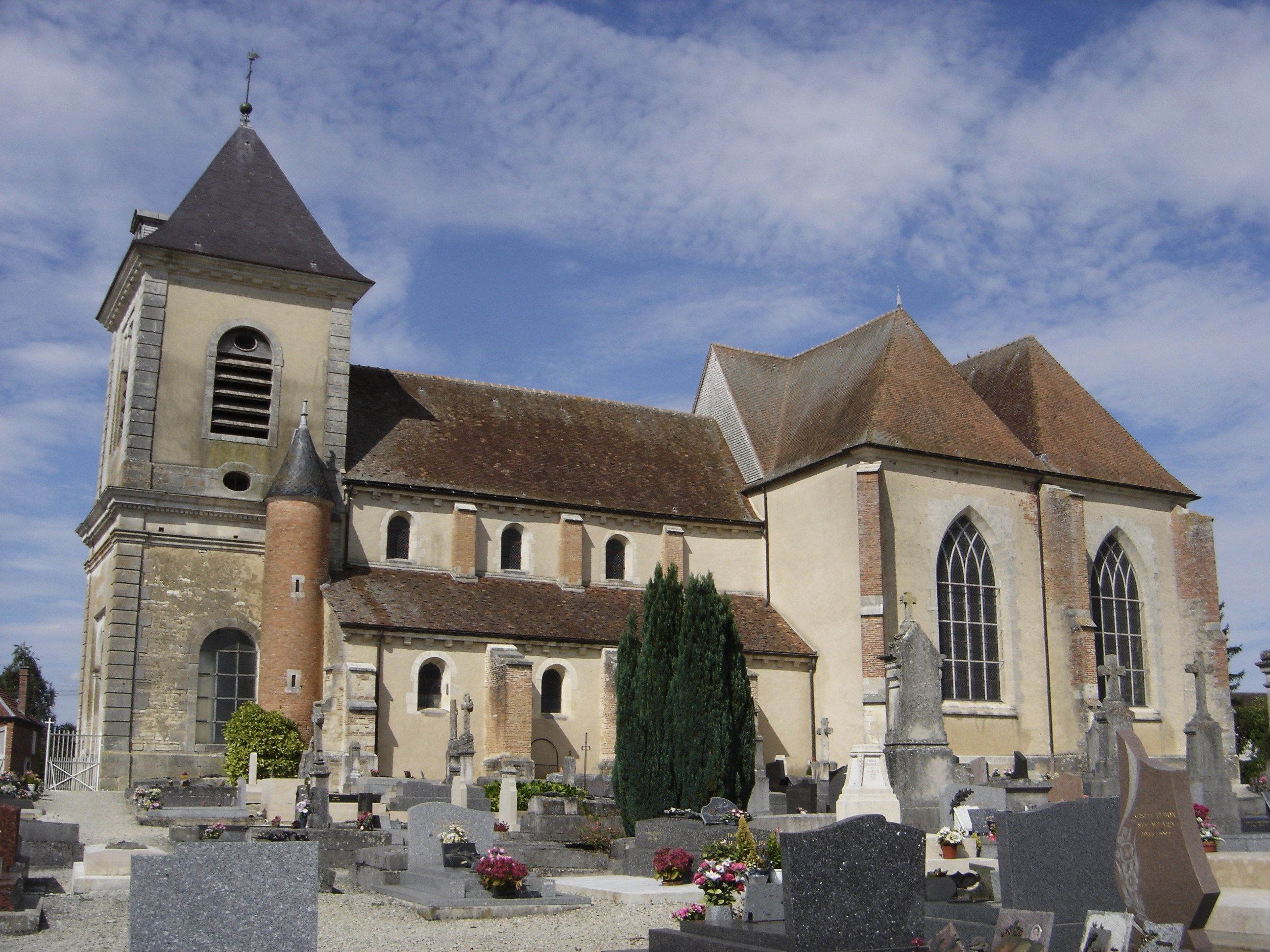
- The church in Montiéramey

- Coat of arms
- Location of Montiéramey
- Location within France Location within Grand Est
- Coordinates: 48°13′53″N 4°18′24″E
- Country: France
- Region: Grand Est
- Department: Aube
- Arrondissement: Troyes
- Canton: Vendeuvre-sur-Barse
- Intercommunality: CA Troyes Champagne Métropole

Government
  - Mayor (2020–2026): Boris Driat
- Area^{1}: 6.73 km^{2} (2.60 sq mi)
- Elevation: 138 m (453 ft)
- Population (2023): 398
  - Density: 59.1/km^{2} (153/sq mi)
- Time zone: UTC+01:00 (CET)
  - Summer (DST): UTC+02:00 (CEST)
- INSEE/Postal code: 10249 /10270
- ^{1} French Land Register data, which excludes lakes, ponds, glaciers > 1 km^{2} (0.386 sq mi or 247 acres) and river estuaries.

Montiéramey (French pronunciation: [mɔ̃tjeʁamɛ]) is a commune in the Aube department in north-central France.

== Geography ==
The Barse flows through the commune.

== Population ==
Historical population
Year	Pop.	±% p.a.
1968	451	—
1975	404	−1.56%
1982	391	−0.47%
1990	351	−1.34%
1999	405	+1.60%
2007	452	+1.38%
2012	430	−0.99%
2017	403	−1.29%
2023	398	−0.21%
Source: INSEE

== See also ==
- Communes of the Aube department
- Parc naturel régional de la Forêt d'Orient
