= Rouilly-Saint-Loup =

Commune in Grand Est, France

- Commune
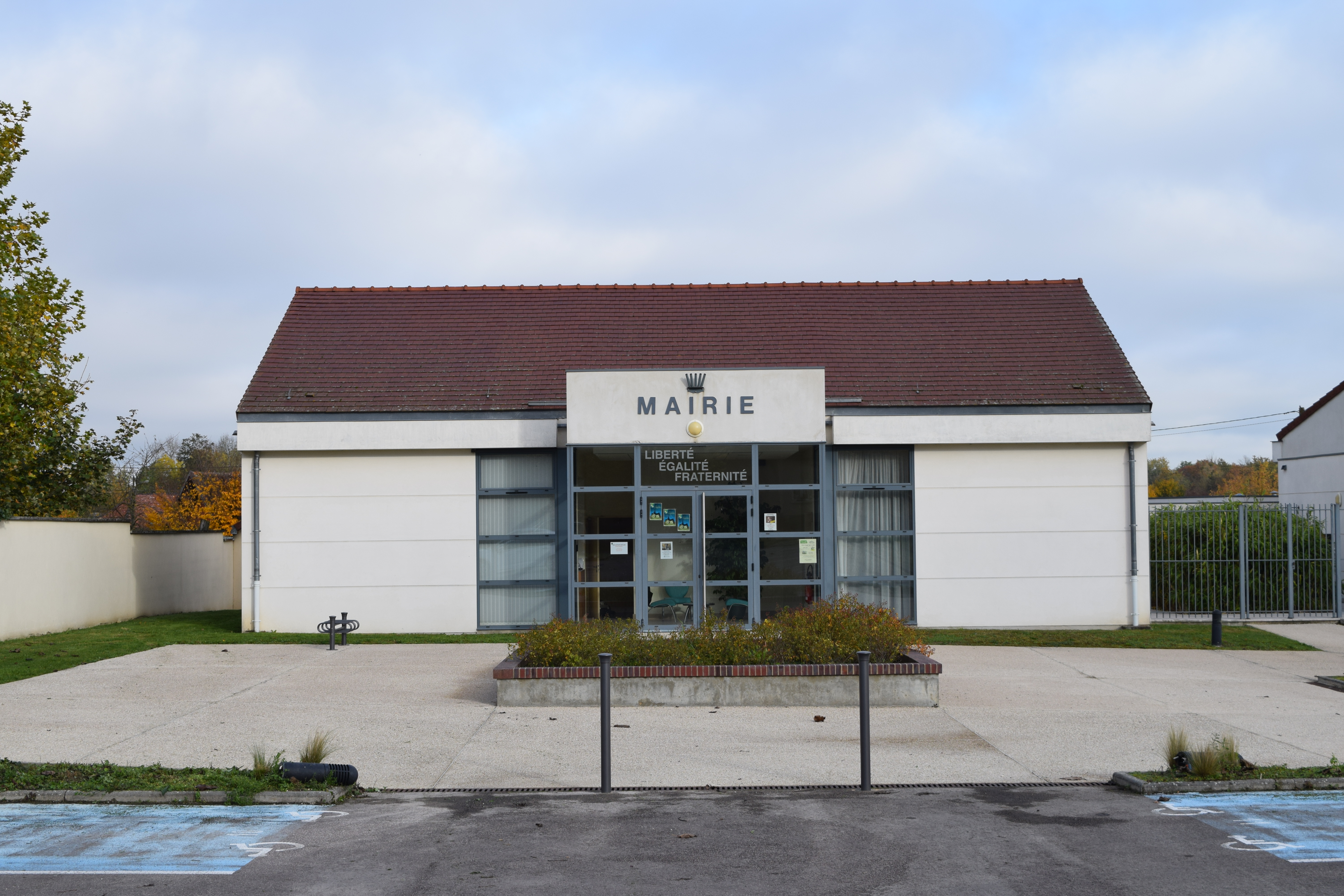
- The town hall in Rouilly-Saint-Loup

- Coat of arms
- Location of Rouilly-Saint-Loup
- Location within France Location within Grand Est
- Coordinates: 48°15′48″N 4°09′04″E
- Country: France
- Region: Grand Est
- Department: Aube
- Arrondissement: Troyes
- Canton: Vendeuvre-sur-Barse
- Intercommunality: CA Troyes Champagne Métropole

Government
  - Mayor (2020–2026): Jean-Marie Castex
- Area^{1}: 11.26 km^{2} (4.35 sq mi)
- Elevation: 112 m (367 ft)
- Population (2023): 541
  - Density: 48.0/km^{2} (124/sq mi)
- Time zone: UTC+01:00 (CET)
  - Summer (DST): UTC+02:00 (CEST)
- INSEE/Postal code: 10329 /10800
- ^{1} French Land Register data, which excludes lakes, ponds, glaciers > 1 km^{2} (0.386 sq mi or 247 acres) and river estuaries.

Rouilly-Saint-Loup (French pronunciation: [ʁuji sɛ̃ lu]) is a commune in the Aube department in north-central France.

== Population ==
Historical population
Year	Pop.	±% p.a.
1968	361	—
1975	379	+0.70%
1982	480	+3.43%
1990	507	+0.69%
1999	505	−0.04%
2007	534	+0.70%
2012	562	+1.03%
2017	517	−1.66%
2023	541	+0.76%
Source: INSEE

== Geography ==
The Barse flows through the commune.

== See also ==
- Communes of the Aube department
