= Courteranges =

Commune in Grand Est, France

- Commune
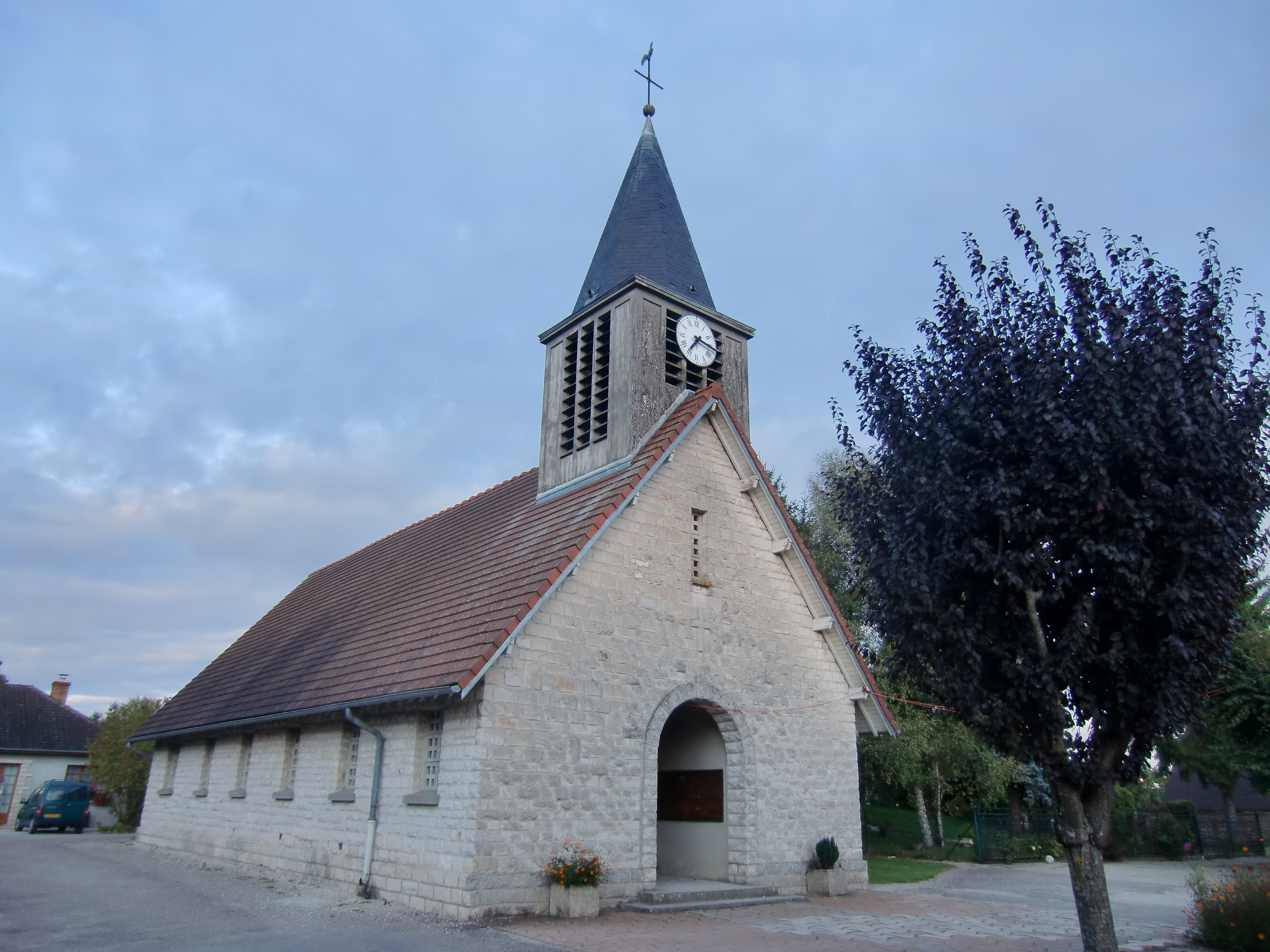
- The church in Courteranges

- Coat of arms
- Location of Courteranges
- Location within France Location within Grand Est
- Coordinates: 48°16′07″N 4°14′22″E
- Country: France
- Region: Grand Est
- Department: Aube
- Arrondissement: Troyes
- Canton: Vendeuvre-sur-Barse
- Intercommunality: CA Troyes Champagne Métropole

Government
  - Mayor (2020–2026): Fabien Gerard
- Area^{1}: 6.47 km^{2} (2.50 sq mi)
- Elevation: 122 m (400 ft)
- Population (2023): 594
  - Density: 91.8/km^{2} (238/sq mi)
- Time zone: UTC+01:00 (CET)
  - Summer (DST): UTC+02:00 (CEST)
- INSEE/Postal code: 10110 /10270
- ^{1} French Land Register data, which excludes lakes, ponds, glaciers > 1 km^{2} (0.386 sq mi or 247 acres) and river estuaries.

Courteranges (French pronunciation: [kuʁtəʁɑ̃ʒ]) is a commune in the Aube department in north-central France.

== Geography ==
The Barse flows through the commune.

== Population ==
Historical population
Year	Pop.	±% p.a.
1968	174	—
1975	202	+2.15%
1982	273	+4.40%
1990	295	+0.97%
1999	425	+4.14%
2007	578	+3.92%
2012	580	+0.07%
2017	570	−0.35%
2023	594	+0.69%
Source: INSEE

== See also ==
- Communes of the Aube department
- List of medieval bridges in France
- Parc naturel régional de la Forêt d'Orient
