= Vendeuvre-sur-Barse =

Commune in Grand Est, France

- Commune
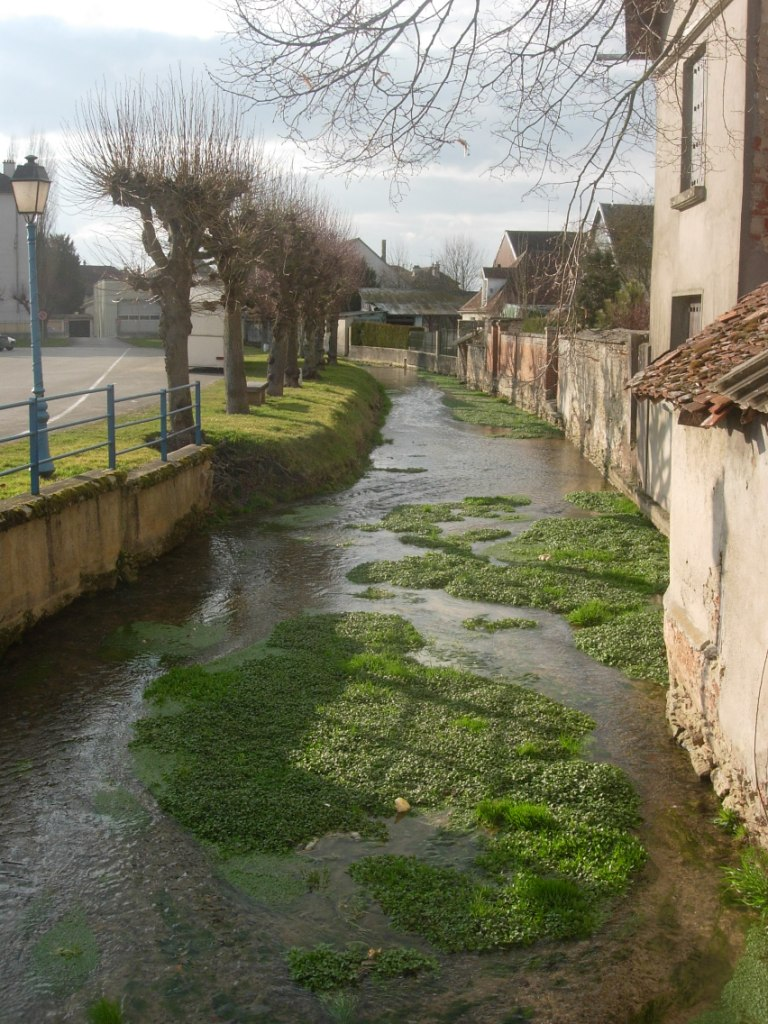
- The Barse river in Vendeuvre-sur-Barse

- Coat of arms
- Location of Vendeuvre-sur-Barse
- Location within France Location within Grand Est
- Coordinates: 48°14′21″N 4°28′07″E
- Country: France
- Region: Grand Est
- Department: Aube
- Arrondissement: Bar-sur-Aube
- Canton: Vendeuvre-sur-Barse

Government
  - Mayor (2020–2026): Marielle Chevallier
- Area^{1}: 51.94 km^{2} (20.05 sq mi)
- Elevation: 177 m (581 ft)
- Highest elevation: 233 m (764 ft)
- Lowest elevation: 144 m (472 ft)
- Population (2023): 2,225
  - Density: 42.84/km^{2} (110.9/sq mi)
- Time zone: UTC+01:00 (CET)
  - Summer (DST): UTC+02:00 (CEST)
- INSEE/Postal code: 10401 /10140
- ^{1} French Land Register data, which excludes lakes, ponds, glaciers > 1 km^{2} (0.386 sq mi or 247 acres) and river estuaries.

Vendeuvre-sur-Barse (French pronunciation: [vɑ̃dœvʁ syʁ baʁs], literally Vendeuvre on Barse) is a commune in the Aube department in north-central France. It was named for the Villa Venderevensis, and was known in Medieval Latin as Vendoara, Vendoberum, Vendœuvres, Vendopera, Vendoperanse Castrum, Vendopere, Vendoperium, Vendoprum, and Vendovera.

== Geography ==
The Barse has its source in the commune, under the chateau.

== Population ==
Historical population
Year	Pop.	±% p.a.
1968	1,821	—
1975	2,613	+5.29%
1982	2,940	+1.70%
1990	2,793	−0.64%
1999	2,623	−0.70%
2007	2,383	−1.19%
2012	2,395	+0.10%
2017	2,317	−0.66%
2023	2,225	−0.67%
Source: INSEE

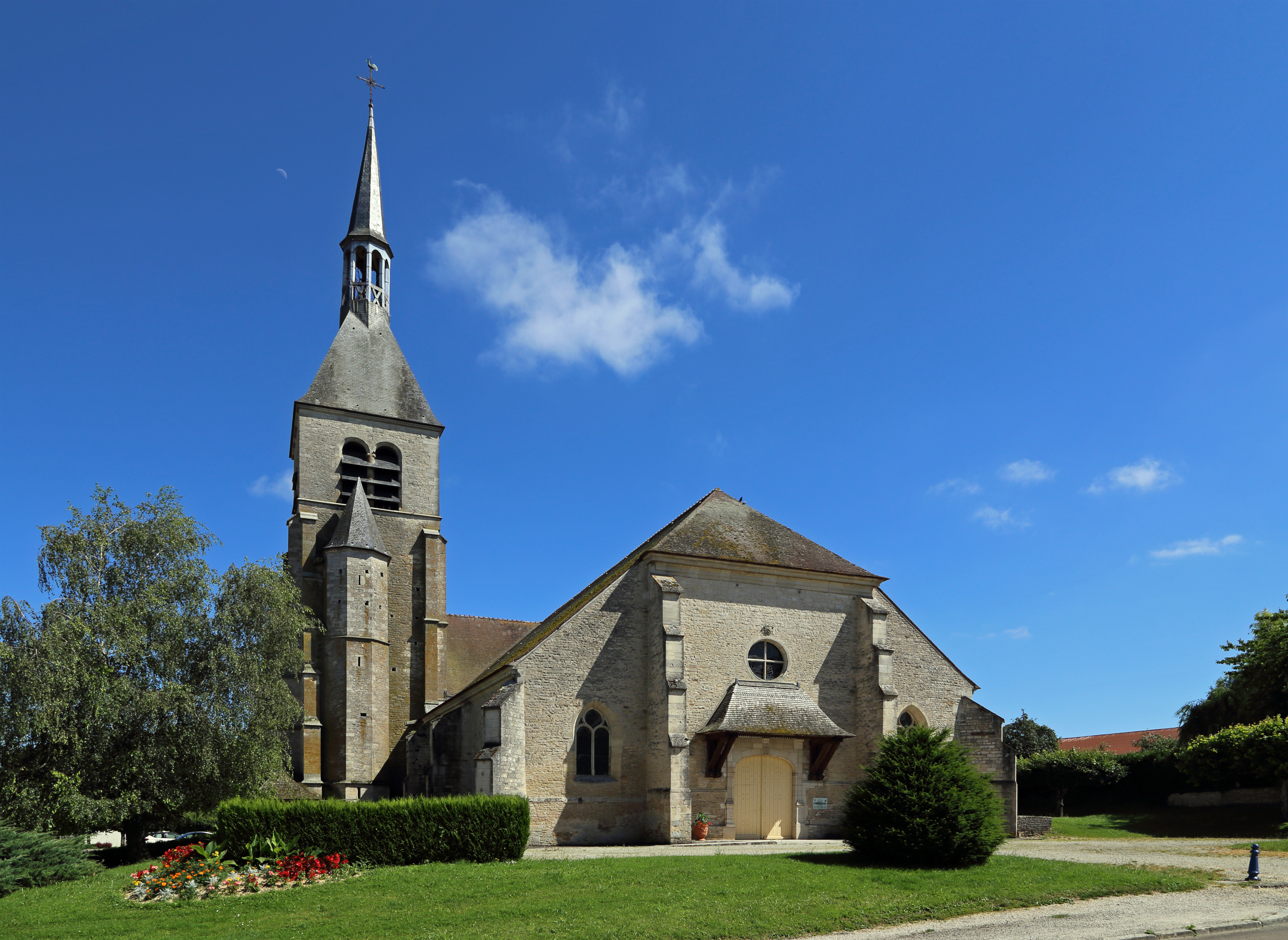
Saint-Pierre church

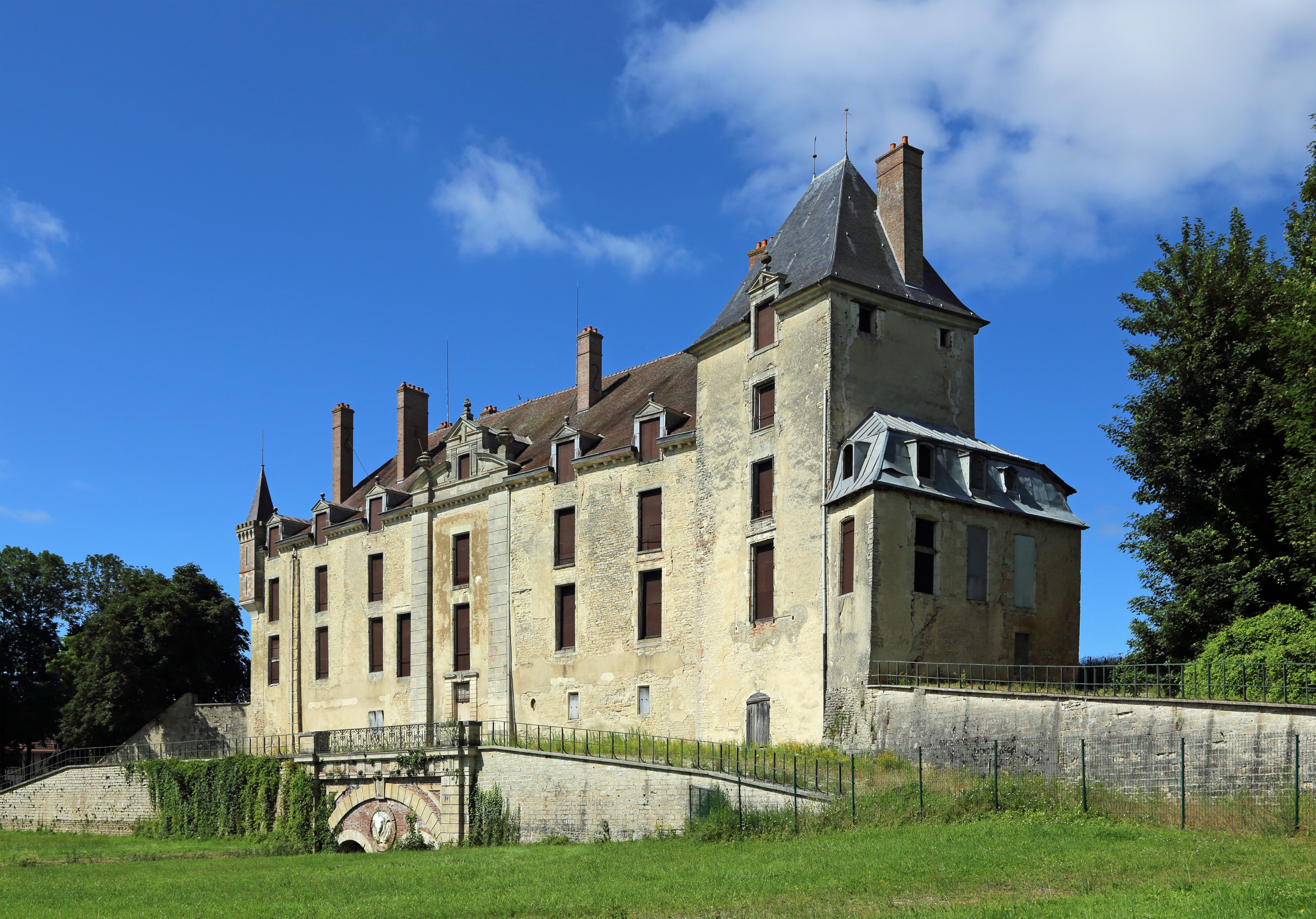
The castle

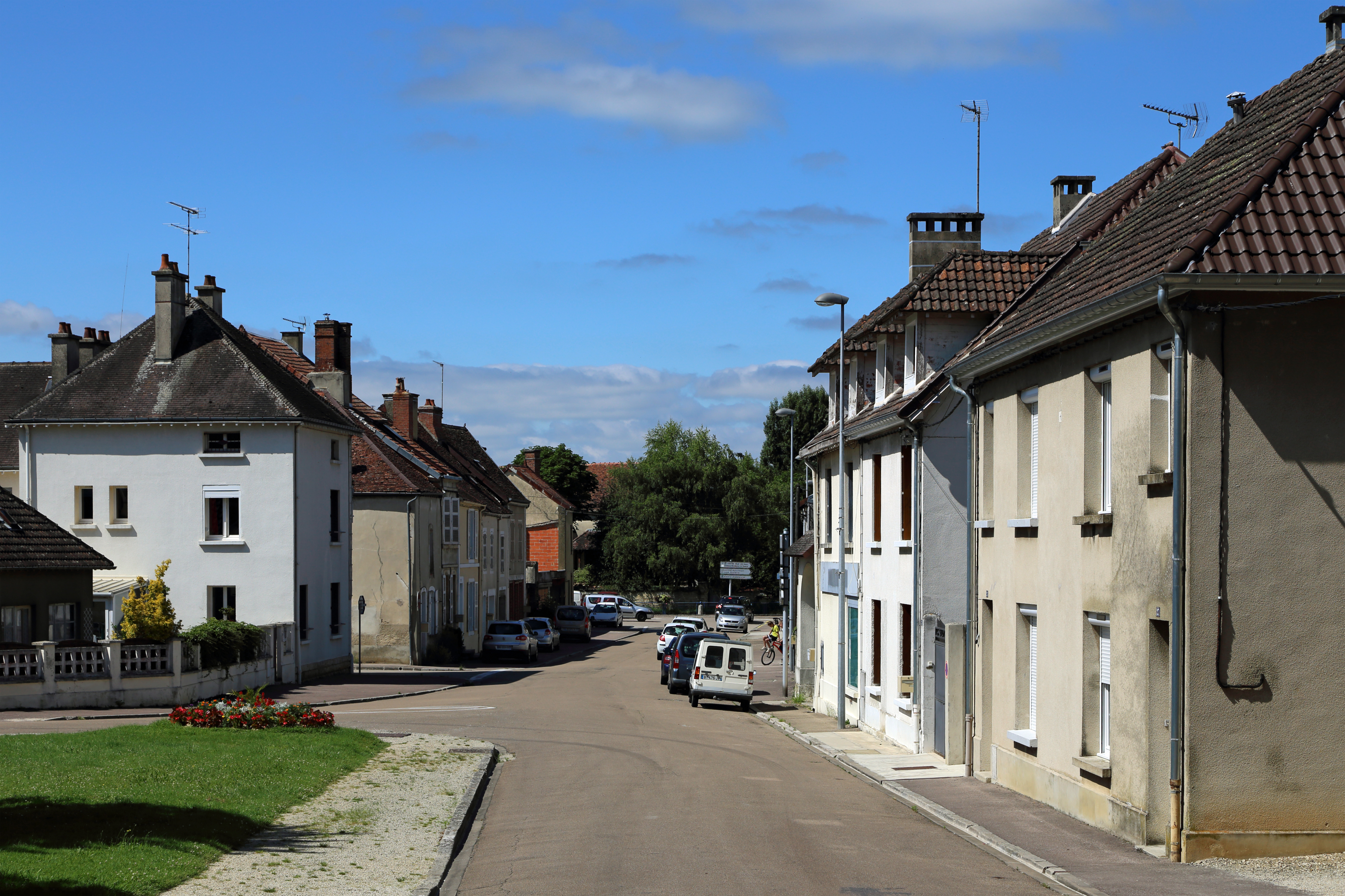
Street in the village

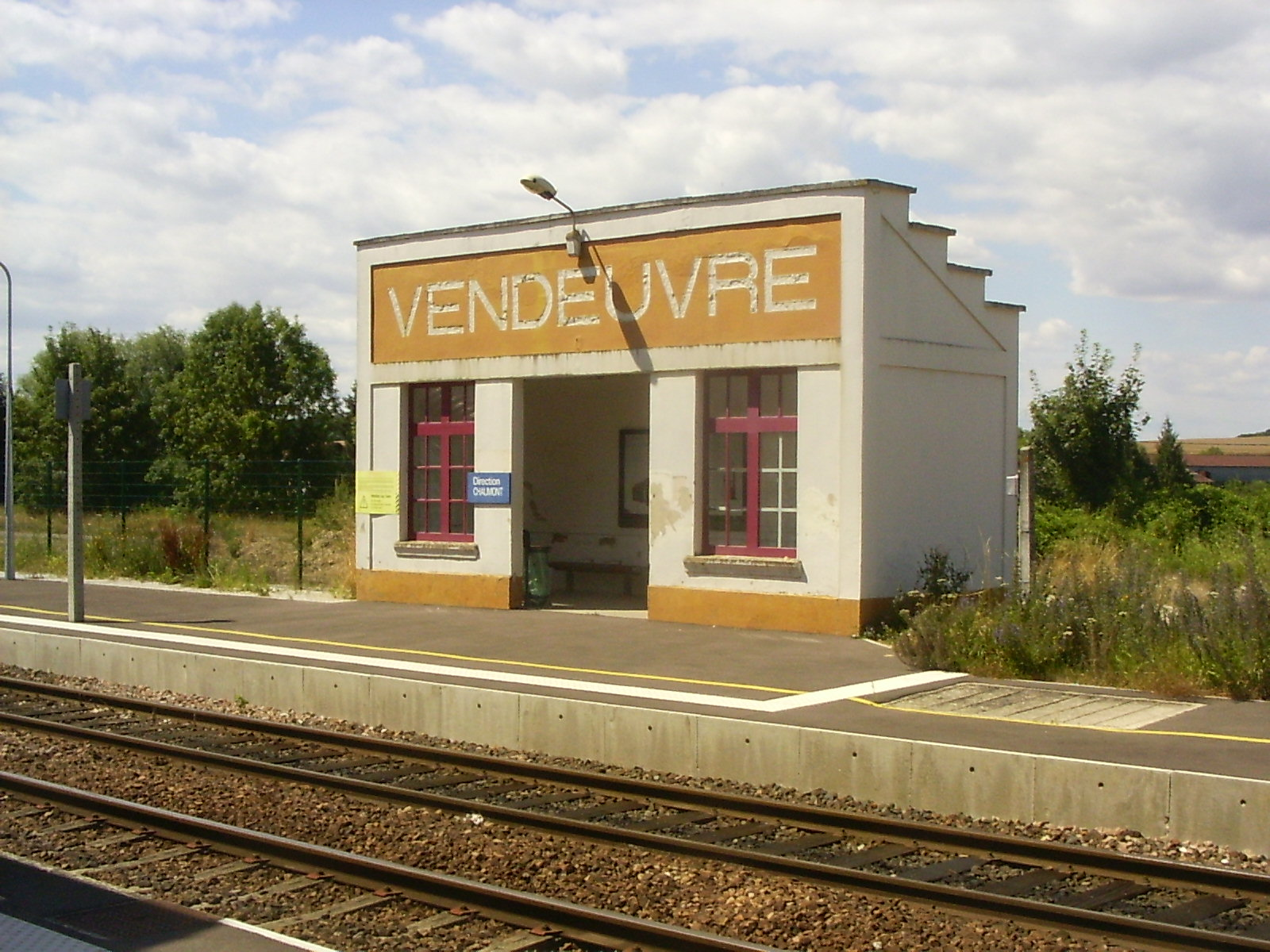
Train station: shelter

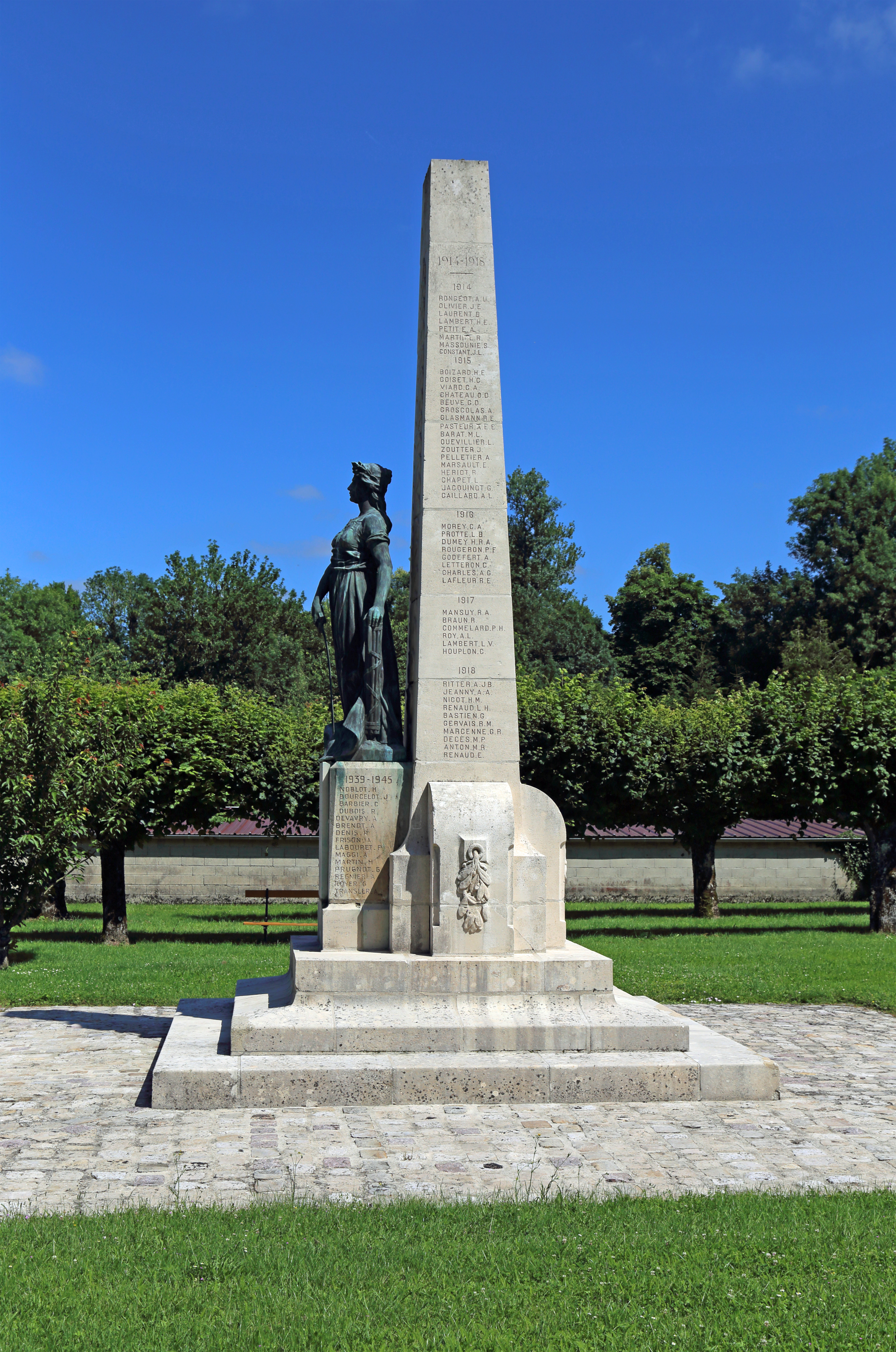
War memorial

== See also ==
- Communes of the Aube department
- Parc naturel régional de la Forêt d'Orient
- Lakes Amance and du Temple
