= Barse =

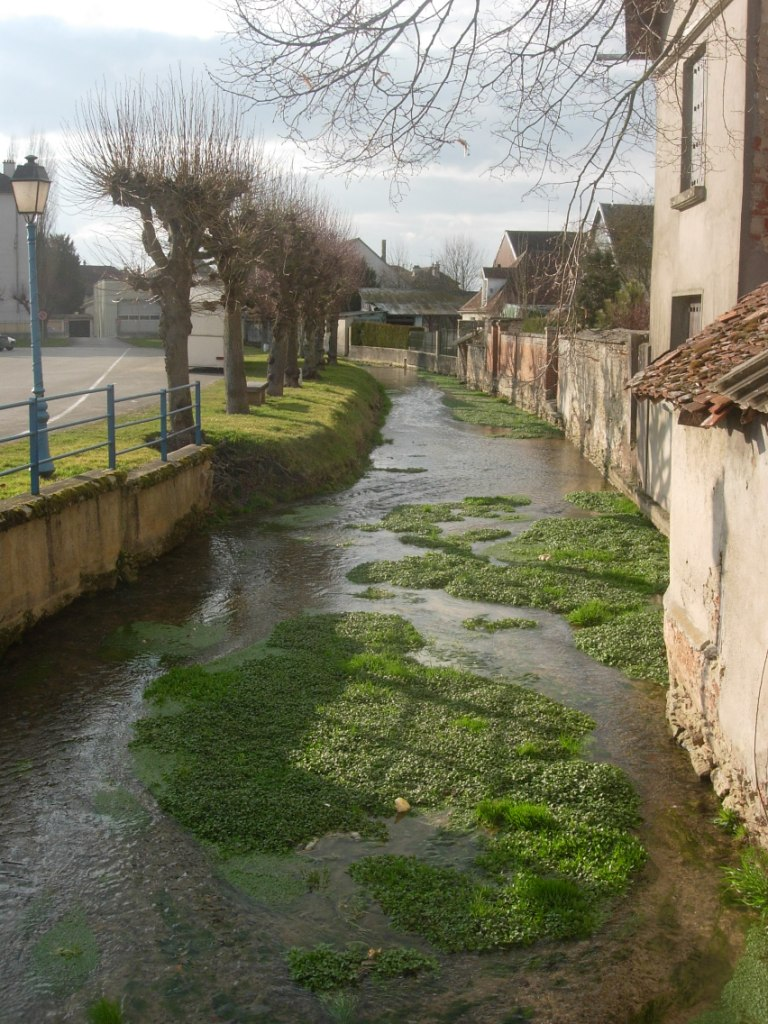
- The Barse at Vendeuvre-sur-Barse

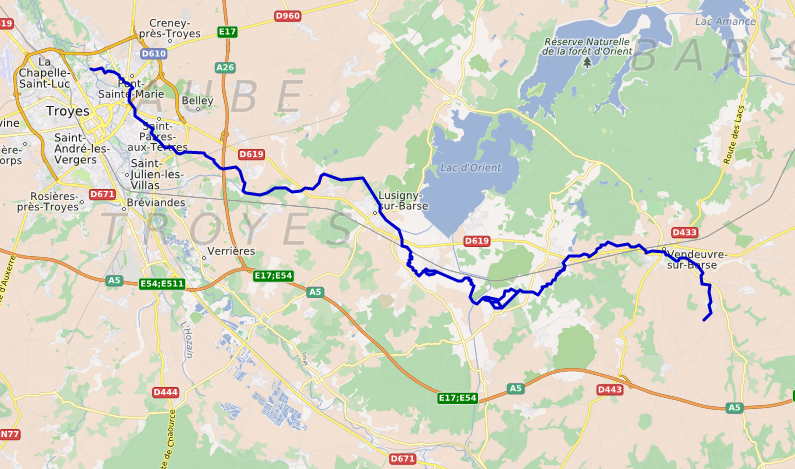

Location
- Country: France

Physical characteristics
- Source
  - location: Vendeuvre-sur-Barse
  - coordinates: 48°14′13″N 04°28′19″E
  - elevation: 155 m (509 ft)
- Mouth
  - location: Seine
  - coordinates: 48°17′37″N 04°06′51″E
  - elevation: 100 m (330 ft)
- Length: 50.1 km (31.1 mi)

Basin features
- Progression: Seine→ English Channel

The Barse (French pronunciation: [baʁs]) is a 50.1 km (31.1 mi) long river in the Aube department in north-east central France. Its source is under the château, in Vendeuvre-sur-Barse. It flows generally west. It is a right tributary of the Seine into which it flows at Saint-Parres-aux-Tertres, near Troyes.

== Communes along its course ==
This list is ordered from source to mouth: Vendeuvre-sur-Barse, Champ-sur-Barse, La Villeneuve-au-Chêne, Briel-sur-Barse, Montreuil-sur-Barse, Montiéramey, Lusigny-sur-Barse, Courteranges, Montaulin, Ruvigny, Rouilly-Saint-Loup, Saint-Parres-aux-Tertres
