= Lusigny-sur-Barse =

Commune in Grand Est, France

- Commune
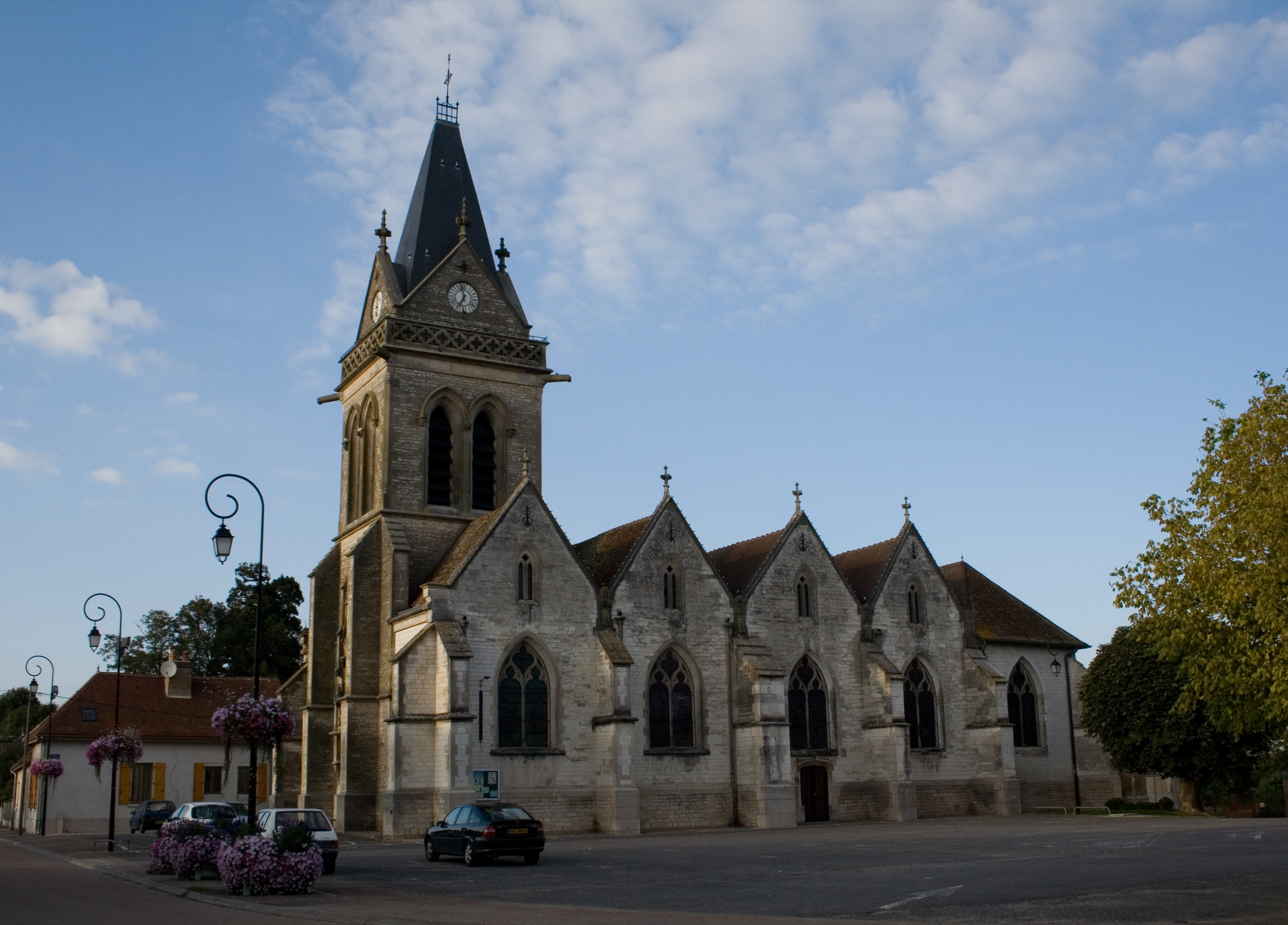
- The church in Lusigny-sur-Barse

- Coat of arms
- Location of Lusigny-sur-Barse
- Location within France Location within Grand Est
- Coordinates: 48°15′19″N 4°16′05″E
- Country: France
- Region: Grand Est
- Department: Aube
- Arrondissement: Troyes
- Canton: Vendeuvre-sur-Barse
- Intercommunality: CA Troyes Champagne Métropole

Government
  - Mayor (2021–2026): Marie-Hélène Tressou
- Area^{1}: 37.92 km^{2} (14.64 sq mi)
- Elevation: 127 m (417 ft)
- Population (2023): 2,267
  - Density: 59.78/km^{2} (154.8/sq mi)
- Time zone: UTC+01:00 (CET)
  - Summer (DST): UTC+02:00 (CEST)
- INSEE/Postal code: 10209 /10270
- ^{1} French Land Register data, which excludes lakes, ponds, glaciers > 1 km^{2} (0.386 sq mi or 247 acres) and river estuaries.

Lusigny-sur-Barse (French pronunciation: [lyziɲi syʁ baʁs]; lit. 'Lusigny-on-Barse') is a commune in the Aube department in the northeastern Grand Est region of France.

== Geography ==
The Barse flows through the commune.

The most recognisable building in Lusigny, throughout France (and abroad), is undoubtedly its railway station. Reproduced in miniature by the firm Jouef (maker of HO gauge electric trains, now a subsidiary of Hornby), the building gave hours of happiness to several generations of French children. The station was closed by the SNCF in the 1990s.

== Demographics ==
Historical population
| Year | Pop. | ±% p.a. |
|---|---|---|
| 1968 | 1,012 | — |
| 1975 | 990 | −0.31% |
| 1982 | 1,073 | +1.16% |
| 1990 | 1,281 | +2.24% |
| 1999 | 1,449 | +1.38% |
| 2007 | 1,668 | +1.77% |
| 2012 | 1,798 | +1.51% |
| 2017 | 2,167 | +3.80% |
| 2023 | 2,267 | +0.75% |
Source: INSEE

== See also ==
- Communes of the Aube department
- Parc naturel régional de la Forêt d'Orient
