= Champ-sur-Barse =

Commune in Grand Est, France

- Commune
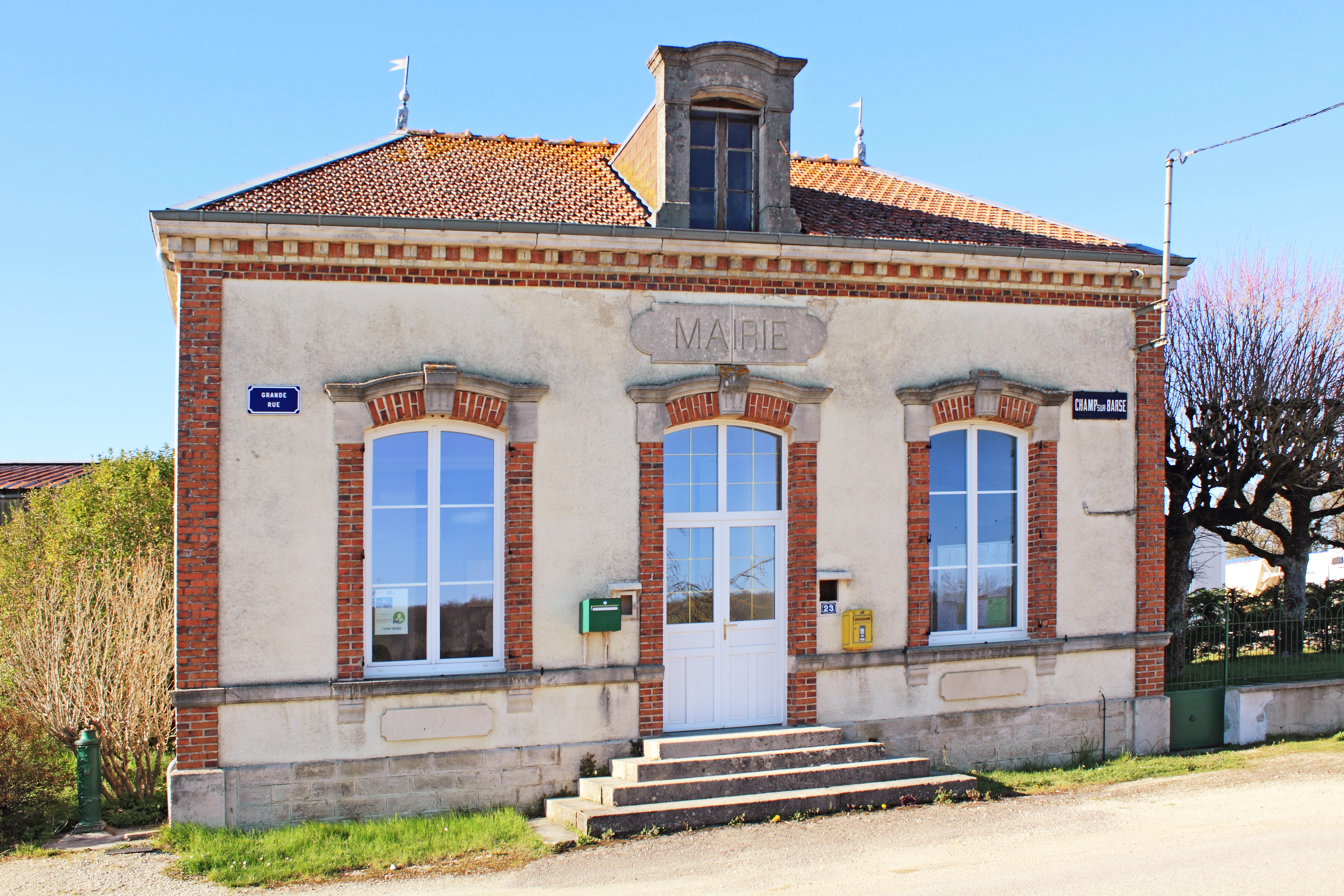
- The town hall in Champ-sur-Barse
- Location of Champ-sur-Barse
- Location within France Location within Grand Est
- Coordinates: 48°14′19″N 4°24′31″E
- Country: France
- Region: Grand Est
- Department: Aube
- Arrondissement: Bar-sur-Aube
- Canton: Vendeuvre-sur-Barse

Government
  - Mayor (2020–2026): Francis Desimpel
- Area^{1}: 7.12 km^{2} (2.75 sq mi)
- Elevation: 152 m (499 ft)
- Population (2023): 26
  - Density: 3.7/km^{2} (9.5/sq mi)
- Time zone: UTC+01:00 (CET)
  - Summer (DST): UTC+02:00 (CEST)
- INSEE/Postal code: 10078 /10140
- ^{1} French Land Register data, which excludes lakes, ponds, glaciers > 1 km^{2} (0.386 sq mi or 247 acres) and river estuaries.

Champ-sur-Barse (French pronunciation: [ʃɑ̃ syʁ baʁs], literally Champ on Barse) is a commune in the Aube department in north-central France.

== Geography ==
The Barse flows through the commune.

== Population ==
Historical population
Year	Pop.	±% p.a.
1968	42	—
1975	43	+0.34%
1982	46	+0.97%
1990	45	−0.27%
1999	34	−3.07%
2007	34	+0.00%
2012	30	−2.47%
2017	27	−2.09%
2023	26	−0.63%
Source: INSEE

== See also ==
- Communes of the Aube department
- List of medieval bridges in France
- Parc naturel régional de la Forêt d'Orient
