= Ruvigny =

Commune in Grand Est, France

- Commune
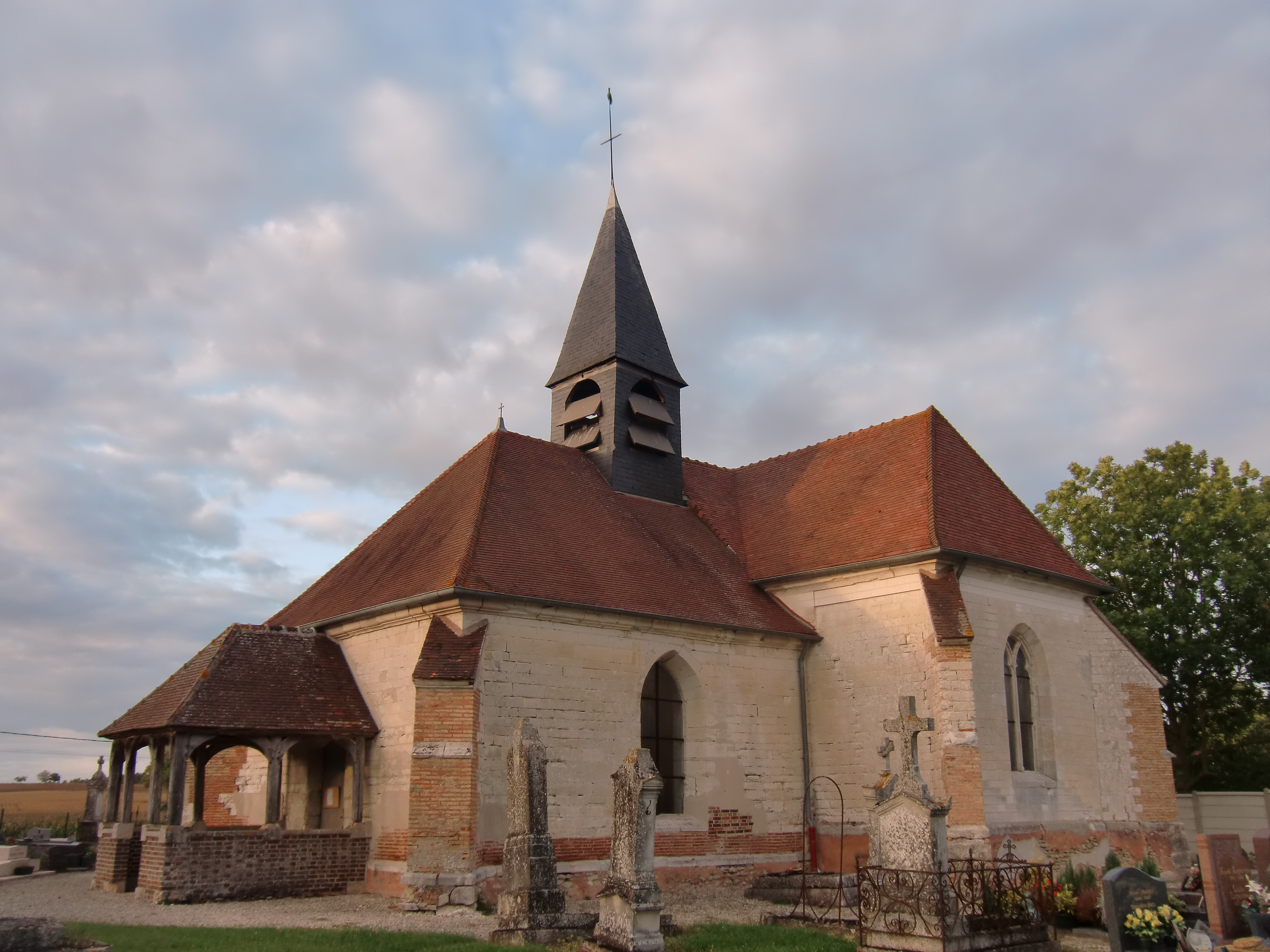
- The church in Ruvigny

- Coat of arms
- Location of Ruvigny
- Location within France Location within Grand Est
- Coordinates: 48°16′25″N 4°11′05″E
- Country: France
- Region: Grand Est
- Department: Aube
- Arrondissement: Troyes
- Canton: Vendeuvre-sur-Barse
- Intercommunality: CA Troyes Champagne Métropole

Government
  - Mayor (2021–2026): Carole Hup
- Area^{1}: 4.15 km^{2} (1.60 sq mi)
- Elevation: 110 m (360 ft)
- Population (2023): 501
  - Density: 121/km^{2} (313/sq mi)
- Time zone: UTC+01:00 (CET)
  - Summer (DST): UTC+02:00 (CEST)
- INSEE/Postal code: 10332 /10410
- ^{1} French Land Register data, which excludes lakes, ponds, glaciers > 1 km^{2} (0.386 sq mi or 247 acres) and river estuaries.

Ruvigny (French pronunciation: [ʁyviɲi]) is a commune in the Aube department in north-central France.

== Geography ==
The river Barse flows through the commune.

== Population ==
Historical population
Year	Pop.	±% p.a.
1968	118	—
1975	160	+4.45%
1982	277	+8.16%
1990	361	+3.37%
1999	383	+0.66%
2007	408	+0.79%
2012	470	+2.87%
2017	494	+1.00%
2023	501	+0.23%
Source: INSEE

== See also ==
- Communes of the Aube department
