= Montreuil-sur-Barse =

Commune in Grand Est, France

- Commune
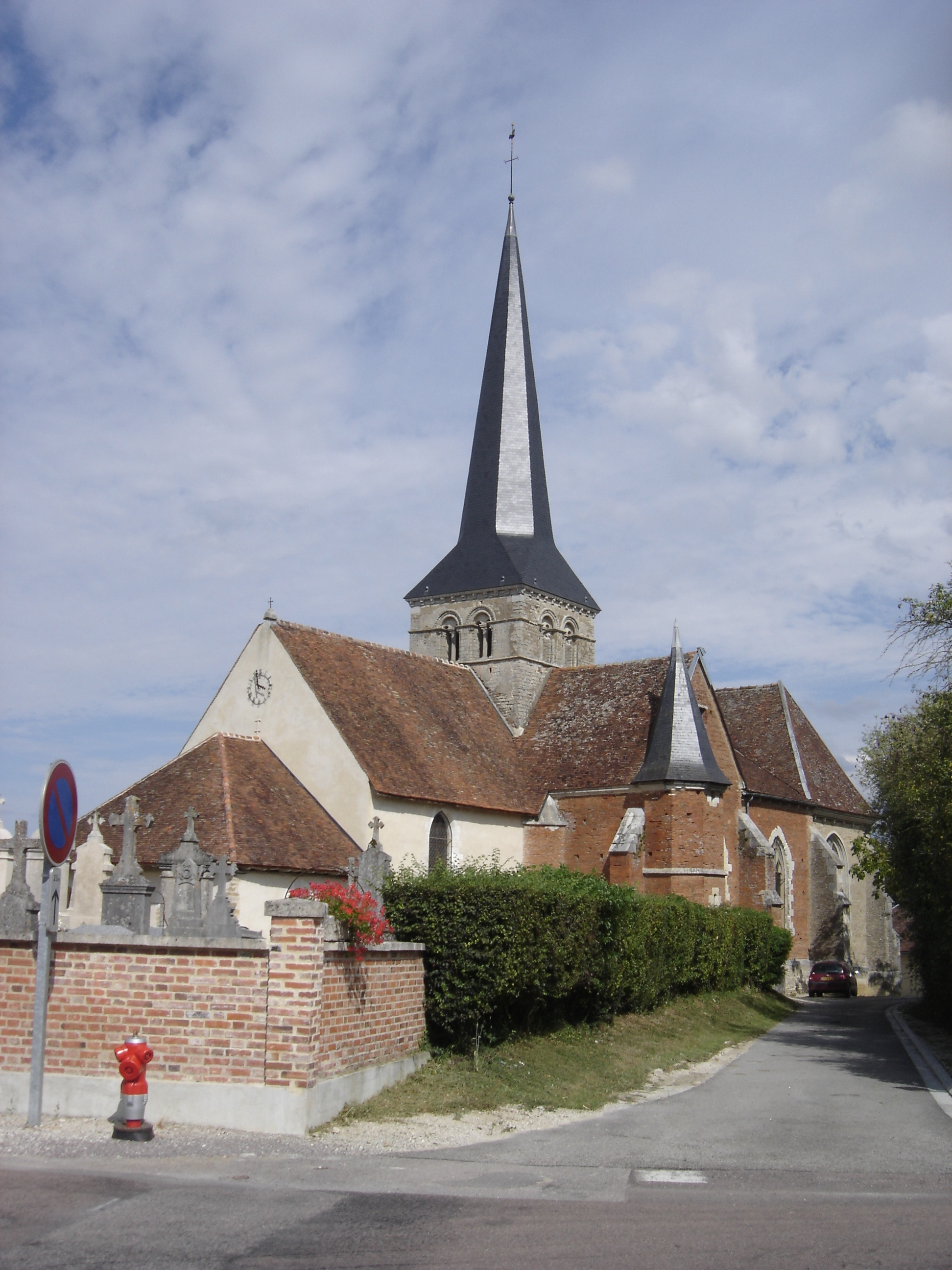
- The church in Montreuil-sur-Barse
- Location of Montreuil-sur-Barse
- Location within France Location within Grand Est
- Coordinates: 48°13′32″N 4°17′43″E
- Country: France
- Region: Grand Est
- Department: Aube
- Arrondissement: Troyes
- Canton: Vendeuvre-sur-Barse
- Intercommunality: CA Troyes Champagne Métropole

Government
  - Mayor (2020–2026): Philippe Sauvage
- Area^{1}: 13.13 km^{2} (5.07 sq mi)
- Elevation: 143 m (469 ft)
- Population (2023): 293
  - Density: 22.3/km^{2} (57.8/sq mi)
- Time zone: UTC+01:00 (CET)
  - Summer (DST): UTC+02:00 (CEST)
- INSEE/Postal code: 10255 /10270
- ^{1} French Land Register data, which excludes lakes, ponds, glaciers > 1 km^{2} (0.386 sq mi or 247 acres) and river estuaries.

Montreuil-sur-Barse (French pronunciation: [mɔ̃tʁœj syʁ baʁs], literally Montreuil on Barse) is a commune in the Aube department in north-central France.

== Geography ==
The Barse flows through the commune.

== Population ==
Historical population
Year	Pop.	±% p.a.
1968	203	—
1975	200	−0.21%
1982	222	+1.50%
1990	271	+2.52%
1999	269	−0.08%
2007	276	+0.32%
2012	321	+3.07%
2017	298	−1.48%
2023	293	−0.28%
Source: INSEE

== See also ==
- Communes of the Aube department
- Parc naturel régional de la Forêt d'Orient
