= Brienne-la-Vieille =

Commune in Grand Est, France

- Commune
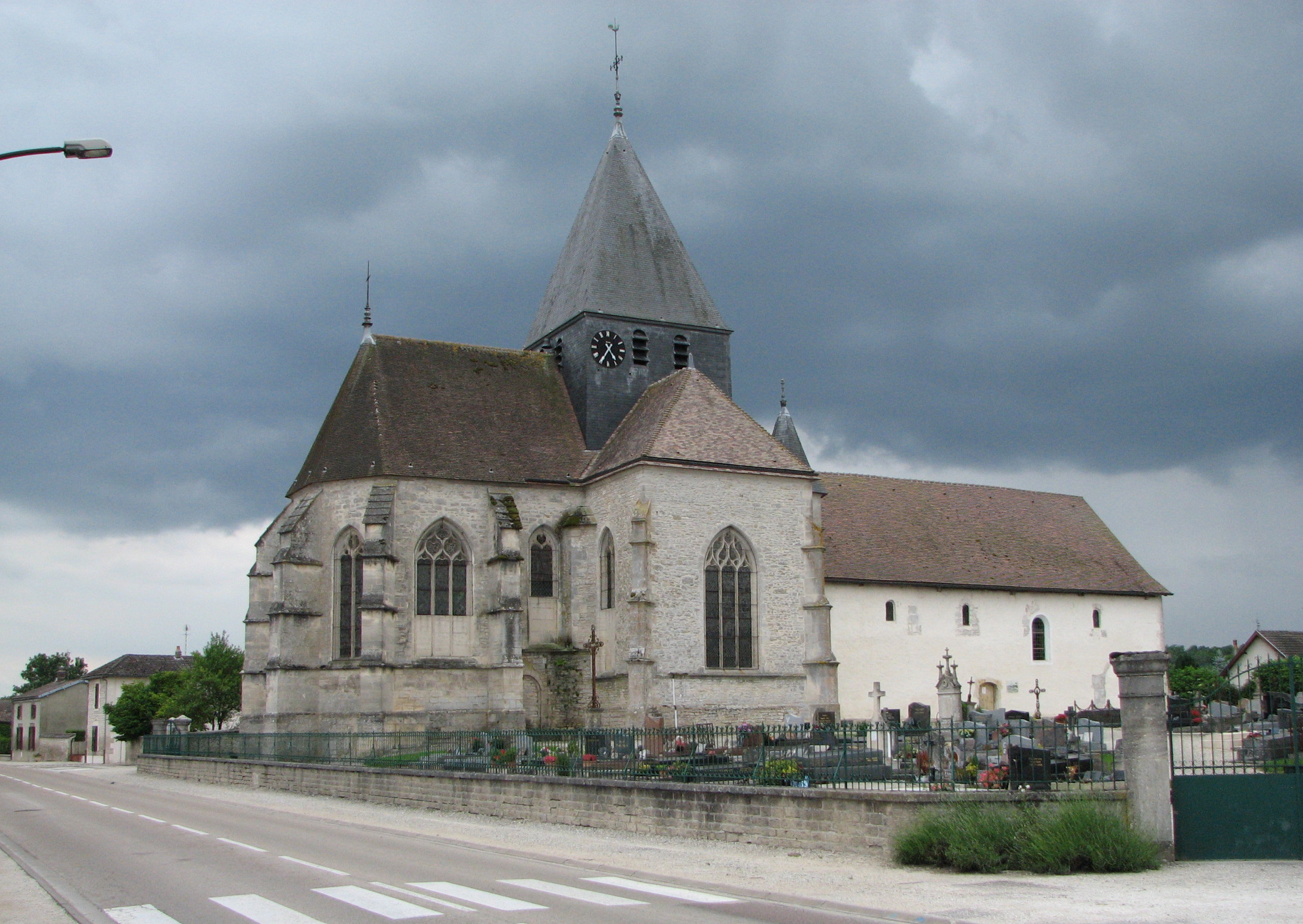
- The church in Brienne-la-Vieille
- Location of Brienne-la-Vieille
- Location within France Location within Grand Est
- Coordinates: 48°22′32″N 4°31′46″E
- Country: France
- Region: Grand Est
- Department: Aube
- Arrondissement: Bar-sur-Aube
- Canton: Brienne-le-Château

Government
  - Mayor (2023–2026): Gaël Grosmaire
- Area^{1}: 16.21 km^{2} (6.26 sq mi)
- Elevation: 126 m (413 ft)
- Highest elevation: 153 m (502 ft)
- Lowest elevation: 117 m (384 ft)
- Population (2023): 378
  - Density: 23.3/km^{2} (60.4/sq mi)
- Time zone: UTC+01:00 (CET)
  - Summer (DST): UTC+02:00 (CEST)
- INSEE/Postal code: 10063 /10500
- ^{1} French Land Register data, which excludes lakes, ponds, glaciers > 1 km^{2} (0.386 sq mi or 247 acres) and river estuaries.

Brienne-la-Vieille (French pronunciation: [bʁijɛn la vjɛj]) is a commune in the Aube department in north-central France.

The commune is bordered to the north by Brienne-le-Château in southern Champagne, and is traversed by the river Aube. It lies to the north of Lake Amance in the Parc naturel régional de la Forêt d'Orient, one of the regional natural parks of France.

== Population ==
Historical population
Year	Pop.	±% p.a.
1968	456	—
1975	404	−1.71%
1982	486	+2.68%
1990	447	−1.04%
1999	420	−0.69%
2007	450	+0.87%
2012	452	+0.09%
2017	423	−1.32%
2023	378	−1.86%
Source: INSEE

== Administration ==
Previous mayors:

- Benoit Cerf, elected 2001, re-elected 2008.

== See also ==
- Communes of the Aube department
- Parc naturel régional de la Forêt d'Orient
