= Radonvilliers =

Commune in Grand Est, France

- Commune
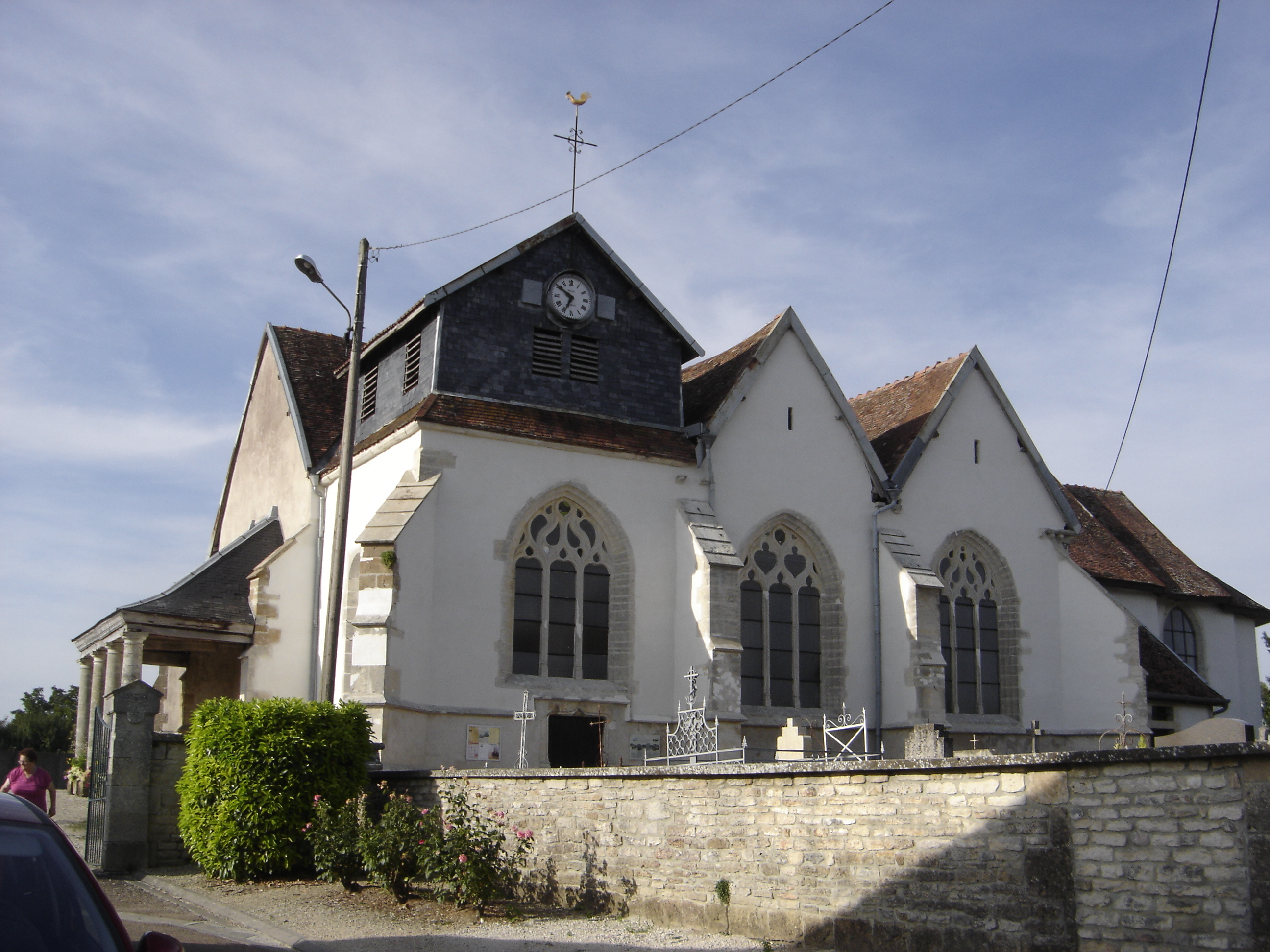
- The church in Radonvilliers

- Coat of arms
- Location of Radonvilliers
- Location within France Location within Grand Est
- Coordinates: 48°21′36″N 4°30′18″E
- Country: France
- Region: Grand Est
- Department: Aube
- Arrondissement: Bar-sur-Aube
- Canton: Brienne-le-Château

Government
  - Mayor (2020–2026): Jean-Baptiste Bertin
- Area^{1}: 23.29 km^{2} (8.99 sq mi)
- Elevation: 132 m (433 ft)
- Population (2023): 320
  - Density: 14/km^{2} (36/sq mi)
- Time zone: UTC+01:00 (CET)
  - Summer (DST): UTC+02:00 (CEST)
- INSEE/Postal code: 10313 /10500
- ^{1} French Land Register data, which excludes lakes, ponds, glaciers > 1 km^{2} (0.386 sq mi or 247 acres) and river estuaries.

Radonvilliers (French pronunciation: [ʁadɔ̃vilje]) is a commune in the Aube department in north-central France.

== Population ==
Historical population
Year	Pop.	±% p.a.
1968	351	—
1975	365	+0.56%
1982	337	−1.13%
1990	370	+1.17%
1999	367	−0.09%
2007	381	+0.47%
2012	407	+1.33%
2017	376	−1.57%
2023	320	−2.65%
Source: INSEE

== See also ==
- Communes of the Aube department
- Parc naturel régional de la Forêt d'Orient
