= Mesnil-Sellières =

Commune in Grand Est, France

- Commune
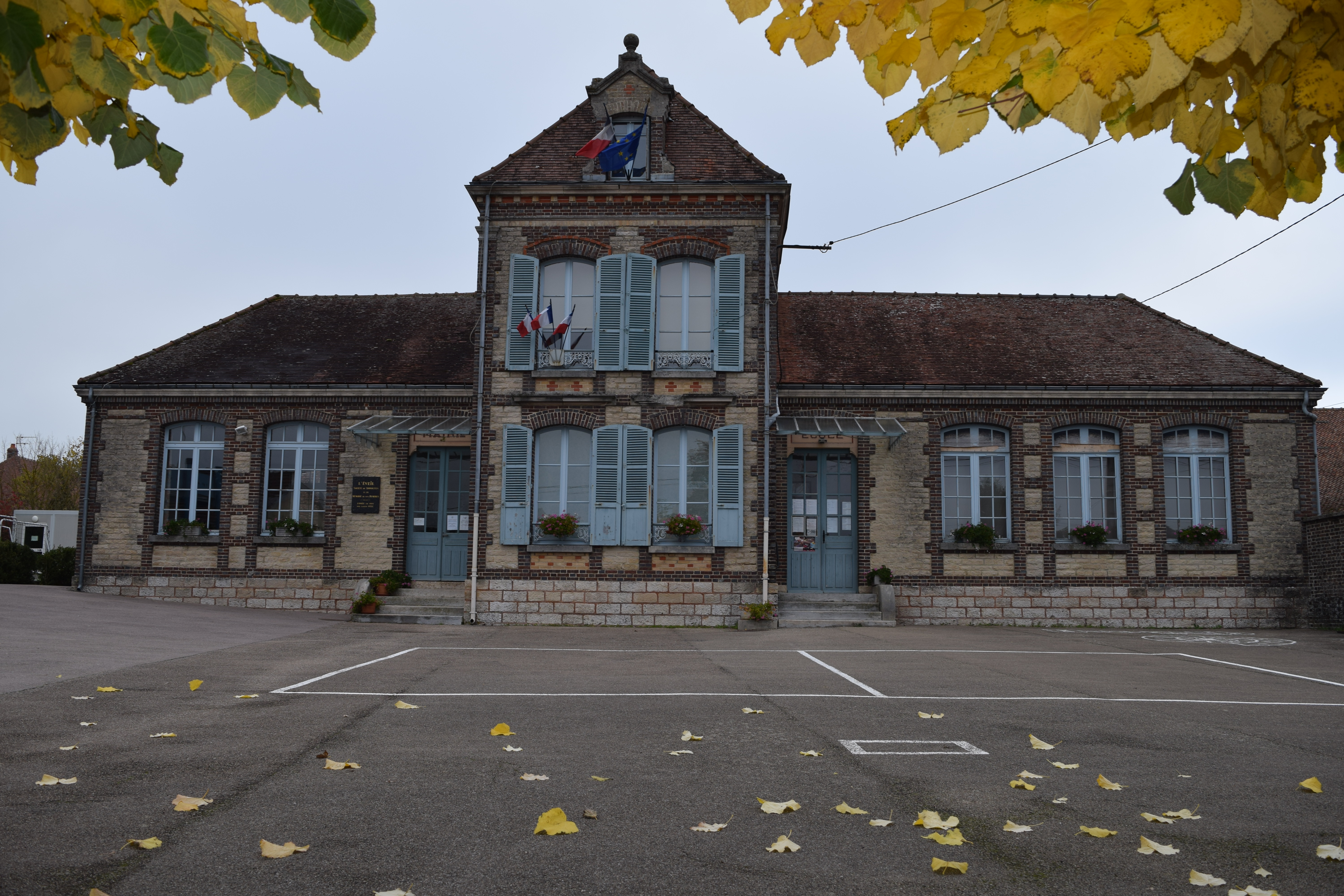
- The town hall in Mesnil-Sellières
- Location of Mesnil-Sellières
- Location within France Location within Grand Est
- Coordinates: 48°20′27″N 4°13′19″E
- Country: France
- Region: Grand Est
- Department: Aube
- Arrondissement: Troyes
- Canton: Brienne-le-Château
- Intercommunality: Forêts, lacs, terres en Champagne

Government
  - Mayor (2020–2026): Olivier Jacquinet
- Area^{1}: 8.43 km^{2} (3.25 sq mi)
- Elevation: 167 m (548 ft)
- Population (2023): 568
  - Density: 67.4/km^{2} (175/sq mi)
- Time zone: UTC+01:00 (CET)
  - Summer (DST): UTC+02:00 (CEST)
- INSEE/Postal code: 10239 /10220
- ^{1} French Land Register data, which excludes lakes, ponds, glaciers > 1 km^{2} (0.386 sq mi or 247 acres) and river estuaries.

Mesnil-Sellières (French pronunciation: [mɛnil sɛljɛʁ]) is a commune in the Aube department in north-central France.

== Population ==
Historical population
Year	Pop.	±% p.a.
1968	280	—
1975	282	+0.10%
1982	325	+2.05%
1990	370	+1.63%
1999	377	+0.21%
2007	534	+4.45%
2012	585	+1.84%
2017	584	−0.03%
2023	568	−0.46%
Source: INSEE

== See also ==
- Communes of the Aube department
- Parc naturel régional de la Forêt d'Orient
