= Brévonnes =

Commune in Grand Est, France

- Commune
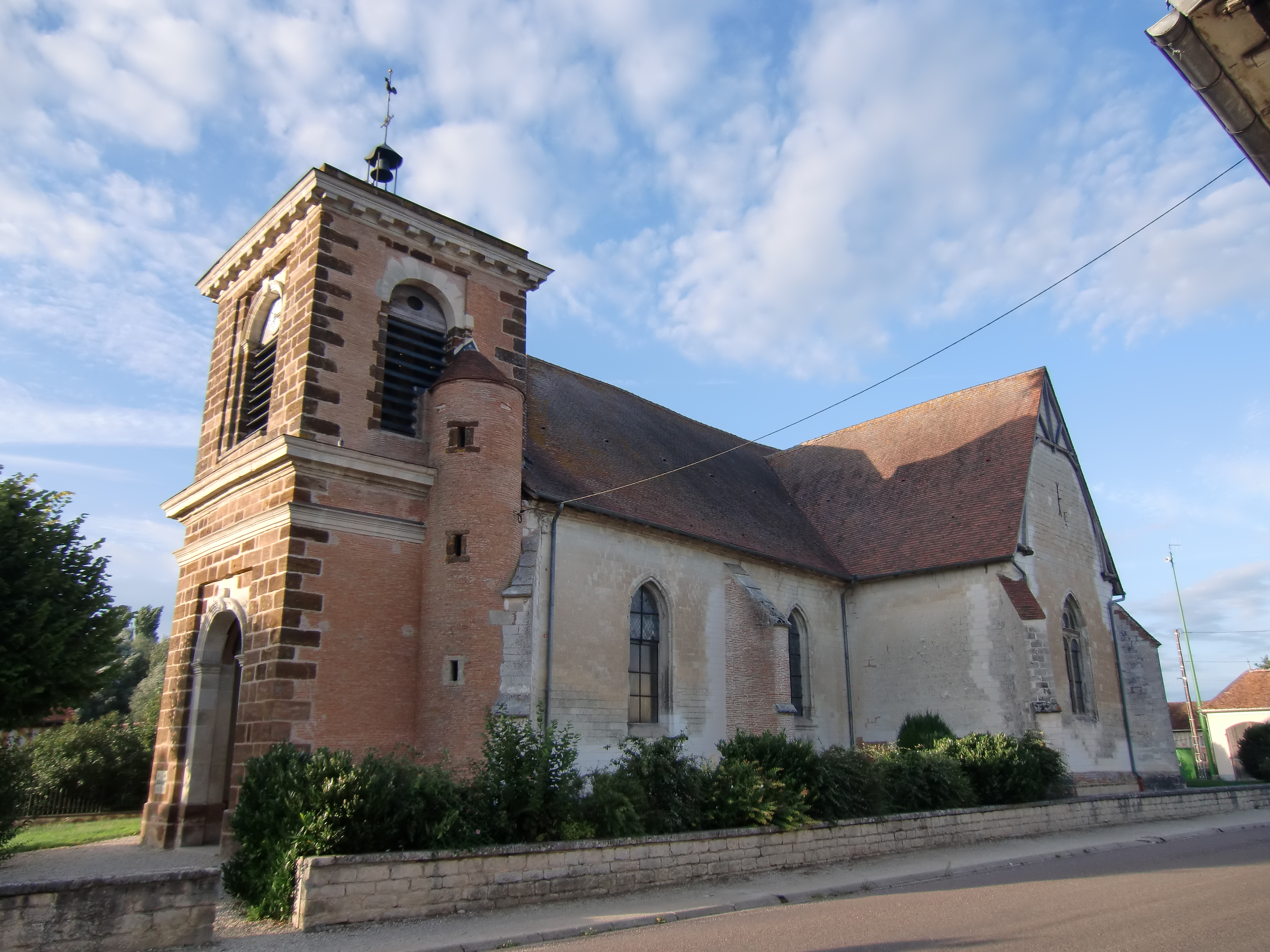
- The church in Brévonnes
- Location of Brévonnes
- Location within France Location within Grand Est
- Coordinates: 48°21′28″N 4°23′59″E
- Country: France
- Region: Grand Est
- Department: Aube
- Arrondissement: Troyes
- Canton: Brienne-le-Château
- Intercommunality: Forêts, lacs, terres en Champagne

Government
  - Mayor (2020–2026): Lydie Finello
- Area^{1}: 19.77 km^{2} (7.63 sq mi)
- Elevation: 134 m (440 ft)
- Population (2023): 673
  - Density: 34.0/km^{2} (88.2/sq mi)
- Time zone: UTC+01:00 (CET)
  - Summer (DST): UTC+02:00 (CEST)
- INSEE/Postal code: 10061 /10220
- ^{1} French Land Register data, which excludes lakes, ponds, glaciers > 1 km^{2} (0.386 sq mi or 247 acres) and river estuaries.

Brévonnes (French pronunciation: [bʁevɔn]) is a commune in the Aube department in north-central France.

== Population ==
Historical population
Year	Pop.	±% p.a.
1968	648	—
1975	563	−1.99%
1982	655	+2.19%
1990	604	−1.01%
1999	584	−0.37%
2007	676	+1.85%
2012	705	+0.84%
2017	686	−0.54%
2023	673	−0.32%
Source: INSEE

== See also ==
- Communes of the Aube department
- Parc naturel régional de la Forêt d'Orient
