= Orient Forest Regional Natural Park =

- IUCN category V (protected landscape/seascape)
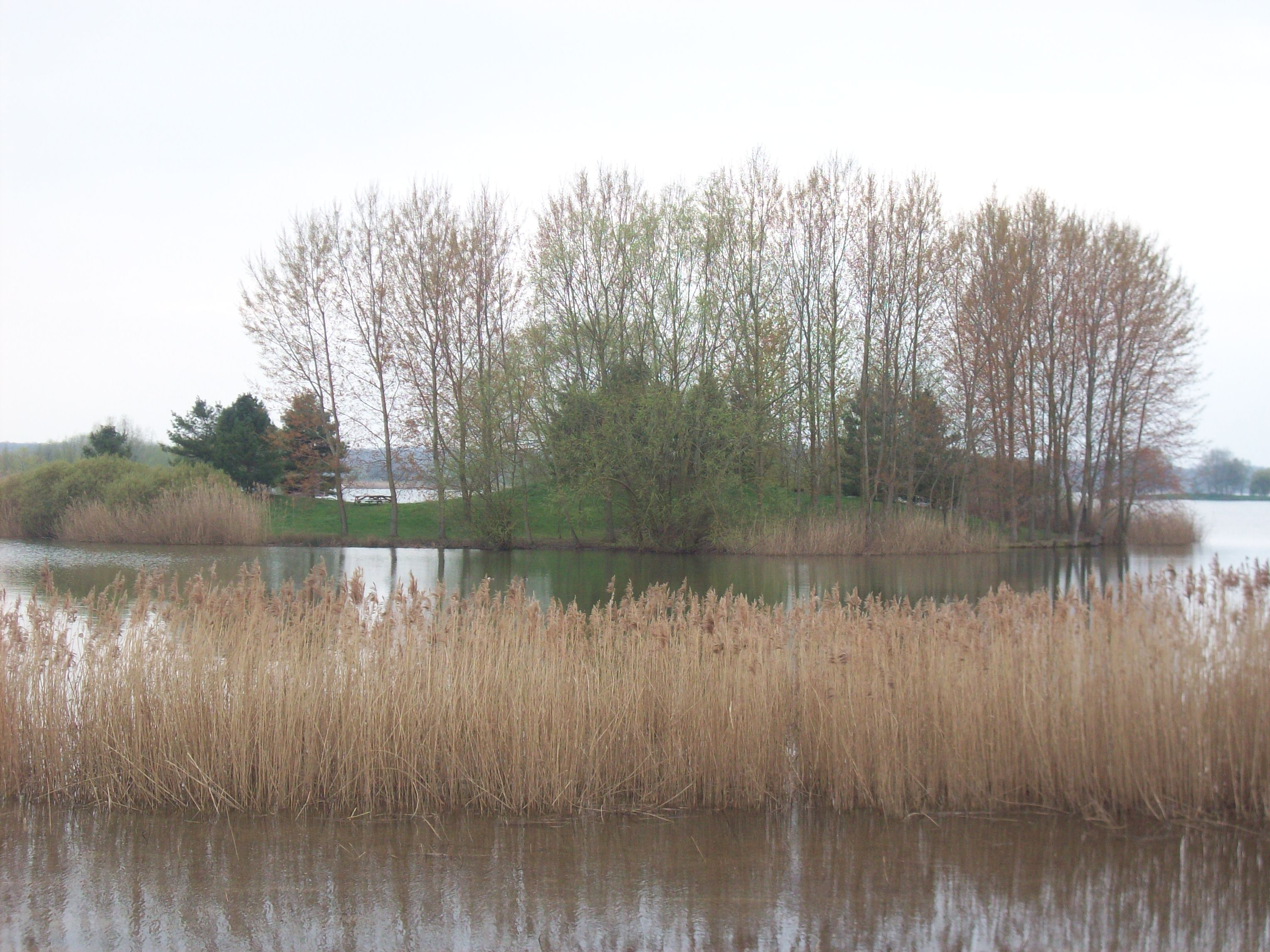
- Interactive map of Orient Forest Regional Natural Park
- Location: Grand Est, Aube, France
- Coordinates: 48.31193238°N 4.40433556°E
- Established: 1970
- Governing body: Fédération des parcs naturels régionaux de France
- Website: www.pnr-foret-orient.fr

Orient Forest Regional Natural Park (French: Parc naturel régional de la Forêt d'Orient) is a protected area of woodlands and lakes in the Champagne-Ardenne region of France. It covers a total area of 70,000 hectares (170,000 acres) The parkland encompasses the large Forêt d'Orient National Nature Reserve and three man-made lakes: Lac d'Orient, Lac du Temple and Lac Amance. The area was officially designated as a regional natural park in 1970.

== Member communes ==
The park includes the following member communes:

- Amance • Argançon • Assencières
- Blaincourt-sur-Aube • Bossancourt • Bouranton • Brévonnes • Briel-sur-Barse • Brienne-la-Vieille • Brienne-le-Château
- Champ-sur-Barse • Chauffour-lès-Bailly • Courteranges
- Dienville • Dolancourt • Dosches
- Épagne
- Géraudot
- Jessains • Juvanzé
- Lassicourt • Laubressel • Lesmont • La Loge-aux-Chèvres • Lusigny-sur-Barse • Luyères
- Magny-Fouchard • Maison-des-Champs • Maizières-lès-Brienne • Mathaux • Mesnil-Saint-Père • Mesnil-Sellières • Molins-sur-Aube • Montiéramey • Montreuil-sur-Barse
- Onjon
- Pel-et-Der • Piney • Précy-Notre-Dame • Précy-Saint-Martin • Puits-et-Nuisement
- Radonvilliers • Rosnay-l'Hôpital • La Rothière • Rouilly-Sacey
- Saint-Christophe-Dodinicourt • Saint-Léger-sous-Brienne
- Thennelières • Trannes
- Unienville
- Val-d'Auzon • Vauchonvilliers • Vendeuvre-sur-Barse • Villemoyenne

== Lakes ==
The three man-made lakes offer sport and leisure activities for visitors and a home to animals. The largest, Lac d'Orient, covers 2,500 hectares (6,200 acres) beside two marinas and three sand beaches.

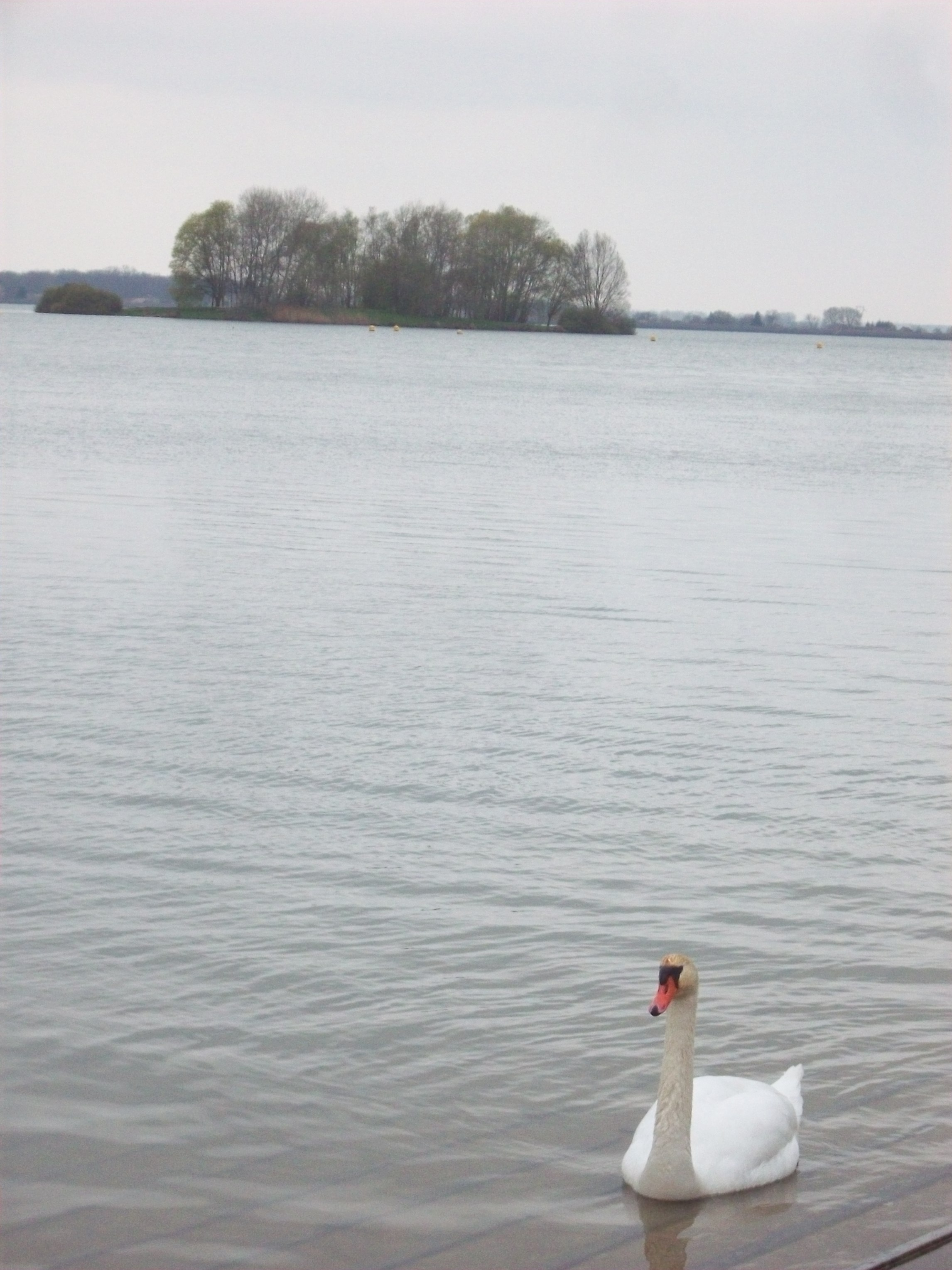
Lac Amance

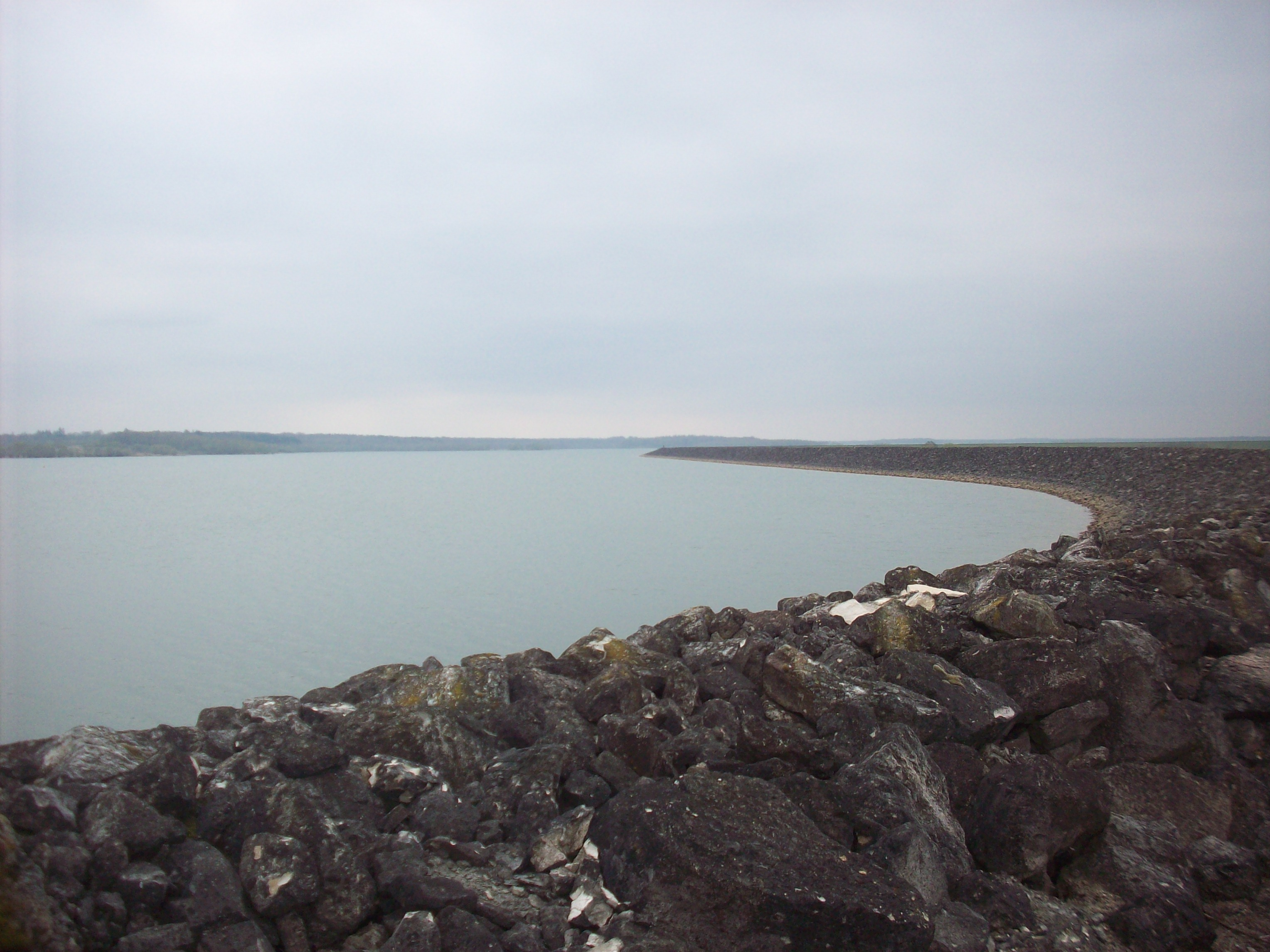
Lac du Temple

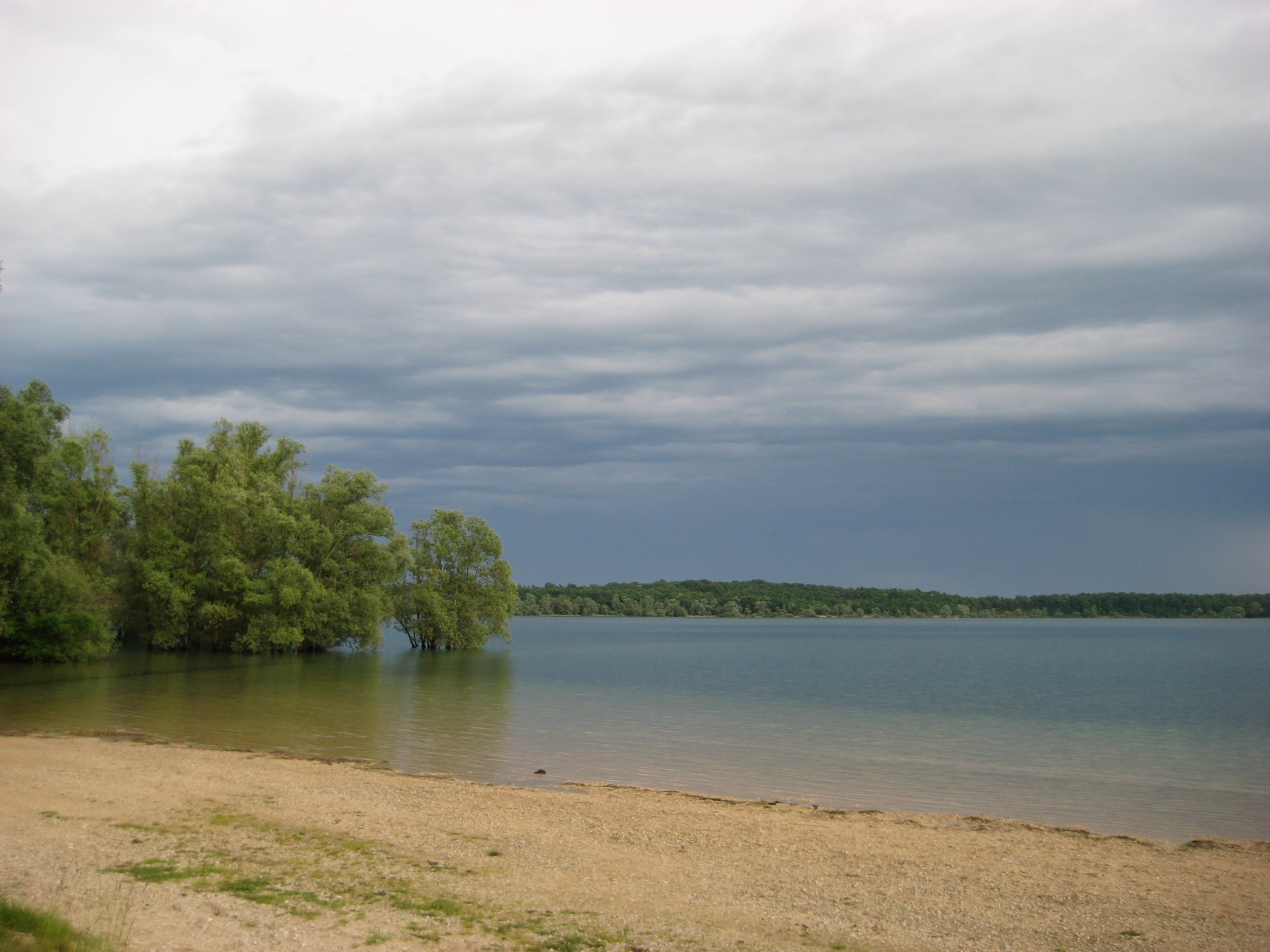
Lac d'Orient

== See also ==
- List of regional natural parks of France
- Lake of Orient
