= Amance, Aube =

Commune in Grand Est, France

Amance
- Commune
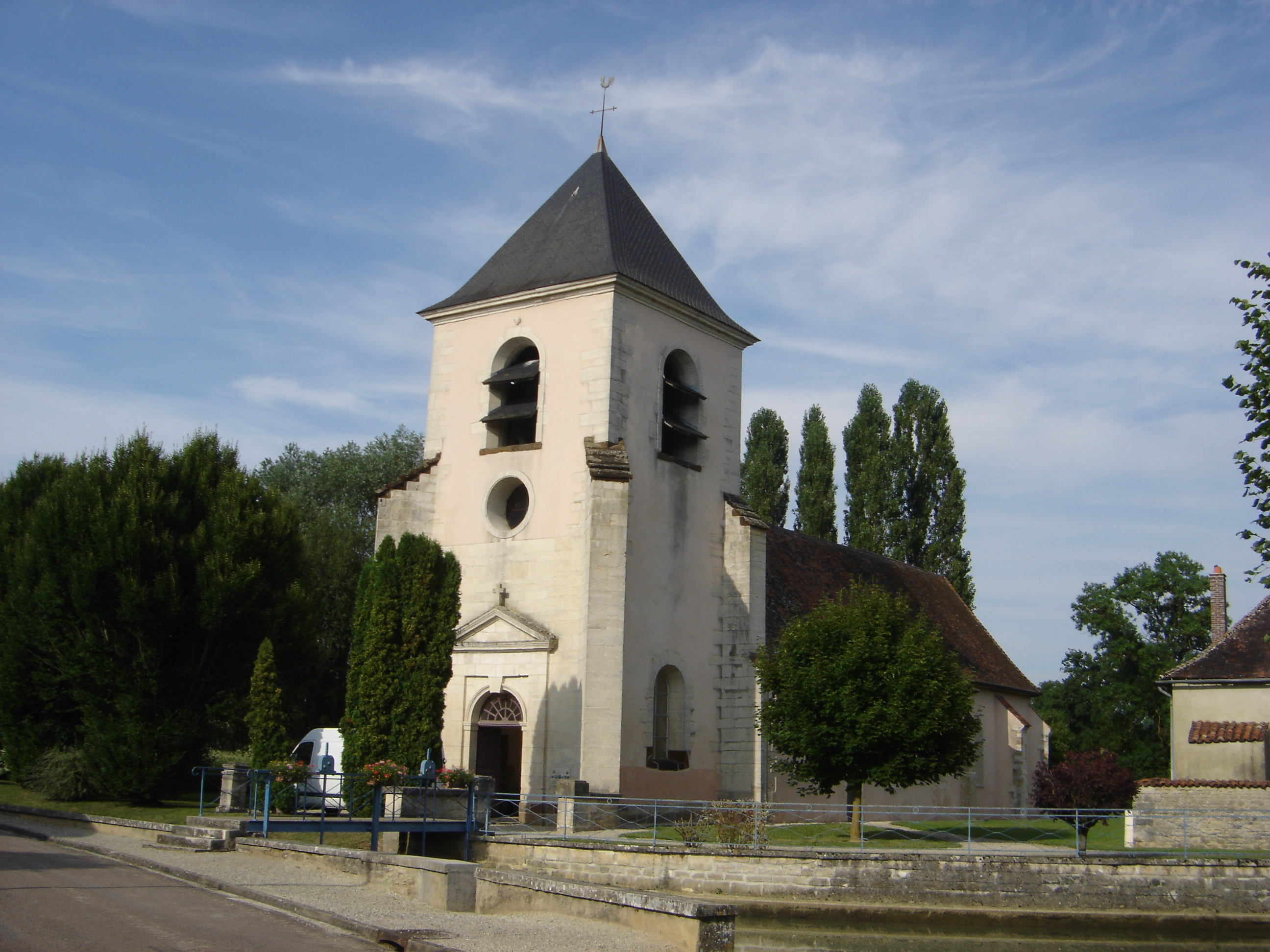
- The church in Amance
- Location of Amance
- Location within France Location within Grand Est
- Coordinates: 48°17′43″N 4°30′57″E
- Country: France
- Region: Grand Est
- Department: Aube
- Arrondissement: Bar-sur-Aube
- Canton: Vendeuvre-sur-Barse
- Intercommunality: Vendeuvre-Soulaines

Government
  - Mayor (2020–2026): Jean-Michel Pietremont
- Area^{1}: 22.88 km^{2} (8.83 sq mi)
- Elevation: 160 m (520 ft)
- Highest elevation: 213 m (699 ft)
- Lowest elevation: 132 m (433 ft)
- Population (2023): 245
  - Density: 10.7/km^{2} (27.7/sq mi)
- Time zone: UTC+01:00 (CET)
  - Summer (DST): UTC+02:00 (CEST)
- INSEE/Postal code: 10005 /10140
- ^{1} French Land Register data, which excludes lakes, ponds, glaciers > 1 km^{2} (0.386 sq mi or 247 acres) and river estuaries.

Amance (French pronunciation: [amɑ̃s]) is a commune in the Aube department in the Grand Est region of north-central France.

== Geography ==
Amance is located some 30 km east of Troyes and 10 km south of Brienne-le-Chateau. It can be accessed from Brienne-le-Chateau and Dienville in the north by road D443 which runs south to the village then through the heart of the commune south to Vendeuvre-sur-Barse. The road D112 also goes south-east to Vauchonvilliers and the D18 road goes east to Jessains.

The commune consists of farmland in the east but is heavily forested in the west to about 50% of its area. Apart from the village there is also the hamlet of La Ville aux Bois south-west of the village.

The Amance River runs through the village to the north into the Canal d'Amenee and forms part of the western boundary of the commune. A few small streams flow into it.

== History ==
In 1825 Amance absorbed La Ville-aux-Bois-lès-Vendeuvre which should not be confused with La Ville-aux-Bois commune also in the Aube.

== Administration ==
List of Successive Mayors of Amance

From	To	Name
	1857	Guichard
1995	2008	Paul Hubail
2008		Jean-Michel Pietremont
2014	2026	Laurent Brouillard
2026	Incumbent	Jean-Claude Vié

== Population ==
The inhabitants of the commune are known as Amançois or Amançoises in French.

Historical population
Year	Pop.	±% p.a.
1968	301	—
1975	274	−1.33%
1982	238	−1.99%
1990	228	−0.54%
1999	235	+0.34%
2007	253	+0.93%
2012	274	+1.61%
2017	274	+0.00%
2023	245	−1.85%
Source: INSEE

== Culture and heritage ==
=== Civil heritage ===
- The Town Hall contains three items that are registered as historical objects:
  - A Wardrobe (18th century)
  - A Louis XVI Chair (18th century)
  - The Furniture in the Town Hall

=== Religious heritage ===
The Church of Saint Martin is a unique Romanesque building, rebuilt in the 16th and 19th centuries.

The Church contains many items that are registered as historical objects:

- A Statue: The Virgin (16th century)
- Stained glass windows (16th century)
- A Baptismal font (16th century)
- A Painted Panel: Placing in the Tomb (disappeared) (16th century)
- A Bronze Bell (1680)
- A Pulpit (18th century)
- A Tombstone (17th century)
- A Painting: Institution of the Rosary (18th century)
- A Painting: Charity of Saint Martin (17th century)
- A Sculpture: Christ on the Cross (16th century)
- A Group Sculpture: Education of the Virgin (16th century)
- The Furniture in the Church of Saint Martin

The Parish Church of the Assumption at La Ville-aux-Bois also contains many items that are registered as historical objects:

- A Tombstone of Nicolas de Rochetaillée and his wife (1496)
- A Statue: Virgin and child (17th century)
- A Statue: Saint Sebastian (17th century)
- A Processional Staff: Virgin and child (18th century)
- A Statue: Saint Éloi (18th century)
- A Painting: Assumption (18th century)
- The main Altar, Retable, Tabernacle, and exhibition (18th century)
- A Statuette: Saint Nicolas (18th century)
- A Statuette: Saint Catherine (18th century)
- A Chest (18th century)
- A Sculpture: Christ on the Cross (17th century)
- A Monstrance (19th century)
- The Tombstone of Gaspard de Pons and his wife (1670)
- A Painting: Marriage of the Virgin (18th century)
- A Painting: Adoration of the Magii (17th century)
- A Painting: Flagellation (18th century)
- The Tombstone of Antoine de Mertrus (17th century)
- The Furniture in the Church of the Assumption
Church of Saint Martin

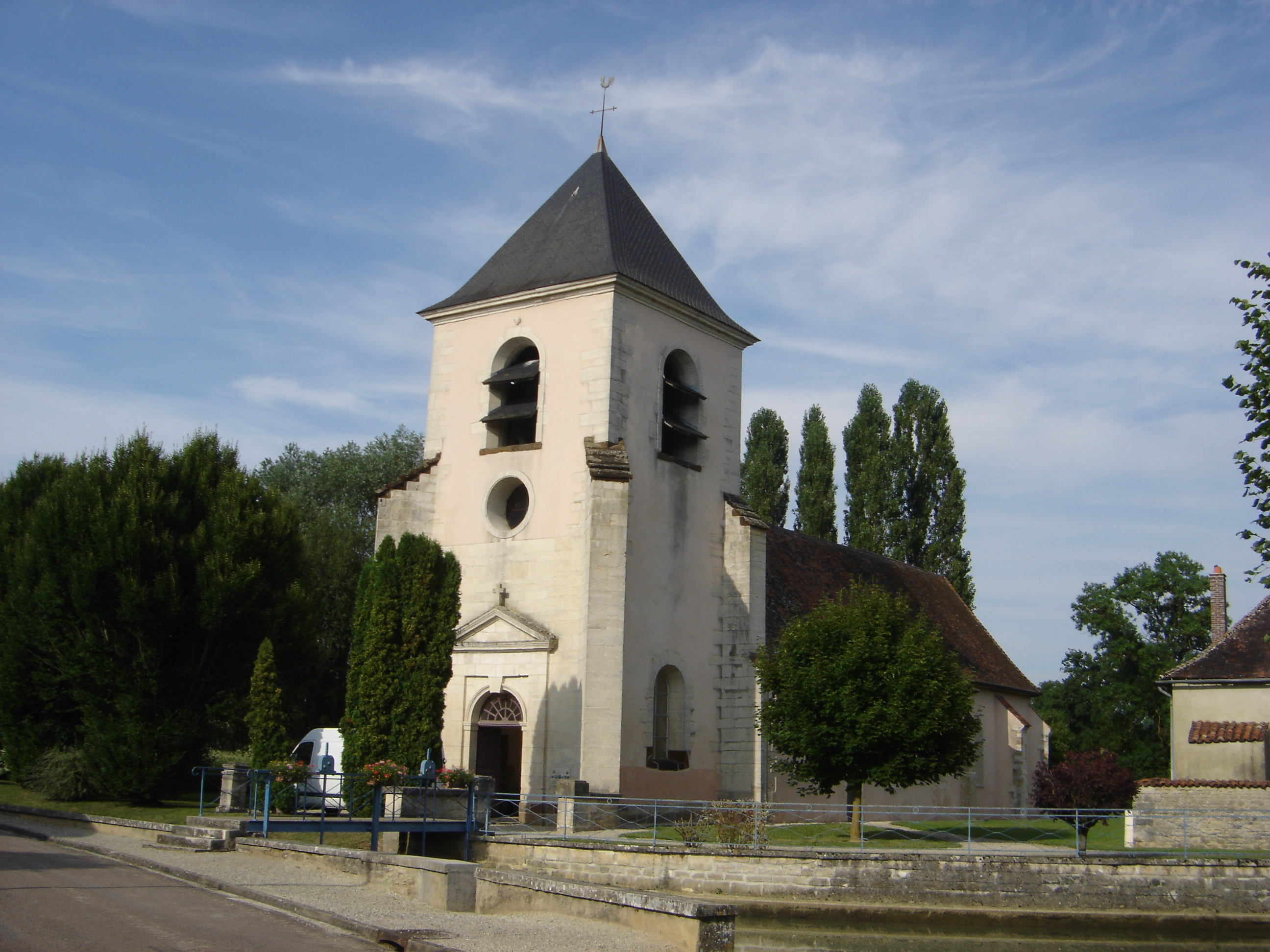

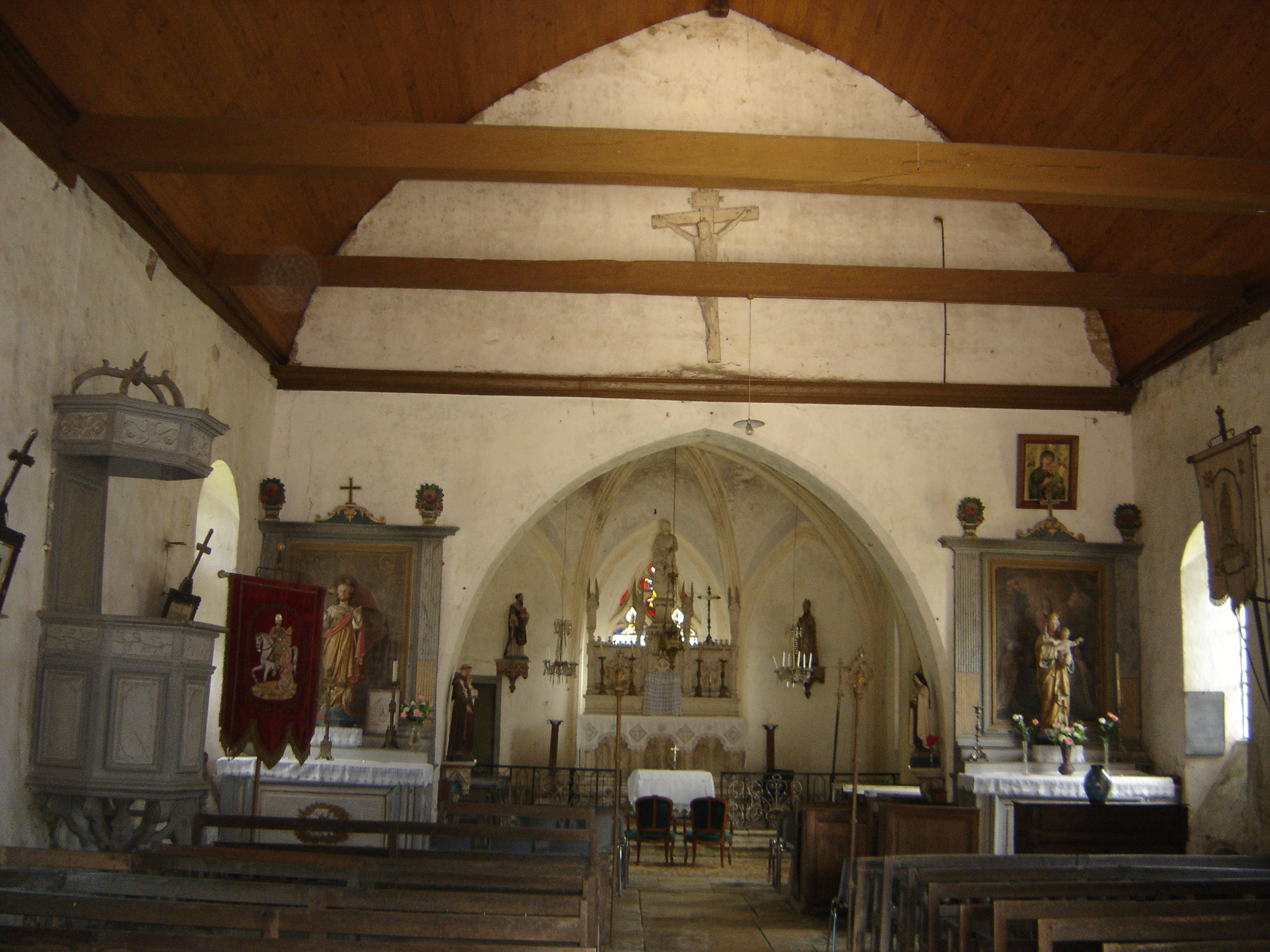
Church of the Assumption

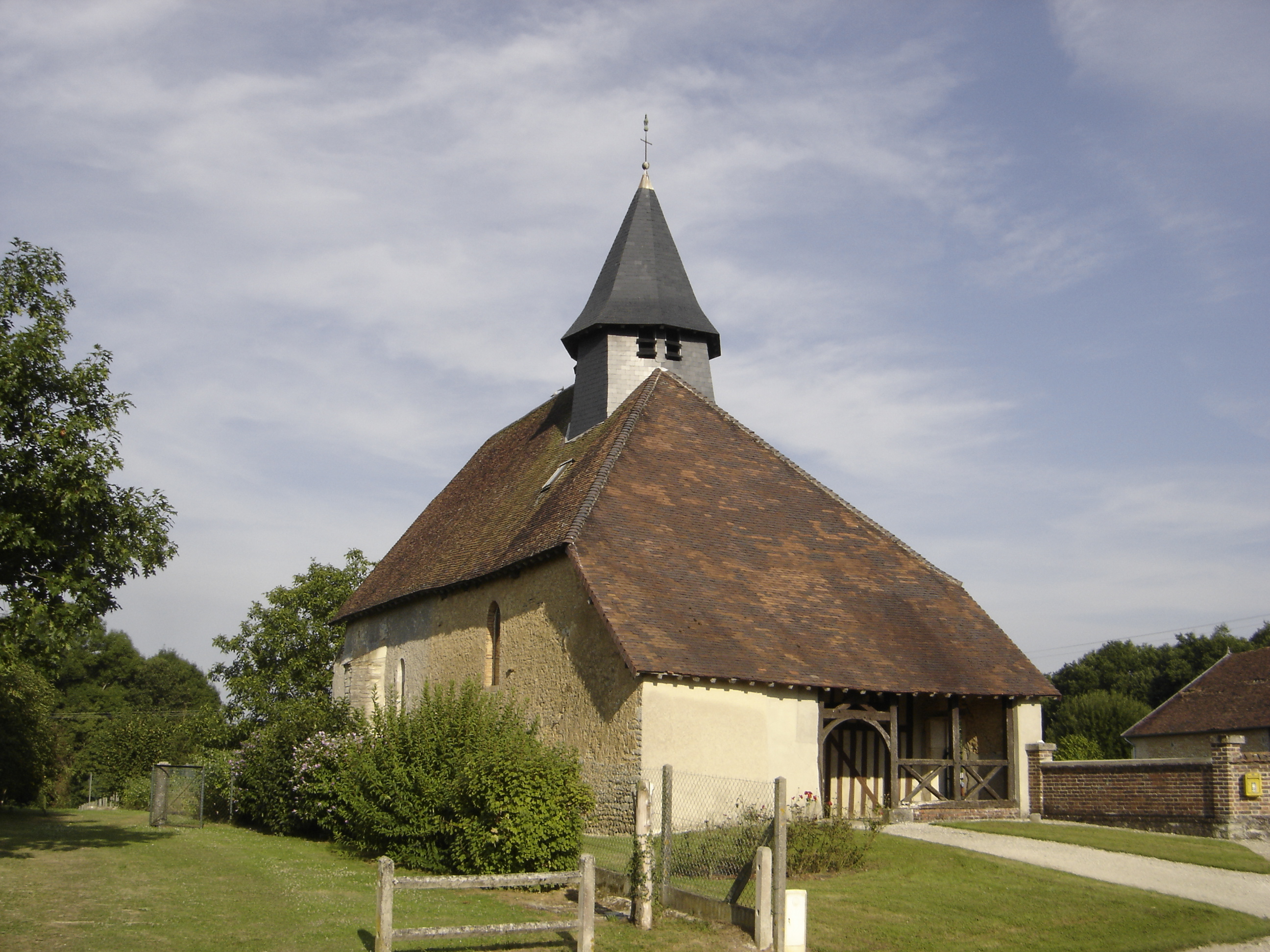

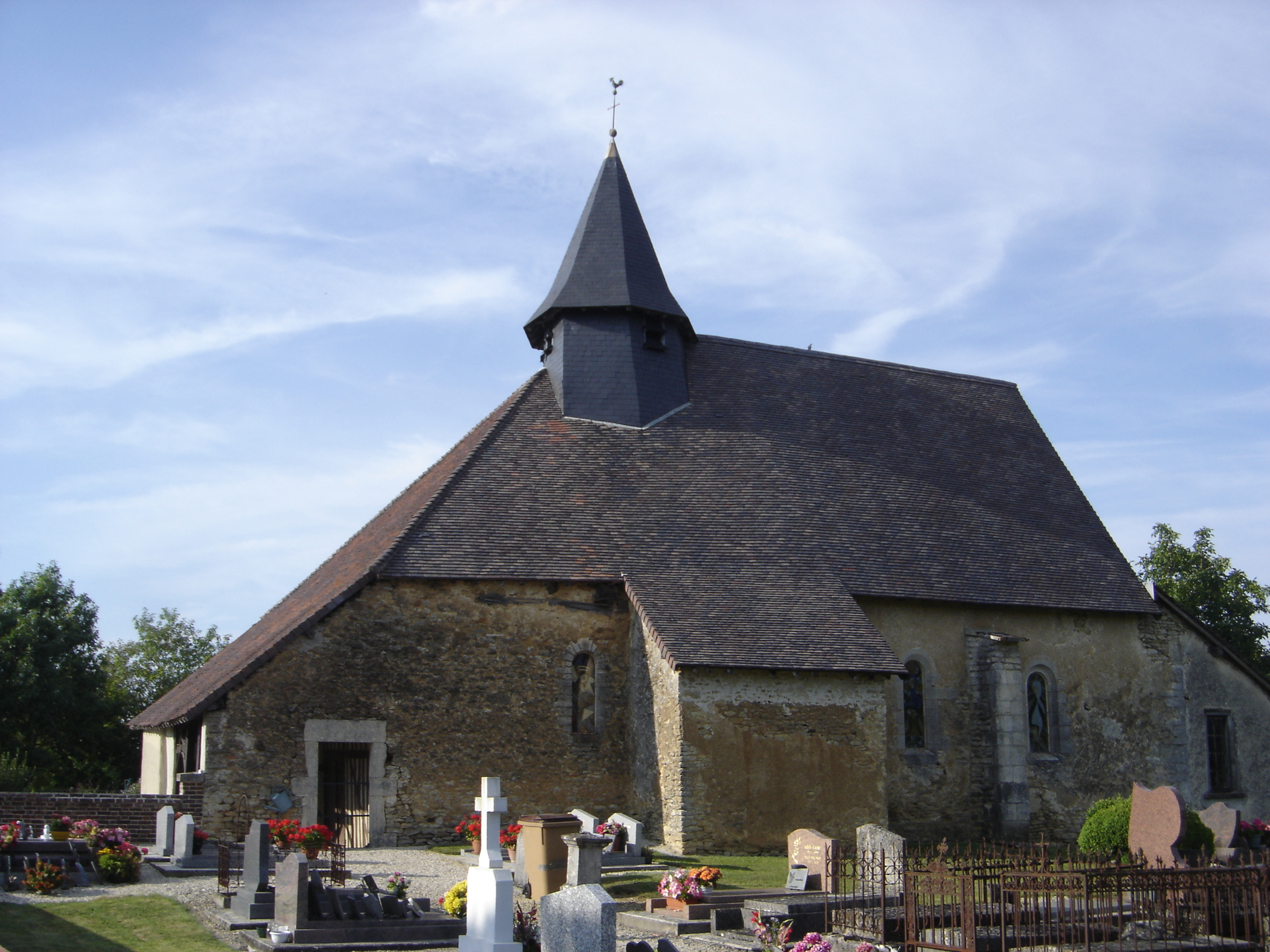

== See also ==
- Communes of the Aube department
- Orient Forest Regional Natural Park
