= Argançon =

Township in Grand Est, France

- Commune
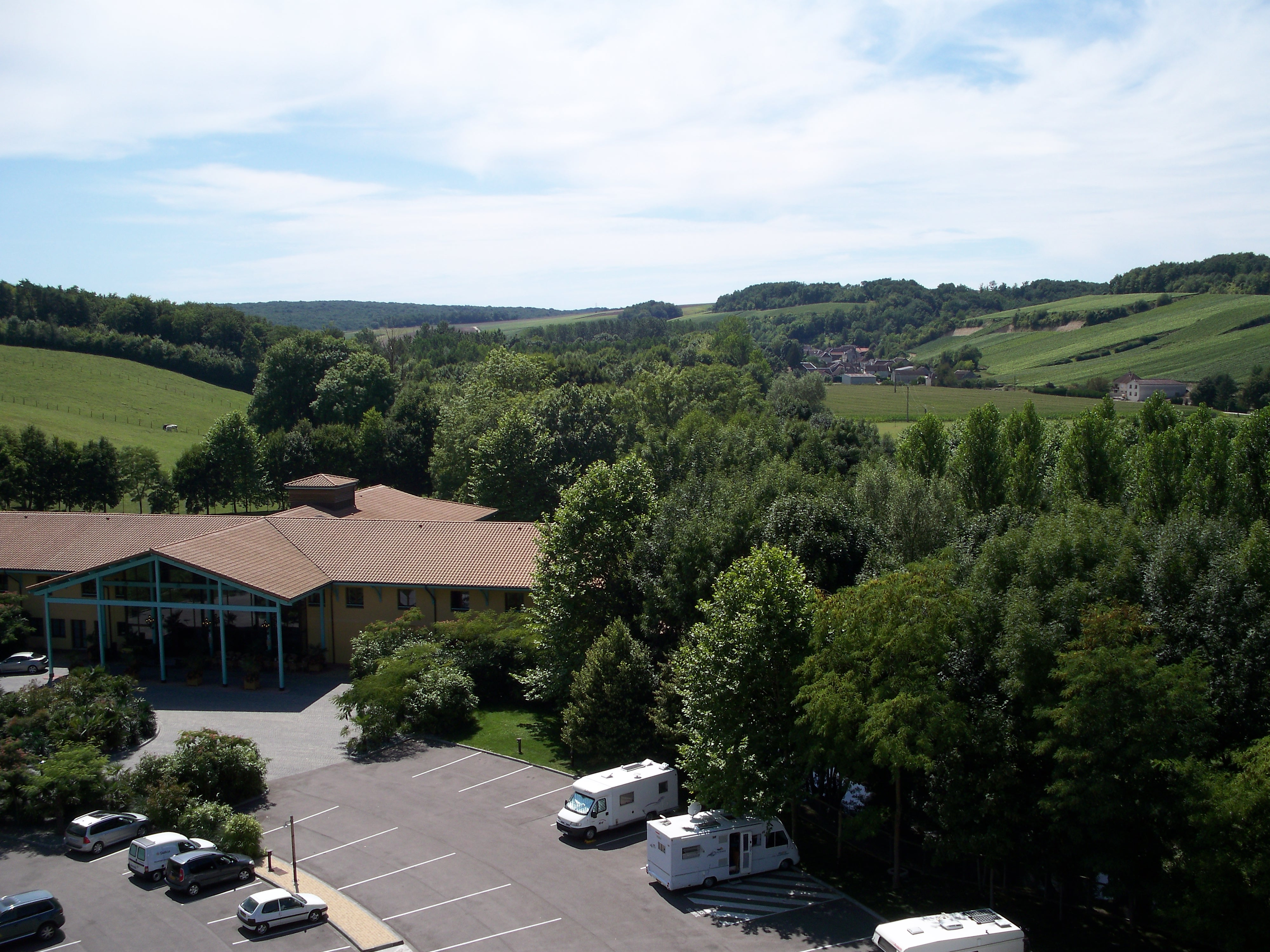
- View of Argançon from "Nigloland"
- Location of Argançon
- Location within France Location within Grand Est
- Coordinates: 48°15′14″N 4°36′16″E
- Country: France
- Region: Grand Est
- Department: Aube
- Arrondissement: Bar-sur-Aube
- Canton: Vendeuvre-sur-Barse
- Intercommunality: Vendeuvre-Soulaines

Government
  - Mayor (2020–2026): Rémi Tournemeulle
- Area^{1}: 8.2 km^{2} (3.2 sq mi)
- Elevation: 168 m (551 ft)
- Population (2023): 101
  - Density: 12/km^{2} (32/sq mi)
- Time zone: UTC+01:00 (CET)
  - Summer (DST): UTC+02:00 (CEST)
- INSEE/Postal code: 10008 /10140
- ^{1} French Land Register data, which excludes lakes, ponds, glaciers > 1 km^{2} (0.386 sq mi or 247 acres) and river estuaries.

Argançon (French pronunciation: [aʁɡɑ̃sɔ̃]) is a commune in the Aube department in the Grand Est region of north-central France.

== Geography ==
Argançon is located some 8 km east by north-east of Vendeuvre-sur-Barse and 8 km north-west of Bar-sur-Aube in the Orient Forest Regional Natural Park. Access to the commune is by highway D619 from Dolancourt in the north-east through the north of the commune to Magny-Fouchard in the west. Access to the village is by the D44 from Dolancourt passing through the village and continuing south to Spoy. There is also the D144 road from the village to the hamlet of Le Chanet in the north of the commune. Two thirds of the commune is farmland with the rest heavily forested in the east and the south.

The Landion river flows through the commune from south to north passing through the village and continuing north to join the Aube just north of Dolancourt.

== Administration ==
List of Successive Mayors

From	To	Name	Party
	1857	Jouy-Jeanson	
2001		Remi Tournemeulle	DVD
2014	2026	Alain Baudouin	
2026	Incumbent	Remi Tournemeulle	DVD

== Population ==
Historical population
Year	Pop.	±% p.a.
1968	130	—
1975	135	+0.54%
1982	118	−1.90%
1990	117	−0.11%
1999	113	−0.39%
2007	105	−0.91%
2012	99	−1.17%
2017	108	+1.76%
2023	101	−1.11%
Source: INSEE

== Sites and monuments ==
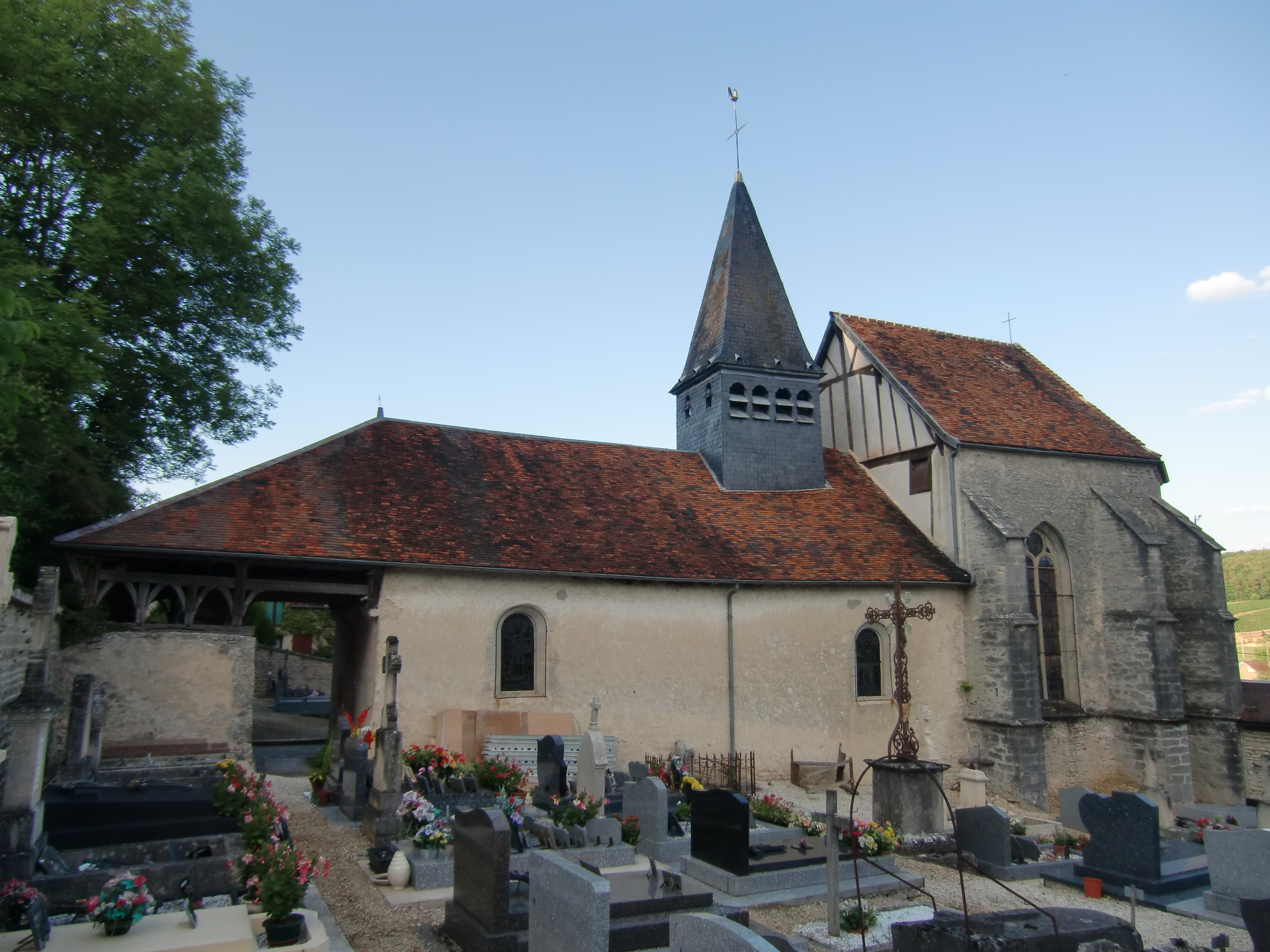
Church of Saint-Pierre-ès-Liens

The Church of Saint-Pierre-ès-Liens has a Romanesque nave and a sanctuary rebuilt in the 16th century. It contains many items that are registered as historical objects:

- The Tombstone of Jean de la Salle (1649)
- The Tombstone of Charles le Roux (1681)
- A Tombstone (disappeared) (1655)
- A Bust (16th century)
- A Monstrance with box (19th century)
- 2 Ciboriums (19th century)
- Chalices and Patens (19th century)
- A Processional Staff: Saint Nicolas (19th century)
- A Processional Staff: Saint Peter (18th century)
- A Processional Staff: Saint Éloi (19th century)
- An Altar and Retable of Saint Nicolas (18th century)
- A Bronze Bell (1779)
- The Furniture in the Church

== See also ==
- Communes of the Aube department
- Orient Forest Regional Natural Park

=== External links ===
- Argançon on the National Geographic Institute website (in French)
- Argançon on Géoportail, National Geographic Institute (IGN) website (in French)
- Argançon on the 1750 Cassini Map
