= Moussey, Aube =

Commune in Grand Est, France

Moussey
- Commune
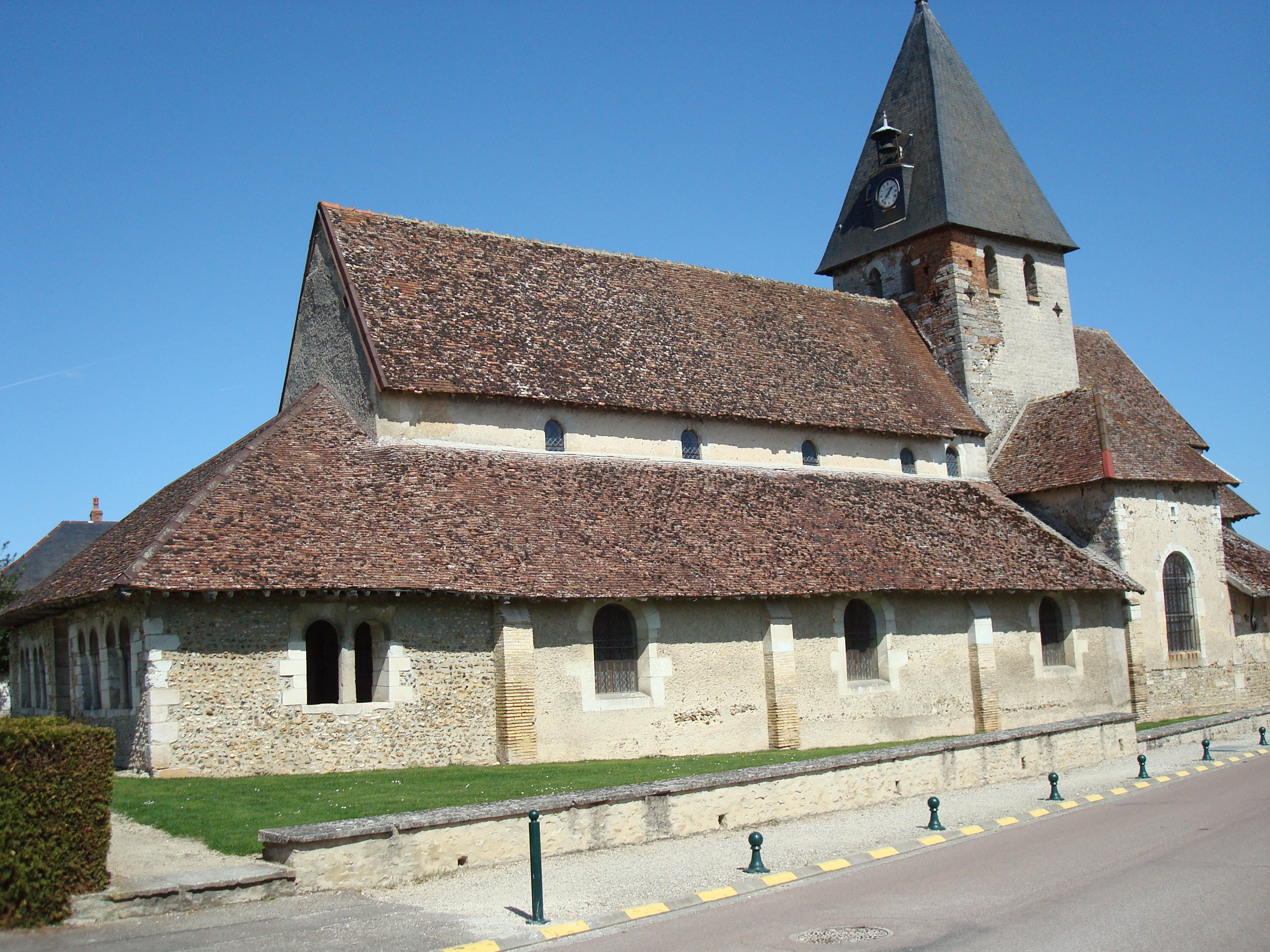
- The church in Moussey

- Coat of arms
- Location of Moussey
- Location within France Location within Grand Est
- Coordinates: 48°12′54″N 4°05′46″E
- Country: France
- Region: Grand Est
- Department: Aube
- Arrondissement: Troyes
- Canton: Vendeuvre-sur-Barse
- Intercommunality: CA Troyes Champagne Métropole

Government
  - Mayor (2020–2026): Bruno Farine
- Area^{1}: 7.25 km^{2} (2.80 sq mi)
- Elevation: 131 m (430 ft)
- Population (2023): 656
  - Density: 90.5/km^{2} (234/sq mi)
- Time zone: UTC+01:00 (CET)
  - Summer (DST): UTC+02:00 (CEST)
- INSEE/Postal code: 10260 /10800
- ^{1} French Land Register data, which excludes lakes, ponds, glaciers > 1 km^{2} (0.386 sq mi or 247 acres) and river estuaries.

Moussey (French pronunciation: [musɛ]) is a commune in the Aube department in north-central France.

== Population ==
Historical population
Year	Pop.	±% p.a.
1968	271	—
1975	277	+0.31%
1982	411	+5.80%
1990	398	−0.40%
1999	399	+0.03%
2007	496	+2.76%
2012	597	+3.78%
2017	638	+1.34%
2023	656	+0.46%
Source: INSEE

== See also ==
- Communes of the Aube department
