= Montmartin-le-Haut =

Commune in Grand Est, France

- Commune
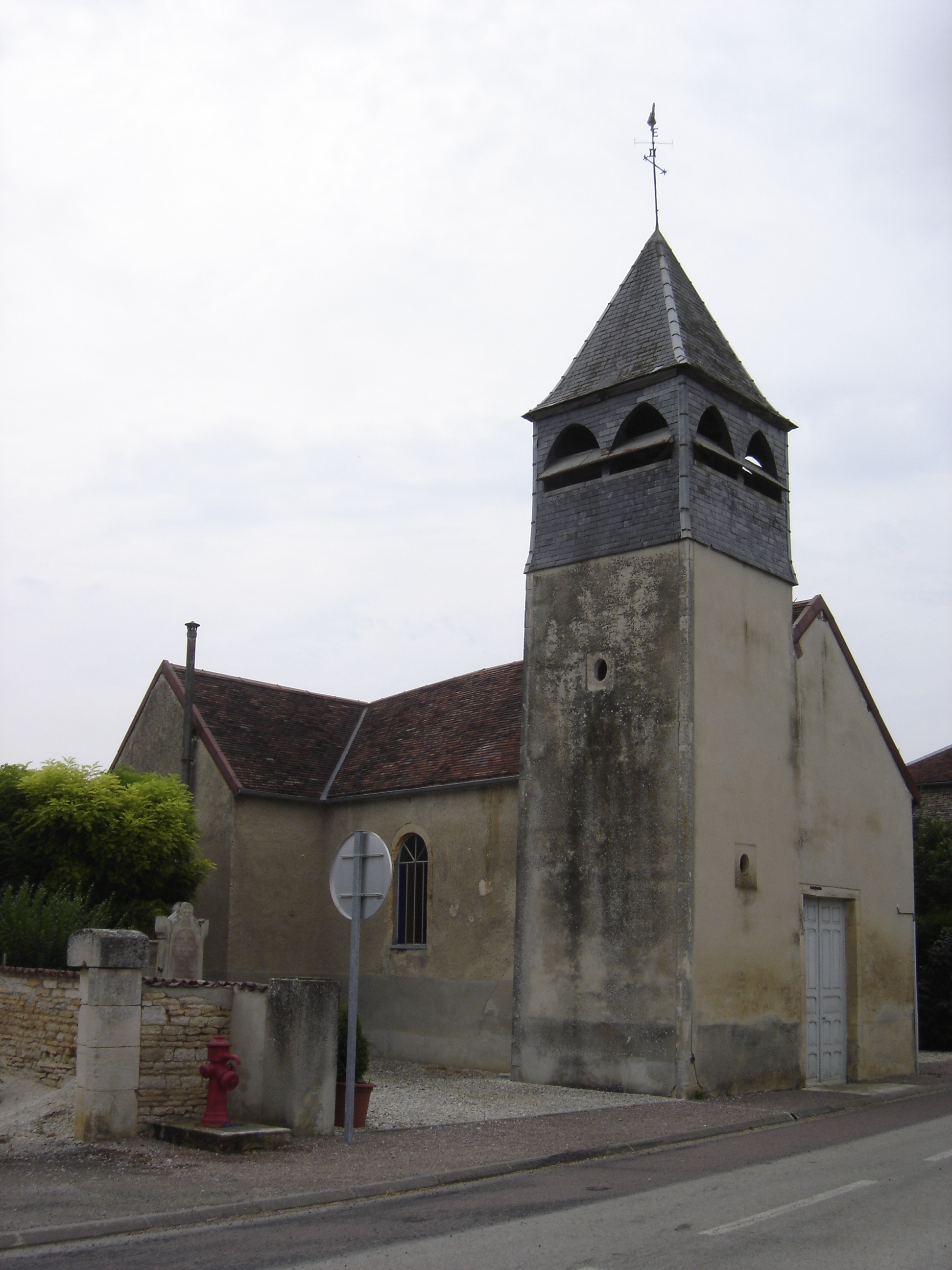
- The church in Montmartin-le-Haut
- Location of Montmartin-le-Haut
- Location within France Location within Grand Est
- Coordinates: 48°12′32″N 4°33′12″E
- Country: France
- Region: Grand Est
- Department: Aube
- Arrondissement: Bar-sur-Aube
- Canton: Vendeuvre-sur-Barse

Government
  - Mayor (2020–2026): Pascal Blouquin
- Area^{1}: 1.61 km^{2} (0.62 sq mi)
- Elevation: 262 m (860 ft)
- Population (2023): 62
  - Density: 39/km^{2} (100/sq mi)
- Time zone: UTC+01:00 (CET)
  - Summer (DST): UTC+02:00 (CEST)
- INSEE/Postal code: 10252 /10140
- ^{1} French Land Register data, which excludes lakes, ponds, glaciers > 1 km^{2} (0.386 sq mi or 247 acres) and river estuaries.

Montmartin-le-Haut (French pronunciation: [mɔ̃maʁtɛ̃ lə o]) is a commune in the Aube department in north-central France.

== Population ==
Historical population
Year	Pop.	±% p.a.
1968	89	—
1975	76	−2.23%
1982	69	−1.37%
1990	45	−5.20%
1999	57	+2.66%
2007	56	−0.22%
2012	58	+0.70%
2017	53	−1.79%
2023	62	+2.65%
Source: INSEE

== See also ==
- Communes of the Aube department
