= Montaulin =

Commune in Grand Est, France

- Commune
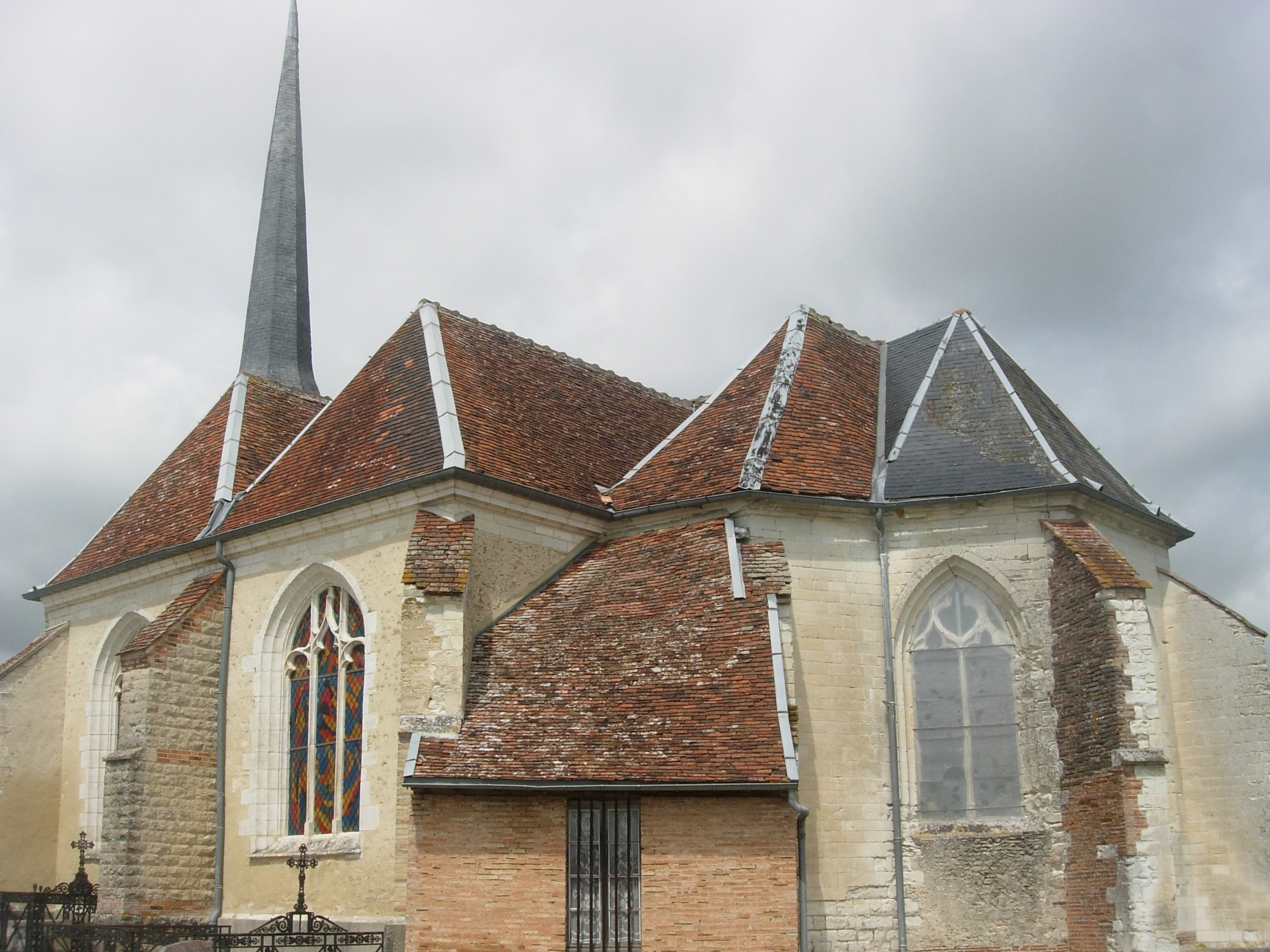
- The church in Montaulin

- Coat of arms
- Location of Montaulin
- Location within France Location within Grand Est
- Coordinates: 48°15′14″N 4°11′46″E
- Country: France
- Region: Grand Est
- Department: Aube
- Arrondissement: Troyes
- Canton: Vendeuvre-sur-Barse
- Intercommunality: CA Troyes Champagne Métropole

Government
  - Mayor (2020–2026): Rémy Marty
- Area^{1}: 12.41 km^{2} (4.79 sq mi)
- Elevation: 114 m (374 ft)
- Population (2023): 825
  - Density: 66.5/km^{2} (172/sq mi)
- Time zone: UTC+01:00 (CET)
  - Summer (DST): UTC+02:00 (CEST)
- INSEE/Postal code: 10245 /10270
- ^{1} French Land Register data, which excludes lakes, ponds, glaciers > 1 km^{2} (0.386 sq mi or 247 acres) and river estuaries.

Montaulin (French pronunciation: [mɔ̃tolɛ̃]) is a commune in the Aube department in north-central France.

== Geography ==
The Barse flows through the commune.

== Population ==
The inhabitants of the town of Montaulin are Montaulinois.

Historical population
Year	Pop.	±% p.a.
1968	374	—
1975	388	+0.53%
1982	538	+4.78%
1990	573	+0.79%
1999	627	+1.01%
2007	711	+1.58%
2012	792	+2.18%
2017	807	+0.38%
2023	825	+0.37%
Source: INSEE

== See also ==
- Communes of the Aube department
