= Bouranton =

Commune in Grand Est, France

- Commune
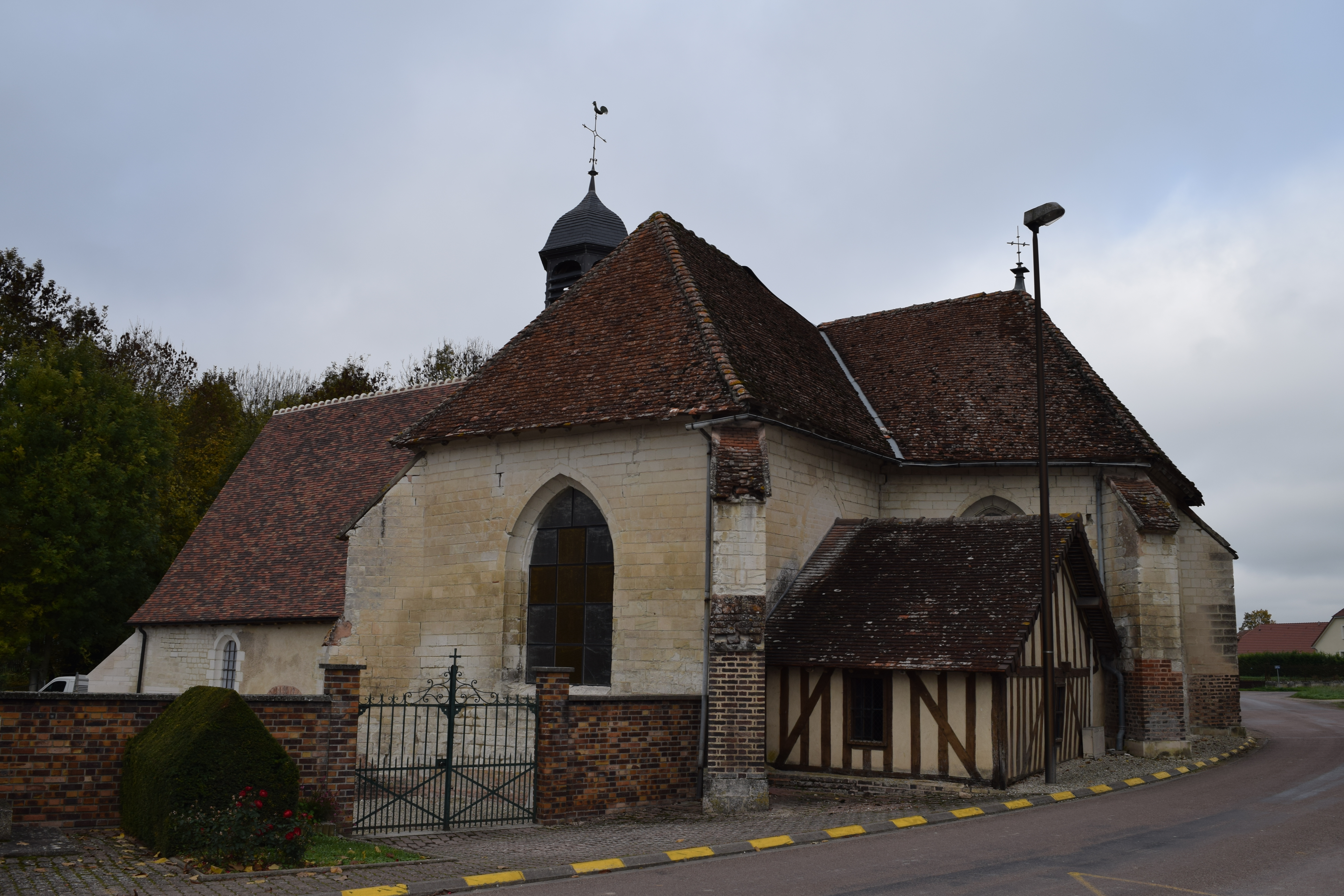
- The church in Bouranton

- Coat of arms
- Location of Bouranton
- Location within France Location within Grand Est
- Coordinates: 48°18′43″N 4°10′51″E
- Country: France
- Region: Grand Est
- Department: Aube
- Arrondissement: Troyes
- Canton: Vendeuvre-sur-Barse
- Intercommunality: CA Troyes Champagne Métropole

Government
  - Mayor (2020–2026): Michel Volhuer
- Area^{1}: 8.15 km^{2} (3.15 sq mi)
- Elevation: 124 m (407 ft)
- Population (2023): 633
  - Density: 77.7/km^{2} (201/sq mi)
- Time zone: UTC+01:00 (CET)
  - Summer (DST): UTC+02:00 (CEST)
- INSEE/Postal code: 10053 /10270
- ^{1} French Land Register data, which excludes lakes, ponds, glaciers > 1 km^{2} (0.386 sq mi or 247 acres) and river estuaries.

Bouranton (French pronunciation: [buʁɑ̃tɔ̃]) is a commune in the Aube department in north-central France.

== Population ==
Historical population
Year	Pop.	±% p.a.
1968	186	—
1975	218	+2.29%
1982	440	+10.55%
1990	475	+0.96%
1999	451	−0.57%
2007	498	+1.25%
2012	534	+1.41%
2017	572	+1.38%
2023	633	+1.70%
Source: INSEE

== See also ==
- Communes of the Aube department
- Parc naturel régional de la Forêt d'Orient
