= Beurey =

Commune in Grand Est, France

- Commune
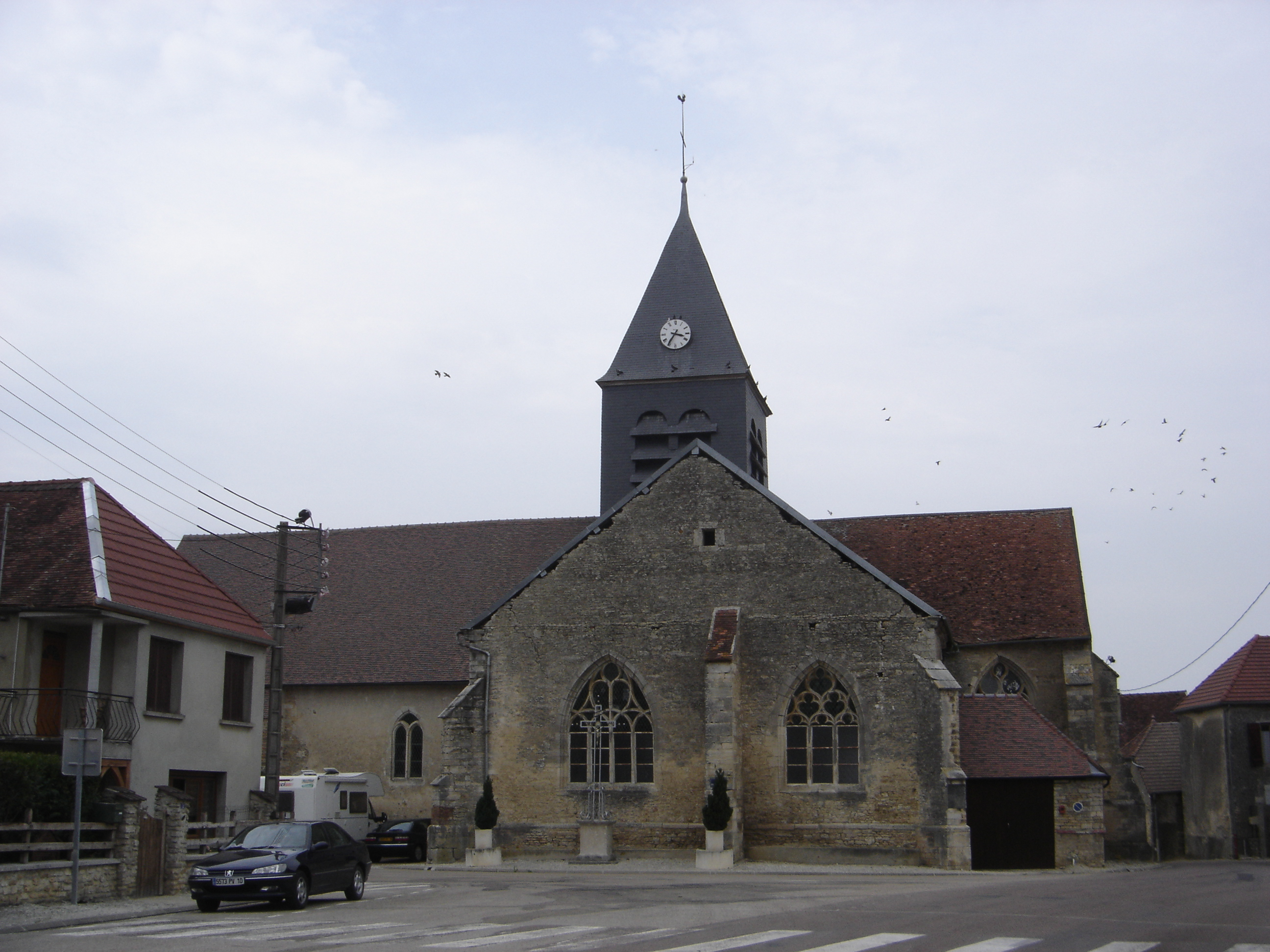
- The church in Beurey
- Location of Beurey
- Location within France Location within Grand Est
- Coordinates: 48°11′05″N 4°28′02″E
- Country: France
- Region: Grand Est
- Department: Aube
- Arrondissement: Bar-sur-Aube
- Canton: Vendeuvre-sur-Barse

Government
  - Mayor (2020–2026): Laurent Carric
- Area^{1}: 17.33 km^{2} (6.69 sq mi)
- Elevation: 243 m (797 ft)
- Population (2023): 176
  - Density: 10.2/km^{2} (26.3/sq mi)
- Time zone: UTC+01:00 (CET)
  - Summer (DST): UTC+02:00 (CEST)
- INSEE/Postal code: 10045 /10140
- ^{1} French Land Register data, which excludes lakes, ponds, glaciers > 1 km^{2} (0.386 sq mi or 247 acres) and river estuaries.

Beurey (French pronunciation: [bøʁɛ]) is a commune in the Aube department in north-central France.

== Population ==
Historical population
Year	Pop.	±% p.a.
1968	229	—
1975	212	−1.10%
1982	178	−2.47%
1990	166	−0.87%
1999	171	+0.33%
2007	185	+0.99%
2012	189	+0.43%
2017	195	+0.63%
2023	176	−1.69%
Source: INSEE

== See also ==
- Communes of the Aube department
