= Puits-et-Nuisement =

Commune in Grand Est, France

- Commune
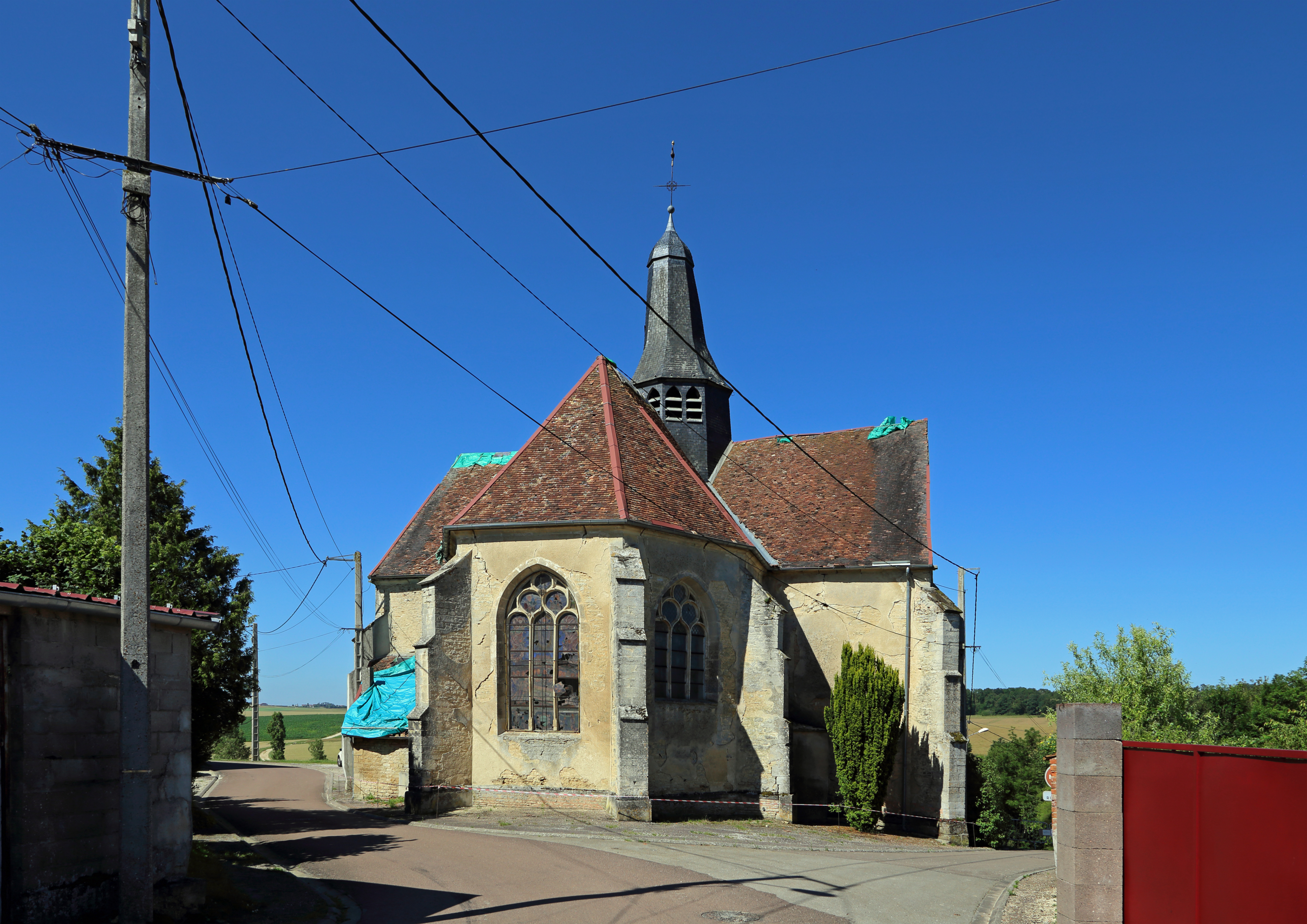
- The church in Puits
- Location of Puits-et-Nuisement
- Location within France Location within Grand Est
- Coordinates: 48°12′48″N 4°30′00″E
- Country: France
- Region: Grand Est
- Department: Aube
- Arrondissement: Bar-sur-Aube
- Canton: Vendeuvre-sur-Barse

Government
  - Mayor (2020–2026): Hervé Gobin
- Area^{1}: 12.19 km^{2} (4.71 sq mi)
- Elevation: 205 m (673 ft)
- Population (2023): 201
  - Density: 16.5/km^{2} (42.7/sq mi)
- Time zone: UTC+01:00 (CET)
  - Summer (DST): UTC+02:00 (CEST)
- INSEE/Postal code: 10310 /10140
- ^{1} French Land Register data, which excludes lakes, ponds, glaciers > 1 km^{2} (0.386 sq mi or 247 acres) and river estuaries.

Puits-et-Nuisement (French pronunciation: [pɥi e nɥizmɑ̃]) is a commune in the Aube department in north-central France.

== Population ==
Historical population
| Year | Pop. | ±% p.a. |
|---|---|---|
| 1968 | 209 | — |
| 1975 | 182 | −1.96% |
| 1982 | 210 | +2.07% |
| 1990 | 204 | −0.36% |
| 1999 | 192 | −0.67% |
| 2007 | 200 | +0.51% |
| 2012 | 208 | +0.79% |
| 2017 | 214 | +0.57% |
| 2023 | 201 | −1.04% |
Source: INSEE

== See also ==
- Communes of the Aube department
- Parc naturel régional de la Forêt d'Orient
