= Thennelières =

Commune in Grand Est, France

- Commune
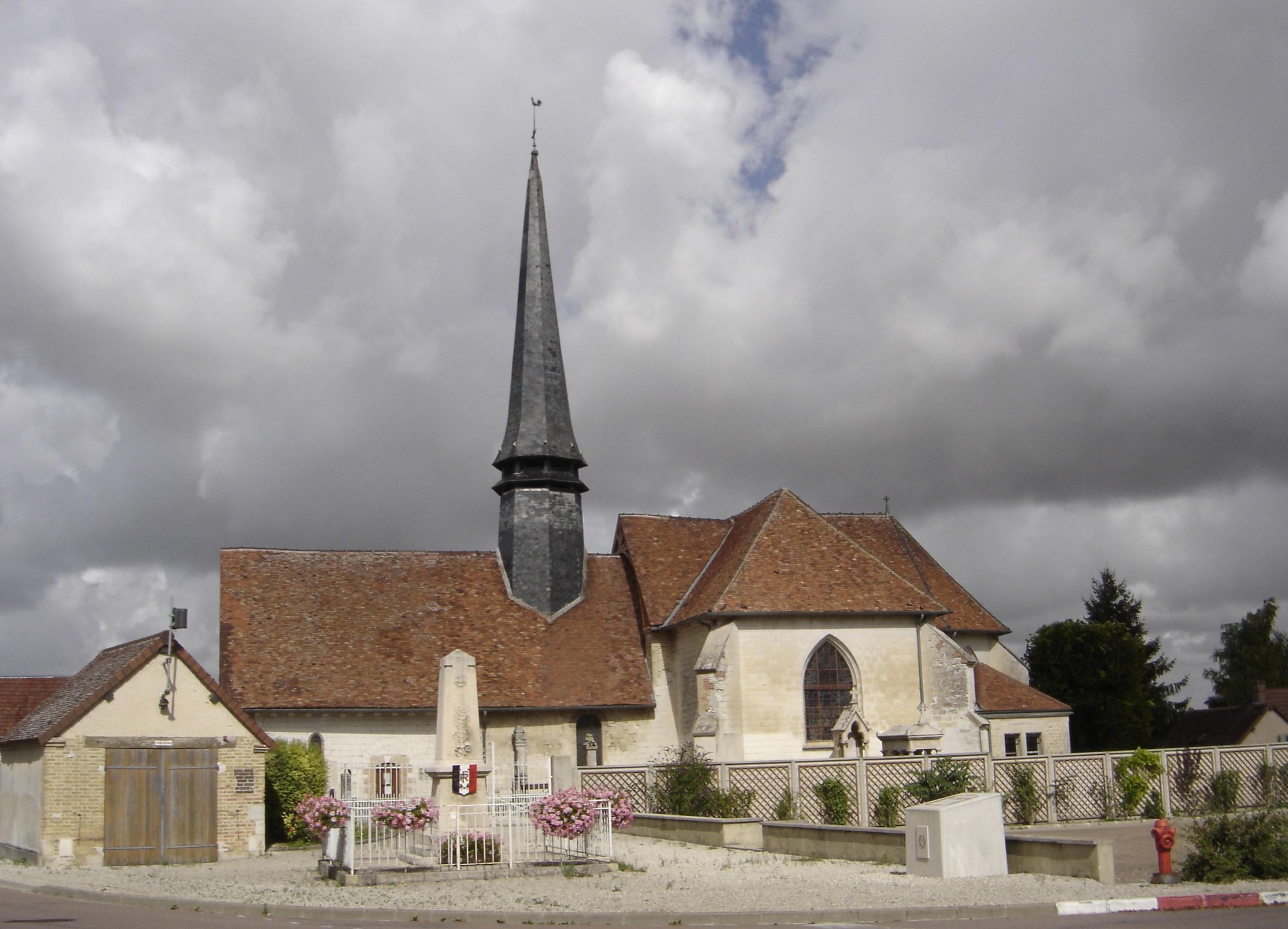
- The church in Thennelières

- Coat of arms
- Location of Thennelières
- Location within France Location within Grand Est
- Coordinates: 48°17′27″N 4°10′38″E
- Country: France
- Region: Grand Est
- Department: Aube
- Arrondissement: Troyes
- Canton: Vendeuvre-sur-Barse
- Intercommunality: CA Troyes Champagne Métropole

Government
  - Mayor (2020–2026): Bernard Roblet
- Area^{1}: 6.73 km^{2} (2.60 sq mi)
- Elevation: 120 m (390 ft)
- Population (2023): 341
  - Density: 50.7/km^{2} (131/sq mi)
- Time zone: UTC+01:00 (CET)
  - Summer (DST): UTC+02:00 (CEST)
- INSEE/Postal code: 10375 /10410
- ^{1} French Land Register data, which excludes lakes, ponds, glaciers > 1 km^{2} (0.386 sq mi or 247 acres) and river estuaries.

Thennelières (French pronunciation: [tɛnljɛʁ]) is a commune in the Aube department in north-central France.

== Population ==
Historical population
Year	Pop.	±% p.a.
1968	181	—
1975	238	+3.99%
1982	245	+0.41%
1990	248	+0.15%
1999	267	+0.82%
2007	329	+2.64%
2012	342	+0.78%
2017	338	−0.24%
2023	341	+0.15%
Source: INSEE

== See also ==
- Communes of the Aube department
- Parc naturel régional de la Forêt d'Orient
