= Longpré-le-Sec =

Commune in Grand Est, France

- Commune
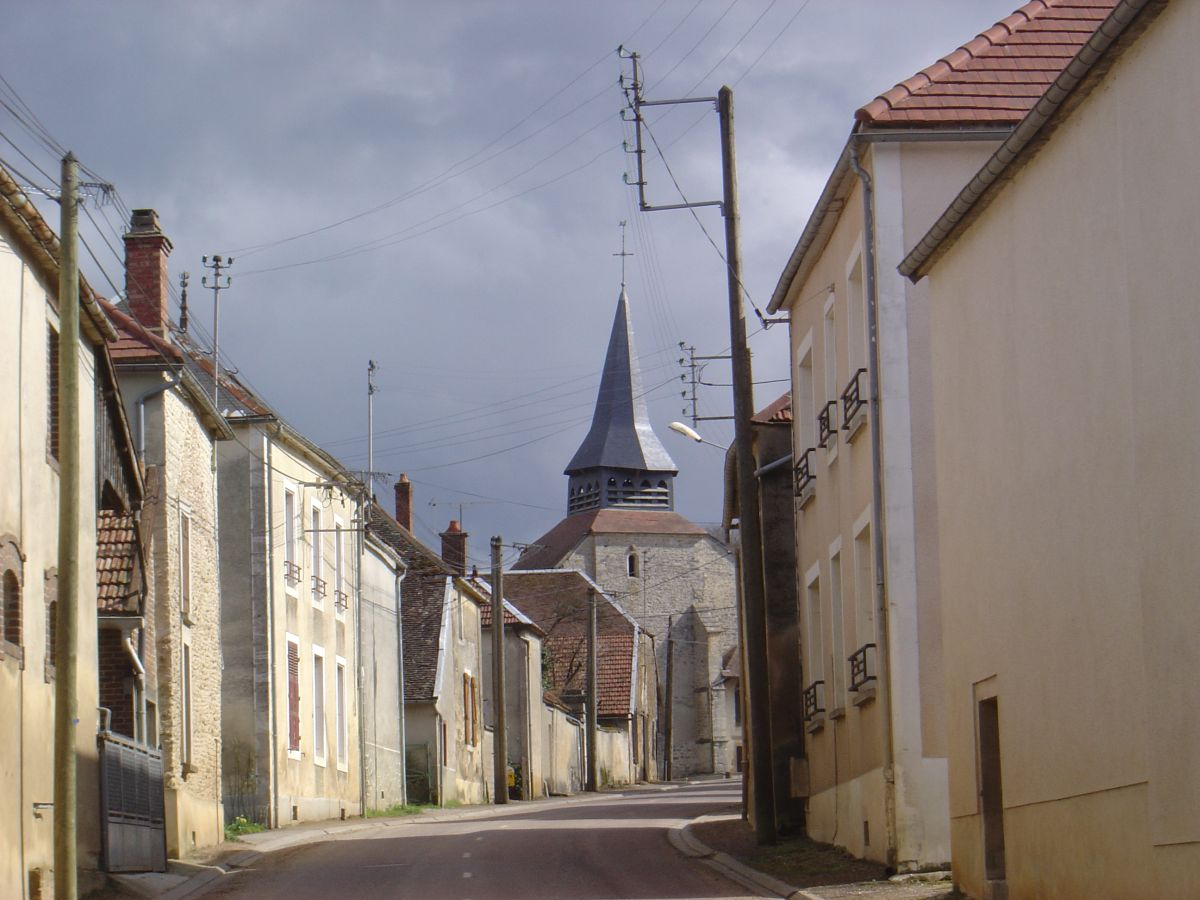
- The main road in Longpré-le-Sec
- Location of Longpré-le-Sec
- Location within France Location within Grand Est
- Coordinates: 48°11′18″N 4°31′30″E
- Country: France
- Region: Grand Est
- Department: Aube
- Arrondissement: Bar-sur-Aube
- Canton: Vendeuvre-sur-Barse

Government
  - Mayor (2020–2026): Alexandre Mocquart
- Area^{1}: 15.71 km^{2} (6.07 sq mi)
- Elevation: 211 m (692 ft)
- Population (2023): 67
  - Density: 4.3/km^{2} (11/sq mi)
- Time zone: UTC+01:00 (CET)
  - Summer (DST): UTC+02:00 (CEST)
- INSEE/Postal code: 10205 /10140
- ^{1} French Land Register data, which excludes lakes, ponds, glaciers > 1 km^{2} (0.386 sq mi or 247 acres) and river estuaries.

Longpré-le-Sec (French pronunciation: [lɔ̃pʁe lə sɛk]) is a commune in the Aube department in north-central France.

== Population ==
Historical population
| Year | Pop. | ±% p.a. |
|---|---|---|
| 1968 | 129 | — |
| 1975 | 108 | −2.51% |
| 1982 | 100 | −1.09% |
| 1990 | 92 | −1.04% |
| 1999 | 80 | −1.54% |
| 2007 | 85 | +0.76% |
| 2012 | 71 | −3.54% |
| 2017 | 85 | +3.66% |
| 2023 | 67 | −3.89% |
Source: INSEE

== See also ==
- Communes of the Aube department
