= Saint-Léger-près-Troyes =

Commune in Grand Est, France

- Commune
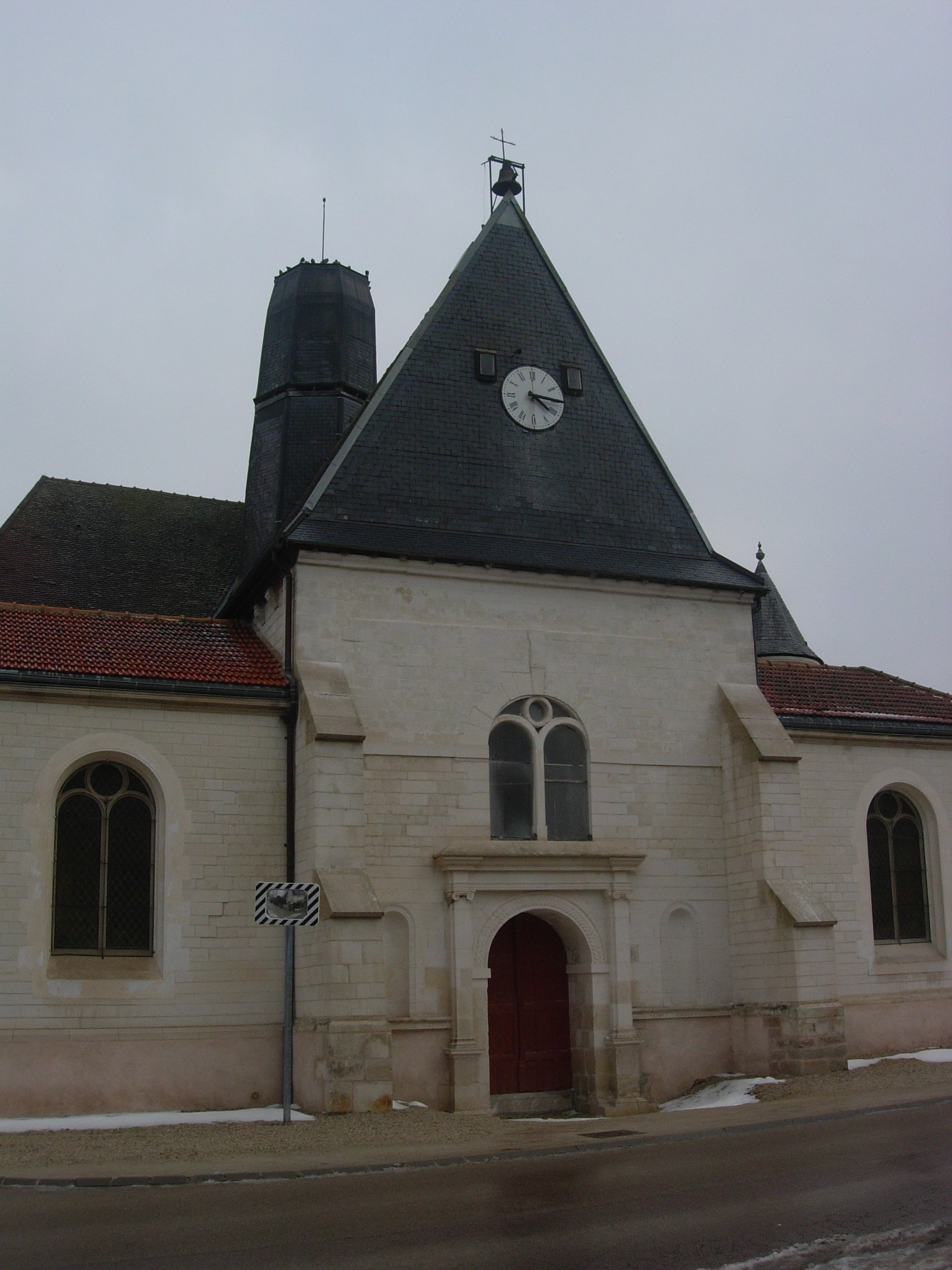
- The church in Saint-Léger-près-Troyes

- Coat of arms
- Location of Saint-Léger-près-Troyes
- Location within France Location within Grand Est
- Coordinates: 48°14′15″N 4°04′43″E
- Country: France
- Region: Grand Est
- Department: Aube
- Arrondissement: Troyes
- Canton: Vendeuvre-sur-Barse
- Intercommunality: CA Troyes Champagne Métropole

Government
  - Mayor (2020–2026): Christian Blasson
- Area^{1}: 9.21 km^{2} (3.56 sq mi)
- Elevation: 120 m (390 ft)
- Population (2023): 903
  - Density: 98.0/km^{2} (254/sq mi)
- Time zone: UTC+01:00 (CET)
  - Summer (DST): UTC+02:00 (CEST)
- INSEE/Postal code: 10344 /10800
- ^{1} French Land Register data, which excludes lakes, ponds, glaciers > 1 km^{2} (0.386 sq mi or 247 acres) and river estuaries.

Saint-Léger-près-Troyes (French pronunciation: [sɛ̃ leʒe pʁɛ tʁwa], literally 'Saint-Léger near Troyes') is a commune in the Aube department in north-central France.

== Population ==
Historical population
Year	Pop.	±% p.a.
1968	393	—
1975	416	+0.82%
1982	564	+4.44%
1990	642	+1.63%
1999	615	−0.48%
2007	671	+1.10%
2012	763	+2.60%
2017	880	+2.89%
2023	903	+0.43%
Source: INSEE

== See also ==
- Communes of the Aube department
