= Fresnoy-le-Château =

Commune in Grand Est, France

- Commune
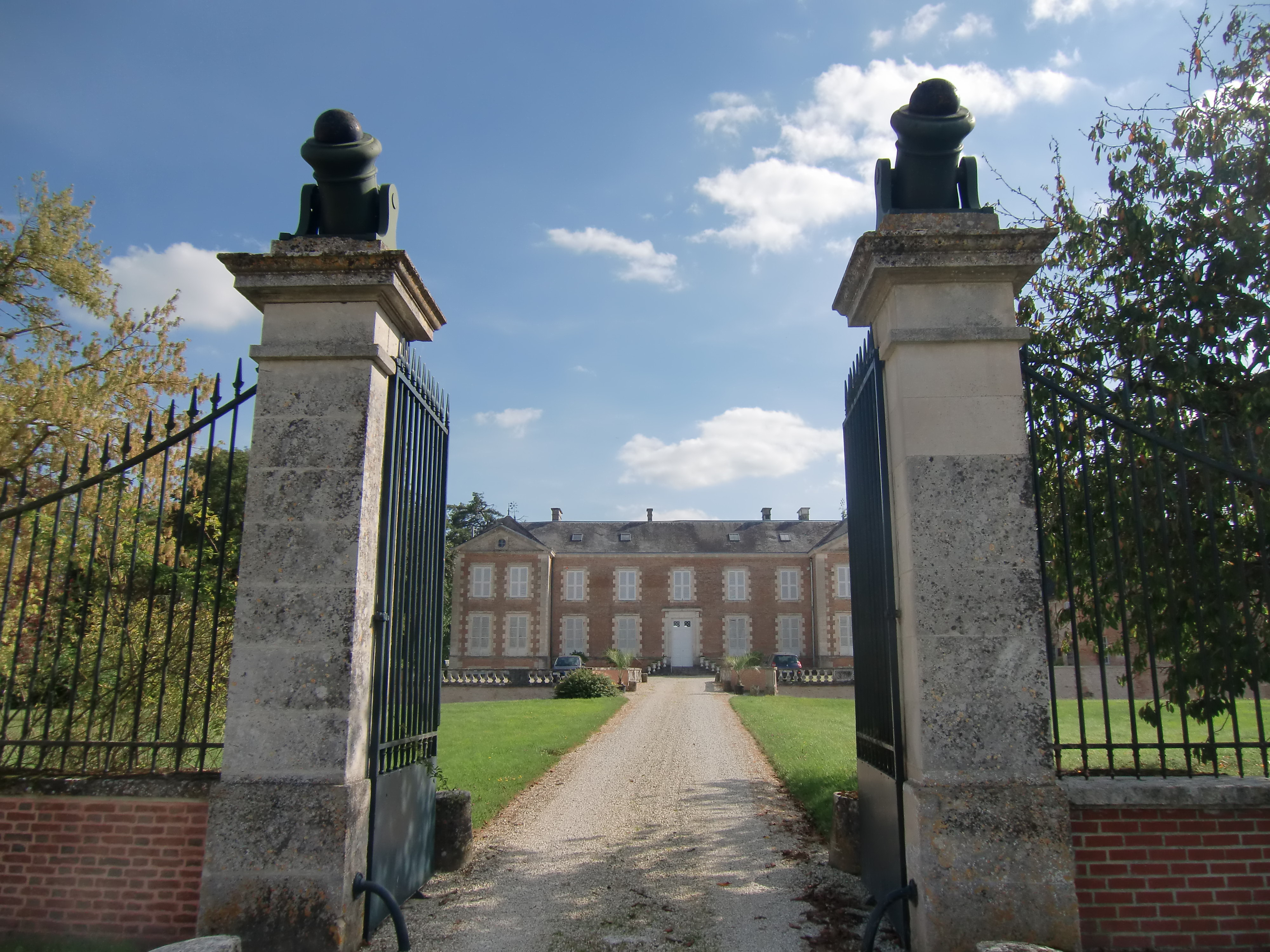
- Chateau
- Location of Fresnoy-le-Château
- Location within France Location within Grand Est
- Coordinates: 48°12′37″N 4°13′30″E
- Country: France
- Region: Grand Est
- Department: Aube
- Arrondissement: Troyes
- Canton: Vendeuvre-sur-Barse
- Intercommunality: CA Troyes Champagne Métropole

Government
  - Mayor (2020–2026): André Butat
- Area^{1}: 11.48 km^{2} (4.43 sq mi)
- Elevation: 153 m (502 ft)
- Population (2023): 269
  - Density: 23.4/km^{2} (60.7/sq mi)
- Time zone: UTC+01:00 (CET)
  - Summer (DST): UTC+02:00 (CEST)
- INSEE/Postal code: 10162 /10270
- ^{1} French Land Register data, which excludes lakes, ponds, glaciers > 1 km^{2} (0.386 sq mi or 247 acres) and river estuaries.

Fresnoy-le-Château (French pronunciation: [fʁɛnwa l(ə) ʃɑto]) is a commune in the Aube department in north-central France.

== Population ==
Historical population
Year	Pop.	±% p.a.
1968	213	—
1975	210	−0.20%
1982	194	−1.13%
1990	211	+1.06%
1999	223	+0.62%
2007	242	+1.03%
2012	252	+0.81%
2017	279	+2.06%
2023	269	−0.61%
Source: INSEE

== See also ==
- Communes of the Aube department
