= Maison-des-Champs =

Commune in Grand Est, France

- Commune
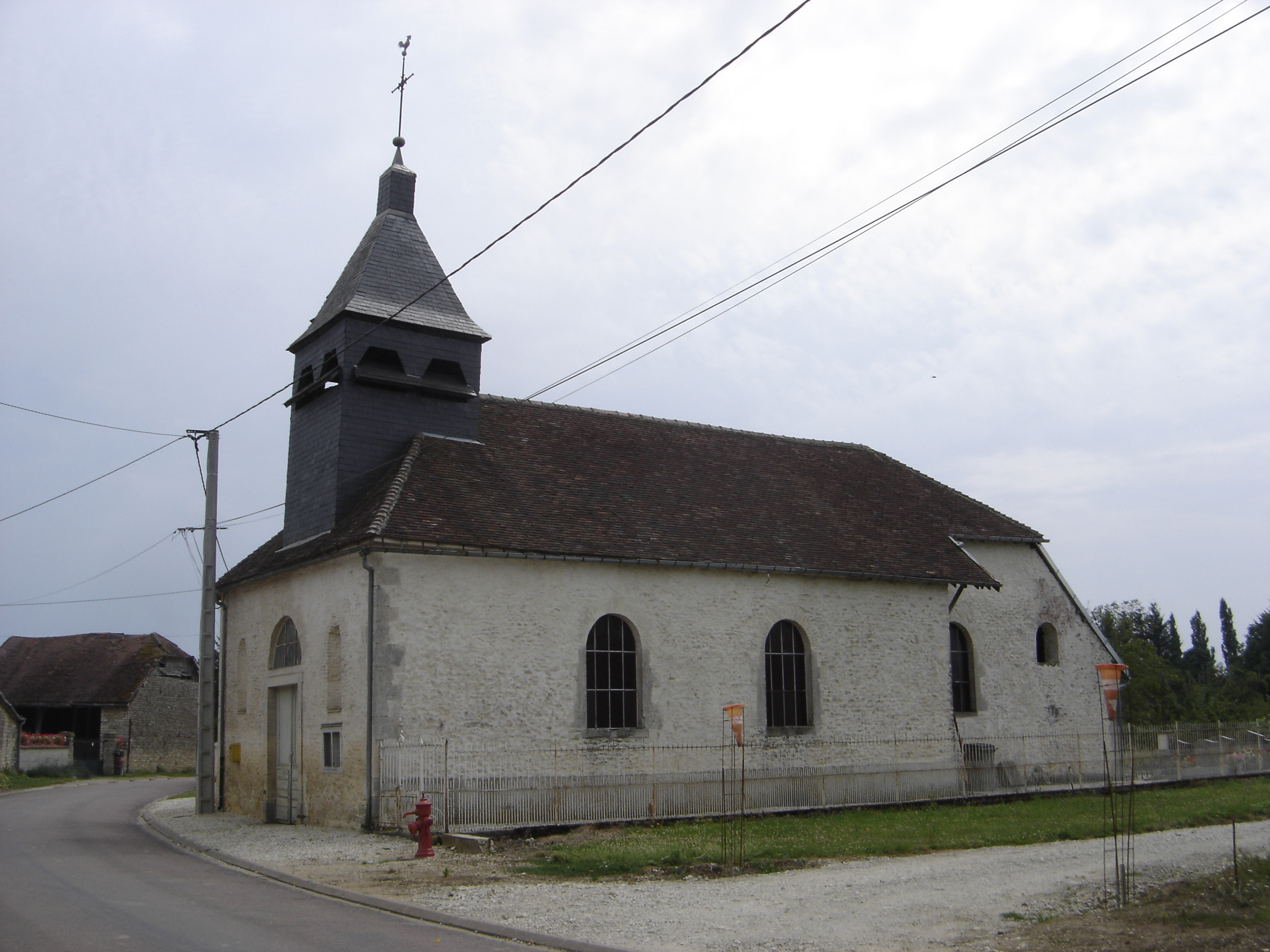
- The church in Maison-des-Champs
- Location of Maison-des-Champs
- Location within France Location within Grand Est
- Coordinates: 48°14′33″N 4°34′08″E
- Country: France
- Region: Grand Est
- Department: Aube
- Arrondissement: Bar-sur-Aube
- Canton: Vendeuvre-sur-Barse

Government
  - Mayor (2020–2026): Corinne Simon
- Area^{1}: 4.35 km^{2} (1.68 sq mi)
- Elevation: 238 m (781 ft)
- Population (2023): 36
  - Density: 8.3/km^{2} (21/sq mi)
- Time zone: UTC+01:00 (CET)
  - Summer (DST): UTC+02:00 (CEST)
- INSEE/Postal code: 10217 /10140
- ^{1} French Land Register data, which excludes lakes, ponds, glaciers > 1 km^{2} (0.386 sq mi or 247 acres) and river estuaries.

Maison-des-Champs (French pronunciation: [mɛzɔ̃ de ʃɑ̃]) is a commune in the Aube department in north-central France.

== Population ==
Historical population
Year	Pop.	±% p.a.
1968	53	—
1975	47	−1.70%
1982	43	−1.26%
1990	36	−2.20%
1999	39	+0.89%
2007	41	+0.63%
2012	38	−1.51%
2017	33	−2.78%
2023	36	+1.46%
Source: INSEE

== See also ==
- Communes of the Aube department
- Parc naturel régional de la Forêt d'Orient
