= Verrières, Aube =

Commune in Grand Est, France

Verrières
- Commune
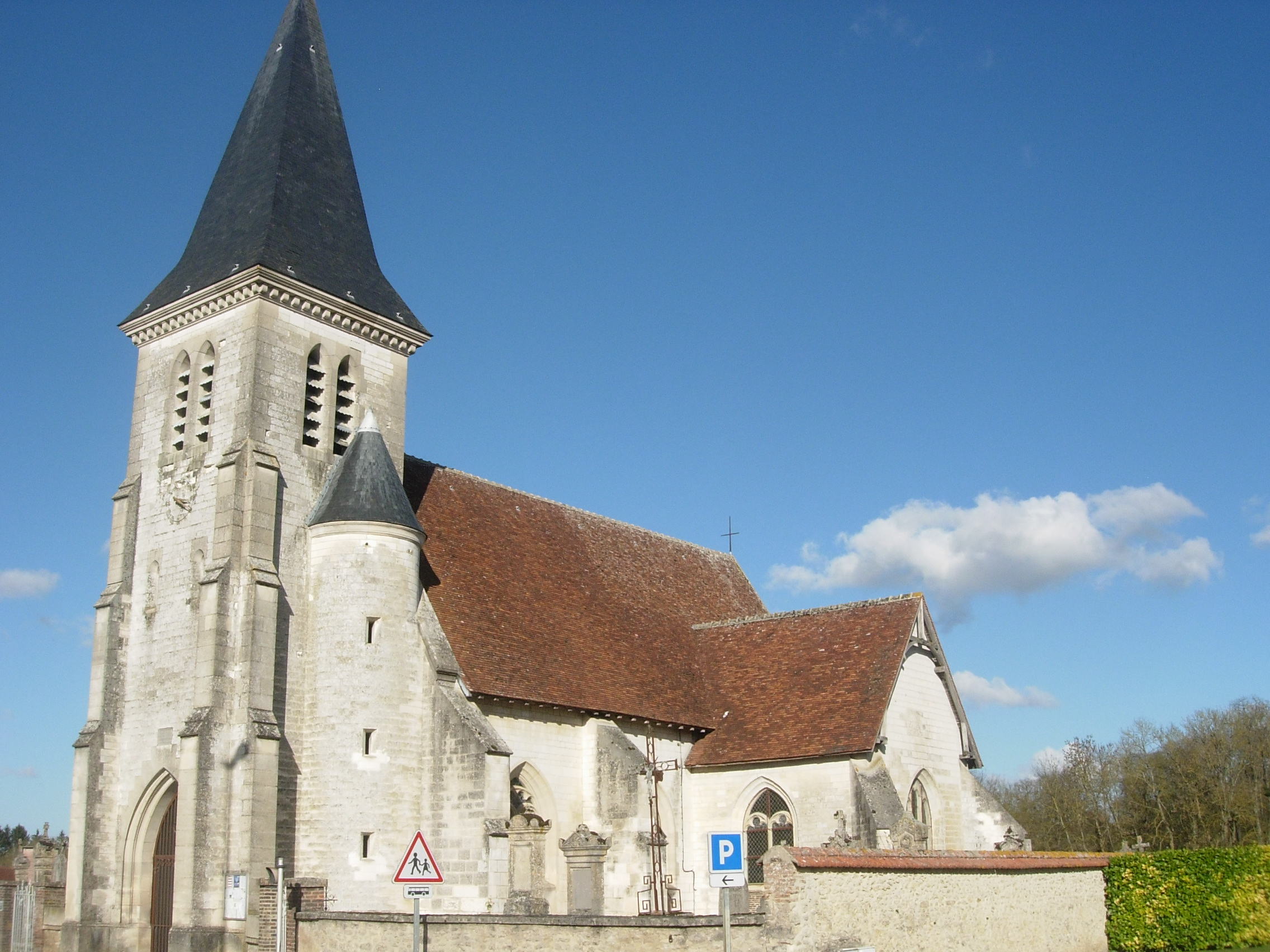
- The church in Verrières

- Coat of arms
- Location of Verrières
- Location within France Location within Grand Est
- Coordinates: 48°14′00″N 4°08′56″E
- Country: France
- Region: Grand Est
- Department: Aube
- Arrondissement: Troyes
- Canton: Vendeuvre-sur-Barse
- Intercommunality: CA Troyes Champagne Métropole

Government
  - Mayor (2020–2026): Mélanie Bagattin
- Area^{1}: 10.12 km^{2} (3.91 sq mi)
- Elevation: 124 m (407 ft)
- Population (2023): 1,923
  - Density: 190.0/km^{2} (492.1/sq mi)
- Time zone: UTC+01:00 (CET)
  - Summer (DST): UTC+02:00 (CEST)
- INSEE/Postal code: 10406 /10390
- ^{1} French Land Register data, which excludes lakes, ponds, glaciers > 1 km^{2} (0.386 sq mi or 247 acres) and river estuaries.

Verrières (French pronunciation: [vɛʁjɛʁ]) is a commune in the Aube department in north-central France.

== Population ==
Historical population
Year	Pop.	±% p.a.
1968	453	—
1975	526	+2.16%
1982	1,414	+15.17%
1990	1,728	+2.54%
1999	1,724	−0.03%
2007	1,688	−0.26%
2012	1,812	+1.43%
2017	1,870	+0.63%
2023	1,923	+0.47%
Source: INSEE

== See also ==
- Communes of the Aube department
