= Communauté d'agglomération Troyes Champagne Métropole =

Coordinates: 48.30°N 4.07°E

Troyes Champagne Métropole
- Communauté d'agglomération
- Country: France
- Region: Grand Est
- Department: Aube
- No. of communes: {{{nbcomm}}}
- Established: 2017
- Area: 889.6 km^{2} (343.5 sq mi)
- Population (2018): 172,329
  - Density: 193.7/km^{2} (501.7/sq mi)

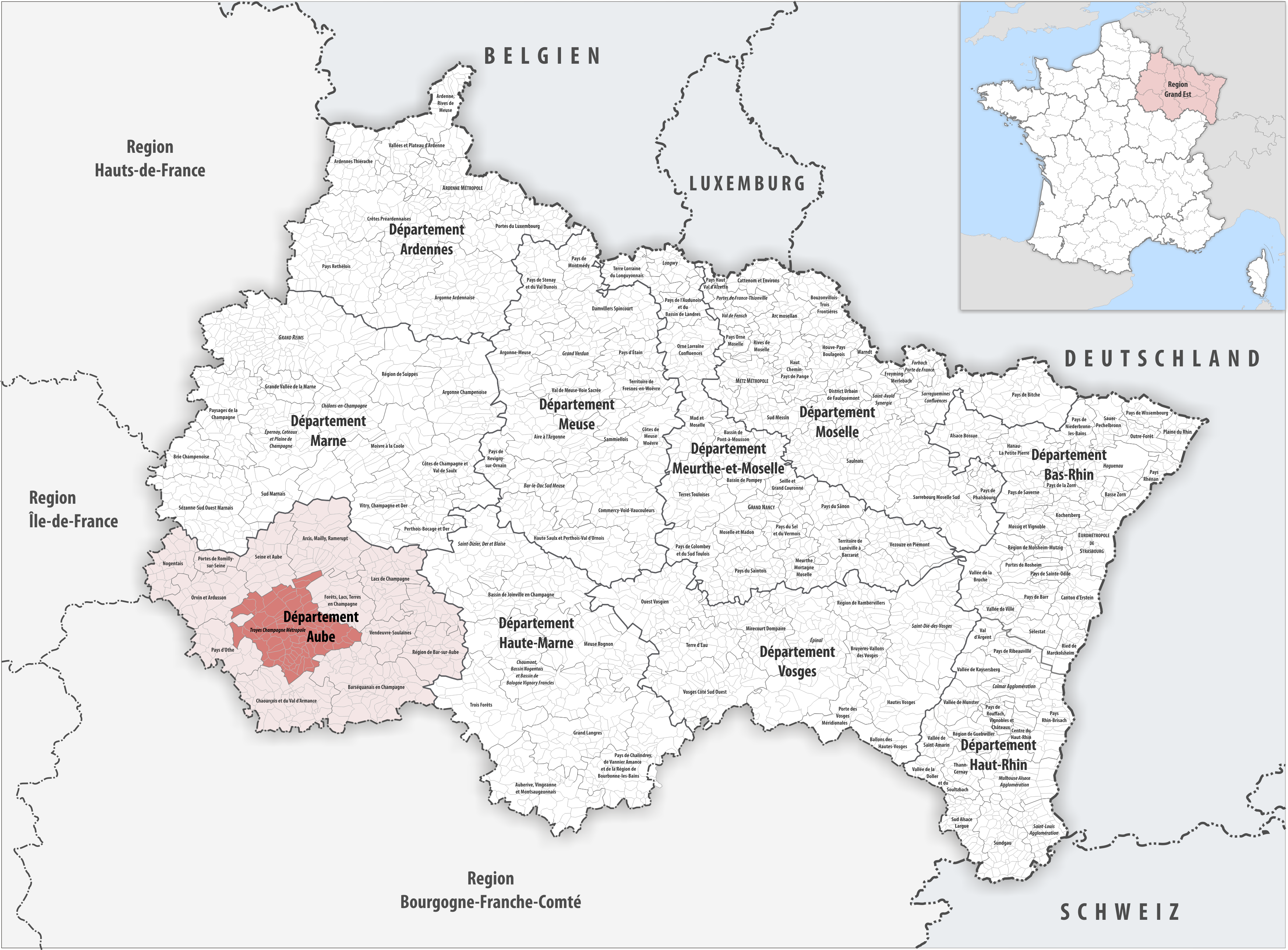
Map of Troyes Champagne Métropole

Communauté d'agglomération Troyes Champagne Métropole is the communauté d'agglomération, an intercommunal structure, centred on the city of Troyes. It is located in the Aube department, in the Grand Est region, northeastern France. It was created in January 2017 by the merger of the former Communauté d'agglomération du Grand Troyes with 3 former communautés de communes and 6 other communes. Its area is 889.6 km^{2}. Its population was 172,329 in 2018, of which 61,996 in Troyes proper.

== Composition ==
The communauté d'agglomération consists of the following 81 communes:

1. Assenay
2. Aubeterre
3. Barberey-Saint-Sulpice
4. Les Bordes-Aumont
5. Bouilly
6. Bouranton
7. Bréviandes
8. Bucey-en-Othe
9. Buchères
10. La Chapelle-Saint-Luc
11. Clérey
12. Cormost
13. Courteranges
14. Creney-près-Troyes
15. Crésantignes
16. Dierrey-Saint-Pierre
17. Estissac
18. Fays-la-Chapelle
19. Feuges
20. Fontvannes
21. Fresnoy-le-Château
22. Isle-Aumont
23. Javernant
24. Jeugny
25. Laines-aux-Bois
26. Laubressel
27. Lavau
28. Lirey
29. Longeville-sur-Mogne
30. Lusigny-sur-Barse
31. Macey
32. Machy
33. Maupas
34. Mergey
35. Mesnil-Saint-Père
36. Messon
37. Montaulin
38. Montceaux-lès-Vaudes
39. Montgueux
40. Montiéramey
41. Montreuil-sur-Barse
42. Montsuzain
43. Moussey
44. Les Noës-près-Troyes
45. Le Pavillon-Sainte-Julie
46. Payns
47. Pont-Sainte-Marie
48. Prugny
49. La Rivière-de-Corps
50. Roncenay
51. Rosières-près-Troyes
52. Rouilly-Saint-Loup
53. Ruvigny
54. Saint-André-les-Vergers
55. Saint-Benoît-sur-Seine
56. Sainte-Maure
57. Sainte-Savine
58. Saint-Germain
59. Saint-Jean-de-Bonneval
60. Saint-Julien-les-Villas
61. Saint-Léger-près-Troyes
62. Saint-Lyé
63. Saint-Parres-aux-Tertres
64. Saint-Pouange
65. Saint-Thibault
66. Sommeval
67. Souligny
68. Thennelières
69. Torvilliers
70. Troyes
71. Vailly
72. Vauchassis
73. La Vendue-Mignot
74. Verrières
75. Villacerf
76. Villechétif
77. Villeloup
78. Villemereuil
79. Villery
80. Villy-le-Bois
81. Villy-le-Maréchal
