= Canton of Vendeuvre-sur-Barse =

Coordinates: 48.24°N 4.47°E

- Canton
- Situation of the canton of Vendeuvre-sur-Barse in the department of Aube
- Country: France
- Region: Grand Est
- Department: Aube
- No. of communes: {{{nbcomm}}}
- Population (2023): 23,452
- INSEE code: 1017

The canton of Vendeuvre-sur-Barse is an administrative division of the Aube department, northeastern France. Its borders were modified at the French canton reorganisation which came into effect in March 2015. Its seat is in Vendeuvre-sur-Barse.

It consists of the following communes:

1. Amance
2. Argançon
3. Beurey
4. Bossancourt
5. Bouranton
6. Bréviandes
7. Buchères
8. Champ-sur-Barse
9. Clérey
10. Courteranges
11. Dolancourt
12. Fresnoy-le-Château
13. Isle-Aumont
14. Jessains
15. Laubressel
16. La Loge-aux-Chèvres
17. Longpré-le-Sec
18. Lusigny-sur-Barse
19. Magny-Fouchard
20. Maison-des-Champs
21. Mesnil-Saint-Père
22. Montaulin
23. Montiéramey
24. Montmartin-le-Haut
25. Montreuil-sur-Barse
26. Moussey
27. Puits-et-Nuisement
28. Rouilly-Saint-Loup
29. Ruvigny
30. Saint-Léger-près-Troyes
31. Saint-Thibault
32. Thennelières
33. Trannes
34. Vauchonvilliers
35. Vendeuvre-sur-Barse
36. Verrières
37. La Villeneuve-au-Chêne
