= Trannes =

Commune in Grand Est, France

- Commune
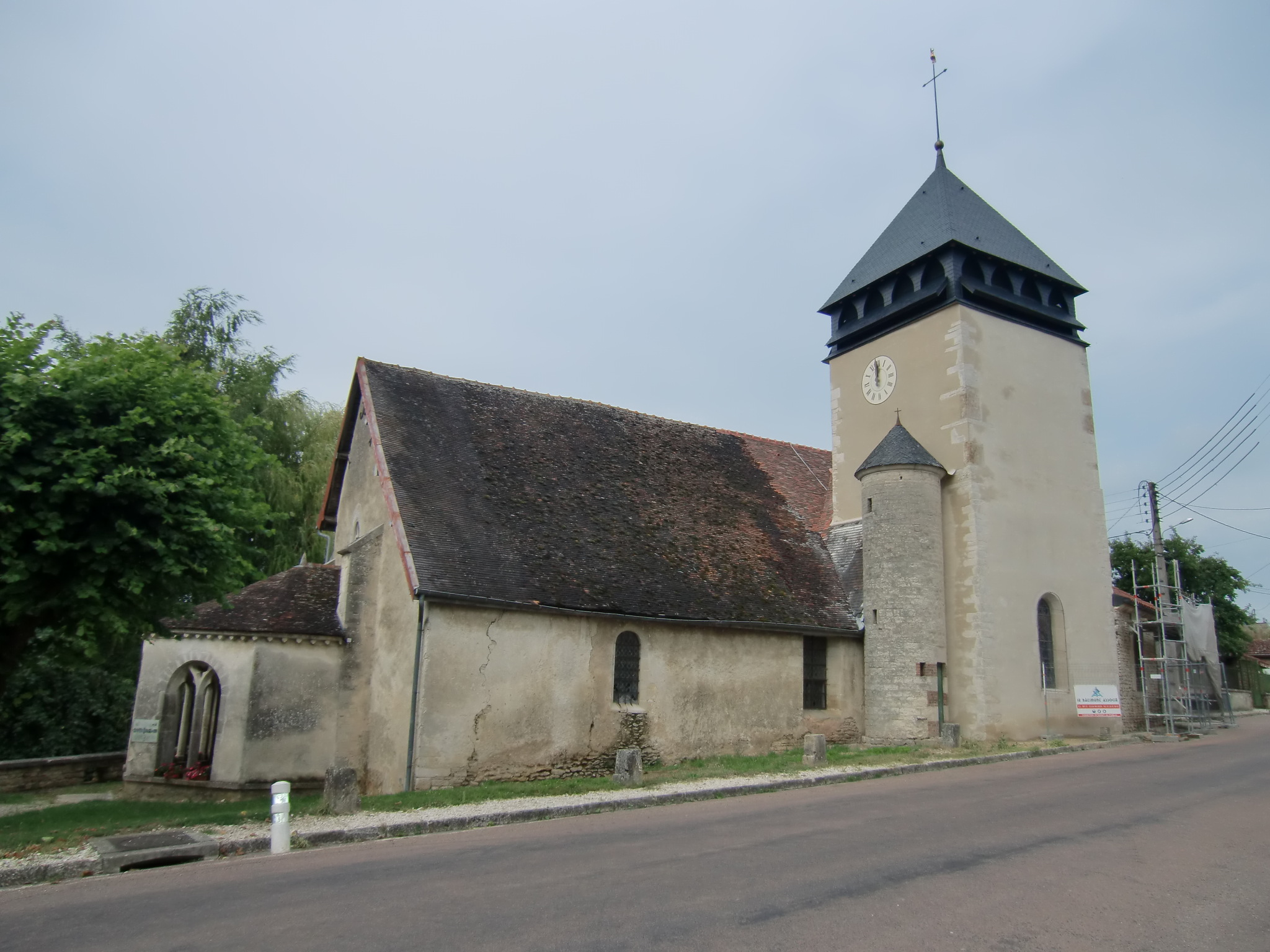
- The church in Trannes
- Location of Trannes
- Location within France Location within Grand Est
- Coordinates: 48°18′09″N 4°35′12″E
- Country: France
- Region: Grand Est
- Department: Aube
- Arrondissement: Bar-sur-Aube
- Canton: Vendeuvre-sur-Barse

Government
  - Mayor (2020–2026): David Michaut
- Area^{1}: 10.11 km^{2} (3.90 sq mi)
- Elevation: 153 m (502 ft)
- Population (2023): 194
  - Density: 19.2/km^{2} (49.7/sq mi)
- Time zone: UTC+01:00 (CET)
  - Summer (DST): UTC+02:00 (CEST)
- INSEE/Postal code: 10384 /10140
- ^{1} French Land Register data, which excludes lakes, ponds, glaciers > 1 km^{2} (0.386 sq mi or 247 acres) and river estuaries.

Trannes (French pronunciation: [tʁan]) is a commune in the Aube department in north-central France.

== Population ==
Historical population
Year	Pop.	±% p.a.
1968	203	—
1975	160	−3.34%
1982	149	−1.01%
1990	153	+0.33%
1999	190	+2.44%
2007	270	+4.49%
2012	249	−1.61%
2017	243	−0.49%
2023	194	−3.68%
Source: INSEE

== See also ==
- Communes of the Aube department
- Parc naturel régional de la Forêt d'Orient
