= Clérey =

Commune in Grand Est, France

- Commune
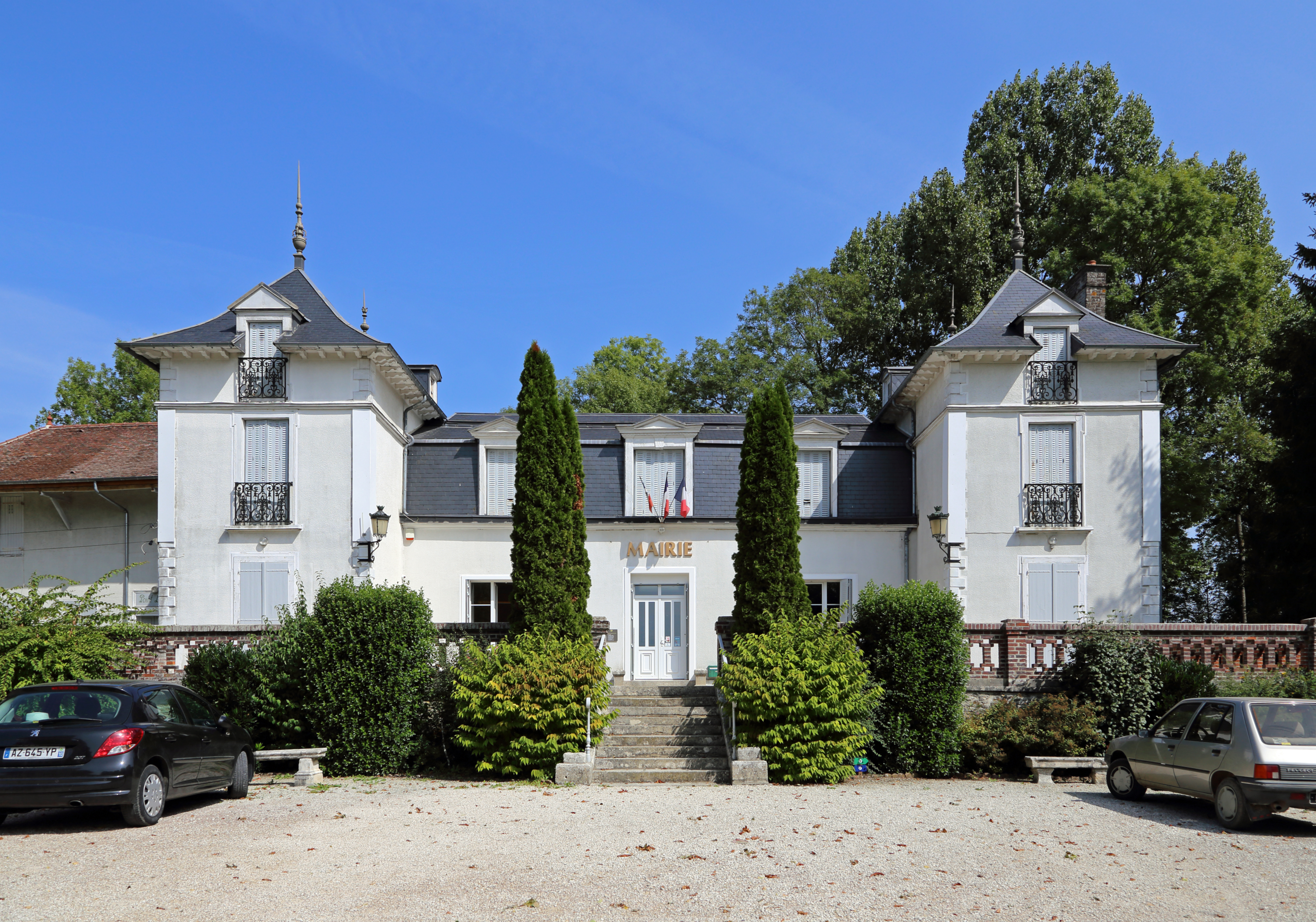
- The town hall in Clérey

- Coat of arms
- Location of Clérey
- Location within France Location within Grand Est
- Coordinates: 48°12′33″N 4°11′28″E
- Country: France
- Region: Grand Est
- Department: Aube
- Arrondissement: Troyes
- Canton: Vendeuvre-sur-Barse
- Intercommunality: CA Troyes Champagne Métropole

Government
  - Mayor (2020–2026): Jean-Pierre Lécorché
- Area^{1}: 18.79 km^{2} (7.25 sq mi)
- Elevation: 146 m (479 ft)
- Population (2023): 1,155
  - Density: 61.47/km^{2} (159.2/sq mi)
- Time zone: UTC+01:00 (CET)
  - Summer (DST): UTC+02:00 (CEST)
- INSEE/Postal code: 10100 /10390
- ^{1} French Land Register data, which excludes lakes, ponds, glaciers > 1 km^{2} (0.386 sq mi or 247 acres) and river estuaries.

Clérey (French pronunciation: [kleʁɛ]) is a commune in the Aube department in north-central France.

== Population ==
Historical population
| Year | Pop. | ±% p.a. |
|---|---|---|
| 1968 | 802 | — |
| 1975 | 788 | −0.25% |
| 1982 | 825 | +0.66% |
| 1990 | 865 | +0.59% |
| 1999 | 930 | +0.81% |
| 2007 | 1,104 | +2.17% |
| 2012 | 1,108 | +0.07% |
| 2017 | 1,100 | −0.14% |
| 2023 | 1,155 | +0.82% |
Source: INSEE

== See also ==
- Communes of the Aube department
