= La Loge-aux-Chèvres =

Commune in Grand Est, France

- Commune
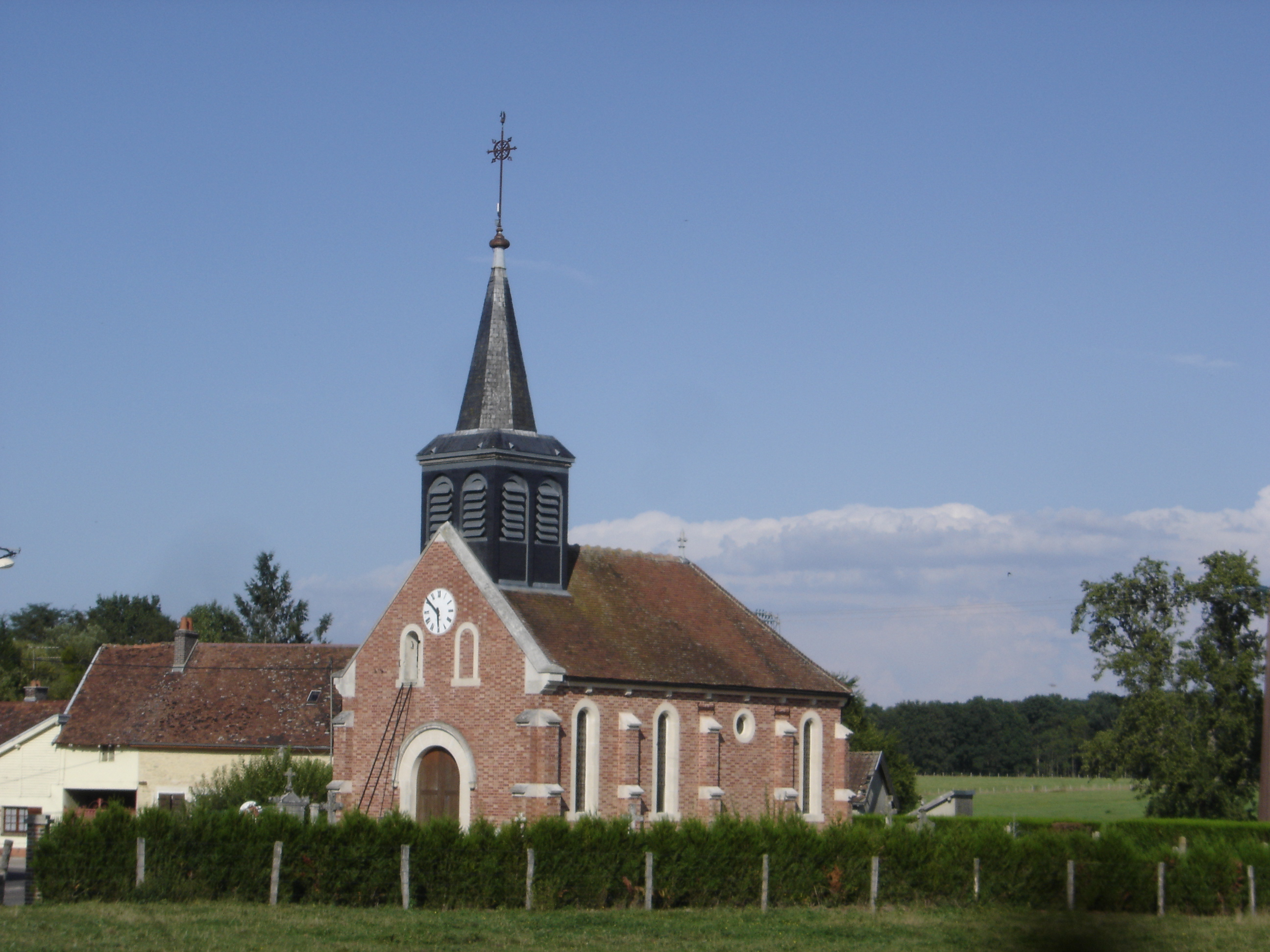
- The church in La Loge-aux-Chèvres
- Location of La Loge-aux-Chèvres
- Location within France Location within Grand Est
- Coordinates: 48°16′26″N 4°24′51″E
- Country: France
- Region: Grand Est
- Department: Aube
- Arrondissement: Bar-sur-Aube
- Canton: Vendeuvre-sur-Barse

Government
  - Mayor (2020–2026): Jean-Michel Chapellier-Monny
- Area^{1}: 2.82 km^{2} (1.09 sq mi)
- Elevation: 180 m (590 ft)
- Population (2023): 94
  - Density: 33/km^{2} (86/sq mi)
- Time zone: UTC+01:00 (CET)
  - Summer (DST): UTC+02:00 (CEST)
- INSEE/Postal code: 10200 /10140
- ^{1} French Land Register data, which excludes lakes, ponds, glaciers > 1 km^{2} (0.386 sq mi or 247 acres) and river estuaries.

La Loge-aux-Chèvres (French pronunciation: [la lɔʒ o ʃɛvʁ]) is a commune in the Aube department in north-central France.

== Population ==
Historical population
Year	Pop.	±% p.a.
1968	69	—
1975	66	−0.63%
1982	69	+0.64%
1990	67	−0.37%
1999	79	+1.85%
2007	78	−0.16%
2012	84	+1.49%
2017	84	+0.00%
2023	94	+1.89%
Source: INSEE

== See also ==
- Communes of the Aube department
- Parc naturel régional de la Forêt d'Orient
