= Bossancourt =

Commune in Grand Est, France

- Commune
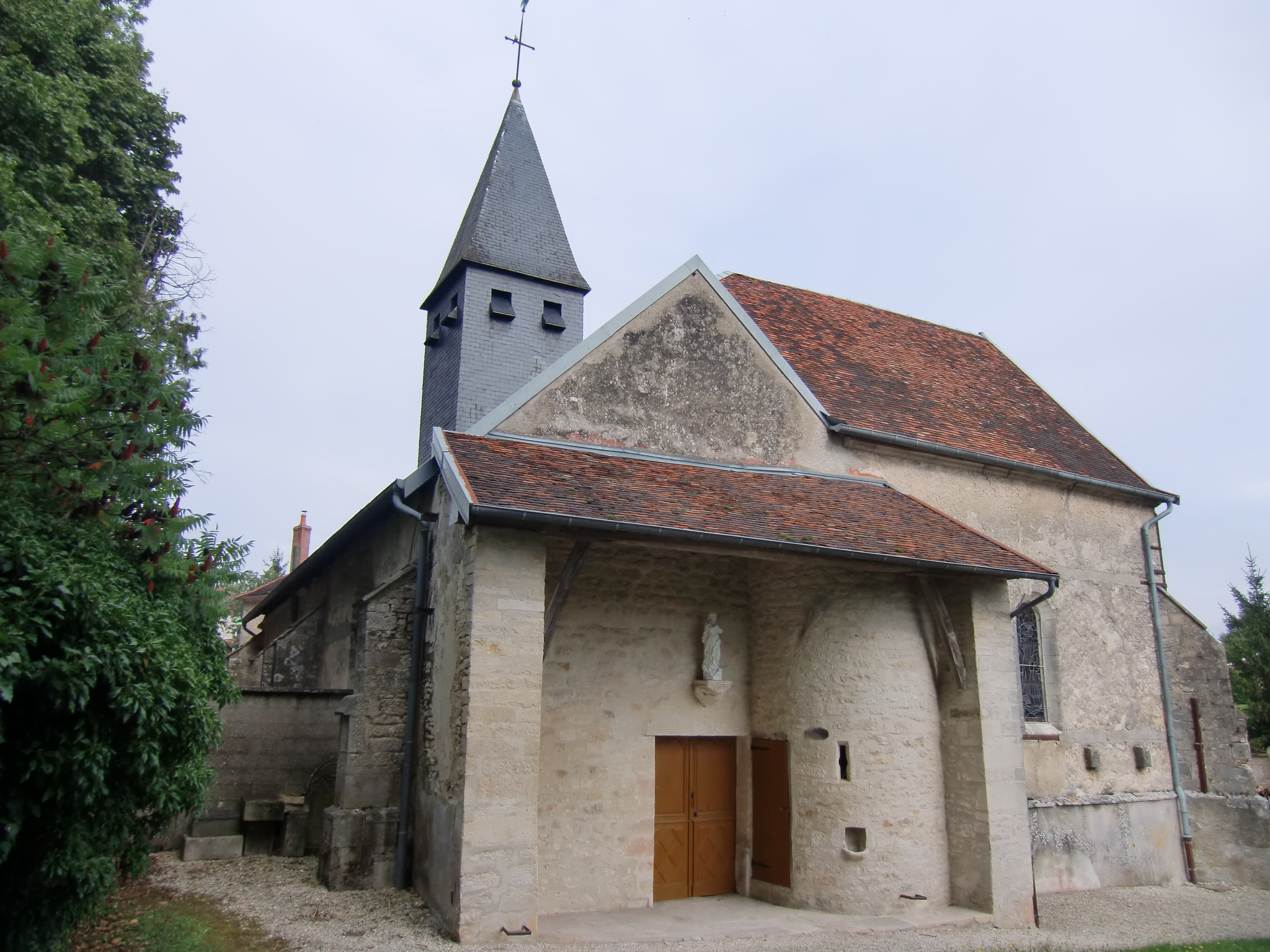
- The church in Bossancourt
- Location of Bossancourt
- Location within France Location within Grand Est
- Coordinates: 48°16′58″N 4°36′10″E
- Country: France
- Region: Grand Est
- Department: Aube
- Arrondissement: Bar-sur-Aube
- Canton: Vendeuvre-sur-Barse

Government
  - Mayor (2020–2026): Annick Bertrand
- Area^{1}: 6.92 km^{2} (2.67 sq mi)
- Elevation: 149 m (489 ft)
- Population (2023): 193
  - Density: 27.9/km^{2} (72.2/sq mi)
- Time zone: UTC+01:00 (CET)
  - Summer (DST): UTC+02:00 (CEST)
- INSEE/Postal code: 10050 /10140
- ^{1} French Land Register data, which excludes lakes, ponds, glaciers > 1 km^{2} (0.386 sq mi or 247 acres) and river estuaries.

Bossancourt (French pronunciation: [bɔsɑ̃kuʁ]) is a commune in the Aube department in north-central France.

== Population ==
Historical population
Year	Pop.	±% p.a.
1968	159	—
1975	154	−0.46%
1982	143	−1.05%
1990	236	+6.46%
1999	236	+0.00%
2007	210	−1.45%
2012	185	−2.50%
2017	206	+2.17%
2023	193	−1.08%
Source: INSEE

== See also ==
- Communes of the Aube department
- Parc naturel régional de la Forêt d'Orient
