= Isle-Aumont =

Commune in Grand Est, France

- Commune
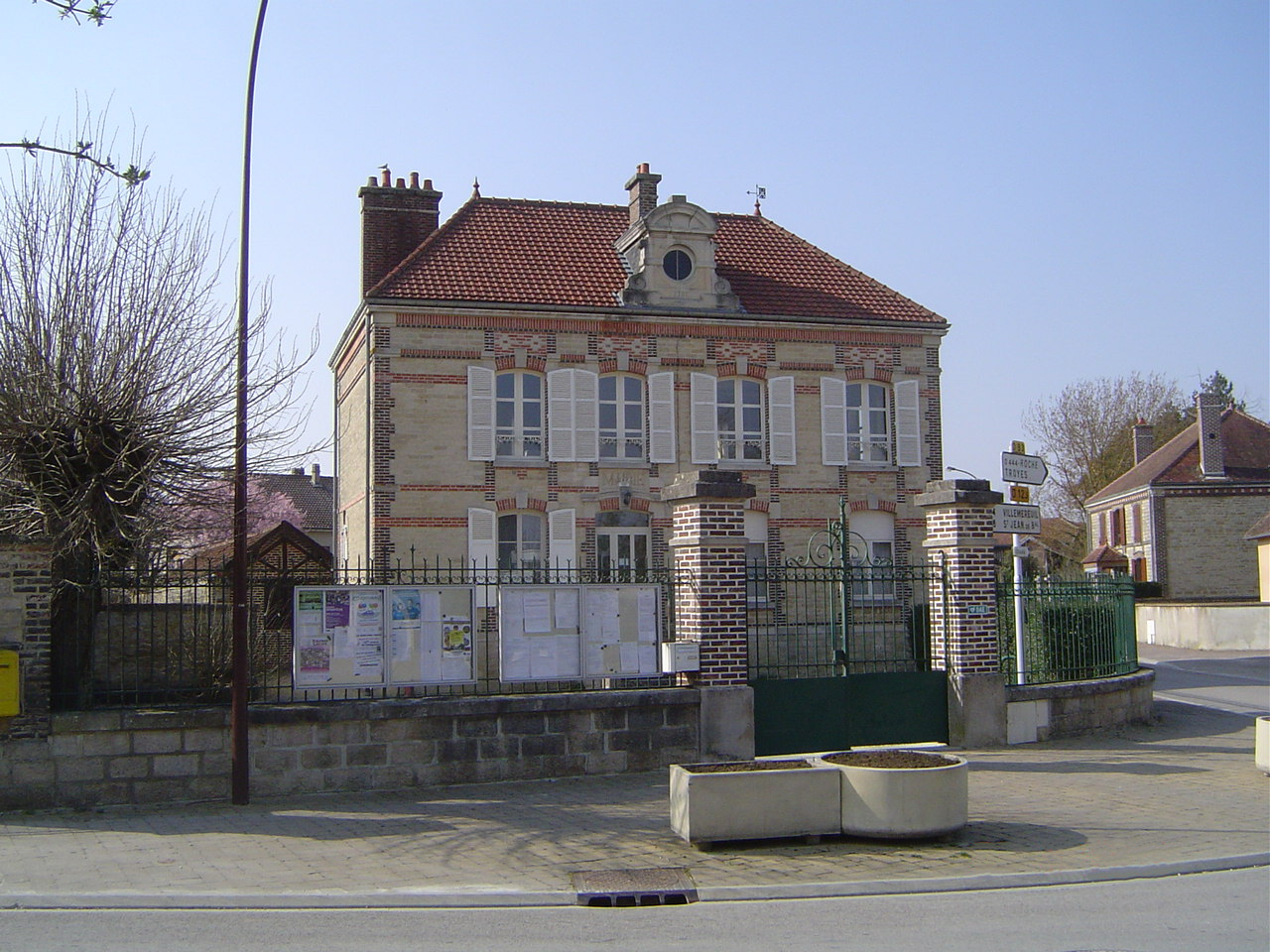
- City hall of Isle-Aumont

- Coat of arms
- Location of Isle-Aumont
- Location within France Location within Grand Est
- Coordinates: 48°12′47″N 4°07′31″E
- Country: France
- Region: Grand Est
- Department: Aube
- Arrondissement: Troyes
- Canton: Vendeuvre-sur-Barse
- Intercommunality: CA Troyes Champagne Métropole

Government
  - Mayor (2020–2026): Jean-François Reslinski
- Area^{1}: 3.48 km^{2} (1.34 sq mi)
- Elevation: 123 m (404 ft)
- Highest elevation: 136 m (446 ft)
- Lowest elevation: 112 m (367 ft)
- Population (2023): 505
  - Density: 145/km^{2} (376/sq mi)
- Time zone: UTC+01:00 (CET)
  - Summer (DST): UTC+02:00 (CEST)
- INSEE/Postal code: 10173 /10800
- ^{1} French Land Register data, which excludes lakes, ponds, glaciers > 1 km^{2} (0.386 sq mi or 247 acres) and river estuaries.

Isle-Aumont (French pronunciation: [il omɔ̃]) is a commune in the Aube department in the Grand Est region, France. In the middle ages it was part of the Lordship of Isle, which was later raised to the status of a marquisate and then a duchy vested in the House of Aumont.

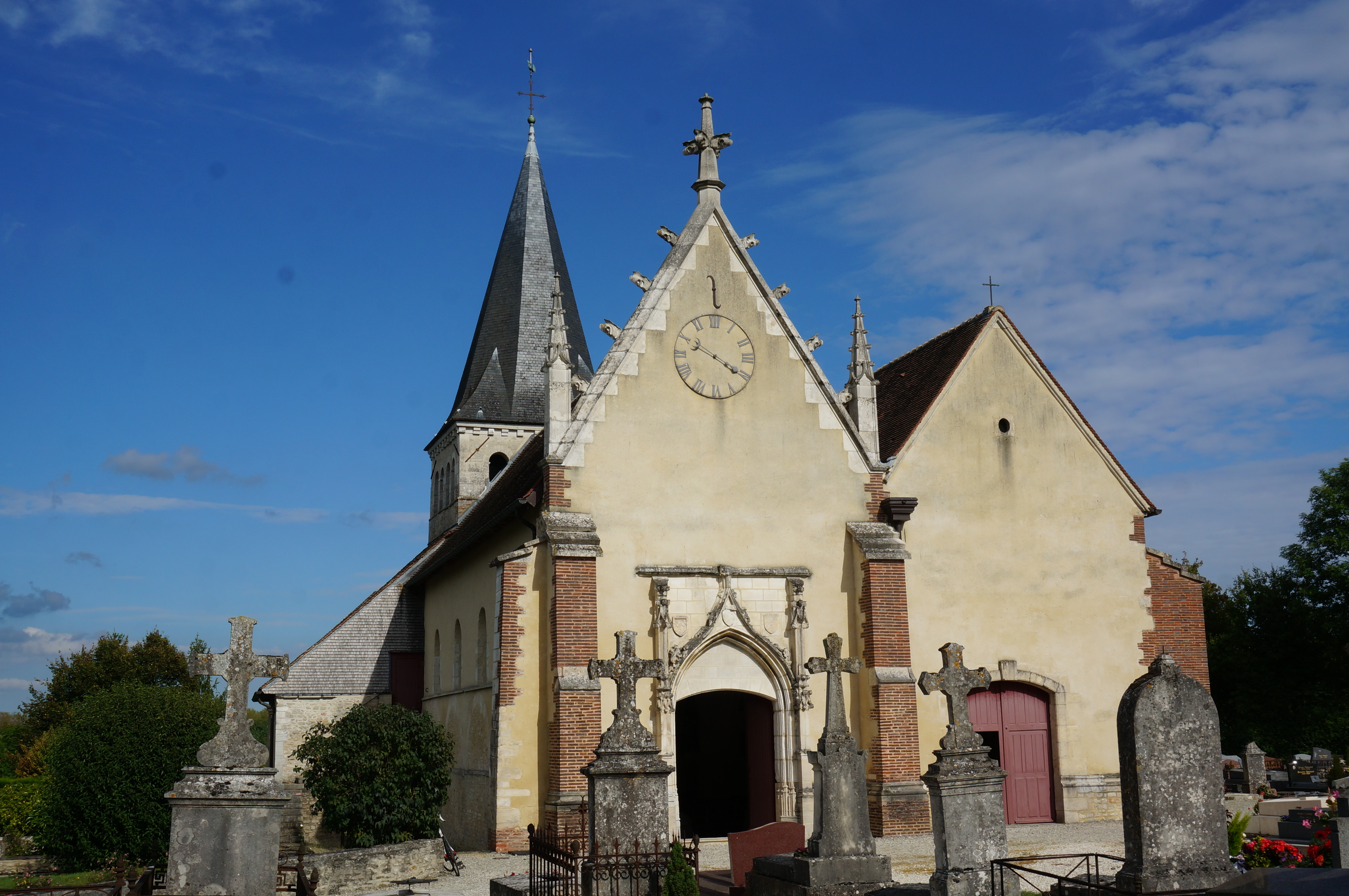
Church

== Population ==
Historical population
Year	Pop.	±% p.a.
1968	165	—
1975	351	+11.39%
1982	367	+0.64%
1990	558	+5.38%
1999	543	−0.30%
2007	516	−0.64%
2012	508	−0.31%
2017	472	−1.46%
2023	505	+1.13%
Source: INSEE

== History ==
In the middle ages the town formed part of the seigneury or lordship of Isle. By the time of Henry II the lordship of Isle was vested in the House of Aumont when it became a marquisate. In 1665, Louis XIV raised it to a duchy, creating the then marquis, Antoine d"Aumont, 1st Duke of Aumont.

== See also ==
- Communes of the Aube department
