= Saint-Thibault, Aube =

Commune in Grand Est, France

Saint-Thibault
- Commune
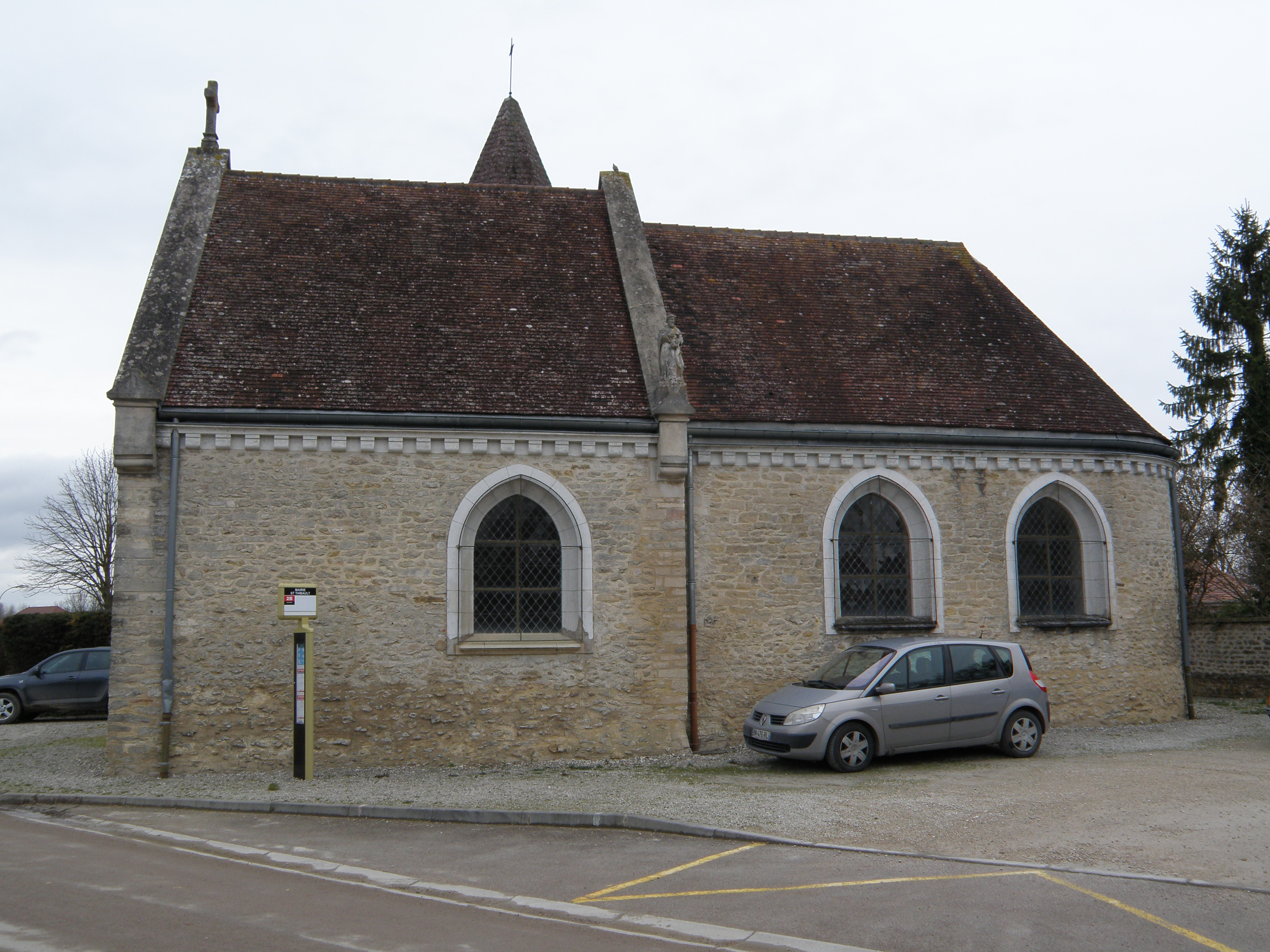
- The church in Saint-Thibault
- Location of Saint-Thibault
- Location within France Location within Grand Est
- Coordinates: 48°12′23″N 4°08′33″E
- Country: France
- Region: Grand Est
- Department: Aube
- Arrondissement: Troyes
- Canton: Vendeuvre-sur-Barse
- Intercommunality: CA Troyes Champagne Métropole

Government
  - Mayor (2020–2026): Marie-France Jolliot
- Area^{1}: 11.71 km^{2} (4.52 sq mi)
- Elevation: 119 m (390 ft)
- Population (2023): 551
  - Density: 47.1/km^{2} (122/sq mi)
- Time zone: UTC+01:00 (CET)
  - Summer (DST): UTC+02:00 (CEST)
- INSEE/Postal code: 10363 /10800
- ^{1} French Land Register data, which excludes lakes, ponds, glaciers > 1 km^{2} (0.386 sq mi or 247 acres) and river estuaries.

Saint-Thibault (French pronunciation: [sɛ̃ tibo]) is a commune in the Aube department in north-central France.

== Population ==
Historical population
Year	Pop.	±% p.a.
1968	372	—
1975	373	+0.04%
1982	494	+4.10%
1990	479	−0.38%
1999	462	−0.40%
2007	485	+0.61%
2012	484	−0.04%
2017	555	+2.78%
2023	551	−0.12%
Source: INSEE

== See also ==
- Communes of the Aube department
