= Magny-Fouchard =

Commune in Grand Est, France

- Commune
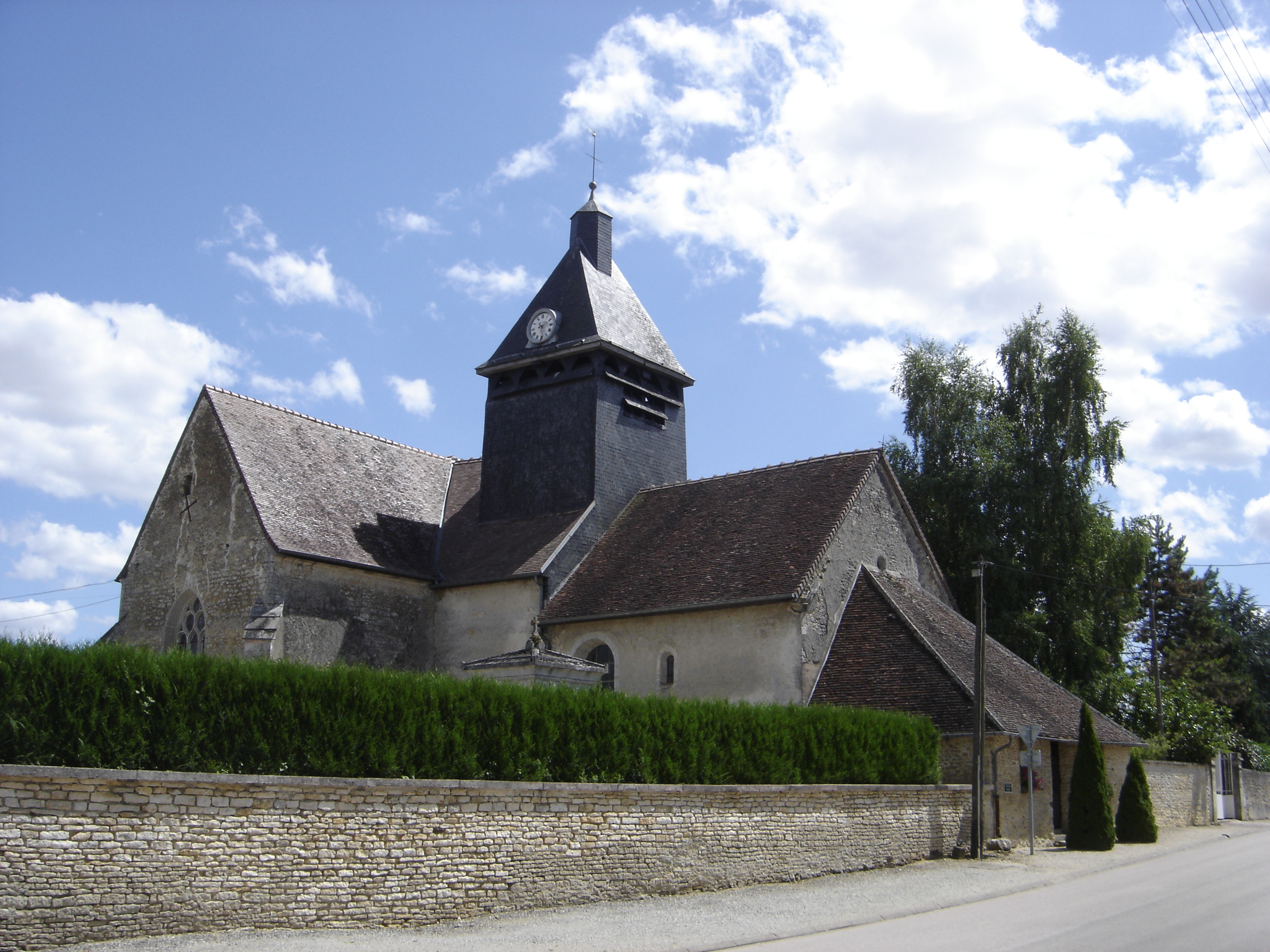
- The church in Magny-Fouchard
- Location of Magny-Fouchard
- Location within France Location within Grand Est
- Coordinates: 48°14′37″N 4°32′15″E
- Country: France
- Region: Grand Est
- Department: Aube
- Arrondissement: Bar-sur-Aube
- Canton: Vendeuvre-sur-Barse

Government
  - Mayor (2020–2026): Valérie Rivet
- Area^{1}: 15.16 km^{2} (5.85 sq mi)
- Elevation: 208 m (682 ft)
- Population (2023): 260
  - Density: 17/km^{2} (44/sq mi)
- Time zone: UTC+01:00 (CET)
  - Summer (DST): UTC+02:00 (CEST)
- INSEE/Postal code: 10215 /10140
- ^{1} French Land Register data, which excludes lakes, ponds, glaciers > 1 km^{2} (0.386 sq mi or 247 acres) and river estuaries.

Magny-Fouchard (French pronunciation: [maɲi fuʃaʁ]) is a commune in the Aube department in north-central France.

== Population ==
Historical population
Year	Pop.	±% p.a.
1968	210	—
1975	188	−1.57%
1982	215	+1.94%
1990	225	+0.57%
1999	199	−1.36%
2007	240	+2.37%
2012	299	+4.49%
2017	267	−2.24%
2023	260	−0.44%
Source: INSEE

== See also ==
- Communes of the Aube department
- Parc naturel régional de la Forêt d'Orient
