= Vauchonvilliers =

Commune in Grand Est, France

- Commune
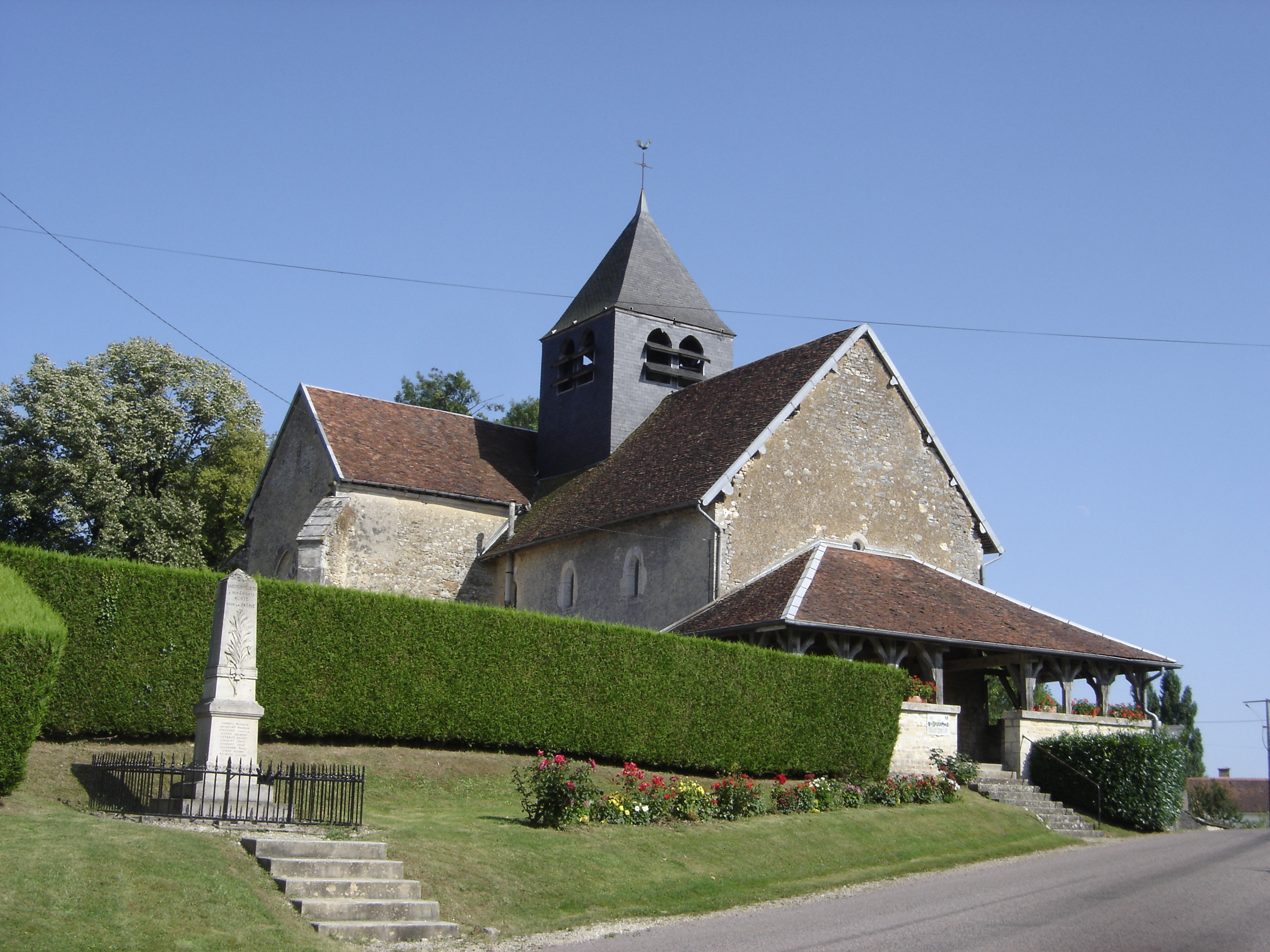
- The church in Vauchonvilliers
- Location of Vauchonvilliers
- Location within France Location within Grand Est
- Coordinates: 48°15′59″N 4°31′37″E
- Country: France
- Region: Grand Est
- Department: Aube
- Arrondissement: Bar-sur-Aube
- Canton: Vendeuvre-sur-Barse

Government
  - Mayor (2025–2026): Jean-Bernard Jorry
- Area^{1}: 11.62 km^{2} (4.49 sq mi)
- Elevation: 229 m (751 ft)
- Population (2023): 174
  - Density: 15.0/km^{2} (38.8/sq mi)
- Time zone: UTC+01:00 (CET)
  - Summer (DST): UTC+02:00 (CEST)
- INSEE/Postal code: 10397 /10140
- ^{1} French Land Register data, which excludes lakes, ponds, glaciers > 1 km^{2} (0.386 sq mi or 247 acres) and river estuaries.

Vauchonvilliers (French pronunciation: [voʃɔ̃vilje]) is a commune in the Aube department in north-central France.

== Population ==
Historical population

Year	Pop.	±% p.a.
1793	308	—
1821	305	−0.03%
1846	388	+0.97%
1872	335	−0.56%
1901	266	−0.79%
1926	210	−0.94%
1946	197	−0.32%
1962	206	+0.28%
1968	176	−2.59%

Year	Pop.	±% p.a.
1975	166	−0.83%
1982	151	−1.34%
1990	134	−1.48%
1999	123	−0.95%
2007	129	+0.60%
2012	149	+2.92%
2017	158	+1.18%
2023	174	+1.62%

Source: EHESS and INSEE (1968-2023)

== See also ==
- Communes of the Aube department
- Parc naturel régional de la Forêt d'Orient
