= Lake of Orient =

Lake in the Grand Est region of France

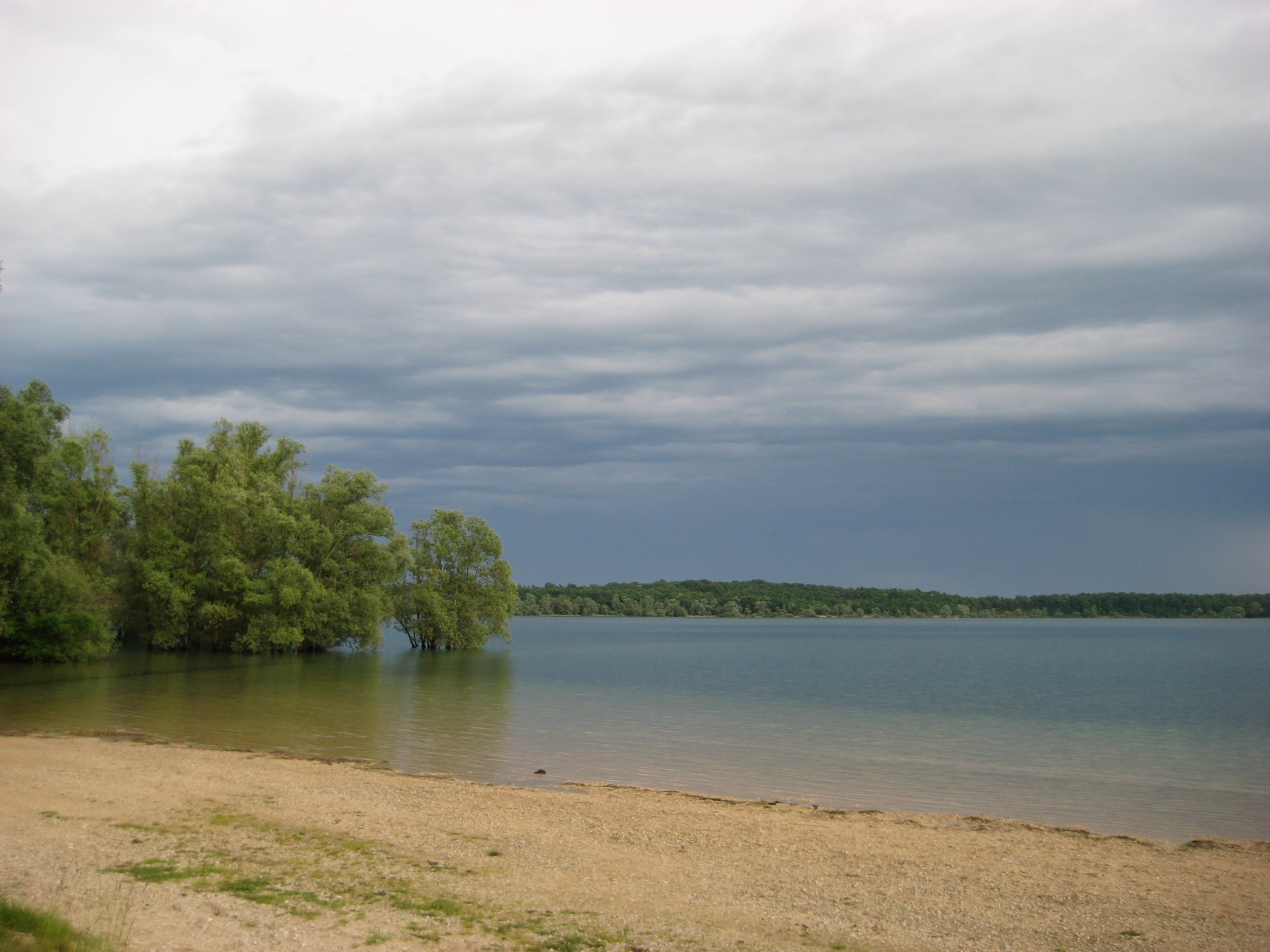
- Lake of the Orient Forest

- Location within France
- Location: France
- Coordinates: 48°16′21″N 04°19′48″E
- Type: Artificial
- Primary inflows: Inlet channel
- Surface area: 23 km^{2} (8.9 sq mi)
- Max. depth: 22 m (72 ft)
- Water volume: 205 km^{2} (79 sq mi)

The Lake of Orient or Seine Reservoir Lake is a lake in northeastern France, located in the Aube department of the Grand Est region. With a surface area of 23 km^{2} (8.9 sq mi) and a normal capacity of 205 km^{3} (49 cu mi), it is the third-largest Artificial Lake in mainland France, after Lake Der-Chantecoq and Lake Serre-Ponçon, and ahead of Lake Sainte-Croix. (Note: Lac du Der has a surface area of 48 km2, Lac de Serre-Ponçon 28 km2 and Lac de Sainte-Croix 22 km2.)

It is one of the four great Seine lakes, designed to protect Paris from flooding. Built as a diversion from the Seine in the 1950s and 1960s, it was first put into service in 1966. Along with the neighboring Amance and Temple lakes, it is part of the Orient Forest Regional Natural Park, from which it takes its name.

== Geography ==
Map of Lake Orient.

The Lake of Orient is located in the Champagne wetlands, 12 km east of Troyes in the Aube department (Champagne-Ardenne), in the heart of the Oriental forest. This forest, which gave the lake its name, was named after the Knights Templar, who owned part of the site in the Middle Ages. Like the other four major Seine lakes - Lake Pannecière, Lake Der-Chantecoq, Lake Amance and Temple Lake - the lake is managed by the "Inter-departmental Institution for Reservoir Dams of the Seine Basin'' (IIBRBS).

The lake is surrounded by three villages in the urban area of Troyes (172,497 inhabitants in 1999): Géraudot, Lusigny-sur-Barse and Mesnil-Saint-Père, respectively with 290, 1,668 and 385 inhabitants in 2007. It also lies within the territory of Dosches, Montiéramey and Piney. These municipalities belong to the cantons of Lusigny-sur-Barse and Piney.

Its maximum depth is 22 m, but this varies according to the lake's water level, which is constantly changing throughout the year, as the seasons go by. The lake's impermeability is ensured by a layer of albian clay, naturally abundant in the region (albian takes its name from the river Aube). Although it doesn't include a single island, the lake has eight peninsulas (the main one being Little Italy) and a dozen inlets of varying sizes, all located in the northern part of the lake.

== Hydrology ==
With a surface area of 2,300 hectares, the lake has a reservoir capacity of 205 million m3. It is surrounded by five earth dams (at Géraudot, Chavaudon, Beaumont, la Morge and Mesnil-Saint-Père) totalling 5.7 km in length and up to 25 m in height.

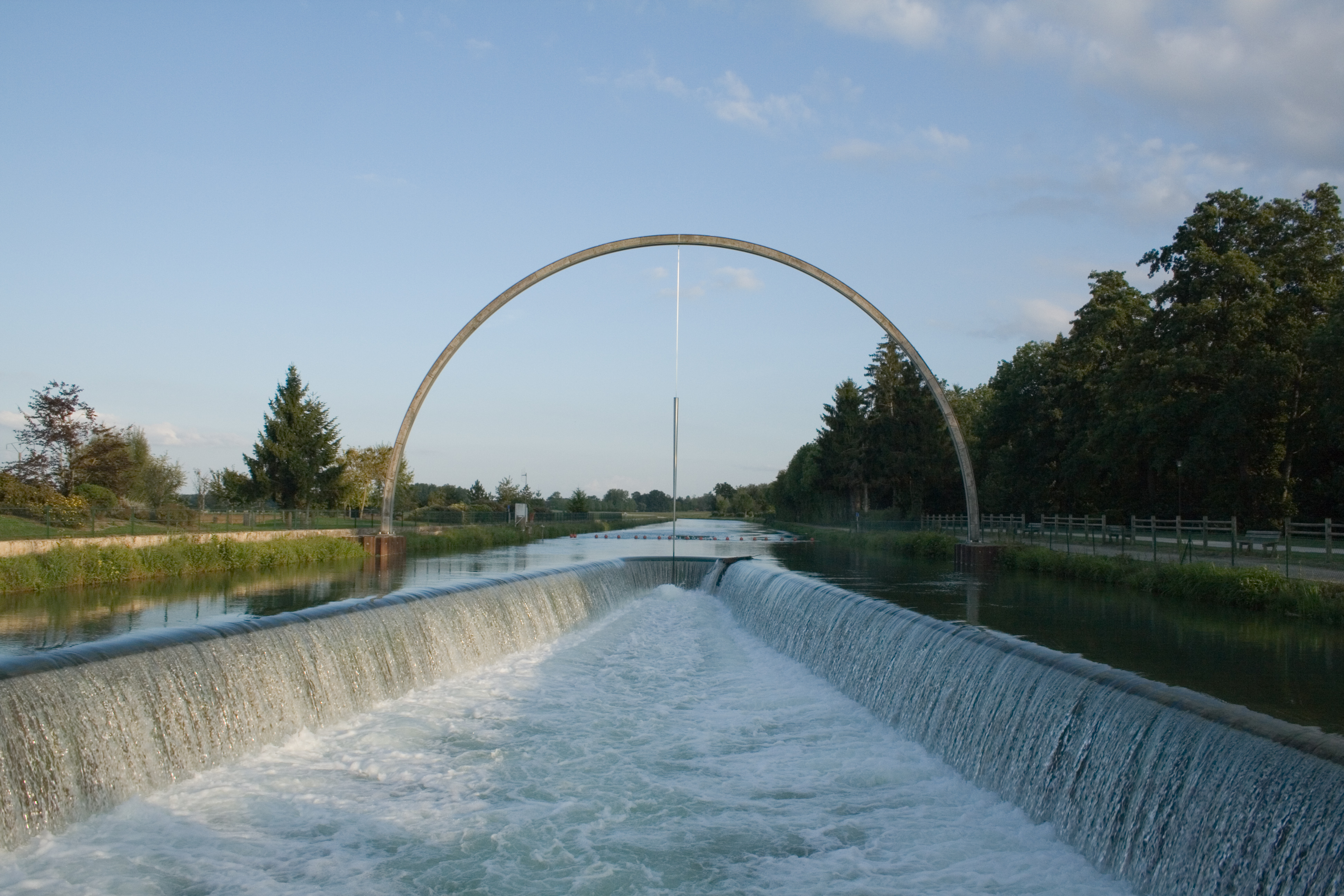
The Morge canal, at Lusigny.

From November 1 to June 30, water is removed from the Seine downstream of Bar-sur-Seine via a 13 km-long intake canal, when the river is at its highest level. During floods, an additional quantity of water is diverted to attenuate the impact: this is known as "flood control". From July 1 to October 31, or even later in the event of drought, water is returned to the Seine when it is at its lowest level. This action is called "low-water support". The water is returned upstream of Troyes via the Morge canal, before splitting in two at Ruvigny, becoming the Baires canal to the north and the Saint-Julien canal to the south. The length of these canals is 24.6 km. On November 1, only 18.6 million m³ remained in the lake, representing the "dead section" (water level essential for fish survival) and the "reserve section", in the event of prolonged low-water periods in November and December.

Every ten years, an extraordinary discharge is carried out to check the structural integrity of the lake. On this occasion, it is possible to see the structures that became submerged when the lake was flooded (old pond dikes, brickworks ruins, etc.), as well as the debris that some people left behind. The last complete discharge took place in 2008.

== Weather ==
Local weather combines continental and oceanic climates. With fewer days of sunshine and rain than the rest of France, just as many days of thunderstorms and snow, and a little more fog, humid Champagne Auboise has a fairly mild climate, although its record cold in 1971 was −25.2 °C and its record heat, which dates from the heatwave of 2019, is 41.8 °C.

Troyes-Barberey temperature recordings.
Month	Jan	Feb	March	April	May	June	July	Aug	Sept	Oct	Nov	Dec	Per year
Maximum temperature record (°C)	16,2	22,1	26,1	29,2	33,3	37,9	41,8	40,6	35,0	30,3	23,0	19,0	41,8
Average maximum temperature (°C)	5,8	7,5	11,6	14,5	19,0	22,1	25,2	25,2	21,1	16,0	9,7	6,9	15,4
Average minimum temperature (°C)	−0,3	−0,2	2,0	3,3	7,3	10,4	12,4	12,0	9,4	6,5	2,5	1,0	5,6
Record minimum temperature (°C)	−25,2	−25,0	−15,4	−6,2	−3,5	0,4	1,6	1,1	−1,9	−7,0	−11,1	−21,0	−25,2
Average monthly rainfall (mm)	51	47	51	51	61	58	48	49	55	64	52	64	653

== History ==
In 1910, a major Seine flood inundated Paris. The Seine department then planned to build an upstream reservoir capable of storing excess water from the Seine in winter and returning it to the river in summer. The watertight soils of the Champagne and Morvan regions were ideal for the creation of such a lake, and the idea of building a water reserve in the middle of the Oriental Forest emerged. However, in the 1930s, the local political class fiercely opposed this "Parisian project", which would destroy a significant part of the Aube forest, which at the time had great economic potential.

In 1949, the purpose-built Pannecière reservoir was inaugurated on the Yonne in Morvan.

Following further flooding of the Seine in summer 1951, the project was revived in 1952. Without any consultation with the residents of Aubois, work began on November 18, 1959. Six years later, on March 29, 1966, the lake, then known as Lusigny Lake, was inaugurated in the presence of the Minister of Public Works, Edgard Pisani. The entire Oriental Lake complex, comprising the lake, canals, dams and bridges, now covered the territory of 19 municipalities.

In 1967, the General Council of the Aube department, which had acquired the tourist and sports rights over the lake three years earlier, decided to rename it "Oriental Forest Lake", instead of "Seine Reservoir Lake", a more touristic name that was also intended to replace the overly simplistic name of Lusigny Lake. Today, however, even the Regional Natural Park uses the name "The Lake of Orient".

On May 7, 2013, the filling level of the Lake of Orient became exceptionally high. The Public Territorial Basin Establishment decided to continue filling the Orient, Temple and Amance lakes up to a limit of 50 cm. As a result, at 8 a.m, the volume of water potentially absorbable by the flooding of Oriental Lake had reached 218.16 million m3 out of the 219.50 million m³ of absorbable water capacity. Water intake was stopped at 11 p.m. As a result of the flooding, several municipalities were affected, including Buchères, Verrières and Bréviandes.

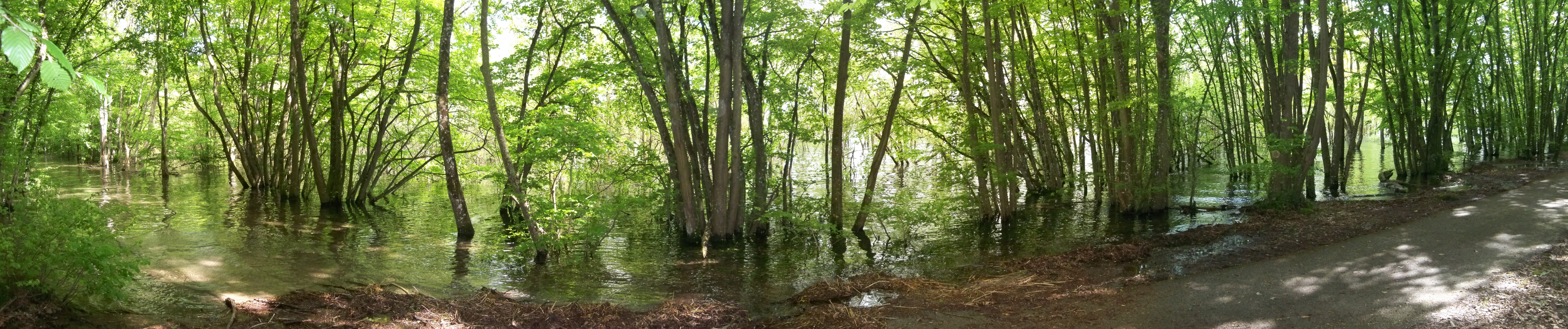
The flood as seen from the Petit-Orient forest, on the Velovoie des Lacs path.

== Flora and fauna ==
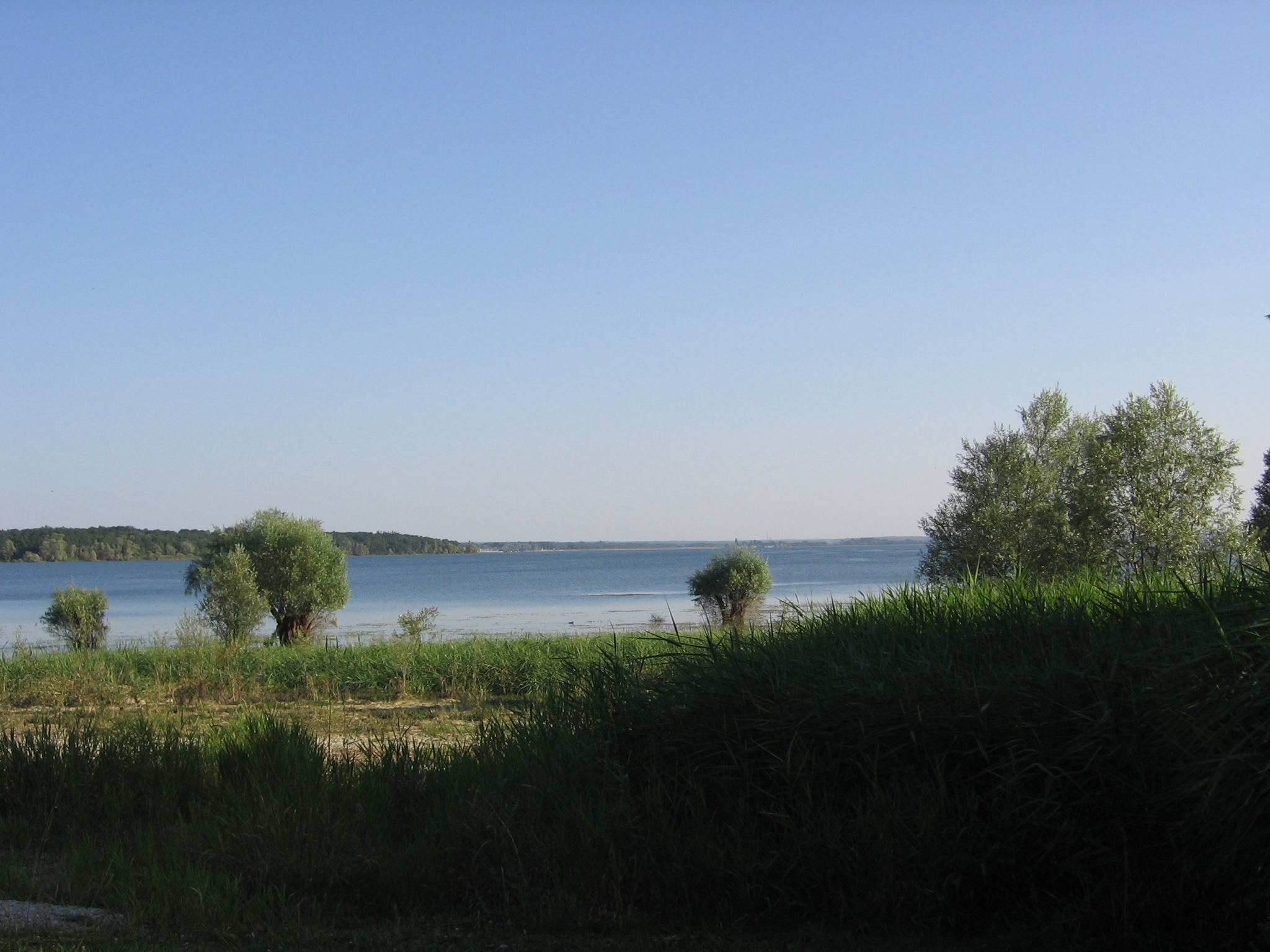
View of vegetation and lake.

The Lake of Orient has been classified as a Special Area of Conservation by the Natura 2000 network since September 1986, along with Lake Amance and Temple Lake, as part of a group known as the "Lakes of the Orient Forest", covering 21 municipalities and an area of 23,575 ha. According to Natura 2000, this site is recognized as "a vast territory made up of several types of habitats (large forests, lakes, numerous ponds, meadows, farmland) in a very good state of conservation". It is also, along with Lake Der-Chantecoq, a complex of great ornithological interest (migration or nesting). It is also part of the Regional Natural Park of the Oriental Forest, one of the first five in France, created in 1970. It is also part of the National Nature Reserve of the Oriental Forest.

The Natura 2000 network lists 107 bird species on the site, including the grey crane and several species of egret, godwit, woodcock, sandpiper, snipe, harrier, duck, sandpiper, stork, swan, falcon, scaup, gull, gannet, tern, merganser, heron, kite, gull, goose, woodpecker, loon, plover and teal. For the majority of these birds, many of which are protected, the lakes are a migratory route, a wintering ground or a breeding ground. The Orient Forest Natural Reserve is home to 212 bird species (including 5 bycatch). More than 900 insect species can be found near the lake: 531 coleopterans, 295 lepidopterans, 45 odonates, 19 orthopterans, 14 trichopterans, two ephemeropterans and one dermapteran. 41 mammal species (including 11 species of bats and the forest cat), 11 amphibian species (including the yellow-bellied sounder) and 5 reptile species (such as the viviparous lizard) have been recorded. The lake is home to 17 species of fish, including roach, tench, perch, trout, zander and carp. Night carp fishing attracts many tourists every year.

A "wildlife area" has been created on the 89-hectare Luxembourg-Piney peninsula. This area has three observatories where you can discover, in semi-liberty, the mammals living in the Oriental Forest: deer, roe, wild boar, as well as a few Heck's goldbuck, elk and konik polski tarpan.

In terms of flora, the reserve boasts over 400 plant species in the surrounding forests, 176 of which are due to the lakes. A number of remarkable species can be found here, such as purple loosestrife, grass-leaved alisma, water limosella and scorodoine germander. There are also 531 species of fungi, 41 of bryophytes and 11 of pteridophytes.

== Tourism ==
=== Infrastructure ===
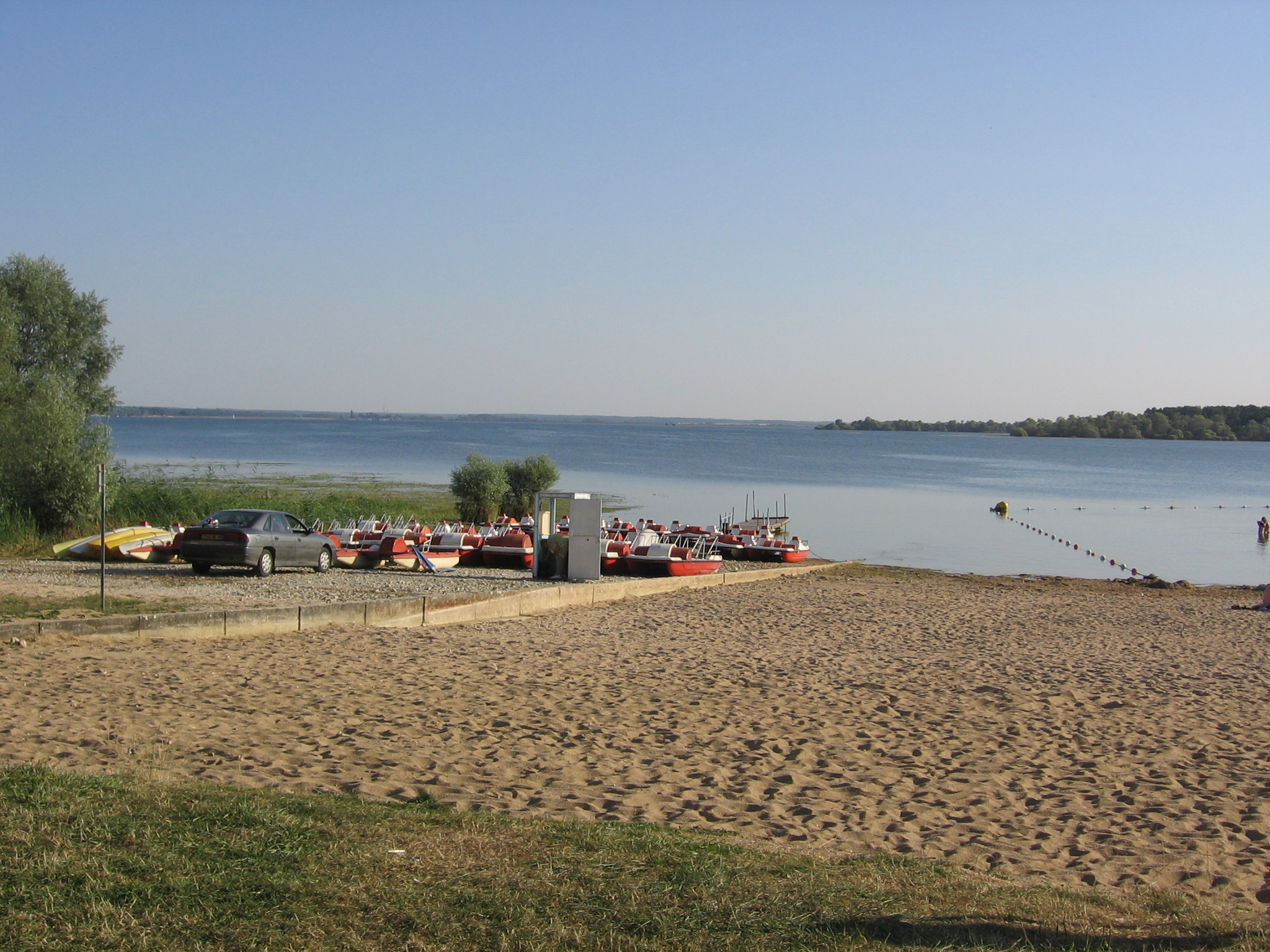
Pedal boats on the beach at Géraudot.

The lake is accessible via the A5 highway from the cities of Troyes (Paris) and Chaumont (Lyon), and via the former National Route 19, now Departmental Route 619. The nearest airport is Troyes-Barberey.

It is entirely dedicated to swimming and sailing, as motorized craft are not allowed on the lake. There is a marina at Mesnil-Saint-Père, close to one of the lake's three beaches, the others being Lusigny and Géraudot. Other sites are also available for boat departures, including the "Departmental Sailing School" on the Picarde peninsula and other sailing schools. In spring and summer, you can enjoy a wide range of water sports, including scuba diving, canoeing, kayaking, pedal boating, windsurfing and keelboating.

Since 2003, the cycling path known as the Lake Cycling Way (Vélovoie des lacs) has linked Saint-Julien-les-Villas to the outskirts of Troyes and Dienville, running along the Saint Julien Canal, the Morge Canal, the shores of the Lake of Orient and Temple Lake for a total of 42 km. This project continues with the 13 km Seine greenway, opened in 2015, which crosses the Troyes conurbation and links up with another 27 km greenway along the Haute-Seine Canal, completed in 2009, to form a continuous 80 km stretch that will be extended to the west towards Nogent-sur-Seine and to the northeast towards the Lake Der and Saint-Dizier cycle paths.

A number of campsites, hostels, B&Bs and hotels are located close to the lake.

=== The surrounding area ===
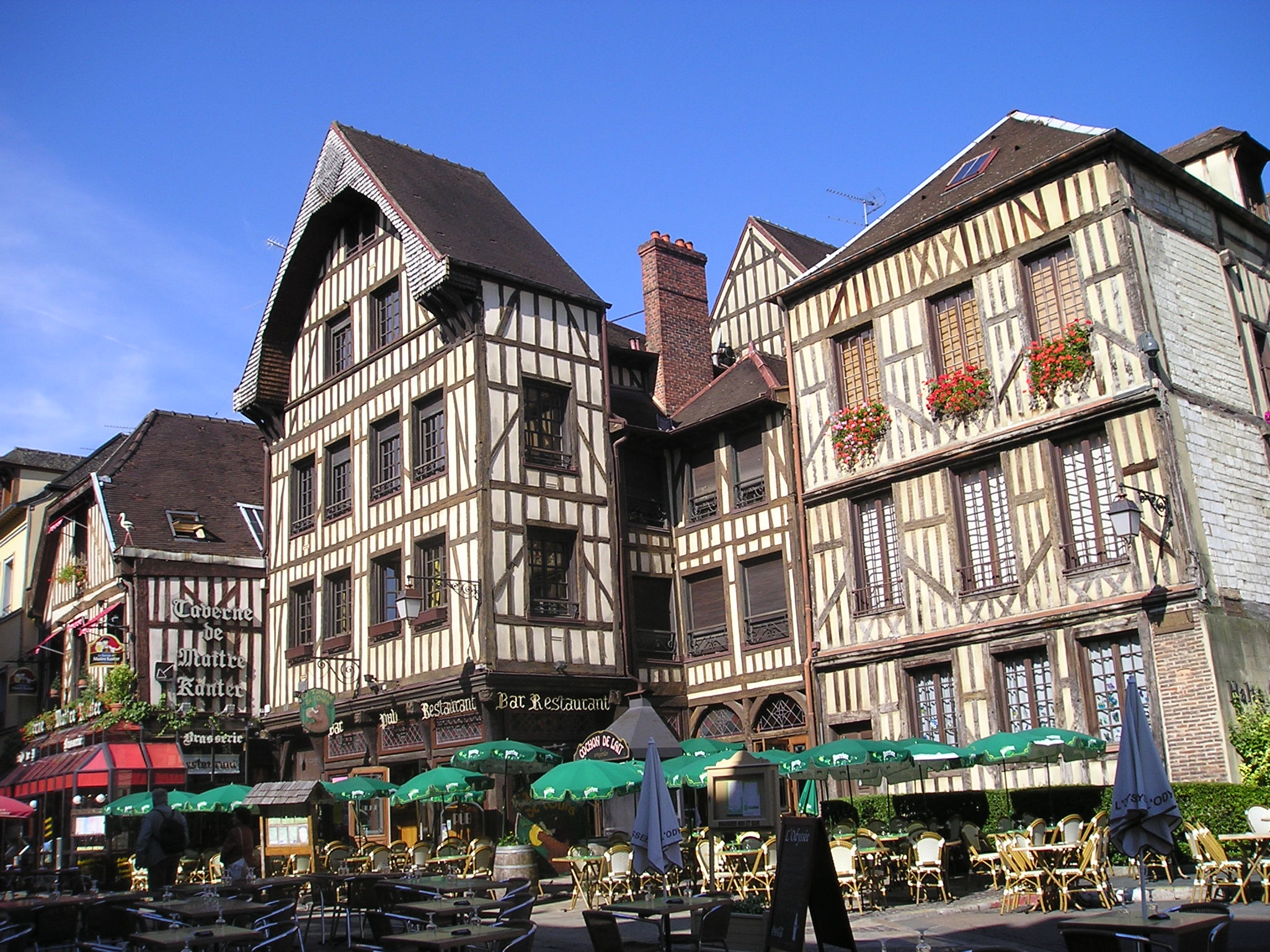
Typical houses in downtown Troyes.

The lake is part of the Oriental Forest Natural Park, which is also home to the Amance and Temple lakes, reserved for motorboating and fishing. Beyond the park, the city of Troyes, administrative center of the department, is known for its rich medieval heritage and its factory outlets, in some ways the legacy of the Champagne trade fairs that made it prosperous in the 11th and 13th centuries.

To the east of the lake lies the Nigloland theme park, which attracted over 655,000 visitors during the 2018 season, ranking 5th among France's theme parks in terms of attendance.

To the south, the Champagne vineyards of the Côte des Bar region are just a few dozen kilometers from the lake. Here you'll find the village of Essoyes, once home to the painter Pierre-Auguste Renoir. His family home, studio and garden, as well as a dedicated cultural space, are open to the public. The artist is now buried in the local cemetery, where he shares his grave with two of his children, the actor Pierre Renoir and the great filmmaker Jean Renoir.

A little further afield is the Charles-de-Gaulle memorial at Colombey-les-Deux-Églises.

On the ornithological front, just over 50 km away, (Note: Distance between Géraudot and Giffaumont-Champaubert on Mappy) Lake Der-Chantecoq is renowned for the tens of thousands of cranes (Grus grus) that pass through here every autumn. Attracting almost a million visitors a year, it is another of the great Seine lakes built to protect Paris from flooding.

== See also ==
- Orient Forest Regional Natural Park
- EPTB Seine Grands Lacs
