= Lakes Amance and du Temple =

Reservoirs in Aube department, France

- Lacs Amance et du Temple (French)
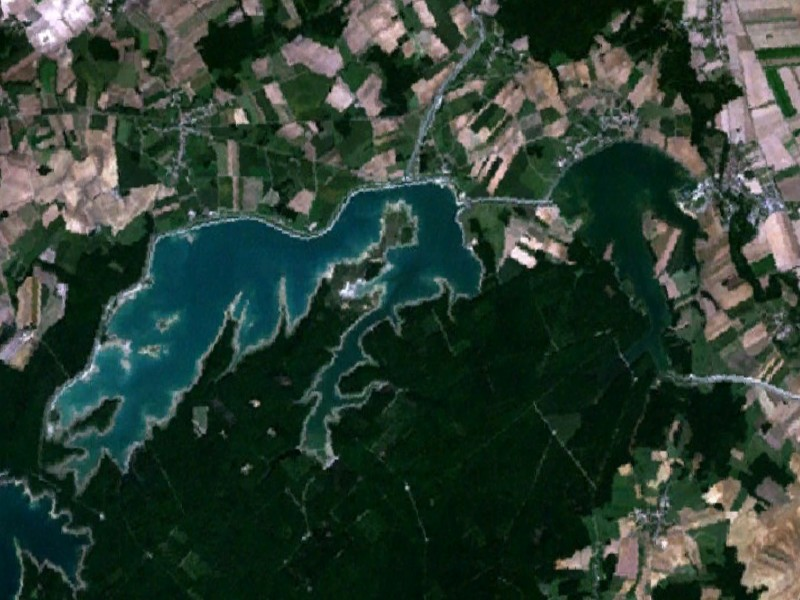
- Satellite view of Lac Amance and Lac du Temple.

- Location of the Lakes in Grand Est region.
- Location: Grand Est region.
- Coordinates: 48°20′42″N 4°28′42″E
- Type: Lake
- Primary inflows: Inflow channel (Aube)
- Primary outflows: 1 650 km2
- Basin countries: France
- Surface area: 8.95757 sq mi (23.2000 km^{2})
- Water volume: 137,821.44826 cu mi (5.744648558×10^{14} m^{3}; 4.657262380×10^{11} acre⋅ft)

Lakes Amance and du Temple are the two human-made lakes that together form the Aube reservoir. They are located in the Aube department, in the Grand Est region of France. The former is Europe's largest lake reserved for motorboating, and the latter is Europe's largest non-nautical lake. While their normal capacity is 170 hm3, with a total surface area of 23.2 km2 they could, if combined as a single lake, be the third largest man-made lake in France, matching the size of Lac d'Orient. Completed and commissioned in 1989, they are among the last of the great Seine lakes to have been built. Like the neighboring Lac d'Orient, they are part of the Orient Forest Regional Natural Park, created in 1970, twenty years before the project was completed.

The two lakes, linked by a channel, were designed to protect Paris and its conurbation from the devastating floods of the Seine, into which the Aube flows. They were also given secondary functions: while Lake Amance, to the east, was dedicated to motorboating, Lac du Temple, to the west, was given over to nature discovery.

== Geography ==
=== Location ===
The Aube reservoir is located in the cantons of Brienne-le-Château, Piney, and Vendeuvre-sur-Barse, in the Aube department, Champagne-Ardenne. It was built on the Champagne humide plain, whose subsoil makes the lake watertight, between the towns of Troyes, Bar-sur-Aube, and Brienne-le-Château. It is bordered to the north by fields, and to the south by the Forêt du Temple and the Forêt d'Orient.

=== Lake Amance ===
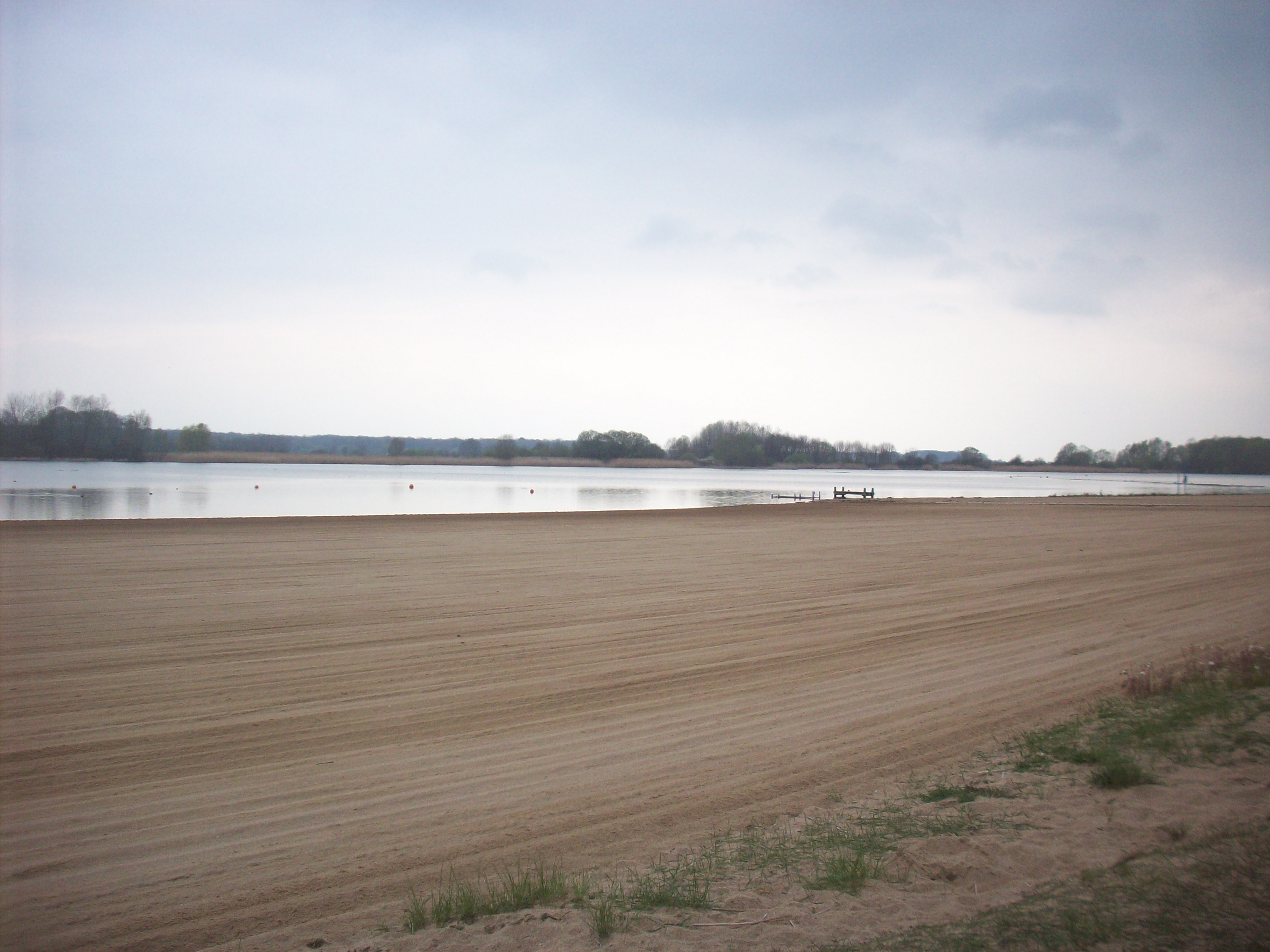
Lake Amance beach.

With a surface area of 480 ha, Lake Amance is the smaller of the two basins of the Aube reservoir and the smaller of the large Seine lakes. It owes its name to the river Amance, which flows through the lake and takes its name from the commune of Amance, located further south. The lake stretches over the communes of Dienville and Radonvilliers, with populations of 805 and 381 respectively in 2007. It features two islands: "l'île aux Oiseaux" and "l'île aux Carpes", both of which are equipped with a pontoon for boat access.

Lake Amance is the largest lake near Paris devoted to motorboating, yet most of the lake's coves are closed to all activity, notably to protect local birdlife. The lake's marina is Port-Dienville, with a water depth of 3 m, compared with 5 to 12 m for the whole lake. With a capacity of 240 berths, it is the headquarters of the Champagne-Ardenne gendarmerie's nautical brigade. It is located right next to the lake's sole beach. Fishing is available day and night on the lake's shores. In addition, there are eight picnic areas, two stadiums for personal watercraft and water skiing, and other sports facilities (soccer pitch, table tennis, etc.).

The lake is also a bird-watching area, attracting many tourists from summer to spring. The Radonvilliers dike and the ornithological observatory are the best places to discover the lake's wildlife.

=== Lake Du Temple ===
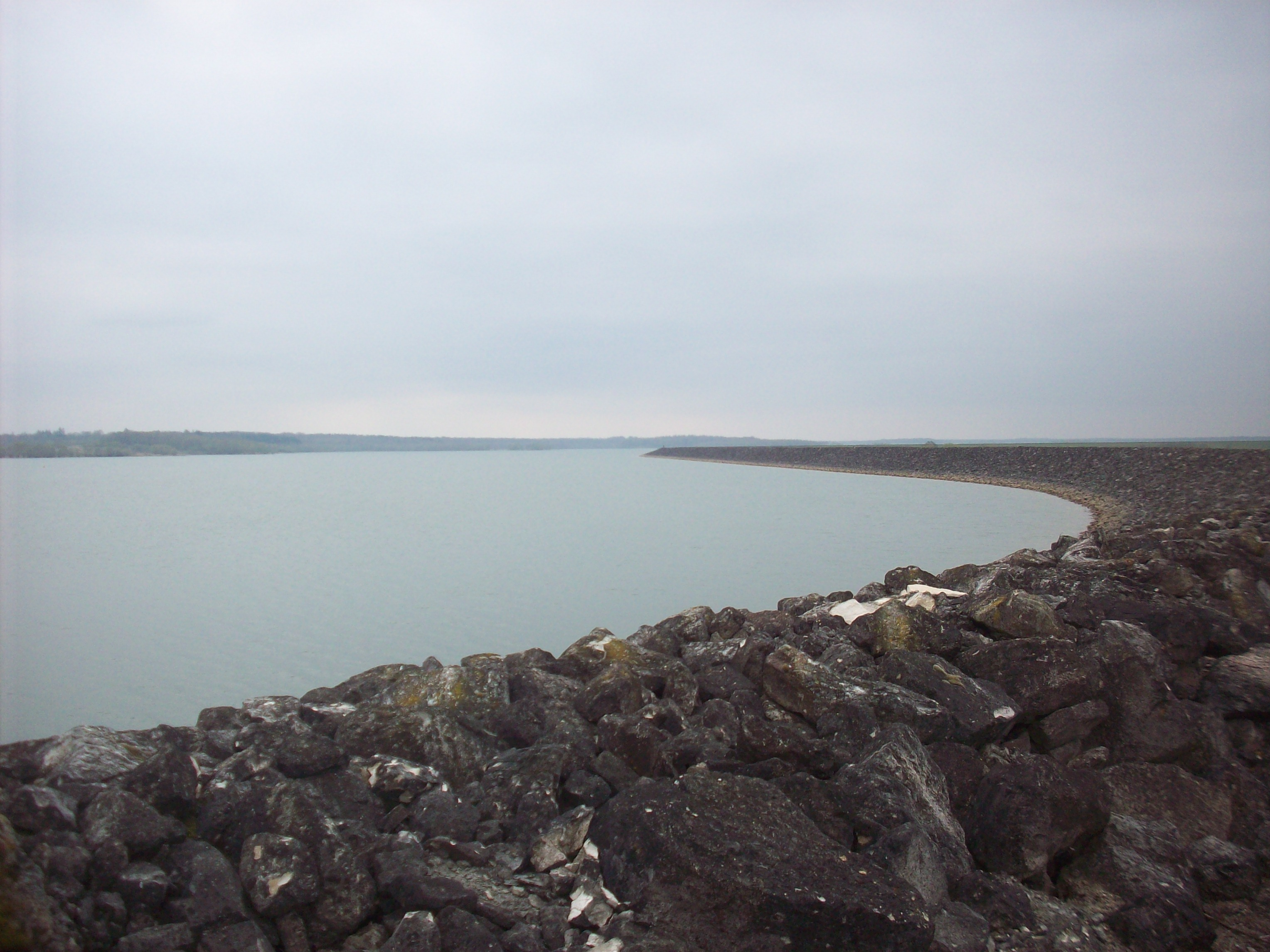
Lac du Temple, seen from the Brévonnes dike.

The surface area of Lac du Temple, at 1,840 ha, is much larger than that of the neighboring lake. Its capacity is also much greater than that of Lake Amance: 148 hm3 versus just 22 hm3. It is located in the municipalities of Amance, Brévonnes, Mathaux, Piney, and Radonvilliers, with a total population of 2,791 (as of January 1, 2007). The name Lac du Temple comes from the Templars, who settled in the area in the Middle Ages, giving their name to the Forêt du Temple and the Forêt d'Orient, which surround the lake. It was formerly known as "Lac Auzon-Temple", (Note: Google Maps still uses the name Auzon-Temple .) after the river Auzon, whose upper valley was partly drowned by the lake.

Lac du Temple is renowned for its calm, ideal for fishing, and is sometimes described as "the kingdom of fishing and small sails", as motor boats are not allowed here. Fishing and sailing are only permitted in the eastern part of the lake. The western part of the lake is occupied by the national nature reserve of the Forêt d'Orient, which includes its two main coves: "Anse d'Auzon" and "Anse du Temple"; the lake has only one unnamed island. There are two surrounding ponds: Jonchery and Grand Orient. What's more, the Valois, Grand Orient, Fontaine aux Oiseaux, and Frouasse dikes were built "on the lake", creating new ponds on its shores.

== Hydrology ==
Like the other large Seine lakes, the Aube reservoir is managed by the Institution interdépartementale des barrages-réservoirs du bassin de la Seine (IIBRBS). It is divided into two basins, Lake Amance and Lake du Temple, with a total surface area of 2,320 ha, and controls a watershed of 1,650 km2. Both lakes are enclosed by natural relief and 13.5 km of earthen dikes, built at the same time as the reservoir lake. Lake Amance is also crossed by the river of the same name; the Auzon, whose valley was destroyed by Lake du Temple, now rises here.

Between November 1 and June 30, water from the Aube is drawn from Jessains via a 4.4-km-long feeder canal (also known as the "canal d'Amance"), when the river is at its highest level to prevent flooding: this is known as "flood control". The water then flows into Lake Amance, before returning via a 1.5 km-long junction canal to Lake du Temple. From July 1 to October 31, the water is returned to its river of origin at Mathaux via a 3.3-km-long restitution canal. This action, known as "low-water support", takes place when the river flow is at its lowest, thus reducing the risk of drought. If the low-water period is longer than expected, a "reserve tranche" of 20.8 million m3 stored in the lake is released into the Aube. In addition, a "dead section" (3.4 million m3) is always present in the lake to preserve the existing fish stocks.

However, only the level of Lac du Temple varies, while that of Lake Amance remains stable throughout the year. For this reason, only Lake du Temple is emptied every ten years, for inspection and maintenance purposes. The inlet canal is also drained at the same time. During the 2005 decennial draining, over 6,700 tonnes of fish were transferred from Lake du Temple to Lake Amance to ensure their survival.

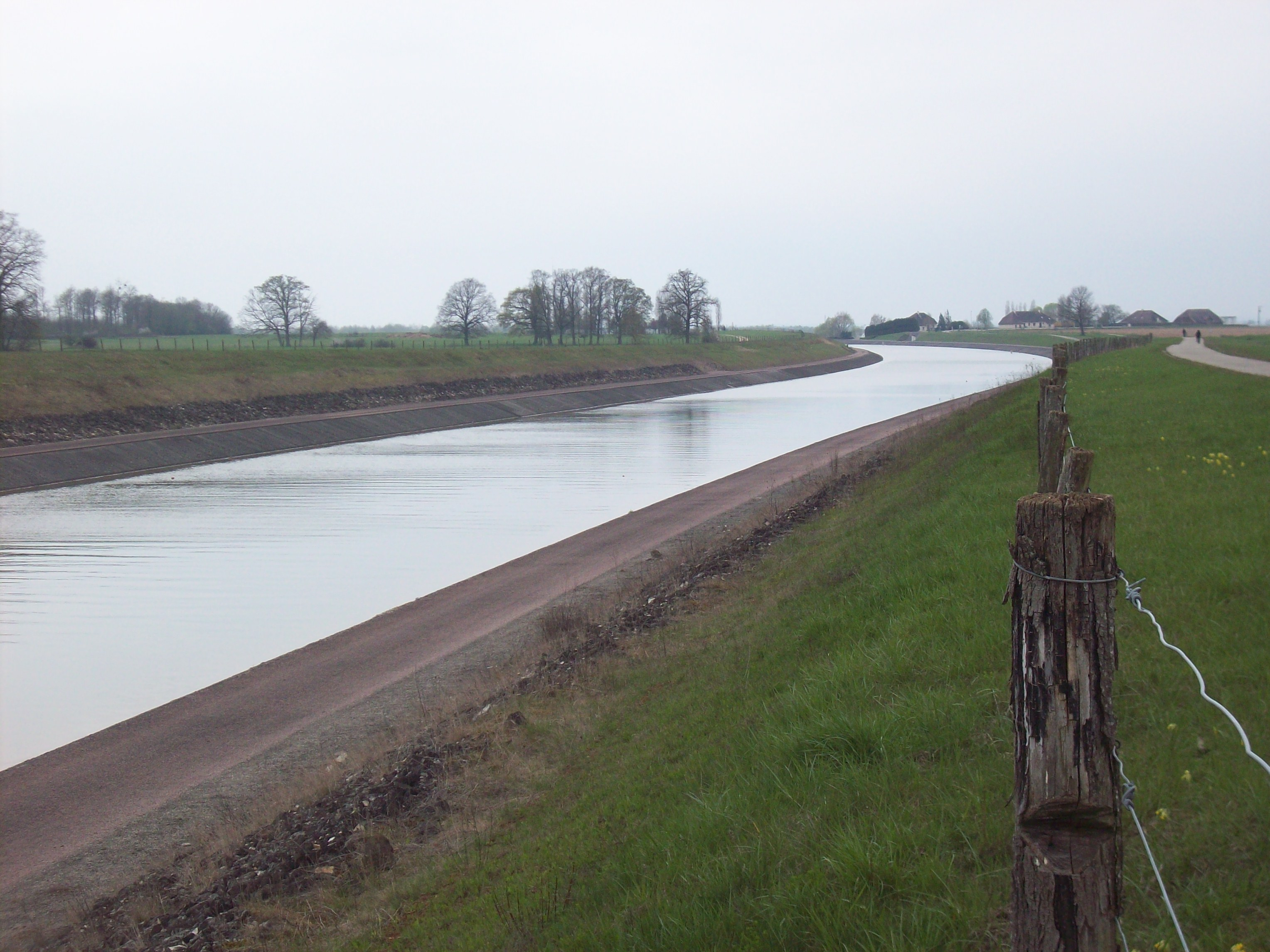
Connecting channel.

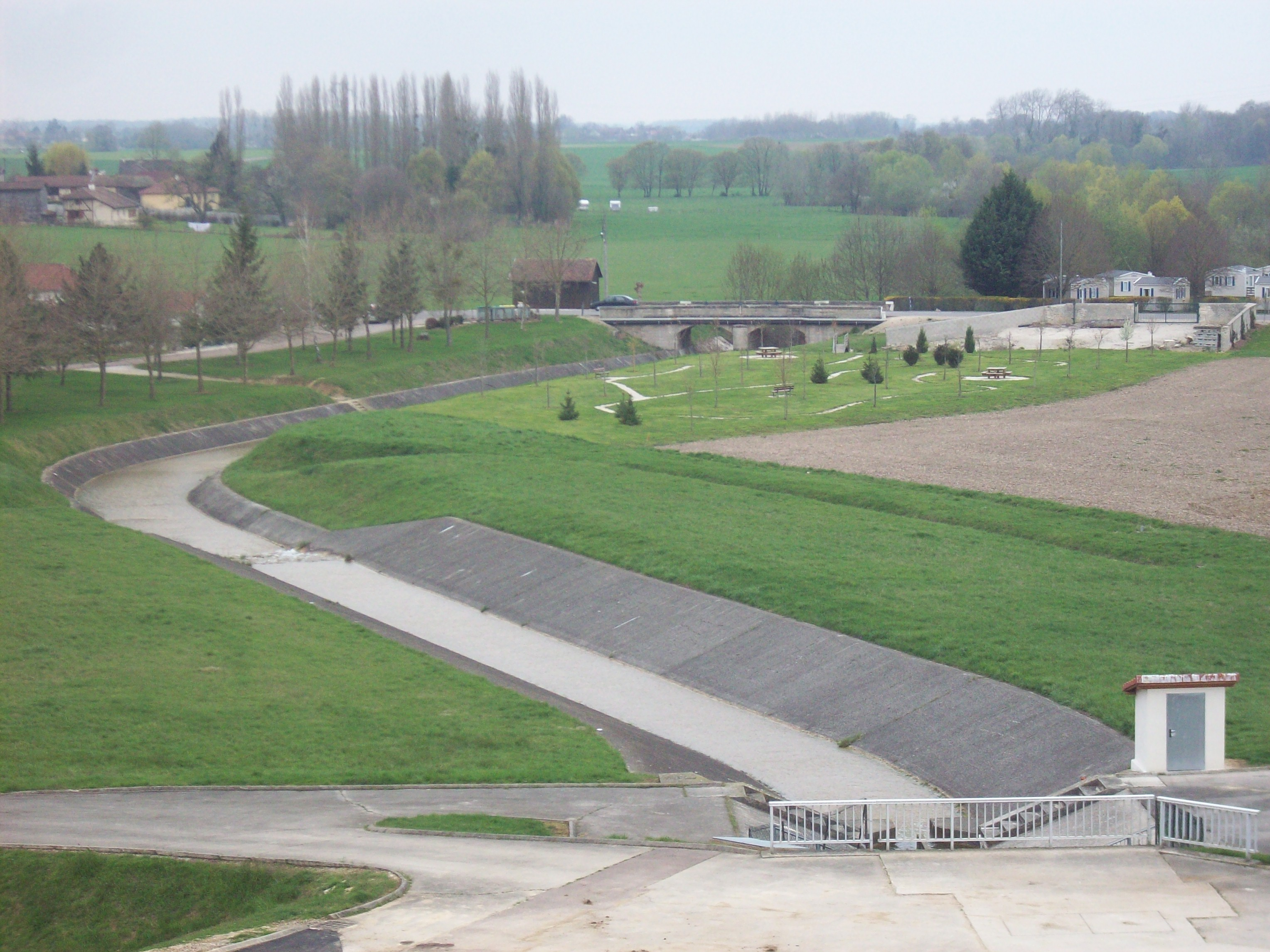
Return to Amance.

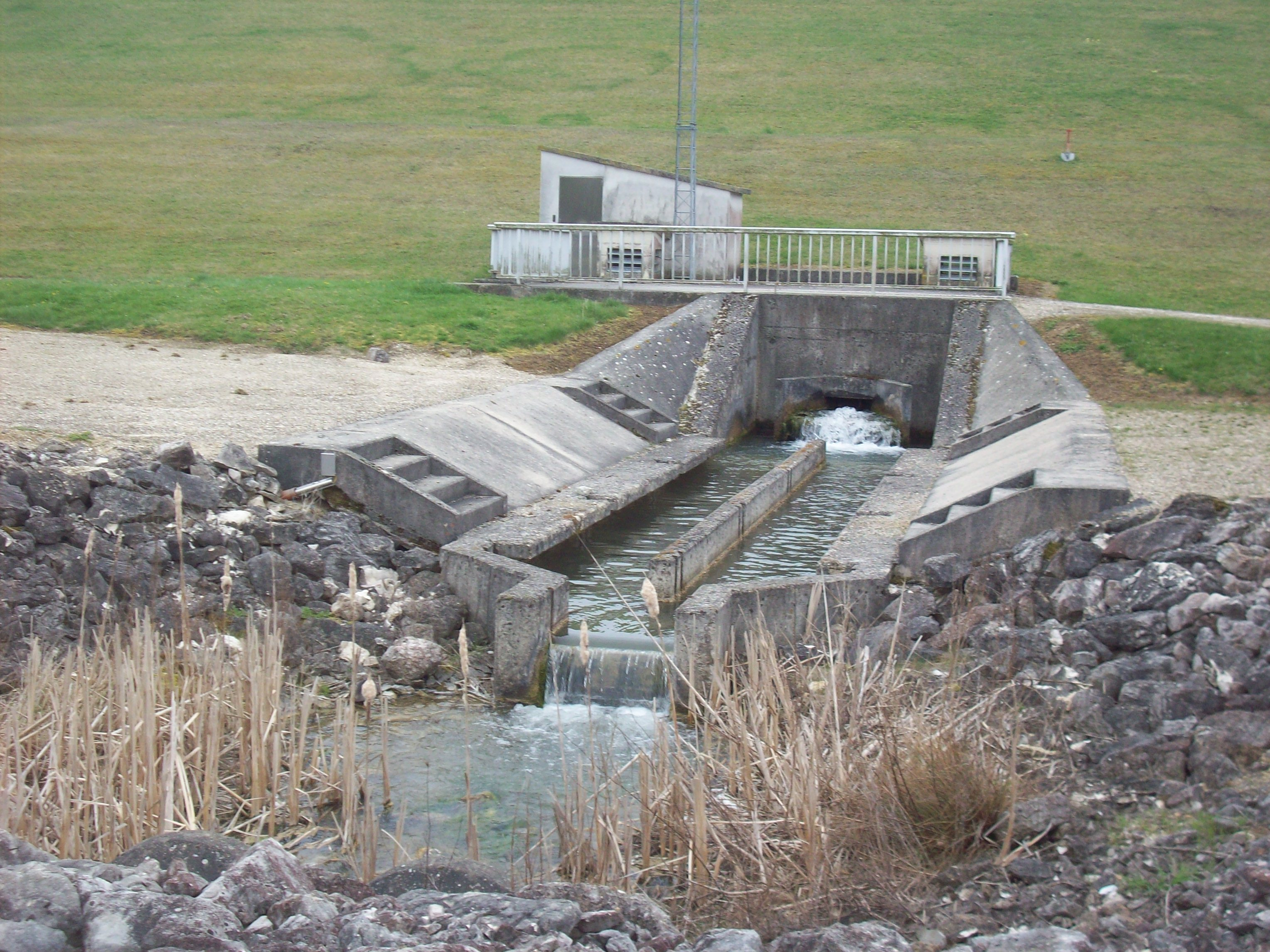
Return to the Auzon river.

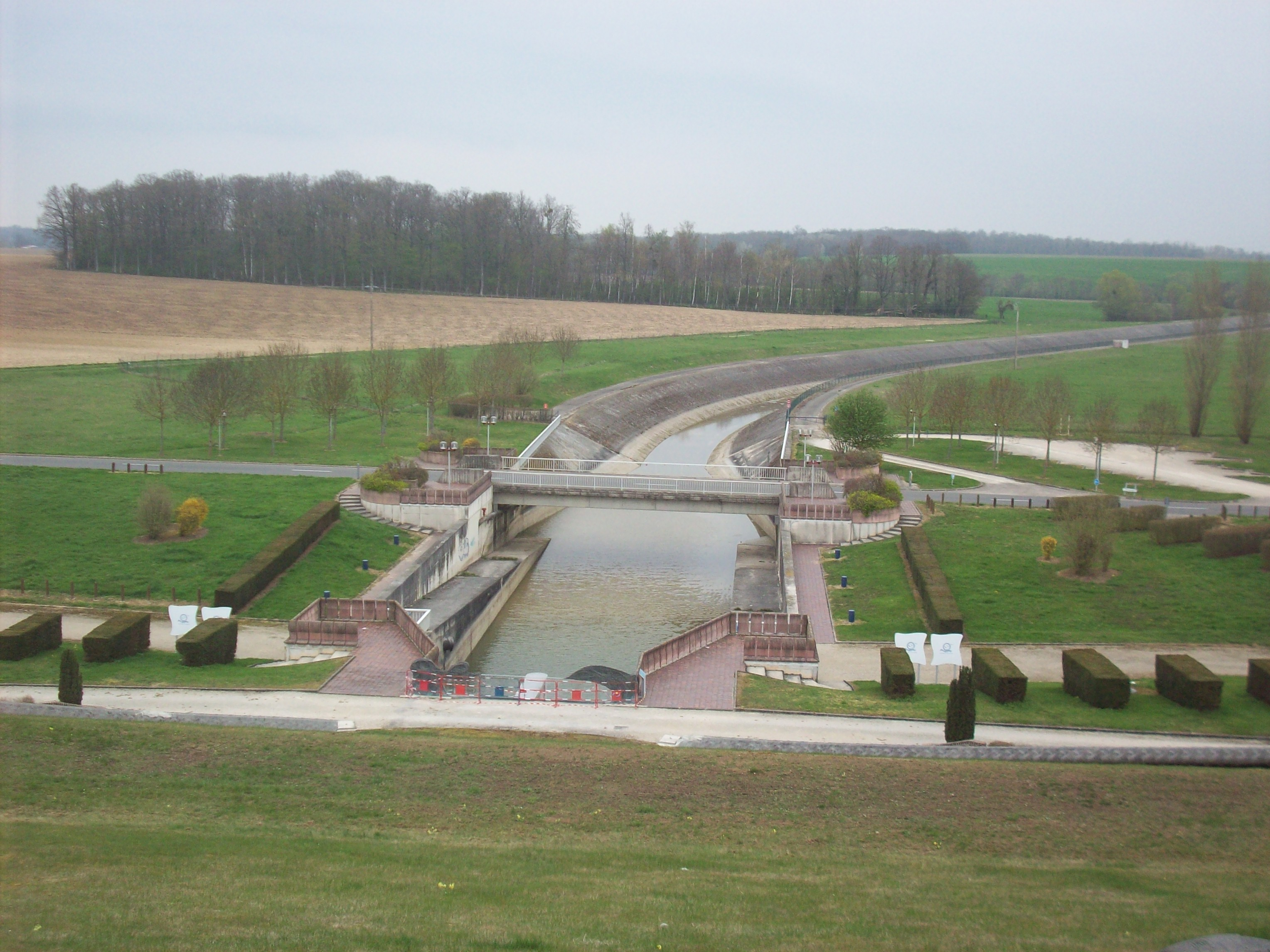
Restitution channel (Aube).

== Weather ==
Lake Amance and Lake du Temple are subject to a continental climate mixed with a degraded oceanic climate. Temperatures are fairly mild, ranging from 5.8 °C to 25.2 °C for maximums. However, some winters are particularly cold, as in 1971, when temperatures dipped to -25.2 °C; summers can also be hot and dry, with a record temperature of 40.6 °C during the 2003 heatwave. The last four months of the year are the rainiest, along with May and June.

Climate data for Lake Amance and Lake du Temple
Month	Jan	Feb	Mar	Apr	May	Jun	Jul	Aug	Sep	Oct	Nov	Dec	Year
Record high °C (°F)	16.2 (61.2)	20.4 (68.7)	23.7 (74.7)	27.8 (82.0)	31.0 (87.8)	35.4 (95.7)	36.6 (97.9)	40.6 (105.1)	31.1 (88.0)	30.3 (86.5)	22.5 (72.5)	19.0 (66.2)	40.6 (105.1)
Mean maximum °C (°F)	5.8 (42.4)	7.5 (45.5)	11.6 (52.9)	14.5 (58.1)	19.0 (66.2)	22.1 (71.8)	25.2 (77.4)	25.2 (77.4)	21.1 (70.0)	16.0 (60.8)	9.7 (49.5)	6.9 (44.4)	15.4 (59.7)
Mean minimum °C (°F)	−0.3 (31.5)	−0.2 (31.6)	2.0 (35.6)	3.3 (37.9)	7.3 (45.1)	10.4 (50.7)	12.4 (54.3)	12.0 (53.6)	9.4 (48.9)	6.5 (43.7)	2.5 (36.5)	1.0 (33.8)	5.6 (42.1)
Record low °C (°F)	−25.2 (−13.4)	−25.0 (−13.0)	−15.4 (4.3)	−6.2 (20.8)	−3.5 (25.7)	0.4 (32.7)	1.6 (34.9)	1.1 (34.0)	−1.9 (28.6)	−7.0 (19.4)	−11.1 (12.0)	−21.0 (−5.8)	−25.2 (−13.4)
Average rainfall mm (inches)	51 (2.0)	47 (1.9)	51 (2.0)	51 (2.0)	61 (2.4)	58 (2.3)	48 (1.9)	49 (1.9)	55 (2.2)	64 (2.5)	52 (2.0)	64 (2.5)	653 (25.7)
Source: Temperature data from Troyes-Barberey

== History ==
When the Seine flooded Paris at the beginning of the 20th century, the French government and the Seine department decided to create reservoir lakes to control flooding and provide the Seine with summer water. Since then, three lakes have been built: Lac de Pannecière (1949), Lac d'Orient (1966) and Lac du Der-Chantecoq (1974). At 248.3 km, the Aubewas the largest tributary of the Seine not managed by the Grands lacs de Seine (upstream of Paris).

Although several projects were studied in the 1920s and stopped in 1950, the Aube reservoir was not completed until 1990. Indeed, the need for this lake in the public interest was not publicly recognized until 1977. In addition, financial problems, local opposition, and the disappearance of the Seine department slowed down the project. The land was therefore negotiated in exchange for compensation, including the restoration of former water bodies in the vicinity.

Work began in 1983, and over 3,000 hectares of land, shared between nine communes, were required to build the reservoir lake, most of it forest and pond. Today, it is managed by the Institution interdépartementale des barrages-réservoirs du bassin de la Seine.

In early May 2013, faced with the flooding of the Aube, the Établissement Public Territorial de Bassin took the decision to use the 50 cm "exceptional tranche" and continue filling Lake Amance and Lake du Temple. As a result, at 8 a.m. on May 7, the quantity of water contained in Lake Amance and Lake du Temple reached 182.68 million m3 out of a maximum capacity of 183.50 million m3, i.e. a filling rate rounded to the nearest unit of 100%. Extraction was stopped at 11 p.m. Following these floods, several communes including Buchères, Verrières and Bréviandes were hit by water inundation.

== Flora and fauna ==
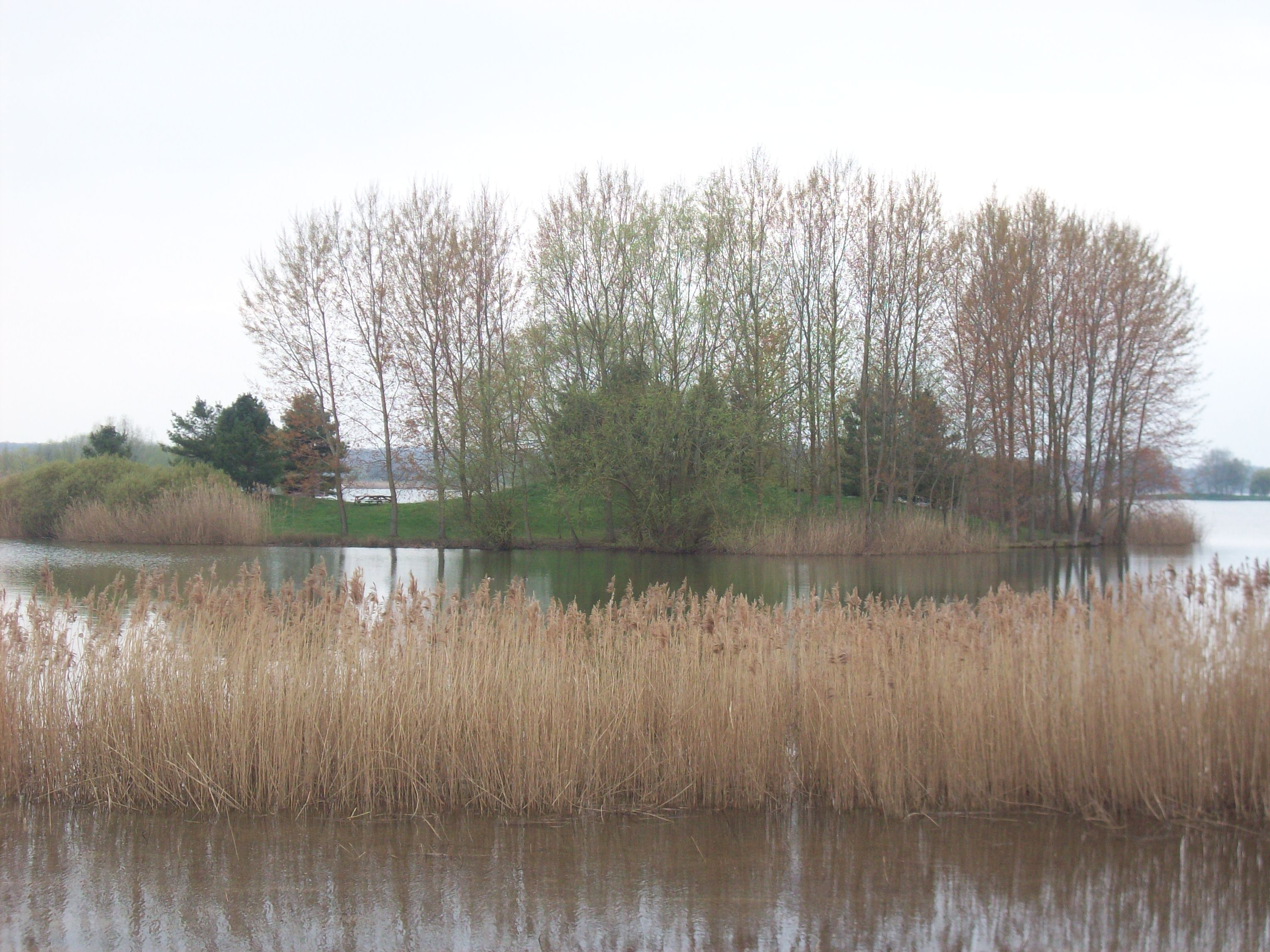
Reeds in front of Carp Island.

At Lake du Temple, the local flora is essentially due to variations in water level. Pondweeds, water lilies, and Characeae (especially on Lake Amance) are present. There are also duckweeds and reeds (broad-leaved cattail, phragmites). Around the lakes, willow, alder, and ash gradually give way to oak and hornbeam forests.

The three "Lakes of the Orient Forest" are part of a 23,575-hectare Natura 2000 special protection area. The "Etangs de la Champagne humide", of which the two lakes are a part, have been classified under the Ramsar Convention since 1991. Lake du Temple is part of the 1,560-hectare "Forêt d'Orient National Nature Reserve", created in 2002. Shared with Lake Orient, this nature reserve is home to 531 species of fungi, 400 plants, 907 insects, 52 bryophytes, 17 fish, 11 amphibians, 5 reptiles, and 212 birds. There are also 41 mammal species, including 11 bats.

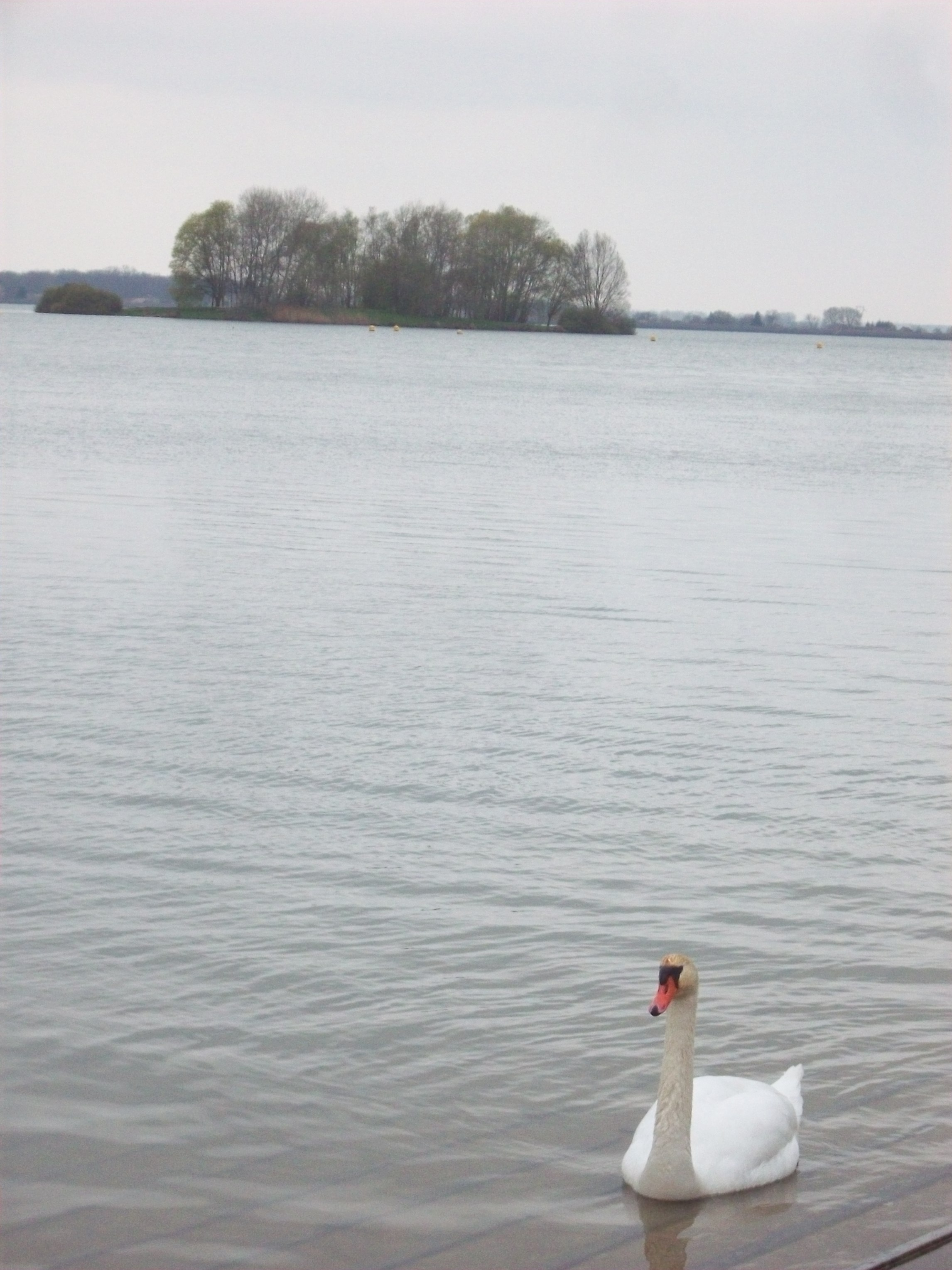
A swan in front of Bird Island.

Thanks to the large mudflats left by the waters, many birds, particularly waders (35 species have been recorded on the lake), spend time here. What's more, the lake's low water volume makes fish an easily accessible prey for large birds, notably herons. The main species inhabiting the lake and surrounding area are the great egret (Egretta alba), bar-tailed godwit (Limosa lapponica) and black-tailed godwits (Limosa limosa), osprey (Pandion halietus) and common snipe (Gallinago gallinago), sandpipers (Calidris alpina), little stint (Calidris minuta), Temminck's stint (Calidris temminckii), sanderling (Calidris alba) and curlew sandpiper (Calidris ferruginea), mallard (Anas platyrhynchos) and northern shoveler (Anas clypeata), common greenshank (Tringa nebularia), spotted redshank (Tringa erythropus) and common redshank (Tringa totanus), curlew (Numenius arquata), warbler (Phylomachus pugnax), coot (Fulica atra), creat crested grebe (Podiceps cristatus) and little grebe (Tachybaptus ruficollis), grey (Ardea cinerea) and purple (Ardea purpurea) herons, greylag (Anser anser) and greater white-fronted (Anser albifrons) geese, golden (Pluvialis apricaria) and grey (Pluvialis squatarola) plovers, Eurasian teal (Anas crecca) and northern lapwing (Vanellus vanellus). The lakes of the Aube region are best known for the thousands of sandhill cranes that stop here in November (over 20,000) and for being France's main site for the post-mating stopover of the black stork (Ciconia nigra).

The lakes are also home to a wide variety of fish, mainly: pike, carp, roach, perch, pike-perch, tench, and trout. Night carp fishing in particular is attracting more and more fishing tourists. Big fish are also frequently caught here, including a former European record for common carp at 66 lbs.

== Turism ==
=== Infrastructures ===
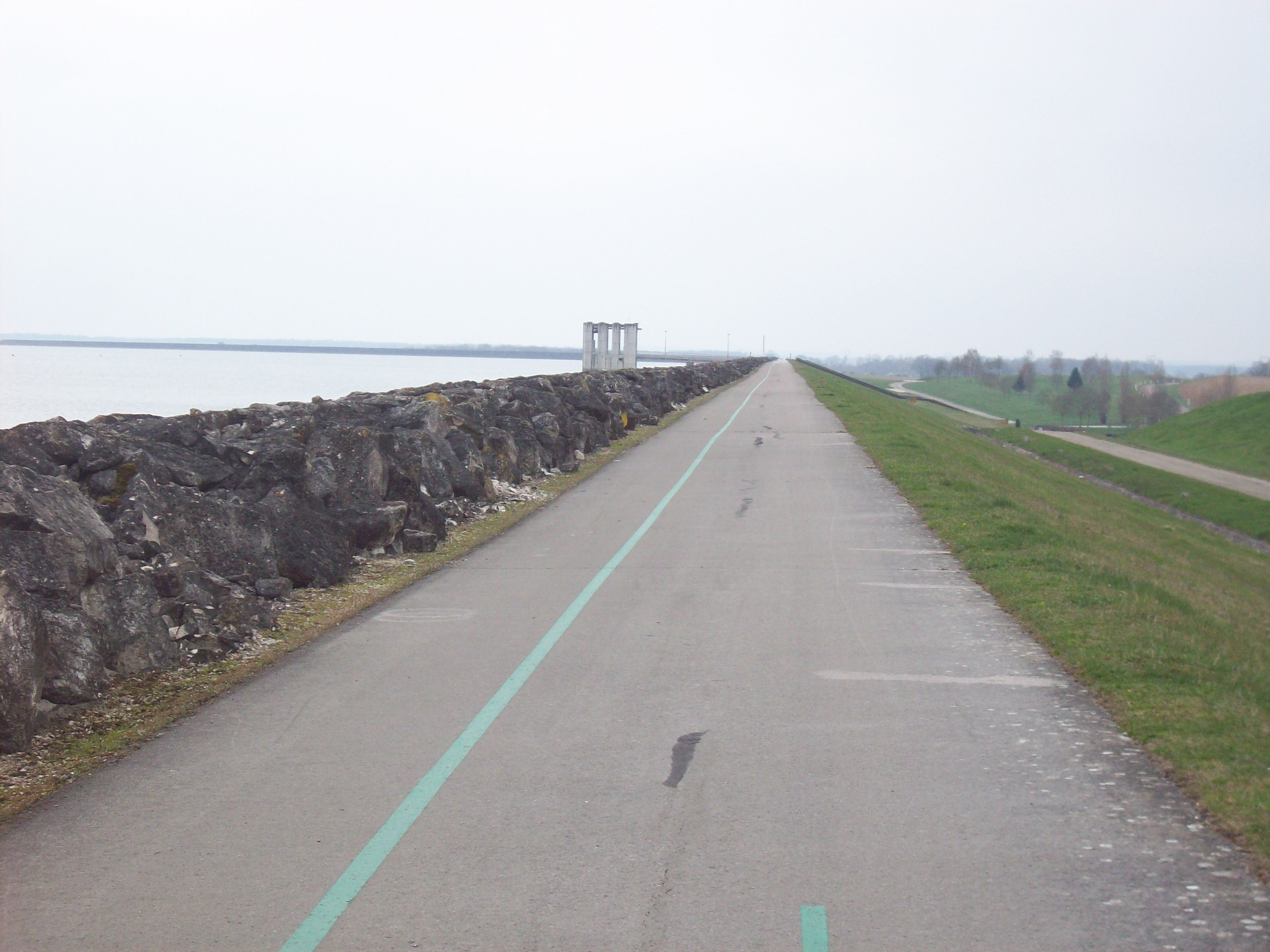
La bike lane of the lakes.

Both lakes are accessible by freeway from Reims (130 km) via the A26, and from Paris (180 km) and Dijon (160 km) via the A5 and A31. They can also be reached by route départementale 11, between Piney and Dienville, by route départementale 443, from Brienne or Vendeuvre, and by route départementale 43, from nearby Lac d'Orient, itself linked to Troyes by the former route nationale 19, now route départementale 619. The nearest airport is Troyes-Barberey.

Unlike the other large Seine lakes in the Champagne region, which have three or four beaches, the Aube reservoir has only one, at Dienville. However, the reservoir is also well equipped in terms of bicycle paths: a green bike lane links Port-Dienville to Saint-Julien-les-Villas and Troyes, 42 and 47 km away respectively; this cycle route runs along the north side of the two basins, and there are plans to extend it to the south of Lake Amance.

For accommodation, there are eleven gîtes, two guest chambers, two campsites, and one hotel in the direct vicinity of the two lakes (in the communes of Amance, Brévonnes, Dienville, Mathaux, and Radonvilliers). There are many other places to stay in the surrounding villages.

== Surroundings ==
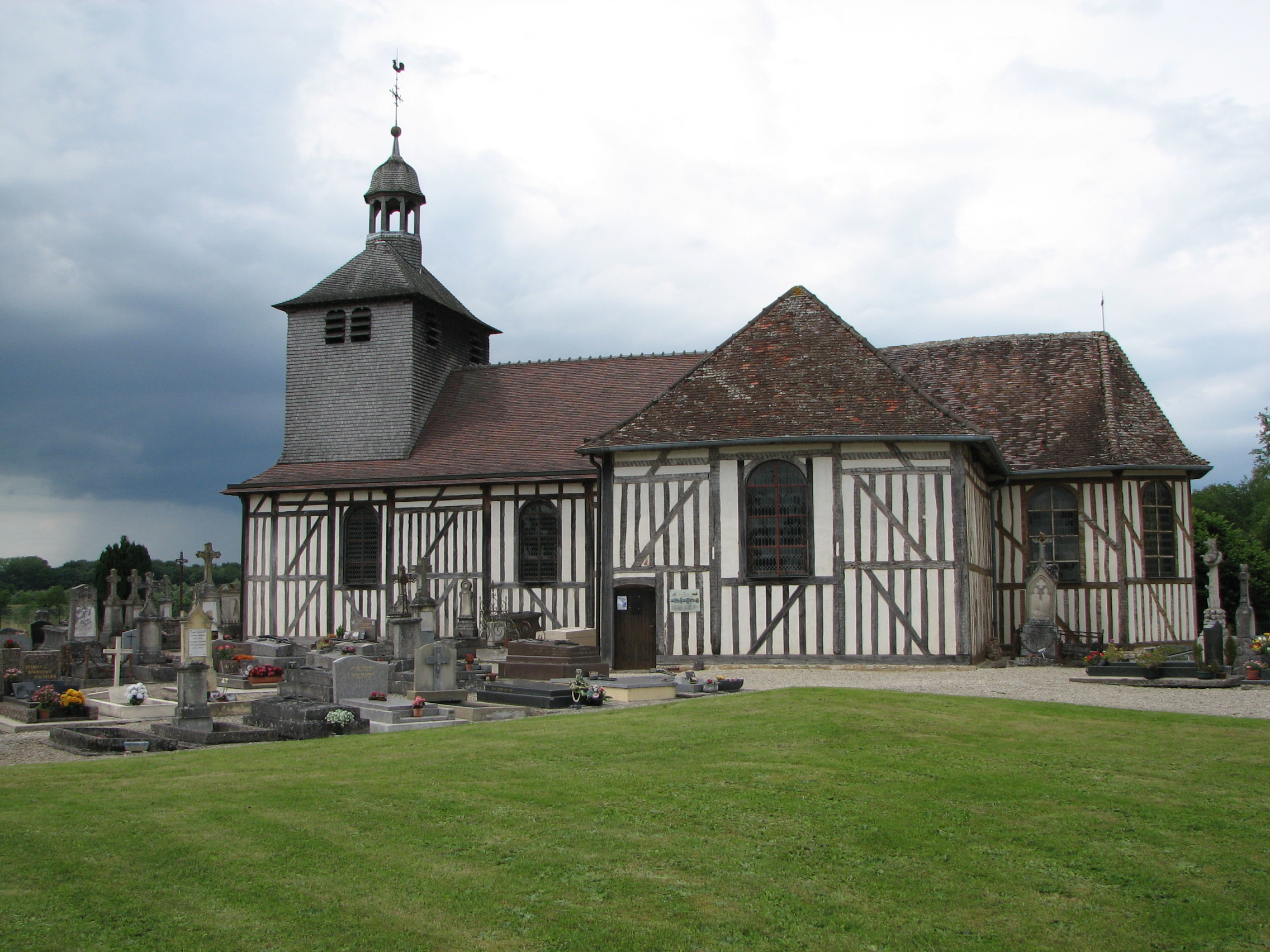
Saint-Quentin church in Mathaux.

The Grands Lacs de Champagne Tourist Office in Brienne-le-Château and Soulaines-Dhuys, and in Dienville in summer, welcomes and informs visitors, and offers temporary exhibitions and a wide range of local products. The "Maison du Parc Naturel Régional" welcomes visitors and exhibitions in a former 16th-century bourgeois mansion, between Lac du Temple and Lac d'Orient, which is also an ideal place for birdwatching. However, the lakes of the Orient Forest are less well known in this respect than Lac du Der-Chantecoq, which attracts over a million tourists a year. It, too, is located in the Champagne region, less than forty kilometers away, (Note: Distance between Dienville and Giffaumont-Champaubert on Mappy) and is renowned for the tens of thousands of sandhill cranes that stop off here.

The two lakes are also a crossing point on the Route Nationale 19, between the department's prefecture, Troyes, renowned for its medieval city center and factory outlets, and the Nigloland amusement park in Dolancourt, France's third-busiest, with around 500,000 visitors a year. To the northeast of the lakes, a route of timber-framed churches stretches from Mathaux, just north of the Lac-Reservoir, to Arrigny, near Lac du Der, linking a group of religious buildings unique to France.

== See also ==
- Orient Forest Regional Natural Park
- EPTB Seine Grands Lacs
