= EPTB Seine Grands Lacs =

French water management institution

- EPTB Seine Grands Lacs

Établissement public territorial de bassin (Public territorial basin institution) overview
- Jurisdiction: Government of France
- Headquarters: 48°50′29.14″N 2°22′30.89″E
- Website: www.seinegrandslacs.fr

EPTB Seine Grands Lacs is a public territorial basin institution created in 1969 under the name of Institution interdépartementale des barrages-réservoirs du bassin de la Seine. Grouping together the departments of the former Seine, its mission is to reduce the winter and spring floods of the Seine and its main tributaries (the Yonne, Marne and Aube) and to support their summer and autumn flows. The EPTB Seine Grands Lacs acts within the framework of the Seine Plan to reduce the vulnerability of territories to flooding.

It was formerly known as Grands lacs de Seine. By extension, the term "Grands lacs de Seine" also refers to all the artificial lakes in Burgundy and Champagne-Ardenne, built and managed by this establishment. Their total surface area is 101 km^{2}, equivalent to that of the city of Paris. EPTB Seine Grands Lacs is currently working on a project to build a new structure in the Bassée area (Seine-et-Marne), designed to complete the flood protection system and reduce the foreseeable damage associated with these phenomena.

== History ==
=== Before the IIBRBS ===
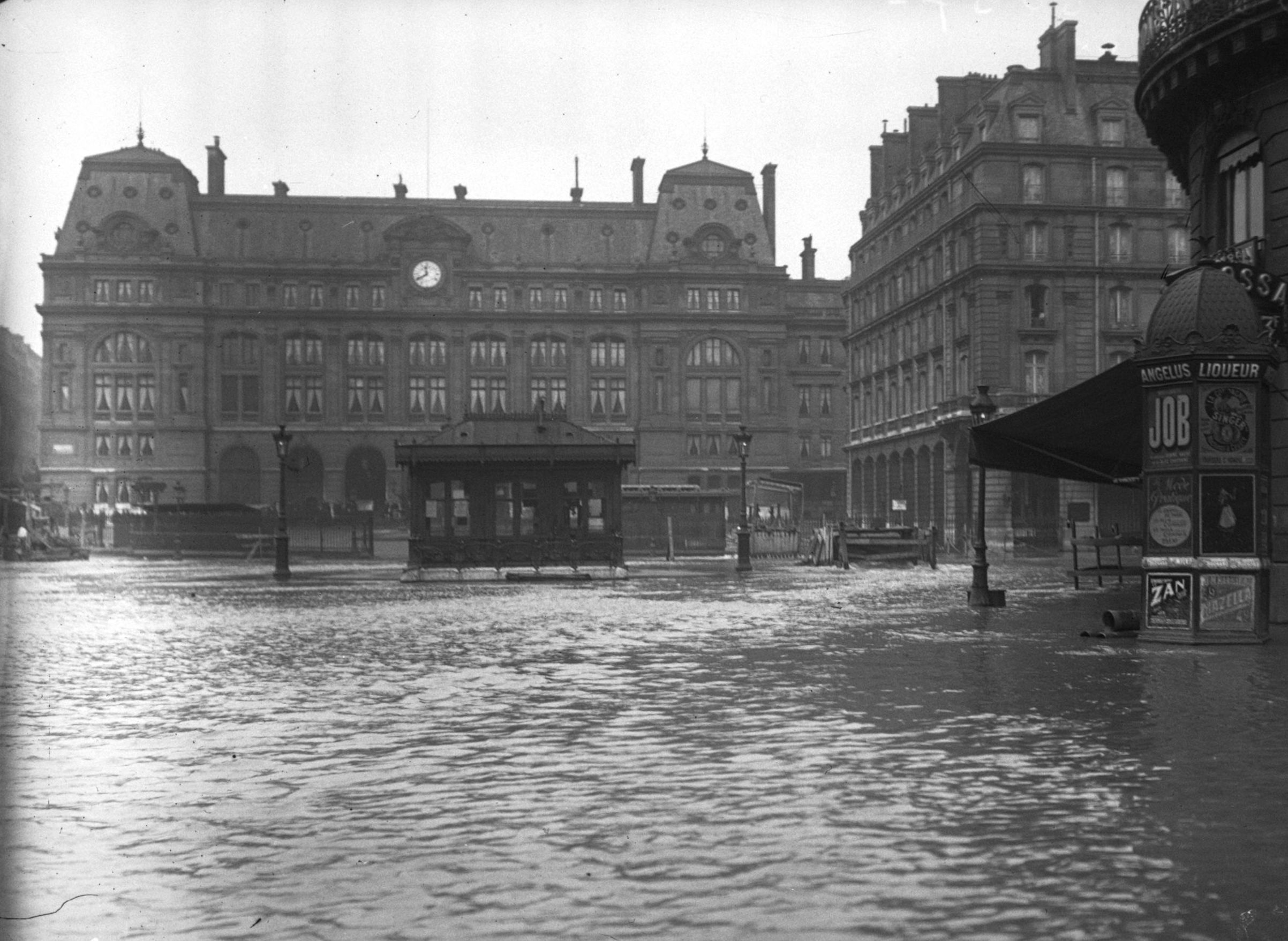
Gare Saint-Lazare during the 1910 flood

Around January 20, 1910, a flood on the Seine inundated many Parisian streets and 20,000 buildings, affecting around 200,000 of the city's inhabitants. On January 22, the Paris metro was also flooded. It took 45 days for the Seine to return to its normal level. Damage amounted to 400 million gold francs. Following this flood and the one of 1924, which also affected Paris and its surrounding area, as well as the droughts of the 1920s, the State and the Seine department decided to manage the Seine and its tributaries upstream of the capital, in order to regulate the river's course.

In 1949, the first "grand lac de Seine", Lac de Pannecière, was commissioned on the Yonne. In 1966, while the Marne reservoir was under construction, the Lake of Orient or Seine reservoir was inaugurated near Troyes, in the Champagne region. At the time, the Seine department was responsible for managing these three lakes and their construction.

=== Creation of the institution ===
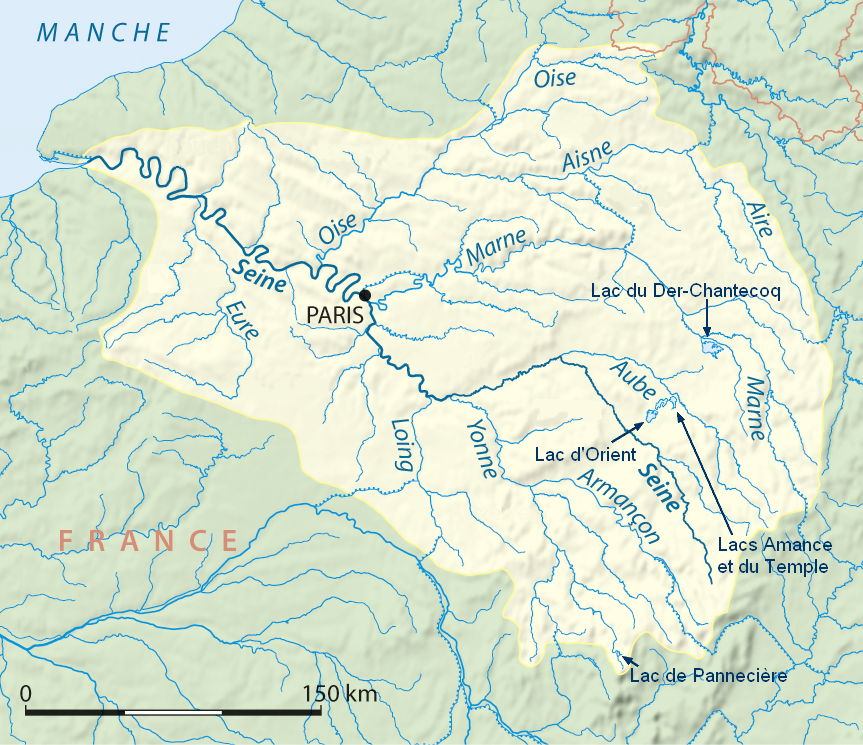
Map of the Seine drainage basin and the large Seine lakes

On June 16, 1969, following the disappearance of the Seine department a year earlier, a ministerial decree officially created the "Institution interdépartementale des barrages-réservoirs du bassin de la Seine" (IIBRBS). This public basin institution is now managed by the general councils of the four departments belonging to the Seine basin: Paris, Hauts-de-Seine, Seine-Saint-Denis, and Val-de-Marne. Its mission is to increase the flow of the Seine and its tributaries during low-water periods (to ensure the water resources required by the Paris conurbation) and to protect the Île-de-France region from flooding by means of the lake reservoirs it manages.

=== From 1969 onwards ===
1974 saw the inauguration of Lac du Der-Chantecoq (Marne reservoir lake), which became France's largest artificial lake. Between 1989 and 1990, Lake Amance and Lake du Temple, a diversion from the Aube, were impounded.

Today, the organization is funded 50.02% by the municipality of Paris and 16.66% by each of the other three departments in the inner suburbs. It is governed by a Board of Directors comprising 24 members (12 for Paris, 4 for Hauts-de-Seine, 4 for Seine-Saint-Denis and 4 for Val-de-Marne), appointed by the general councillors of these departments. The institution was chaired from 2001 to 2012 by Pascal Popelin, then First Deputy Mayor of Livry-Gargan and vice-president of the Seine-Saint-Denis General Council. It employs 130 people, most of whom are involved in maintenance.

In 2011, the IIBRBS became the Établissement public territorial de bassin (EPTB) Seine Grands Lacs. In 2012, Pascal Popelin left the General Council and was replaced as president by General Councillor Frédéric Molossi. President Molossi was re-elected President of the EPTB Seine Grands on June 11, 2014.

== Lake reservoirs ==
List of lake reservoirs managed by EPTB Seine Grands Lacs, in chronological order of construction. Note that the Crescent and Chaumeçon reservoirs are made available to the institution by EDF.

=== Lac de Pannecière ===
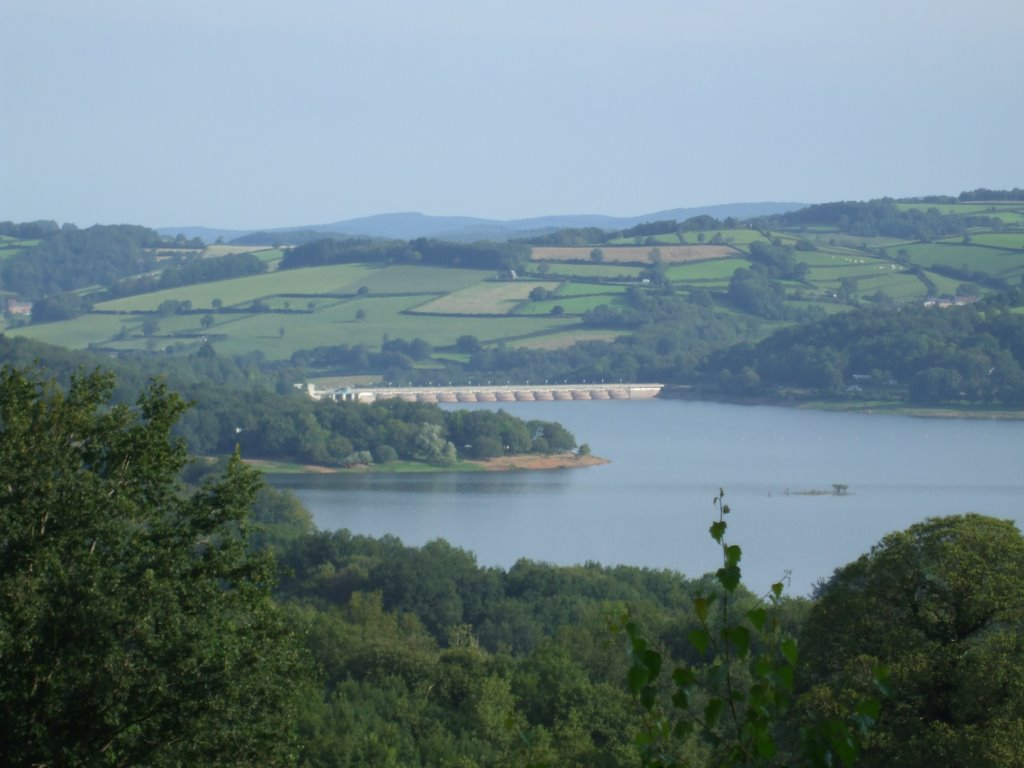
Lac de Pannecière and its dam.

"Lac de Pannecière" or "Lac de Pannecière - Chaumard-sur-l'Yonne" was the first of the Seine's grands lacs to be built; it was inaugurated in 1949 and the Pannecière dam was commissioned in 1950. The lake results from the closure of the Yonne valley by a multiple-arch dam, (Note: The other three lakes, not built on the granite soils of the Morvan but on the clays of humid Champagne, were created by closing off secondary valleys with earthen dykes to form river bypass basins, where the water is conveyed by diversion canals (inlet, eventually junction or return).) and is the only lake in Burgundy to be managed by the EPTB. It lies at the confluence of the Yonne and Houssière rivers, in the Nièvre département, not far from the town of Château-Chinon. With a surface area of 5.2 km^{2} and a capacity of 82.5 million m^{3}, it is the largest of the large Morvan lakes. It is also part of the Morvan Regional Natural Park.

=== Lake of Orient ===
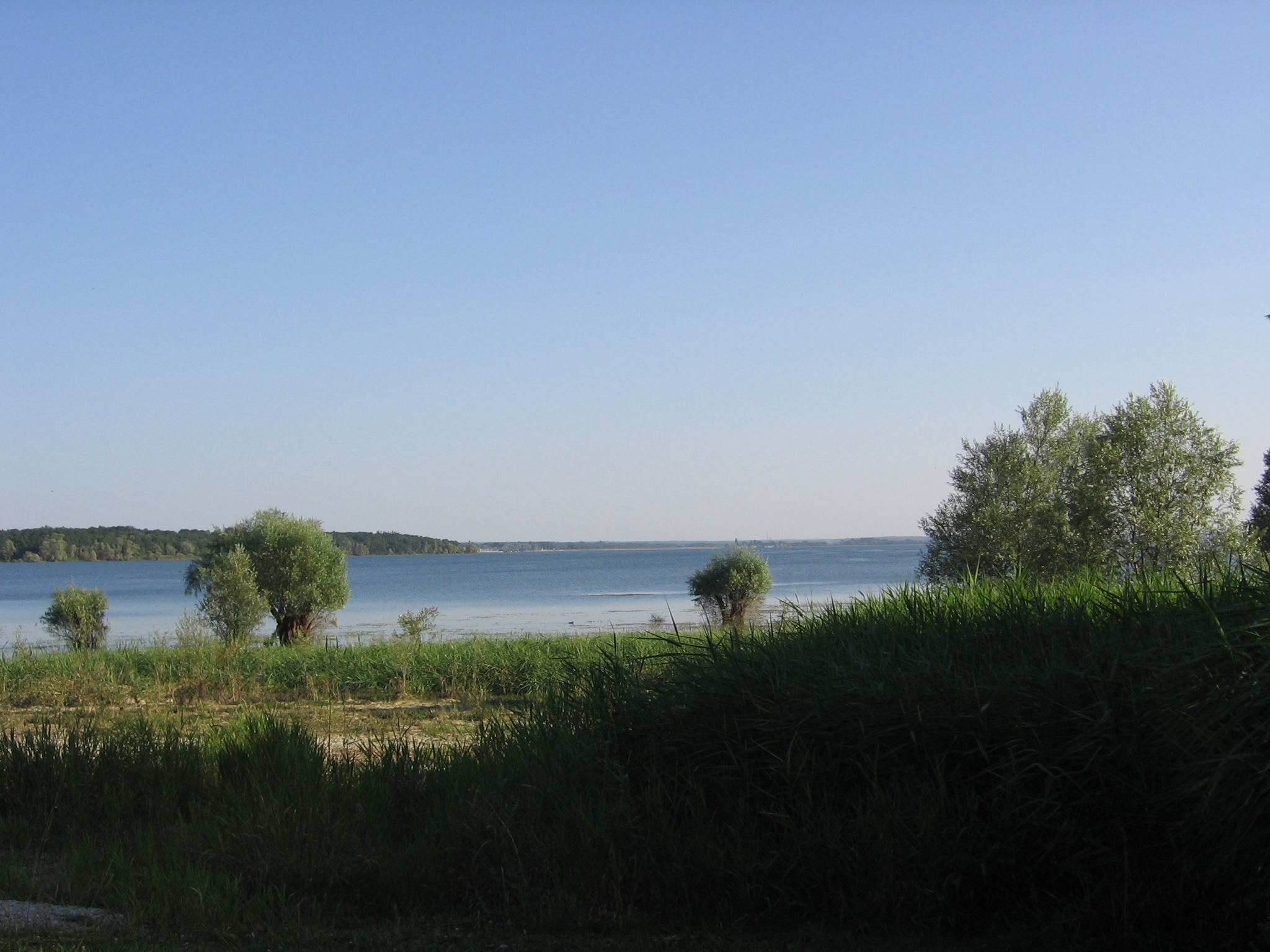
View of Lake Orient and its forest.

"Lake of Orient" or "lac-réservoir Seine" is located in the Aube region of Champagne-Ardenne, a dozen kilometers from Troyes. With a surface area of 23 km^{2} and a normal capacity of 205 million m^{3}, it is the third-largest artificial lake in France, after Lac du Der-Chantecoq and Lac de Serre-Ponçon and ahead of Lac de Sainte-Croix. Formerly known as "Lac de Lusigny" or "Lac de la forêt d'Orient", it was built to directly regulate the Seine. It was commissioned in 1966, becoming the second-largest lake on the Seine. Today, the lake is part of the Orient Forest Regional Natural Park, from which it takes its name.

=== Lake Der-Chantecoq ===
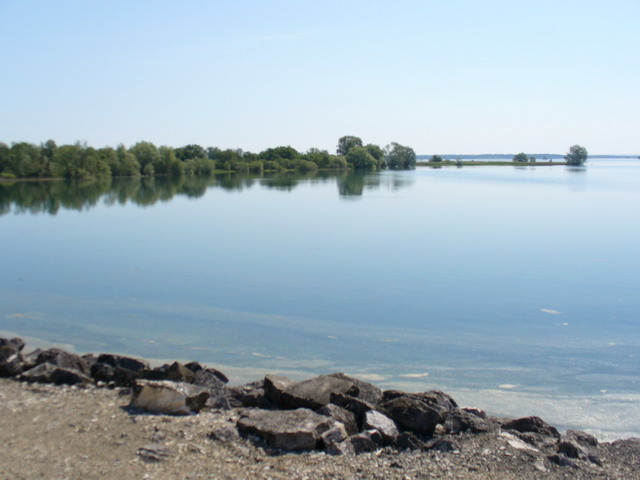
Lake Der-Chantecoq seen from a dyke.

"Lac du Der-Chantecoq" or "lac-réservoir Marne" (often abbreviated to "lac du Der") is the third lake built by the institution and was inaugurated in 1974. It is located in the Champagne-Ardenne region, on the border between the Marne and Haute-Marne departments. Deriving from the Marne and one of its tributaries, the Blaise, the lake owes its name both to the Pays du Der, the natural region in which it is located, and to the village of Chantecoq, which was destroyed along with those of Champaubert-aux-Bois and Nuisement-aux-Bois when it was created. Its rated capacity is 350 million m^{3}. With a surface area of 48 km^{2}, it is the largest artificial lake in Europe, excluding dam lakes. It is also the largest man-made lake in France, all categories combined.

=== Lake Amance ===
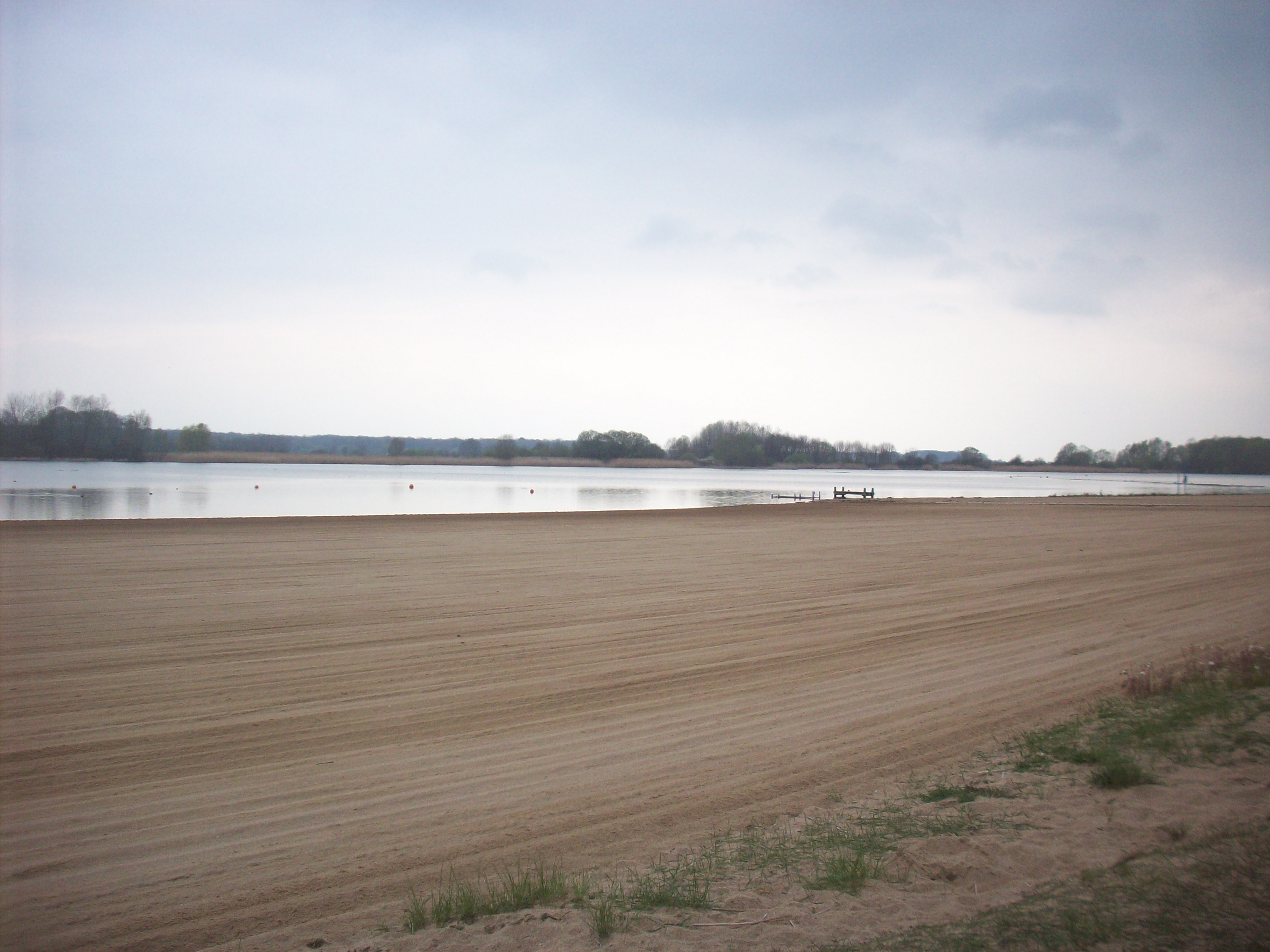
Lake Amance beach.

"Lake Amance" and "Lake du Temple" are in reality two lakes linked by a junction canal. The former takes its name from the river that runs through it, while the latter owes its name to the Knights Templar, who owned land in the area. Both are in the Aube département. While Lake Amance, to the east, is dedicated to motorboating, Lake du Temple, to the west, is given over to the discovery of nature. With their normal capacity of 170 hm^{3} and a total surface area of 23.2 km^{2}, they could, if they formed a single lake, be the third largest artificial lake in France, on a par with Lac d'Orient; they are also part of the Orient Forest Regional Natural Park. They were impounded in 1990, making them the last Seine lakes to be built.

== Lake functioning ==
The four Seine's grand lacs operate in the same way. In winter and spring (November to June), the reservoirs are progressively filled, either via the inlet canals or the dam, since rivers are at their highest during these periods. Additional withdrawals are made during high-water periods, thus limiting flooding: this is "flood control". From July to October, when rivers are at their lowest during the summer, the water in the lakes is released. In the event of exceptional drought, this draining can extend into November and December. By November 1, the lakes are almost empty: all that remains is the "dead slice", the amount of water needed for fish to survive in the lakes, and the "reserve slice", provided for in the event of severe low-water conditions in November and December. The volume of each reservoir lake depends on the extent of flooding and drought. In the event of winter drought, the lakes may have to reduce their catches sharply, thus making a compromise with the need to store water for the summer.

== Results ==
=== Impact on flooding and low-water levels ===
For six years, from 1992 to 1998, the IIBRBS, in partnership with the French government, the Île-de-France region and the Agence de l'Eau Seine-Normandie, carried out a study to estimate the damage caused by a major flood of the Seine in the region, and to report on the impact of the lakes in this context.

According to the study, in the event of a flood like that of 1910, the large lakes would reduce the water level in Paris by 60 cm, which would have the financial effect of reducing the amount of damage to 8.4 billion euros instead of the estimated 12.2 billion euros. This would represent a saving of around 4 billion euros. On the other hand, reservoir lakes can never prevent flooding, only reduce it. Their action is therefore insufficient, all the more so as current reservoirs only influence around 17% of the Seine basin upstream of the capital. Last but not least, the Yonne, reputed to be the most untamable tributary, is also the least controlled by the system.

In 1995, another study carried out by the IIBRBS and the Agence de l'Eau Seine-Normandie showed that, without the reservoirs, the Île-de-France region would face shortages of potable water on several days of the year. According to this study, these shortages would be more frequent on the Marne. However, as in the case of flood control, "low-water support" would not eliminate the effects of a very severe drought, and its action could diminish in the event of a sharp rise in demand, a drop in the quality of resources or major pollution with long-term effects. Increasing the number of reservoir lakes therefore reduces the danger of insufficient storage, hence the fairly recent creation of the Aube reservoir lake.

=== Environmental impact ===
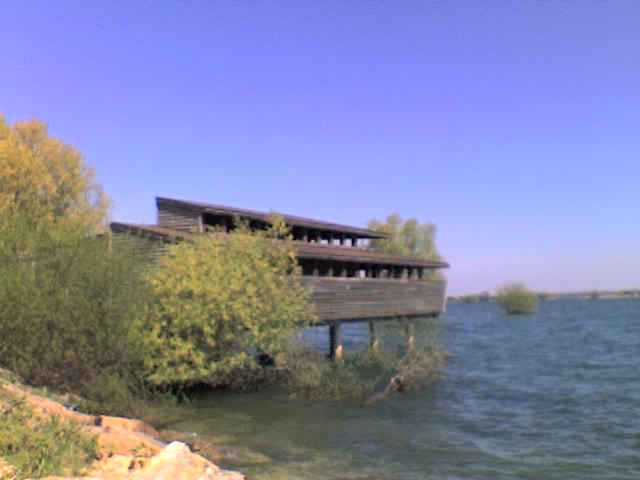
An observatory on Lake Der-Chantecoq.

The environment was profoundly transformed by the construction of these structures, as was the landscape: many hectares of forest were destroyed to build the lakes. They alter the hydraulic regime of rivers, making certain spring floods impossible, even though they are essential for northern pike reproduction. In addition, the Lac de Pannecière prevents the free movement of trout, limiting their reproduction downstream of the dam during the winter. Nevertheless, their "ecological quality" has made them an important passageway for the grey crane and other bird species during their migration.

The three Champagne-Ardenne lakes have been recognized by the Ramsar Convention since 1991, as part of the "Étangs de la Champagne humide" site. They are also part of the special protection areas of the Natura 2000 network of "Lac du Der" and "Lacs de la forêt d'Orient". The latter are located within the territory of the Orient Forest Regional Natural Park. In addition, every year, over 1.5 million visitors flock to the Seine's grand lacs and their infrastructure, including marinas, cycle paths, hiking trails, beaches, and observatories.

== Projects ==
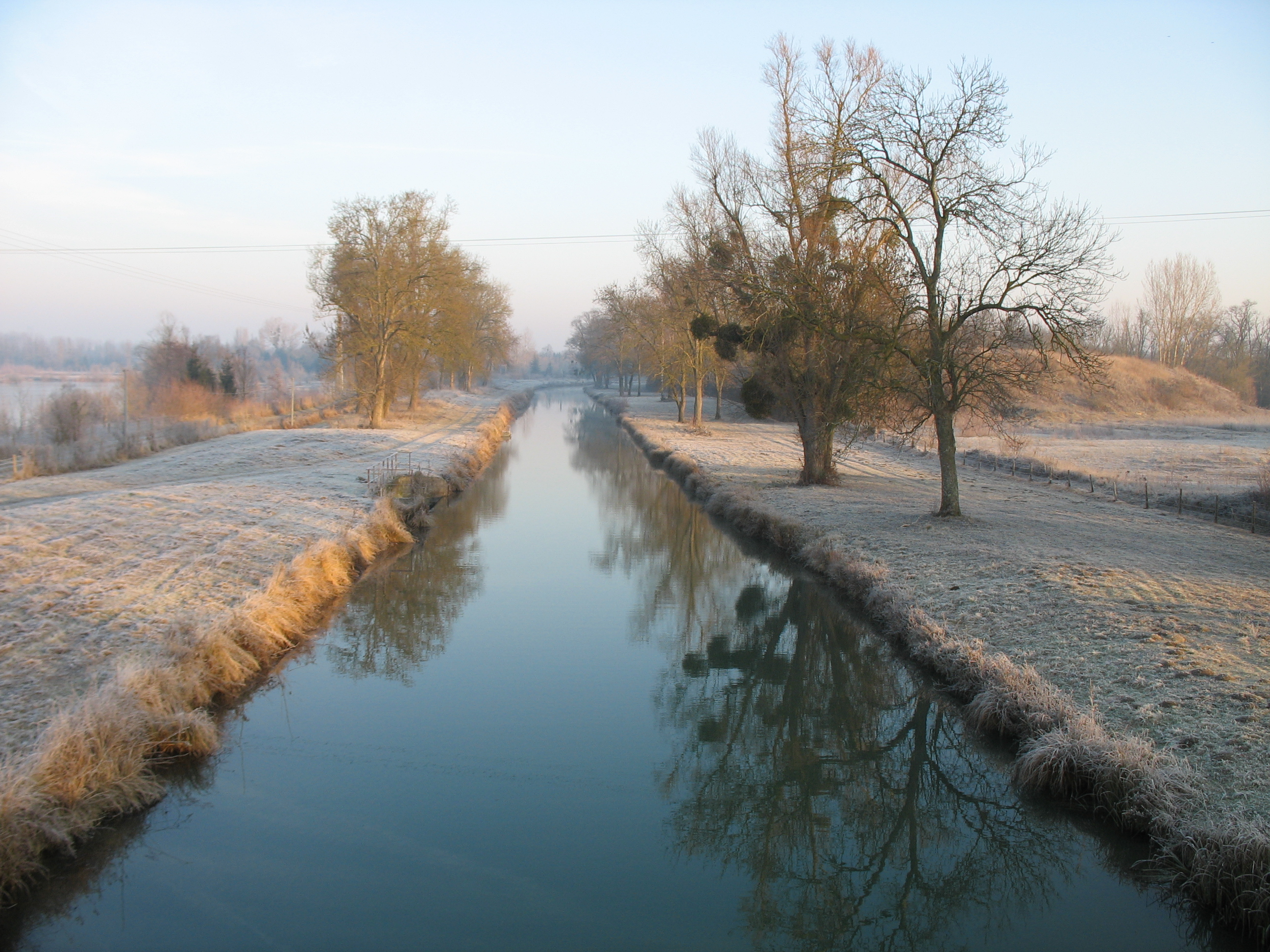
Wetlands of the Bassée.

As the title of a book by Pascal Popelin, former president of the institution, warns, "one day the water will come back". In the event of another major flood, millions of people in the Paris region would be directly affected. To help the lakes, which store up to 830 million m^{3} of water, the institution plans to create a fifth facility. Existing lakes can attenuate floods, but not eliminate them. This new development, known as "La Bassée", is intended to perfect the action of the four reservoir lakes. Located in the Seine-et-Marne region, this site covers 16,000 ha. It is one of the largest flood plains upstream of Paris. Under study since 2001, the project was presented in 2011 in the form of a public debate. It consists of redeveloping a plain upstream of Montereau-Fault-Yonne to temporarily store 55 million m^{3} of water pumped from the Seine (including 10 million m^{3} for the pilot reservoir) to reduce any exceptional flooding of the Yonne or Seine rivers. The project would cost 500 million euros. The estimated cost of the pilot reservoir alone represents more than three-quarters of the total 110 million euros of the flood prevention action plan.

Another project, the creation of a "Côtes de Champagne" lake, is currently under study. It would make it possible to control the Saulx watershed, upstream of Vitry-le-François. With a possible surface area of 2,300 ha and a capacity of around 130 million m^{3}, it would be built on the principle of other lakes: earthen dykes surrounding a body of water. However, this project does not appear to be a priority for the IIBRBS, which is giving priority to "La Bassée" project. A third study has been carried out by the institution for the possible construction of new lake reservoirs on certain tributaries of the Yonne.

== See also ==
- Water agency (France)

== Appendix ==
=== Bibliography ===
- Gilles-Antoine Langlois, Pannecière: Les lacs réservoirs du bassin de la Seine I, Somogy, March 2004, 126 p., paperback, 25 × 28 cm, (ISBN 2-85056-721-3)
- Gilles-Antoine Langlois, Le lac d'Orient: Les Lacs-réservoirs du bassin de la Seine II, Somogy, September 2004, 120 p., paperback, 25 × 28 cm, (ISBN 2-85056-778-7)
- Gilles-Antoine Langlois, Le lac du Der-Chantecoq: Les lacs réservoirs du Bassin de la Seine III, Somogy, January 2005, 128 p., paperback, 25 × 28 cm, (ISBN 2-85056-795-7)
- Gilles-Antoine Langlois, Le lac Amance, le lac du Temple: Les lacs-réservoirs du bassin de la Seine IV, Somogy, November 2005, 104 p., paperback, 25 × 28 cm, (ISBN 2-85056-868-6)
- Catherine and Bernard Desjeux, Seine de vies, Grandvaux, November 2015, 200 p., paperback, 20x25, (ISBN 978-2-909550-97-8)

=== External links ===
- Official website archive
- Authority records: VIAF BnF (data) IdRef WorldCat
- Frédéric Gache - The role of the Grands lacs de Seine in flood prevention in the Seine basin archive
