= Lac de Chaumeçon =

Reservoir in France

- Location within France
- Location: Nièvre
- Coordinates: 47°17′14″N 3°54′54″E
- Type: artificial
- Primary inflows: Chalaux, Porcmignon
- Primary outflows: Chalaux
- Basin countries: France
- Max. length: 4 km (2.5 mi)
- Max. width: 0.7 km (0.43 mi)
- Surface area: 1.35 km^{2} (0.52 sq mi)
- Water volume: 19,000,000 m^{3} (670,000,000 cu ft)
- Surface elevation: 400 m (1,300 ft)
- Islands: 1

Lac de Chaumeçon is a lake in Nièvre, France. The lake is situated at an elevation of 400 m, with a surface area of 1.35 km^{2}. The lake is adjacent to the nearby commune of Brassy, Nièvre.
