= Géraudot =

Commune in Grand Est, France

- Commune
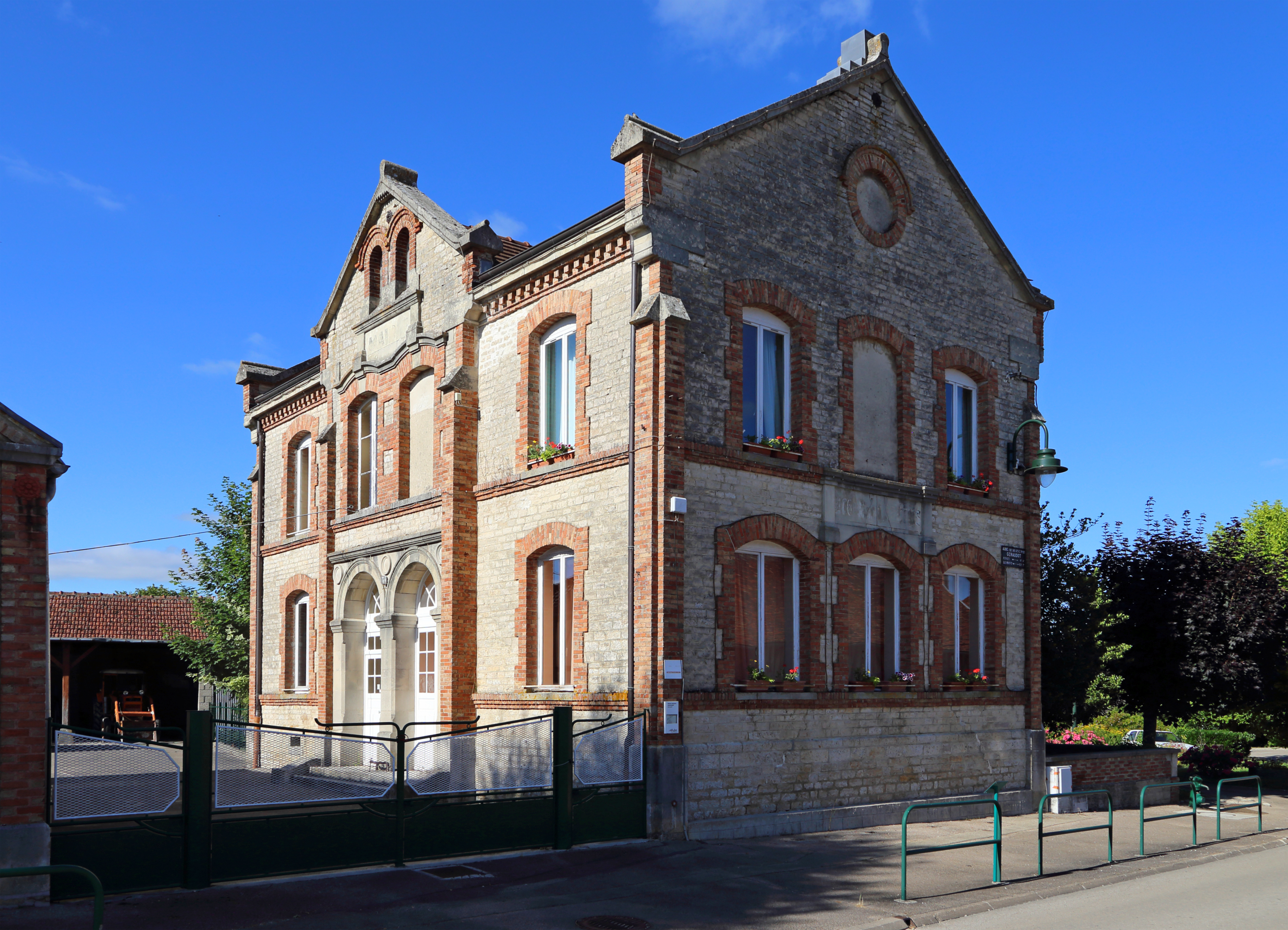
- The town hall in Géraudot

- Coat of arms
- Location of Géraudot
- Location within France Location within Grand Est
- Coordinates: 48°18′34″N 4°19′25″E
- Country: France
- Region: Grand Est
- Department: Aube
- Arrondissement: Troyes
- Canton: Brienne-le-Château
- Intercommunality: Forêts, lacs, terres en Champagne

Government
  - Mayor (2020–2026): Noémie Brague
- Area^{1}: 16.74 km^{2} (6.46 sq mi)
- Elevation: 146 m (479 ft)
- Population (2023): 339
  - Density: 20.3/km^{2} (52.4/sq mi)
- Time zone: UTC+01:00 (CET)
  - Summer (DST): UTC+02:00 (CEST)
- INSEE/Postal code: 10165 /10220
- ^{1} French Land Register data, which excludes lakes, ponds, glaciers > 1 km^{2} (0.386 sq mi or 247 acres) and river estuaries.

Géraudot (French pronunciation: [ʒeʁodo]) is a commune in the Aube department in north-central France.

== Population ==
Historical population
Year	Pop.	±% p.a.
1968	246	—
1975	239	−0.41%
1982	255	+0.93%
1990	274	+0.90%
1999	291	+0.67%
2007	290	−0.04%
2012	309	+1.28%
2017	337	+1.75%
2023	339	+0.10%
Source: INSEE

== See also ==
- Communes of the Aube department
- Parc naturel régional de la Forêt d'Orient
