= Lac de Pannecière =

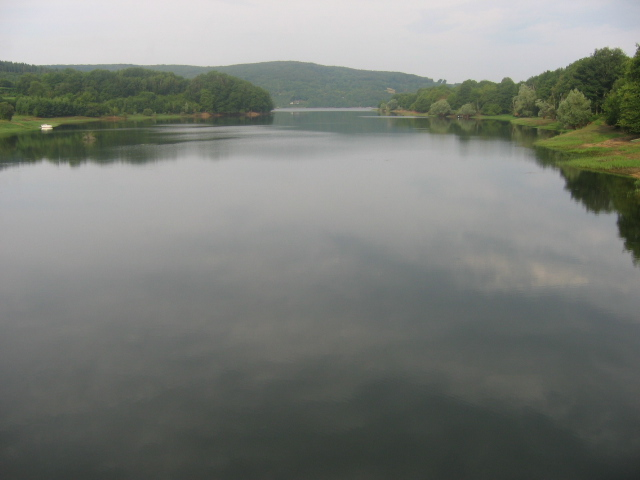

- Location within France
- Location: Nièvre
- Coordinates: 47°09′15″N 3°53′44″E
- Type: artificial
- Primary inflows: Yonne, Houssière, Ensein
- Primary outflows: Yonne River
- Basin countries: France
- Max. length: 7.2 km (4.5 mi)
- Max. width: 1 km (0.62 mi)
- Surface area: 5.2 km^{2} (2.0 sq mi)
- Max. depth: 48 m (157 ft)
- Water volume: 82,500,000 m^{3} (2.91×10^{9} cu ft)
- Residence time: 1 year
- Surface elevation: 320 m (1,050 ft)

Lac de Pannecière is a lake in the department Nièvre in France. At an elevation of 320 m, its surface area is 5.2 km^{2}. It manages a drainage basin of 220 km2. It is the largest of the Morvan lakes.

Its construction was planned following major floods of the Seine, namely that of 1910. The lake-reservoir was declared of public utility by a decree of the September 8, 1929. So, ut's considered to be part of the EPTB Seine Grands Lacs.

Work only actually began on September 29, 1937, but was interrupted at the start of WWII, before resuming in May 1946 and completed in December 1949. During periods of high activity, up to 550 workers worked on the site (they were housed in a newly constructed workers' town, as the area has low population and most workers came from afar, without housing). Its construction also included the creation of 16 km of roads and 6 bridges.

Two hamlets were engulfed during the impoundment of the reservoir: "Pelus" (entirely) and "Blaisy" (partially). Remains can still be seen during the annual partial emptying, or during the complete decennial emptying: piles of stone, the Yonne and the Houssière and the old stone bridges spanning them, the roads that crossed the hamlets, etc.

A hydroelectric plant managed by EDF was set up in 1950. This plant generates power from the waterfall created by the dam to produce electricity.

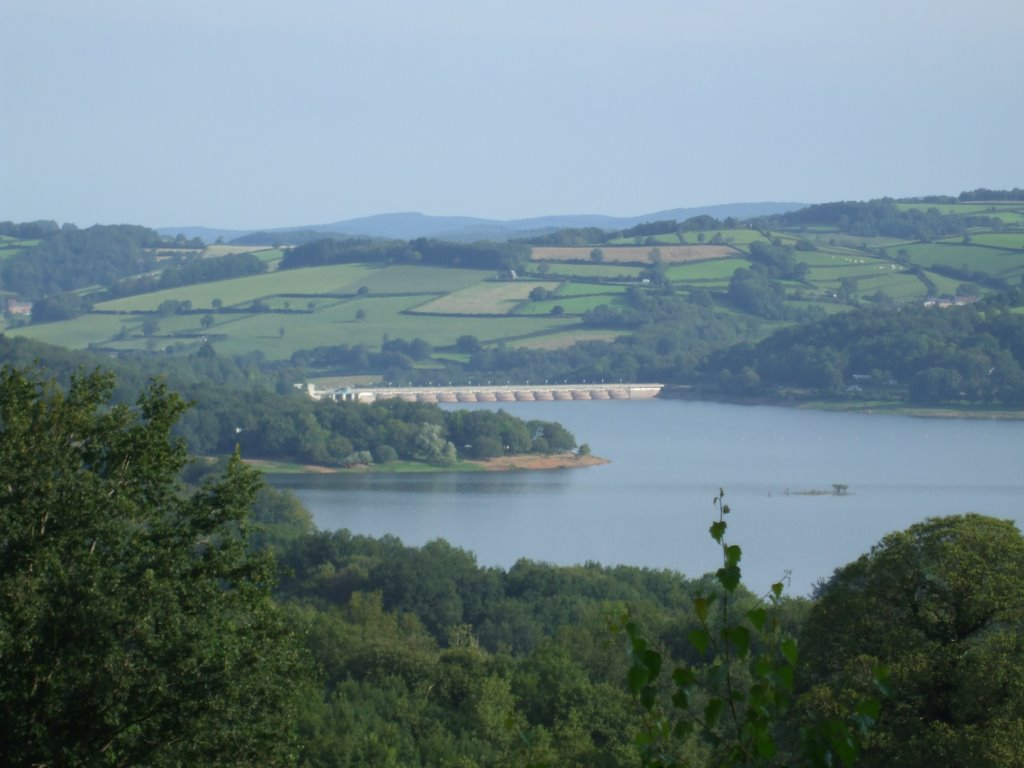
the "barrage de Pannecière"

map
