= Mesnil-Saint-Père =

Commune in Grand Est, France

- Commune
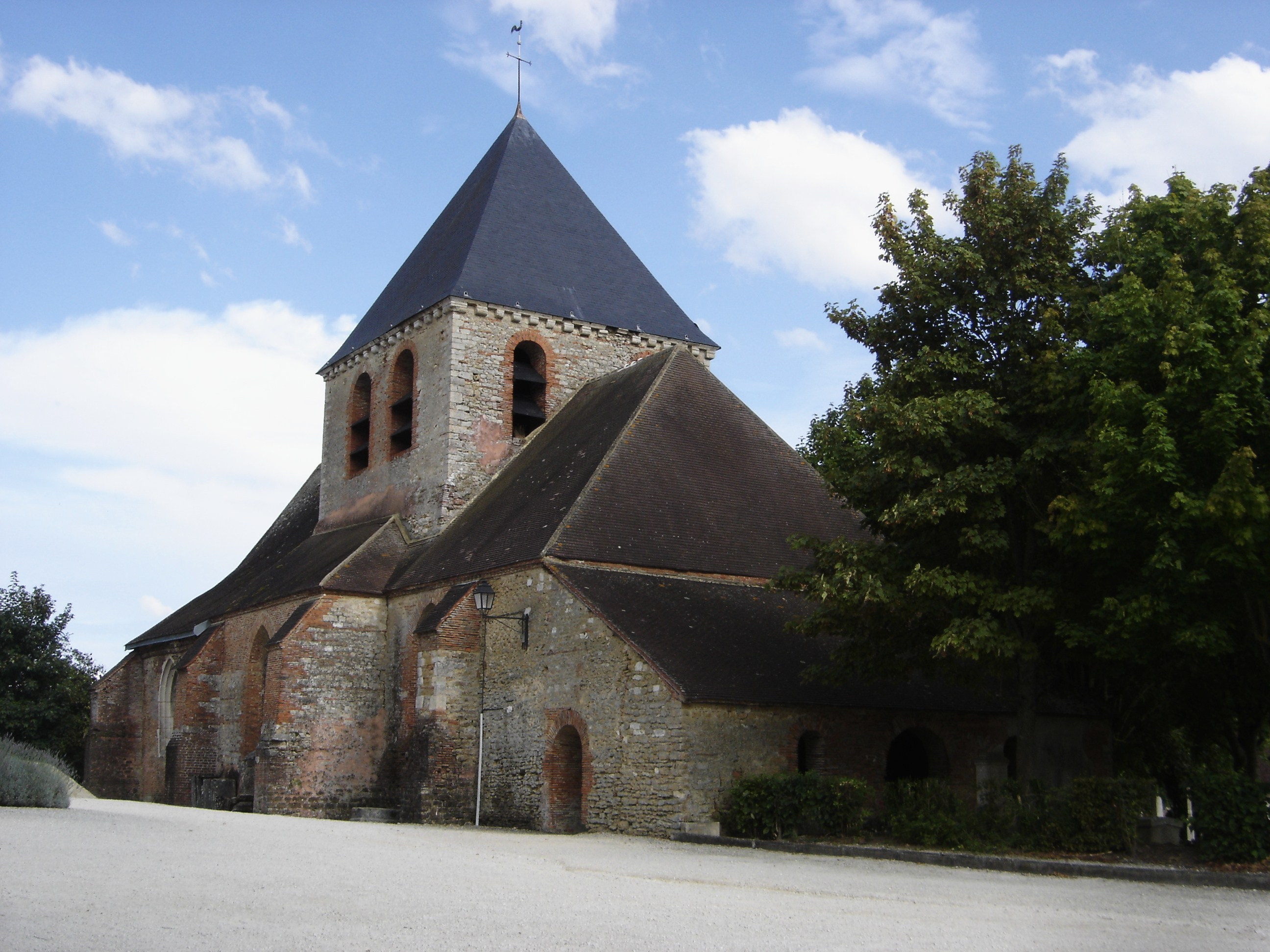
- The church in Mesnil-Saint-Père

- Coat of arms
- Location of Mesnil-Saint-Père
- Location within France Location within Grand Est
- Coordinates: 48°15′04″N 4°20′17″E
- Country: France
- Region: Grand Est
- Department: Aube
- Arrondissement: Troyes
- Canton: Vendeuvre-sur-Barse
- Intercommunality: CA Troyes Champagne Métropole

Government
  - Mayor (2020–2026): Pascal Henri
- Area^{1}: 17.45 km^{2} (6.74 sq mi)
- Elevation: 134 m (440 ft)
- Population (2023): 438
  - Density: 25.1/km^{2} (65.0/sq mi)
- Time zone: UTC+01:00 (CET)
  - Summer (DST): UTC+02:00 (CEST)
- INSEE/Postal code: 10238 /10140
- ^{1} French Land Register data, which excludes lakes, ponds, glaciers > 1 km^{2} (0.386 sq mi or 247 acres) and river estuaries.

Mesnil-Saint-Père (French pronunciation: [mɛnil sɛ̃ pɛʁ]) is a commune in the Aube department in north-central France.

== Population ==
Historical population
Year	Pop.	±% p.a.
1968	356	—
1975	364	+0.32%
1982	327	−1.52%
1990	287	−1.62%
1999	331	+1.60%
2007	385	+1.91%
2012	440	+2.71%
2017	496	+2.42%
2023	438	−2.05%
Source: INSEE

== See also ==
- Communes of the Aube department
- Parc naturel régional de la Forêt d'Orient
