= Chalaux =

- Commune
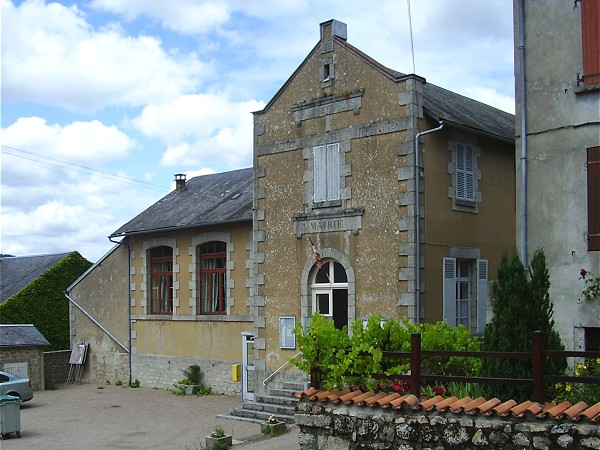
- The town hall in Chalaux
- Location of Chalaux
- Location within France Location within Bourgogne-Franche-Comté
- Coordinates: 47°20′23″N 3°54′45″E
- Country: France
- Region: Bourgogne-Franche-Comté
- Department: Nièvre
- Arrondissement: Château-Chinon (Ville)
- Canton: Corbigny

Government
  - Mayor (2020–2026): Patrice Grimardias
- Area^{1}: 10.19 km^{2} (3.93 sq mi)
- Highest elevation: 557 m (1,827 ft)
- Lowest elevation: 278 m (912 ft)
- Population (2023): 89
  - Density: 8.7/km^{2} (23/sq mi)
- Time zone: UTC+01:00 (CET)
  - Summer (DST): UTC+02:00 (CEST)
- INSEE/Postal code: 58049 /58140
- ^{1} French Land Register data, which excludes lakes, ponds, glaciers > 1 km^{2} (0.386 sq mi or 247 acres) and river estuaries.

Chalaux (French pronunciation: [ʃalo]) is a commune in the Nièvre department in central France.

== See also ==
- Communes of the Nièvre department
- Parc naturel régional du Morvan
