= Houssière =

River in Belgium

Coordinates: 50.6146°N 4.60812°E

The Houssière is a little river in the provinces of Namur and Walloon Brabant in Belgium, left tributary of the Orne (Scheldt basin). Its source lies between Gentinnes and Sombreffe. It traverses Villeroux and Hévillers, and flows into the Orne at Mont-Saint-Guibert.
