= Buchères =

Commune in Grand Est, France

- Commune
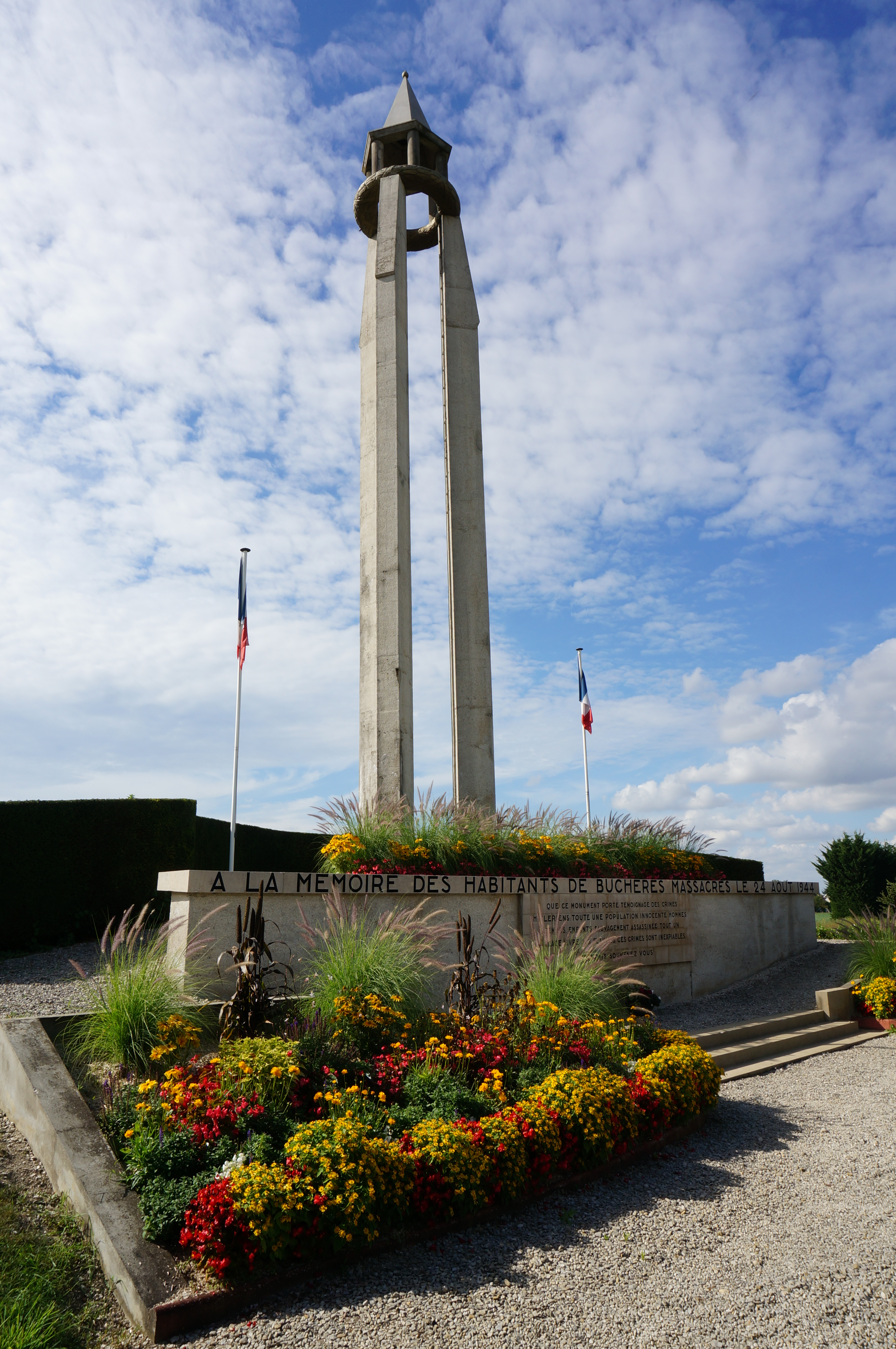
- Monument Buchères

- Coat of arms
- Location of Buchères
- Location within France Location within Grand Est
- Coordinates: 48°14′19″N 4°06′33″E
- Country: France
- Region: Grand Est
- Department: Aube
- Arrondissement: Troyes
- Canton: Vendeuvre-sur-Barse
- Intercommunality: CA Troyes Champagne Métropole

Government
  - Mayor (2020–2026): Philippe Gundall
- Area^{1}: 7.14 km^{2} (2.76 sq mi)
- Elevation: 118 m (387 ft)
- Highest elevation: 133 m (436 ft)
- Lowest elevation: 111 m (364 ft)
- Population (2023): 2,055
  - Density: 288/km^{2} (745/sq mi)
- Time zone: UTC+01:00 (CET)
  - Summer (DST): UTC+02:00 (CEST)
- INSEE/Postal code: 10067 /10800
- ^{1} French Land Register data, which excludes lakes, ponds, glaciers > 1 km^{2} (0.386 sq mi or 247 acres) and river estuaries.

Buchères (French pronunciation: [byʃɛʁ]) is a commune in the Aube department in north-central France.

== World War II ==
On 24 August 1944 men of the 51st SS-Brigade massacred 68 people, of whom ten were children under ten year old, five were elderly above seventy years, including 35 women and three infants of 18, 11 and 6 months.

== Population ==
Historical population
Year	Pop.	±% p.a.
1968	727	—
1975	1,072	+5.70%
1982	1,314	+2.95%
1990	1,328	+0.13%
1999	1,345	+0.14%
2007	1,403	+0.53%
2012	1,435	+0.45%
2017	1,688	+3.30%
2023	2,055	+3.33%
Source: INSEE

== See also ==
- Communes of the Aube department

== Bibliography ==
- Crimes allemands : Le Martyre de Buchères (Aube) : 24 août 1944, Troyes : Grande impr. de Troyes, 1945, 48 p., ill.
