= Arrentières =

Commune in Grand Est, France

- Commune
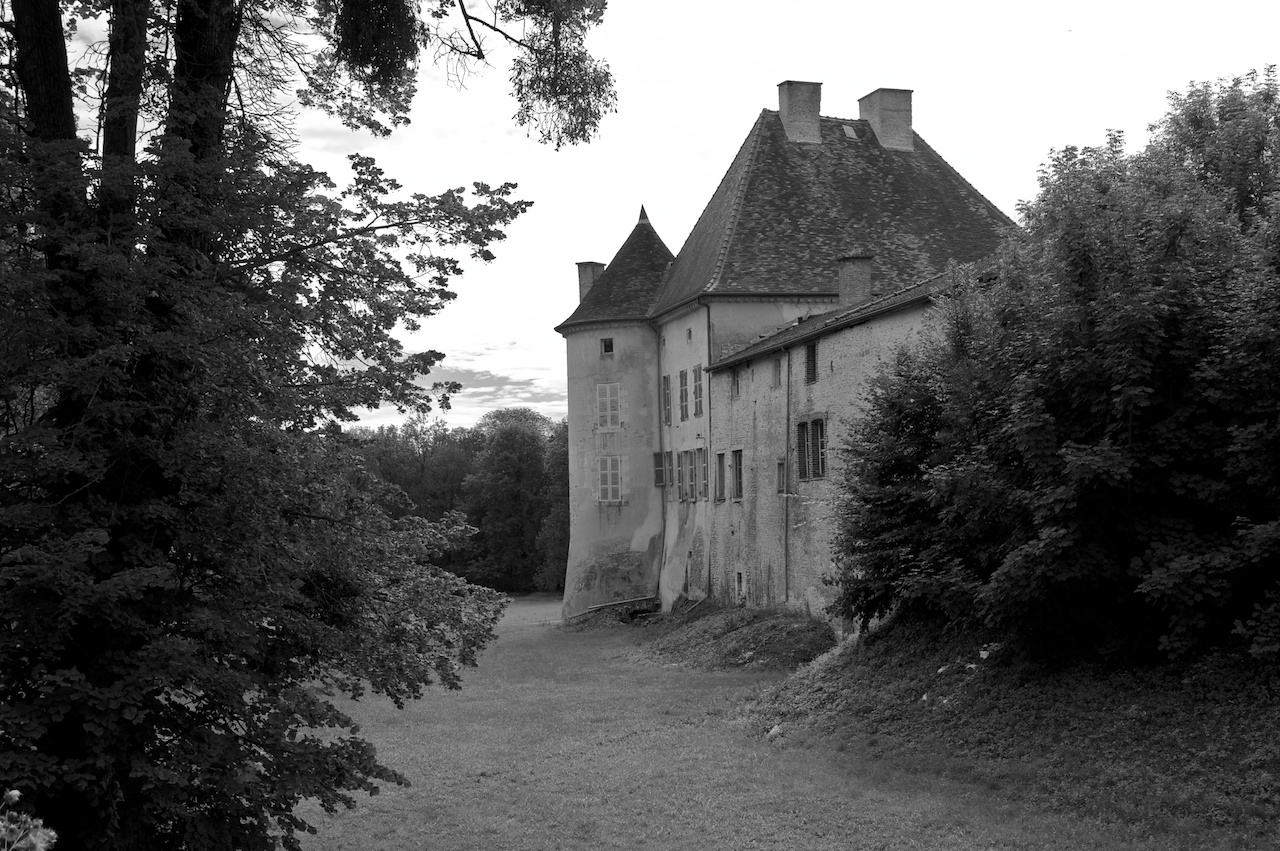
- Chateau

- Coat of arms
- Location of Arrentières
- Location within France Location within Grand Est
- Coordinates: 48°15′51″N 4°44′36″E
- Country: France
- Region: Grand Est
- Department: Aube
- Arrondissement: Bar-sur-Aube
- Canton: Bar-sur-Aube
- Intercommunality: Région de Bar-sur-Aube

Government
  - Mayor (2020–2026): Alain Mennetrier
- Area^{1}: 13.91 km^{2} (5.37 sq mi)
- Elevation: 216 m (709 ft)
- Population (2023): 176
  - Density: 12.7/km^{2} (32.8/sq mi)
- Time zone: UTC+01:00 (CET)
  - Summer (DST): UTC+02:00 (CEST)
- INSEE/Postal code: 10011 /10200
- ^{1} French Land Register data, which excludes lakes, ponds, glaciers > 1 km^{2} (0.386 sq mi or 247 acres) and river estuaries.

Arrentières (French pronunciation: [aʁɑ̃tjɛʁ]) is a commune in the Aube department in the Grand Est region of north-central France.

== Geography ==
Arrentières is located in the Côte des Bar between the communes of Montier-en-l'Isle and Engente. In a direct line the commune is 4.3 km north-east of Bar-sur-Aube, 33.9 km north-west of Chaumont and 49.3 km east of Troyes. The nearest large cities are Reims (123 km) and Dijon (107 km). Access to the commune is by the D384 road from Bar-sur-Aube in the south passing north through the western part of the commune west of the village and continuing to Soulaines-Dhuys in the north. The D13 also goes from Bar-sur-Aube through the south-east of the commune and continues north-east to Colombé-la-Fosse. Access to the village is by the D73 which branches off the D384 north of Bar-sur-Aube and passes through the village before continuing north-east to Beurville. The D102 branches off the D384 in the north of the commune and goes south-east through the village and continues to Voigny in the south-east. The commune has large areas of forest in the north with the southern part mostly farmland.

The commune lies on a limestone plateau with an area of 1,391 hectares and its altitude varying between 183m in the valley to 331m near the Vernonfays farm in the north.

The Vernet river flows from the north of the commune to join the Ruisseau de Cuvelots south of the village which then flows south to join the Bresse in the south-west. The Bresse flows from the east passing through the south of the commune and continuing west to join the Aube near Ailleville.

== Toponymy ==
The following names have been attested:

- Arrentières (or Arenterium/Arenthières) (1147)
- Arentières (1793)
- Arentière (1801)

It comes from a dialectal adjective arremier meaning "who owes money, who pays money".

== History ==
The Orimont farm, located in the south-east of the commune was mentioned in 1148.

In the 12th century the lords of the village were the Commanderie de Thors whose origin dated back to the Knights Templar. During this same period, there was a priory at Arrentières of the Cistercian order. It was transferred to Chaumont during the late 17th century.

In the 14th century Jean d'Arrentières was appointed royal bailiff and served the Count of Bar. In 1371 he arrested Countess Yolande de Bar by order of Charles V and held her captive.

=== Heraldry ===
Arms of Arrentières	Blazon: Party per bend, at 1 Argent, a vine branch Vert leaved of one and fructed of one in Gules; at 2 Azure a wheat garb of Or; in chief Vert charged with a demi-vol of Or flanked by two towers of Argent, port open, turreted and masoned in Sable.

== Policy and administration ==
=== Political trends and results ===
In the second round of the 2002 French presidential election, 76.32% of the votes were cast for Jacques Chirac (RPR) and 23.68% for Jean-Marie Le Pen (FN).

In the second round of the 2007 French presidential election, 81.18% of the votes were cast for Nicolas Sarkozy (UMP) and 18.82% for Ségolène Royal (PS) with a participation rate of 86.63%.

In the second round of the 2012 French presidential election, 78.57% of the votes were cast for Nicolas Sarkozy (UMP) and 21.43% for François Hollande (PS), with a participation rate of 93.90%.

=== Municipal administration ===
As the number of inhabitants of the town is between 100 and 500, the number of council members is 11.

== Administration ==
List of Successive Mayors

From	To	Name	Party	Position
/1857		Louis Ladislas de Lassus		
2001		Alain Mennetrier		LR
2014	2020	Pierre Vieville		
2020	2026	Didier Laporte		
15 March 2026		Alain Mennetrier		LR

=== Judicial and administrative proceedings ===
Arrentières reports to the Tribunal d'instance of Troyes, the Tribunal de grande instance of Troyes, the Court of Appeal of Reims, the juvenile court of Troyes, the industrial tribunal of Troyes, the Commercial Court of Troyes, the Administrative Court of Châlons-en-Champagne and the Administrative Court of Appeal of Nancy.

=== Environmental policy ===
Collection, recovery, and disposal of waste services are provided by the Community of communes of the Region of Bar-sur-Aube.

=== Local finance ===
From 2008 to 2013, the municipal administration has kept the net cash flow of capital repayments of loans at a better rate per capita than other communes of the same type:

Net Cash Flow from Operations per capita and per year.
Year	Arrentières	Average for this Stratum (Note: For this commune, the stratum is those communes with less than 250 inhabitants belonging to a fiscal group.)
2008	€202	€156
2009	€350	€150
2010	€174	€143
2011	€220	€179
2012	€174	€189

== Population ==
Historical population
Year	Pop.	±% p.a.
1968	235	—
1975	241	+0.36%
1982	245	+0.24%
1990	244	−0.05%
1999	231	−0.61%
2007	208	−1.30%
2012	228	+1.85%
2017	214	−1.26%
2023	176	−3.21%
Source: INSEE

== Town planning ==
=== Housing ===
In 2017 the total number of dwellings in the commune was 135. Among these units 72.6% were primary residences, second homes 5.9% and 21.5% of vacant housing. These units were all single-family houses. The proportion of primary homes, properties of their occupants, was 88.8%.

=== Development projects ===
Development projects are administered by the Community of communes of the Region of Bar-sur-Aube. All 27 communes in the area collaborate to implement joint project development and spatial planning for each town and village.

Arrentières was the first commune to have installed coloured candelabras (red) in the streets and, in 1995, one of the first small communes to be equipped with a sewerage treatment plant. An innovative collective project to heat all homes with wood has been designed but not implemented due to lack of funding. After the rehabilitation of roads, public lighting, water system and the church (Retable over the nave refurbished) over 3 years to 2010, the commune started the renovation of the hall as well as the walls of two lavoirs (public laundries).

== Economy ==
In 2009, the active population aged 15–64 years was 96 people of which there were 4 unemployed. These workers are in majority employees (78%), and are in majority employed outside the commune (70%).

On 31 December 2015 Arrentières had 53 establishments: 40 in agriculture-forestry-fishing, two in industry, none in construction, 8 in various trade-transport-services, and 3 related to the administrative sector.

Although the commune has only 214 inhabitants (2017), there are no fewer than eight producers of champagne: the commune has 130 hectares in the Champagne AOC.

== Sites and monuments ==
The Château d'Arrentières was built in the 13th century. The lodging and the towers were largely rebuilt in the late Middle Ages. Part of the building (Note: The moat, the curtain walls, the underground rooms next to the south wall, the tower-attic, the façades, and the roofs of the main lodging and the tower are classed as historical monuments.) has been registered as a historical monument since 20 May 1994.

The Church of Saint Jacques contains many items listed on the inventory of historical monuments:

- A Statue: Virgin and Child (16th century)
- A Statuette: St. Jacques (18th century)
- A Statue: Virgin and Child (18th century)
- A Statuette: Saint Jacques (18th century)
- An Altar cross (18th century)
- Statue: Saint Roch (disappeared) (18th century)
- A Retable, Tabernacle, and main altar step (18th century)
- A Statue: holy bishop (16th century)
- Tombstone of Jean de La Barre (16th century)
- Tombstone of Hugues Gradey (16th century)
- A Paten (19th century)
- A Chalice (19th century)
- An Eagle Lectern (17th century)
- A Statue: Christ on the Cross (17th century)
- A Painting: Martyrdom of Saint Sebastian (19th century)
- A Chair (19th century)
- An Altar Painting: Institution of the Rosary (19th century)
- A Painting: Saint Antoine (19th century)
- A Small bell (17th century)
- A Processional Staff: Assumption (18th century)
- Processional Staff: Saint Jacques (18th century)
- Processional Staff: Saint Roch (disappeared) (18th century)
- Tombstone of Jean de Rosières (16th century)
- Processional Staff: Saint Nicolas (19th century)
- The Furniture in the Church

== Facilities ==
=== Education ===
Arrentières is located in the area of the Academy of Reims.

The commune administered an elementary school (cycle 1) with a class of 17 students in 2012–2013. This class was closed before the 2013–2014 school year and the commune integrated into an inter-communal educational regrouping (RPI) - the Syndicat Mixte Bresse Œillet.

The closest kindergarten is located at Colombé-la-Fosse and, since the 2013–2014 school year and within the cluster, the elementary school is located at Colombé-le-Sec. For secondary education students go to the Gaston Bachelard esatte at Bar-sur-Aube.

The difficulties of organizing classes in the inter-communal educational grouping were covered in the daily L'Est-Éclair in early 2014.

=== Cultural events and festivities ===
The "Route of champagne in celebration" is a major event that lasts two days. It took place in 2009 at Arrentières.

=== Health ===
There is no doctor or nurse working in Arrentières. The nearest doctor and hospital are in Bar-sur-Aube.

=== Sports ===
The commune has a football field. On 1 May 2013, for the second year, the cycling Star Baralbine organized a cycle race called Prize of Arrentières.

=== Media ===
The regional daily L'Est-Éclair provides local information on the commune.

The commune has no Main distribution frame for ADSL installed nor is it connected to a fibre optic network. Telephone lines are connected to exchanges located in Bar-sur-Aube and Ville-sur-Terre.

=== Worship ===
Only Catholic worship is celebrated in Arrentières. The commune is one of eleven grouped in the Parish of Bar-sur-Aube, one of the nine parishes of pastoral area of Côtes des Bar in the Diocese of Troyes. The place of worship is the parish church of Saint-Jacques-le-Majeur.

This church has three naves dedicated to Saint Jacques-le-Majeur which date from the 18th century. Its bell tower is inspired by that of the Church of Saint-Pierre of Bar-sur-Aube.

== See also ==
- Communes of the Aube department
