= Bar-sur-Aube =

Subprefecture and commune in Grand Est, France

- Subprefecture and commune
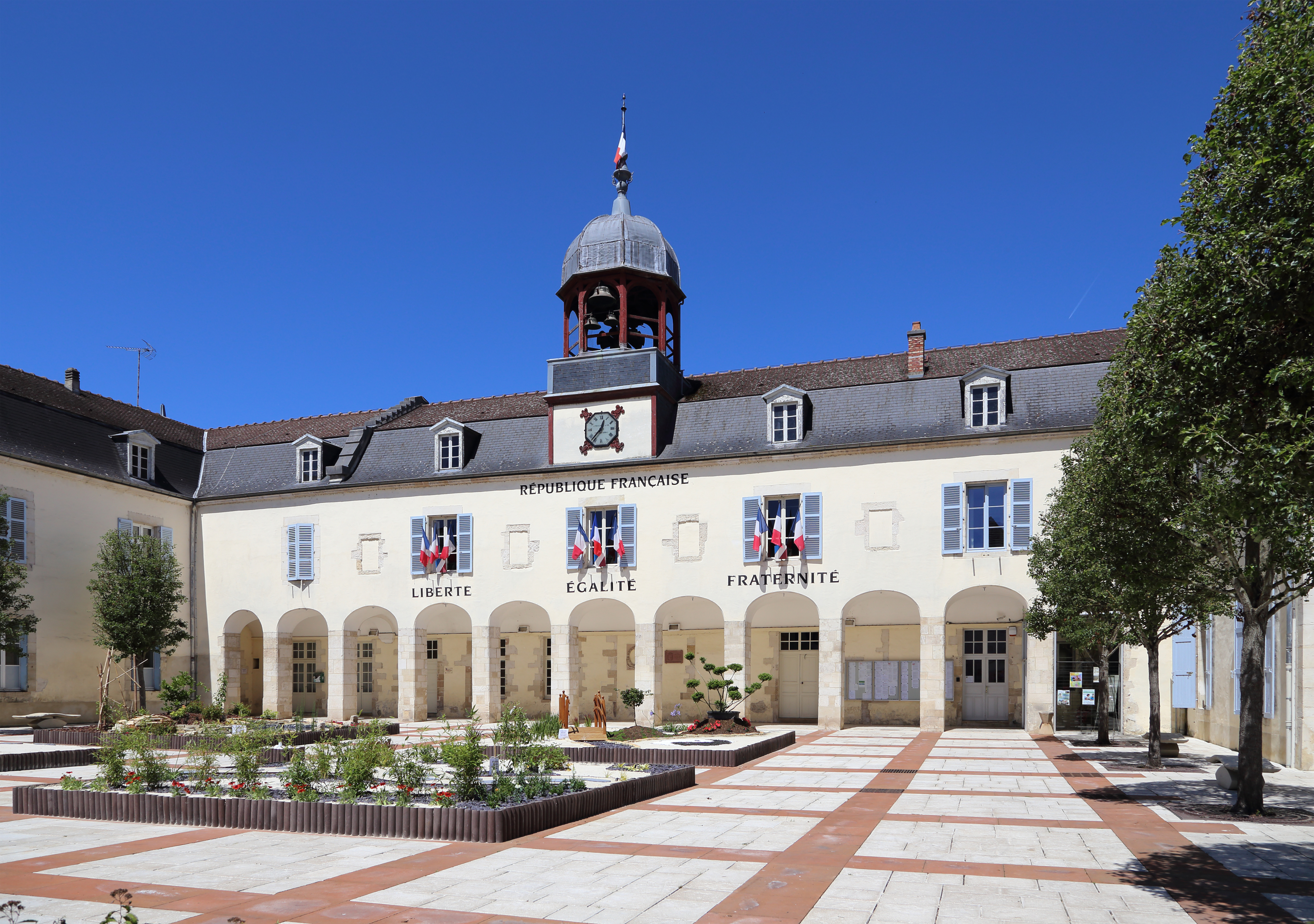
- Town hall of Bar-sur-Aube

- Coat of arms
- Location of Bar-sur-Aube
- Location within France Location within Grand Est
- Coordinates: 48°16′N 4°43′E
- Country: France
- Region: Grand Est
- Department: Aube
- Arrondissement: Bar-sur-Aube
- Canton: Bar-sur-Aube
- Intercommunality: Région de Bar sur Aube

Government
  - Mayor (2020–2026): Philippe Borde
- Area^{1}: 16.27 km^{2} (6.28 sq mi)
- Elevation: 166 m (545 ft)
- Highest elevation: 348 m (1,142 ft)
- Lowest elevation: 156 m (512 ft)
- Population (2023): 4,665
  - Density: 286.7/km^{2} (742.6/sq mi)
- Time zone: UTC+01:00 (CET)
  - Summer (DST): UTC+02:00 (CEST)
- INSEE/Postal code: 10033 /10200
- ^{1} French Land Register data, which excludes lakes, ponds, glaciers > 1 km^{2} (0.386 sq mi or 247 acres) and river estuaries.

Bar-sur-Aube (French: [baʁ syʁ ob], literally Bar on Aube) is a commune and a sub-prefecture in the Aube department in the Grand Est region of France.

Surrounded by hills and Champagne vineyards, the city is traversed by the river Aube, from which it derives its name.

The inhabitants of the commune are known as Baralbins or Baralbines and Barsuraubois or Barsurauboises.

The commune has been awarded three flowers by the National Council of Towns and Villages in Bloom in the Competition of cities and villages in Bloom.

== Geography ==
Bar-sur-Aube is located some 30 km west by north-west of Chaumont and 25 km south-east of Brienne-le-Château. Access to the commune is by the D619 road from Ailleville in the north-west which passes through the centre of the commune and the town before continuing east to Lignol-le-Château. The D396 branches off the D619 south-east of the town and goes south to Juvancourt. The D4 goes south-west from the town to Couvignon. The D13 comes from Fontaine in the south and passes through the town before continuing north-east to Colombé-la-Fosse. The D384 goes north to Ville-sur-Terre while the D73 branches off it in the town and goes to Arrentières. in the north. The TER Grand Est Troyes to Chalindrey railway passes through the commune coming from Vendeuvre-sur-Barse to the west to Bricon in the south-east with a station in the town. With a substantial urban area in the west and some forest in the south the commune is mostly farmland.

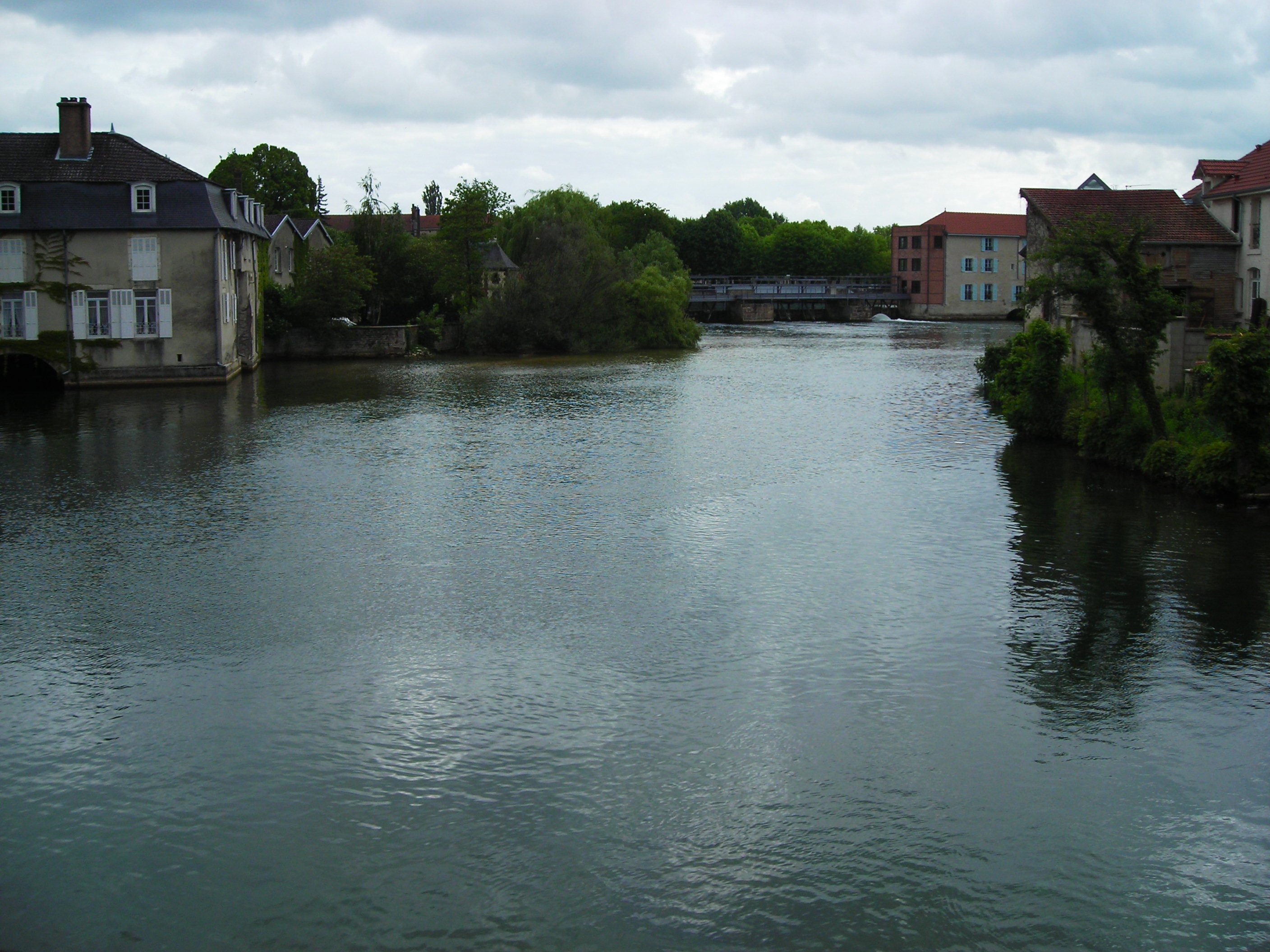
The Aube river at Bar-sur-Aube

The Aube river flows through the commune and the town from south-east to north-west continuing to eventually join the Seine at Marcilly-sur-Seine. The Bresse also flows through the commune coming from the north-east and forming a small part of the northern border before joining the Aube at the north-western tip of the commune.

== Toponymy ==
The area was attested in the form castro barro in the 7th century and Barri villa in 932.

Bar comes from a Gallic word meaning "summit" and is perhaps even older (pre-Gallic).

Bar-sur-Aube appears as Bar sur Aube on the 1750 Cassini Map and the same on the 1790 version.

== History ==
=== Ancient times ===
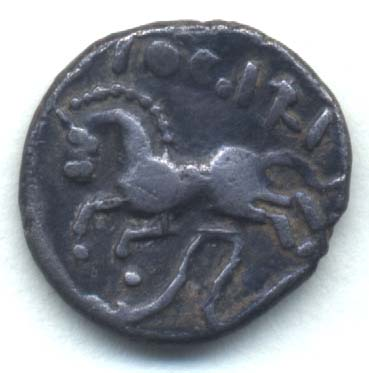
Togarix coin - Front

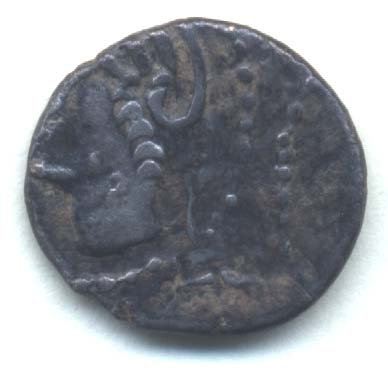
A Togarix coin - back

The existence of Bar-sur-Aube goes back to ancient times. There are remains of an oppidum from the Iron Age. A coin with the image of a horse in the name of Togirix (Chief of the Lingones) was discovered on the Sainte Germaine hill.

In Roman times the town appeared on the Tabula Peutingeriana under the name of Segessera. Some remains from the 1st to the 4th century including villas have been discovered in the town and surrounding areas. Segessera seemed to have existed from the Roman period to the first Lyonnais in the territory of the Lingones.

The city was devastated by Attila. After the division of the kingdom of Clovis by his son the town became part of Austrasia.

=== Middle Ages ===
Under Charles the Bald several varieties of coins were issued with the name of the city on the reverse. During the period of the Counts of Champagne the town was of great importance with the Champagne fairs where merchants from Flanders and Italy traded Oriental spices and silk for textiles and raw materials from the north of Europe in mid-February and mid-April. The town was then joined to the crown of France. In 1318 Philip V the Tall sold the town to Jacques de Croÿ, residents bought it themselves to ensure that the king could no longer sell or alienate the lands.

=== Modern and contemporary eras ===
When Charles V besieged Saint-Dizier the inhabitants of nearby villages came under his protection. The town suffered a long plague in 1636 which led to the end of the fair. In 1862 the fortifications were demolished and the boulevard du tour put in their place.

The French Revolution was well received in the commune and the convents disappeared. It became the chief town of the district from 1790 to 1800.

The city and surrounding area was the scene of the Battle of Bar-sur-Aube towards the end of the Napoleonic era on 27 February 1814.

In 1911 the Champagne riots of the Aube winegrowers and the Marnais traders to keep the vineyards in the Appellation d'origine contrôlée of "Champagne".

=== Heraldry ===
Arms of Bar-sur-Aube	Blazon: Parti per pale, at 1 Gules, a barbel Argent; at 2 Azure, a bend argent potent counter potent Or; in chief Azure chrged with 3 bees flying of Or.

== Administration ==
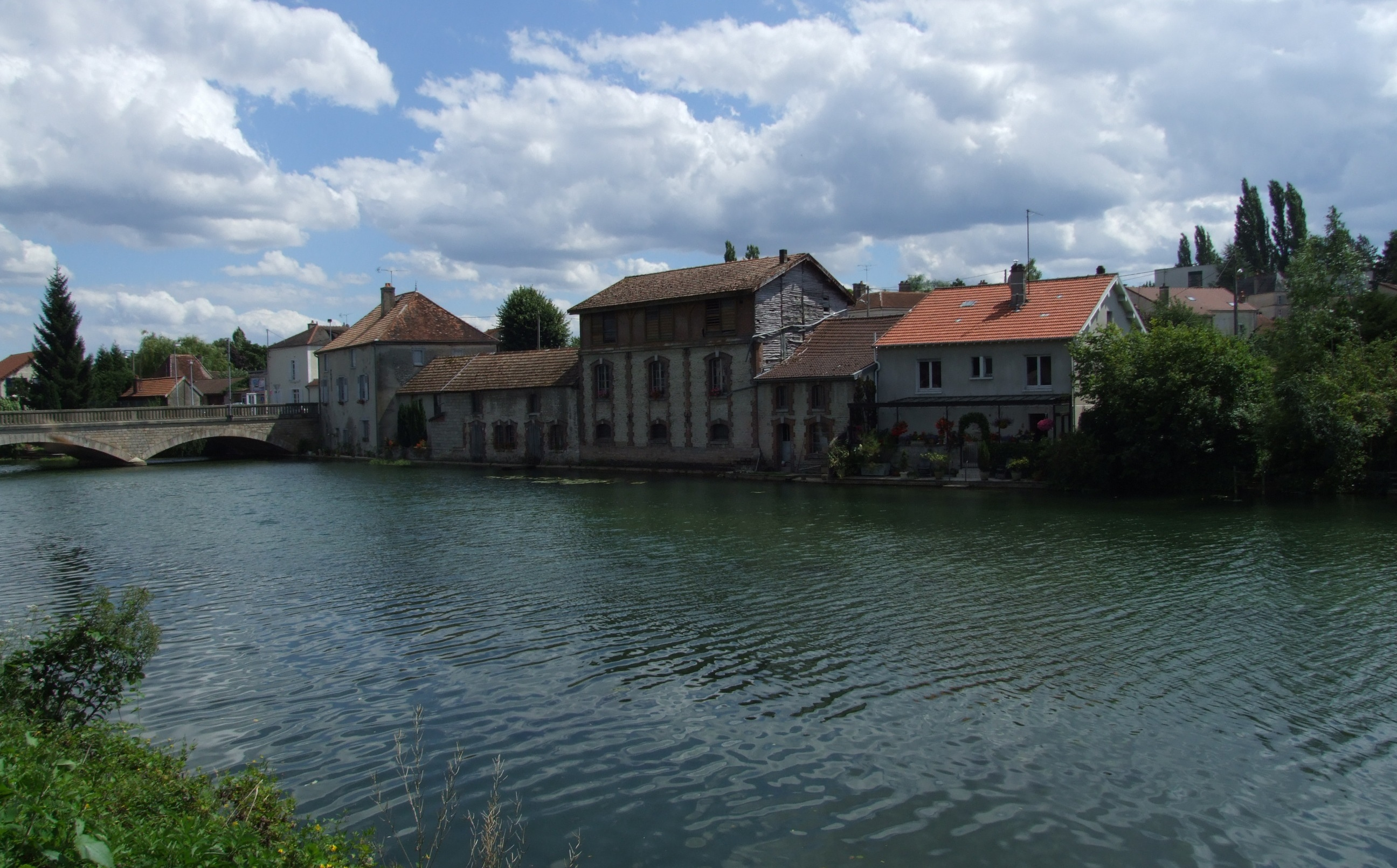
The Aube river bank

List of Successive Mayors

From	To	Name	Party	Position
1789		Claude-Laurent Bourgeois de Jessaint		
	1857	Vernand		
	1943	Arthur Bureau		
1943	1947	Léon Chevillotte		
1947	1959	Maurice Véchin		
1959	1964	Henry Supper		Printer
1964	1965	Roger Rubaud (interim)		Retired
1965	1971	Claude Pertat		Commercial agent
1971	2001	Jean-Pierre Davot		Trader
2001	2008	Jean-François Leroux		
2008	2014	René Gaudot	PRG	
2014	2026	Philippe Borde	UMP	

=== Twinning ===
Bar-sur-Aube has twinning associations with:

- Gernsheim (Germany) since 1976.

== Demography ==
Historical population

Year	Pop.	±% p.a.
1793	3,652	—
1800	3,665	+0.05%
1806	3,707	+0.19%
1821	3,503	−0.38%
1831	3,890	+1.05%
1836	3,940	+0.26%
1841	4,169	+1.14%
1846	4,163	−0.03%
1851	4,442	+1.31%
1856	4,781	+1.48%
1861	4,727	−0.23%
1866	4,809	+0.34%
1872	4,453	−1.27%
1876	4,521	+0.38%
1881	4,579	+0.26%
1886	4,636	+0.25%
1891	4,342	−1.30%
1896	4,548	+0.93%
1901	4,587	+0.17%

Year	Pop.	±% p.a.
1906	4,507	−0.35%
1911	4,533	+0.12%
1921	4,074	−1.06%
1926	4,313	+1.15%
1931	4,264	−0.23%
1936	4,002	−1.26%
1946	3,921	−0.20%
1954	4,387	+1.41%
1962	4,801	+1.13%
1968	6,008	+3.81%
1975	7,265	+2.75%
1982	6,943	−0.65%
1990	6,707	−0.43%
1999	6,261	−0.76%
2007	5,461	−1.69%
2012	5,145	−1.19%
2017	4,902	−0.96%
2023	4,665	−0.82%

Source: EHESS and INSEE

=== Education ===
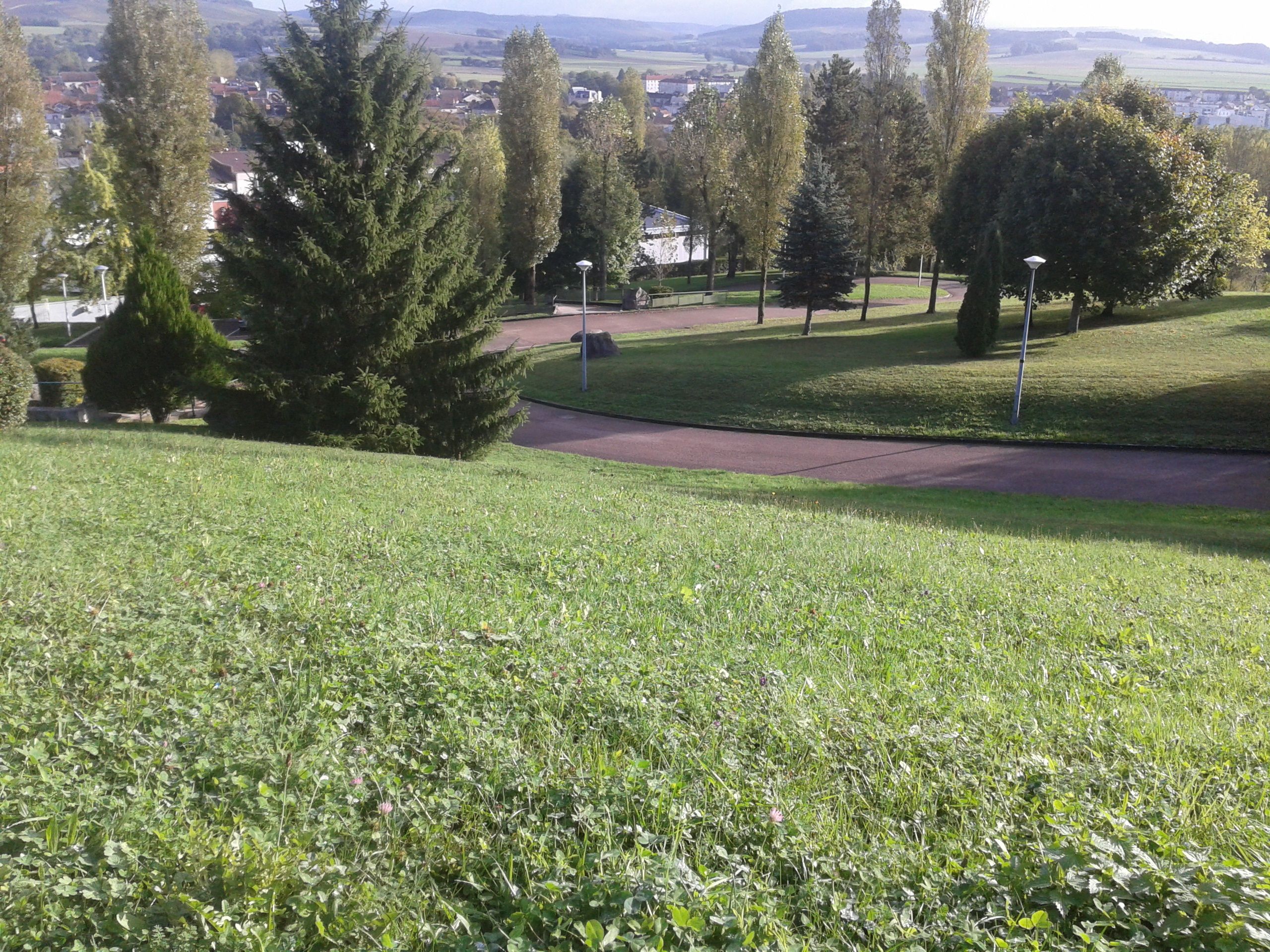
View from Lycée Gaston Bachelard.

The commune has several schools and colleges:

- One public Kindergarten: Gambetta
- 3 Elementary schools:
  - Saint Teresa
  - Arthur Bureau Public school
  - Maurice Vechin public school
- One college: the College Gaston Bachelard The college consists of 19 classes spread over 4 floors offering students with options for Latin in the 5th year, Greek in the 3rd year and has the distinction of being the only college in France to have a cinema-audiovisual option. A soccer section is available for middle school and high school students.
- One comprehensive school: Lycée Polyvalent Gaston Bachelard This general and technological school consists of 14 classes spread over 3 levels and offers its students the following courses: S (Scientific), L (literary), ES (economic and social) and STMG (Science and Technology manageant and management). It also offers a cinema-audiovisual option from the 2nd year. Foreign languages ??taught are German, English and Spanish. Classes are held in groups of skills not whole classes. Each year school trips are organized to Germany, Scotland, and Spain. In 2013 an exchange with students from Ashburn (United States) began. The French students went in February and US students came in 2014. The vocational high school consists of 6 classes spread over 3 floors and offers its students courses in trade and electrical engineering.

=== Sports ===
There are numerous sports clubs in Bar-sur-Aube:

Sports Clubs in 2014

Activity	Club
Billiards	Billiard Club Baralbin
Diving	Club Nautique Baralbin
Cycling	Cyclo Club Baralbin, Étoile Cycliste Baralbine
Football	BFC vétéran, OS Luisadas, Bar Football Club
Gym	Gymnastic Volontaire Bar. Gym des Nin's, Jeune Garde de Bar-sur-Aube, La Concorde
Hang-gliding / Para-gliding	Les Ailes de Sainte-Germaine
Table tennis, roller blades, canoe, kayaking	Maison pour Tous
Pétanque	Pétanque baralbine
Basketball	PL Basket
Multi-sports	Patronage laïque
Rhythmic Gym	G.I.R.L.S.
Badminton	Badminton Club Baralbin
Aikido	Bar-sur-Aube Aïkido
Athletics	Cercle Athlétique Bar-Bayel
Fencing	Cercle d'Escrime Baralbin
Archery and Shooting	Diana Sport
Judo	Judo Club Baralbin
Thai Boxing	Muay thai pahuyouth
Handball	PL Handball
Mountain Climbing	Roc Altitude
Karate	Shotokan Karaté Do
Swimming	Stade Nautique Baralbin
Tennis	Tennis Club Baralbin

== Economy ==
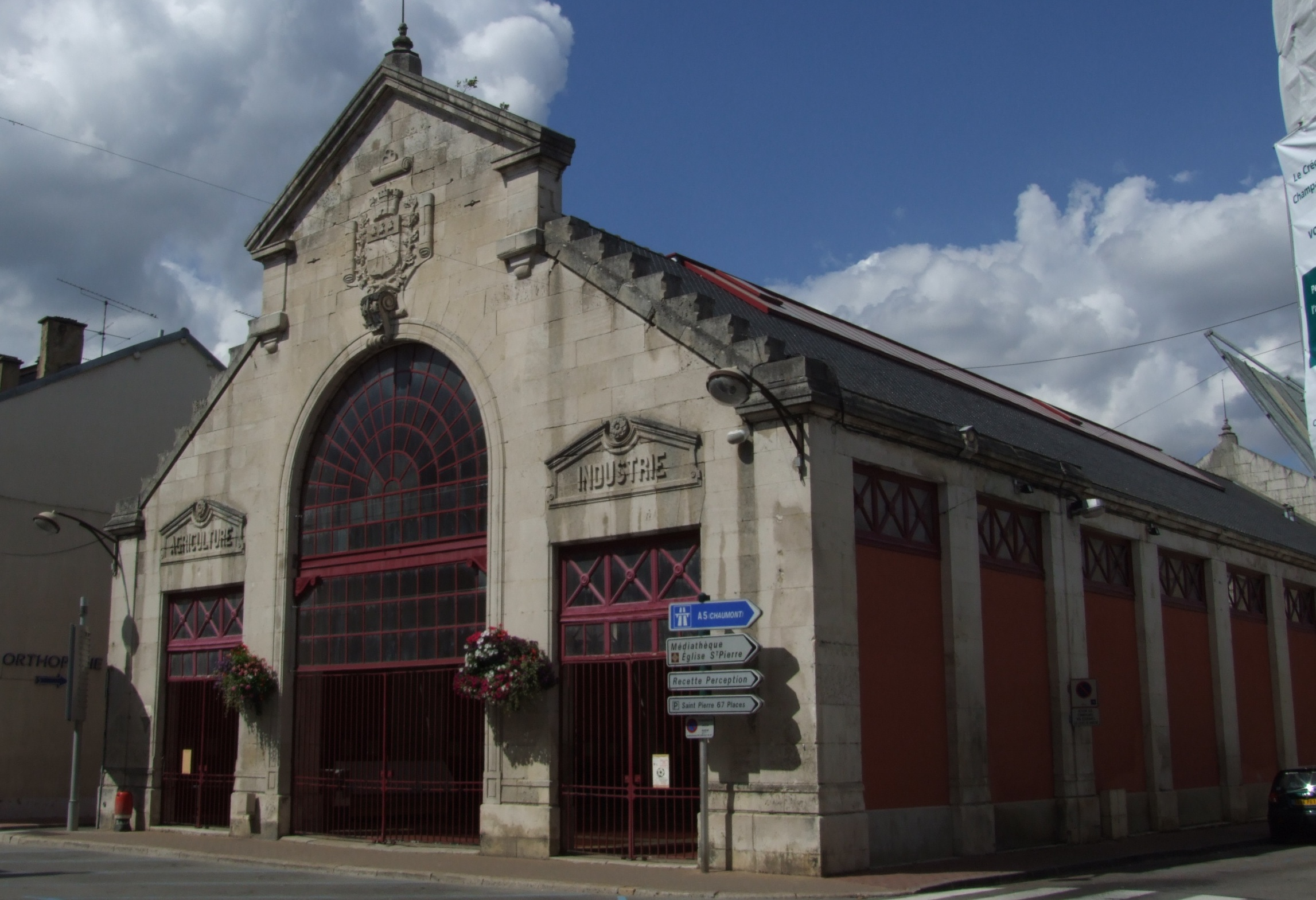
The Covered Market

The commune has a branch of the Chamber of Commerce and Industry of Troyes and Aube.

=== Industry ===
- The hemp industry is highly developed in Bar-sur-Aube and has been growing steadily for several years.
- Furniture Manufacturing: Dumeste (Cauval Industries Group)
- Metal processing (forging, machining) for aerospace, armaments, agricultural machinery, medicine (prosthetics), etc. Manoir Aerospace.

=== Agriculture ===
Bar-sur-Aube, is the largest French producer of straw hemp (125 tons per day) and many hemp products are manufactured in the commune. Around the town there are many vineyards specializing in champagne.

== Culture and heritage ==
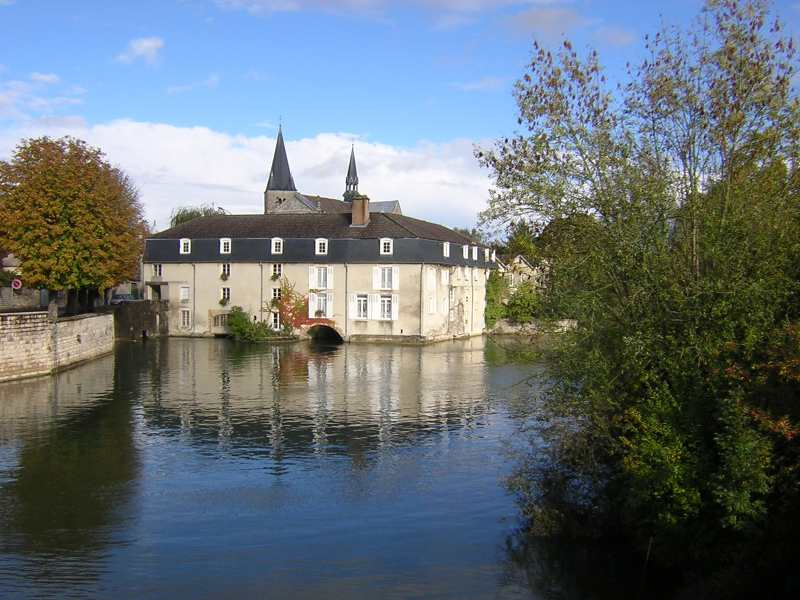
Marcasselles Mill and the bell towers of the Church of Saint-Maclou

Guided tours of the town are organised on request by the Office of Tourism.

The commune contains over 200 objects that are registered as historical objects - mainly in the Church of Saint Peter but many others in different locations.

=== Civil heritage ===
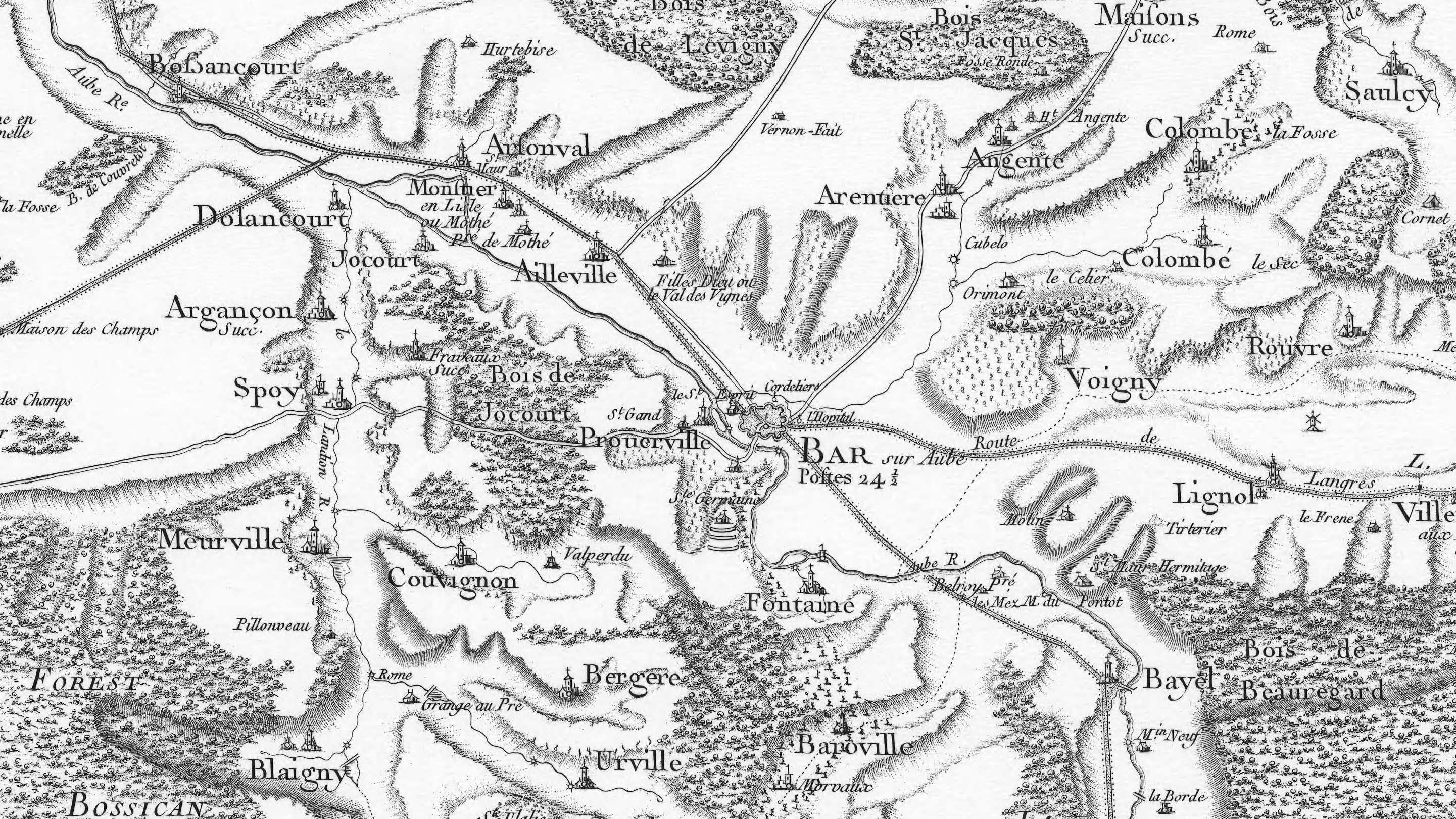
Old map of places in the town

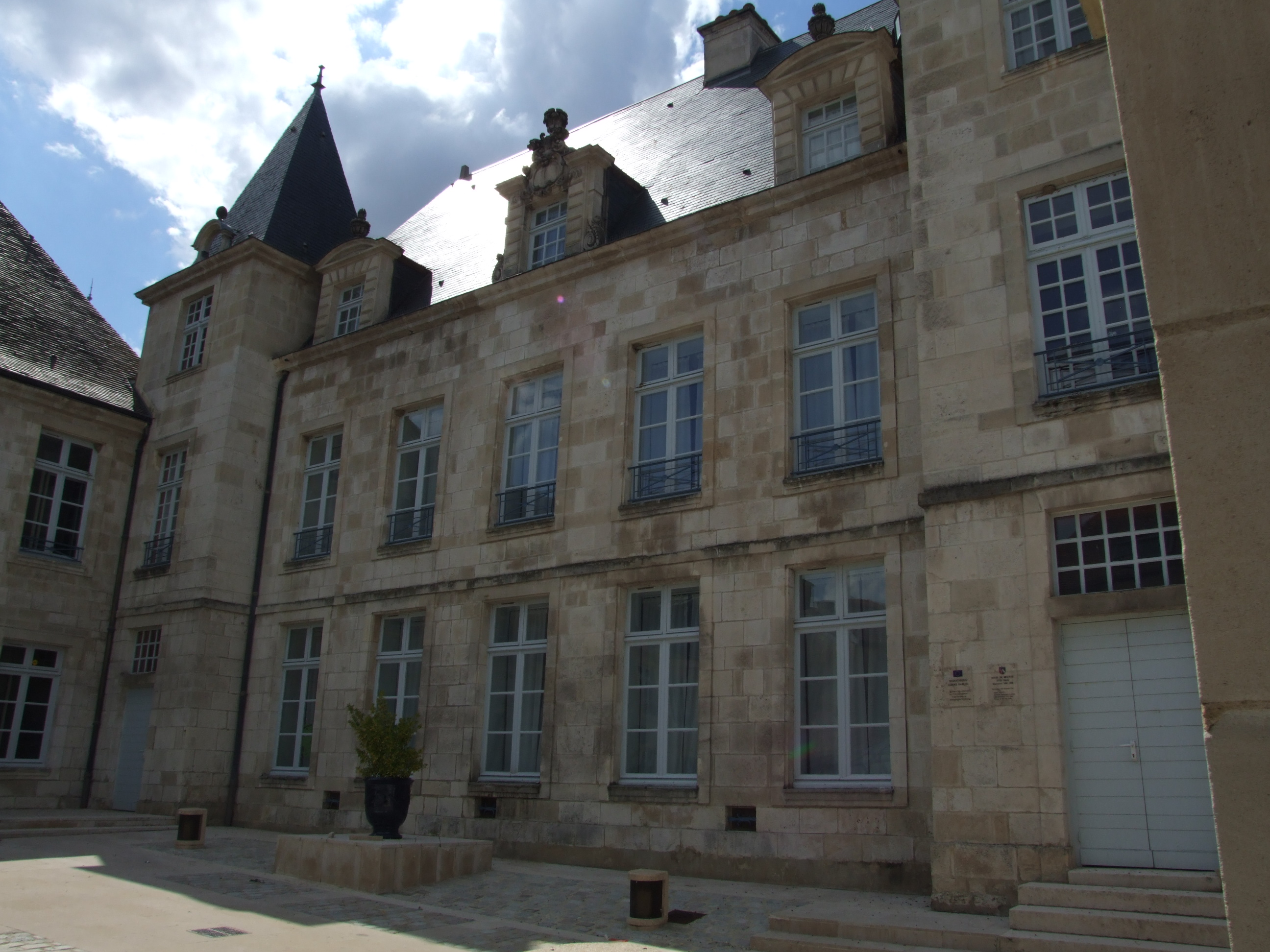
the Library

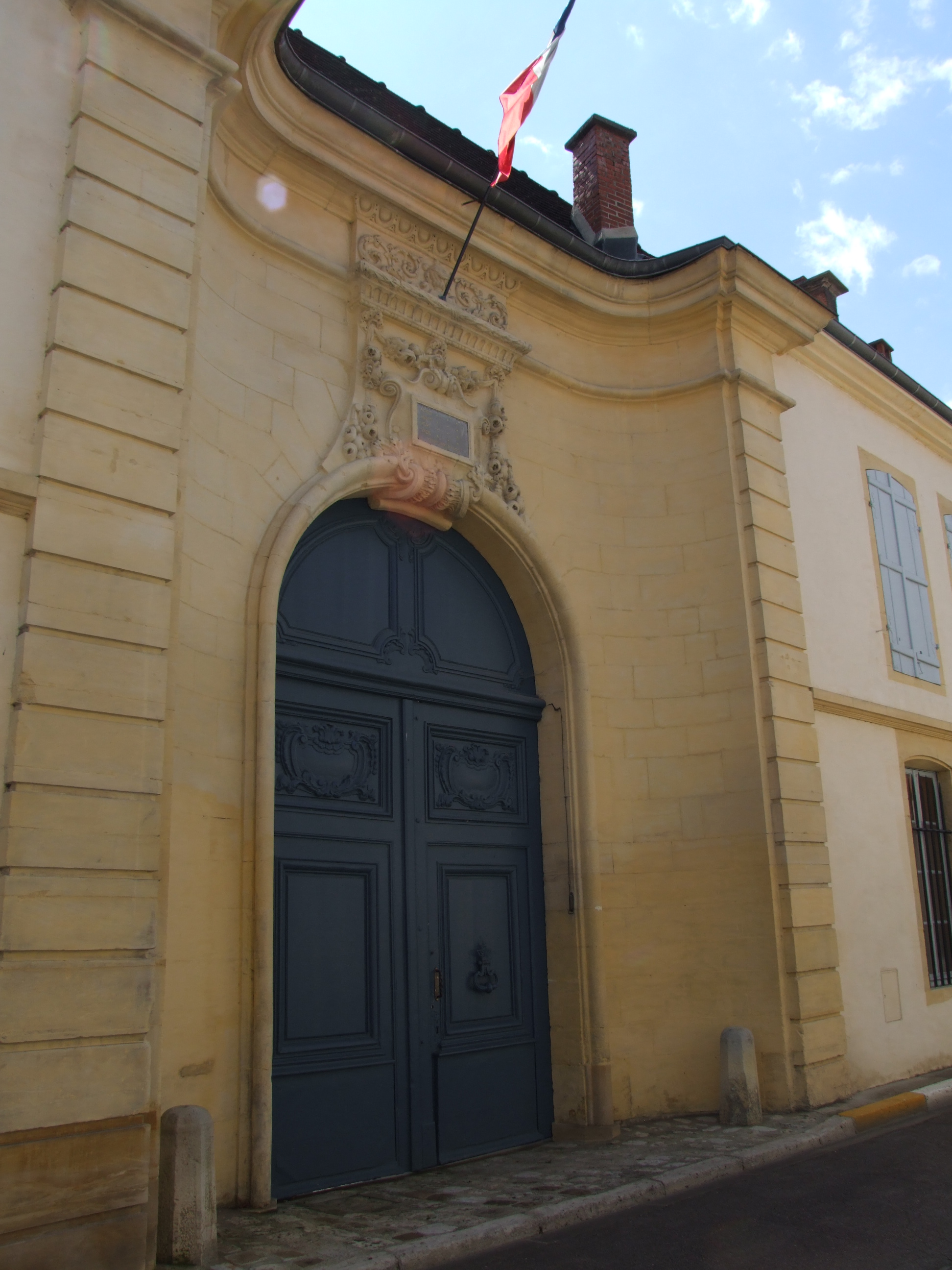
The sub-prefecture

- The Covered Market
- The former Hotel de Surmont (now the Post Office)
- The Marcasselles Mill

The commune has many buildings and sites that are registered as historical monuments:

- A House at 33 Rue d'Aube (16th century)
- A House at 44 Rue d'Aube (16th century)
- The Petit Clairvaux Storehouse at 24 Rue Beugnot (12th century)
- An Ursuline Convent at Place Carnot (17th century) (now the Town Hall)
- The Doré and son woollen mill at 1bis Rue Chenot (20th century)
- The René Thiéblemont Carpentry factory at Route de Fontaine (20th century)
- The Thuillier Stamping Plant at Avenue du Général Leclerc (20th century)
- The Perfor metalwork factory at 32 avenue du Général Leclerc (20th century)
- The Chevallier Foundry at 30 avenue du Général Leclerc (20th century)
- The Henry Comte Sawmill at rue du Général de Gaulle (20th century)
- A Building at 79 Rue Nationale (16th century)
- A Flourmill at 25 boulevard de la République (18th century)
- A Small Flourmill at 21 boulevard de la République (18th century)
- A Building at 1 petite rue Saint-Pierre (15th century)
- A Hotel at 15, 17 rue Saint-Pierre; 4 rue Delaunay (15th century) (now a Museum and Library)
- A Building at 4 rue Saint-Pierre (18th century)
- The Joseph de Bucy Diesel motor works at rue du Sommerard (20th century)
- The Breton-Cordier Tannery at 2 rue des Tanneries (19th century)
- The Three Towers House at 9 rue des Trois-Tours (16th century)
- The Sub-Prefecture (18th century)
- An Oppidum (Iron Age)

=== Religious heritage ===
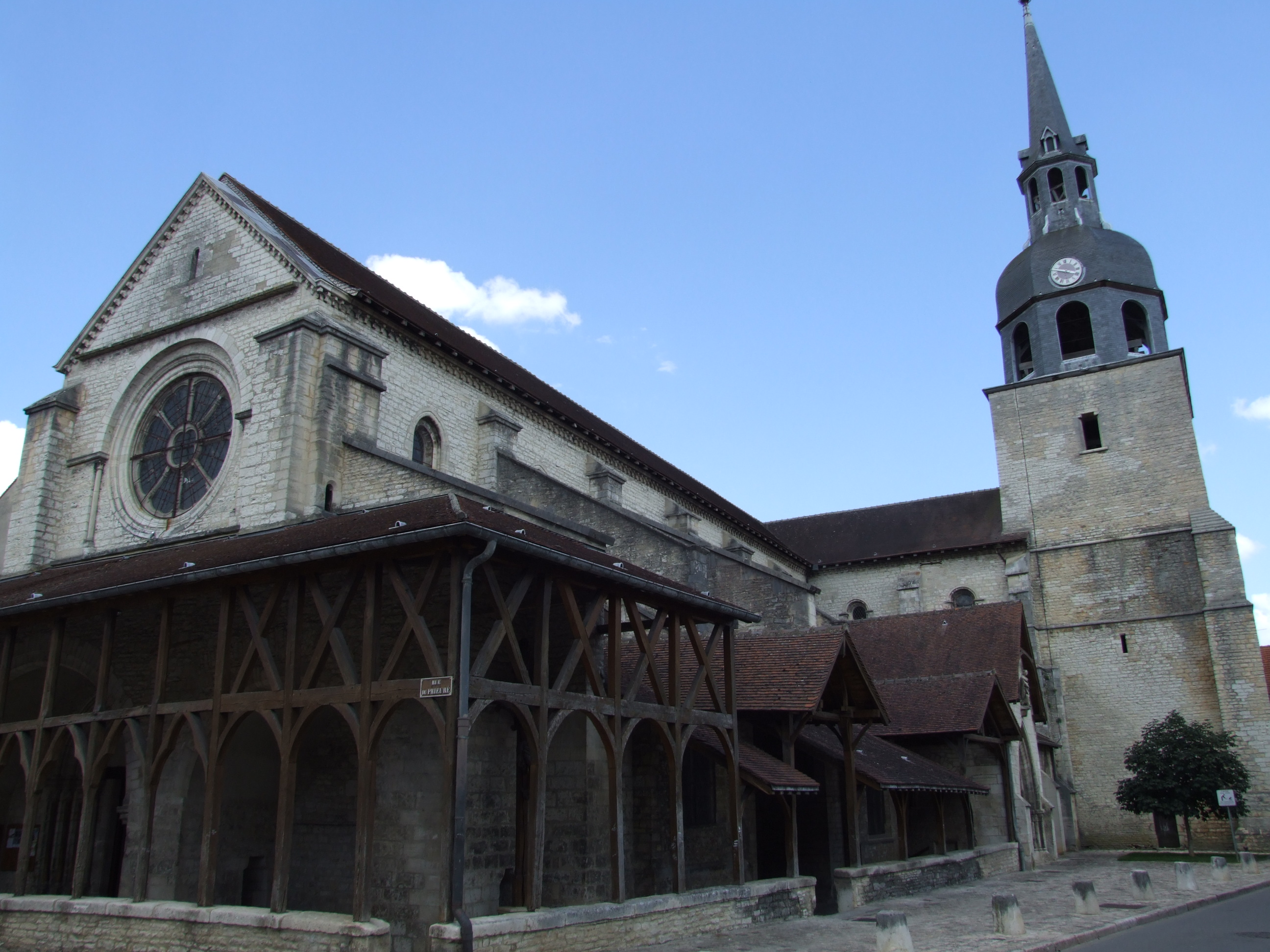
The Church of Saint Peter

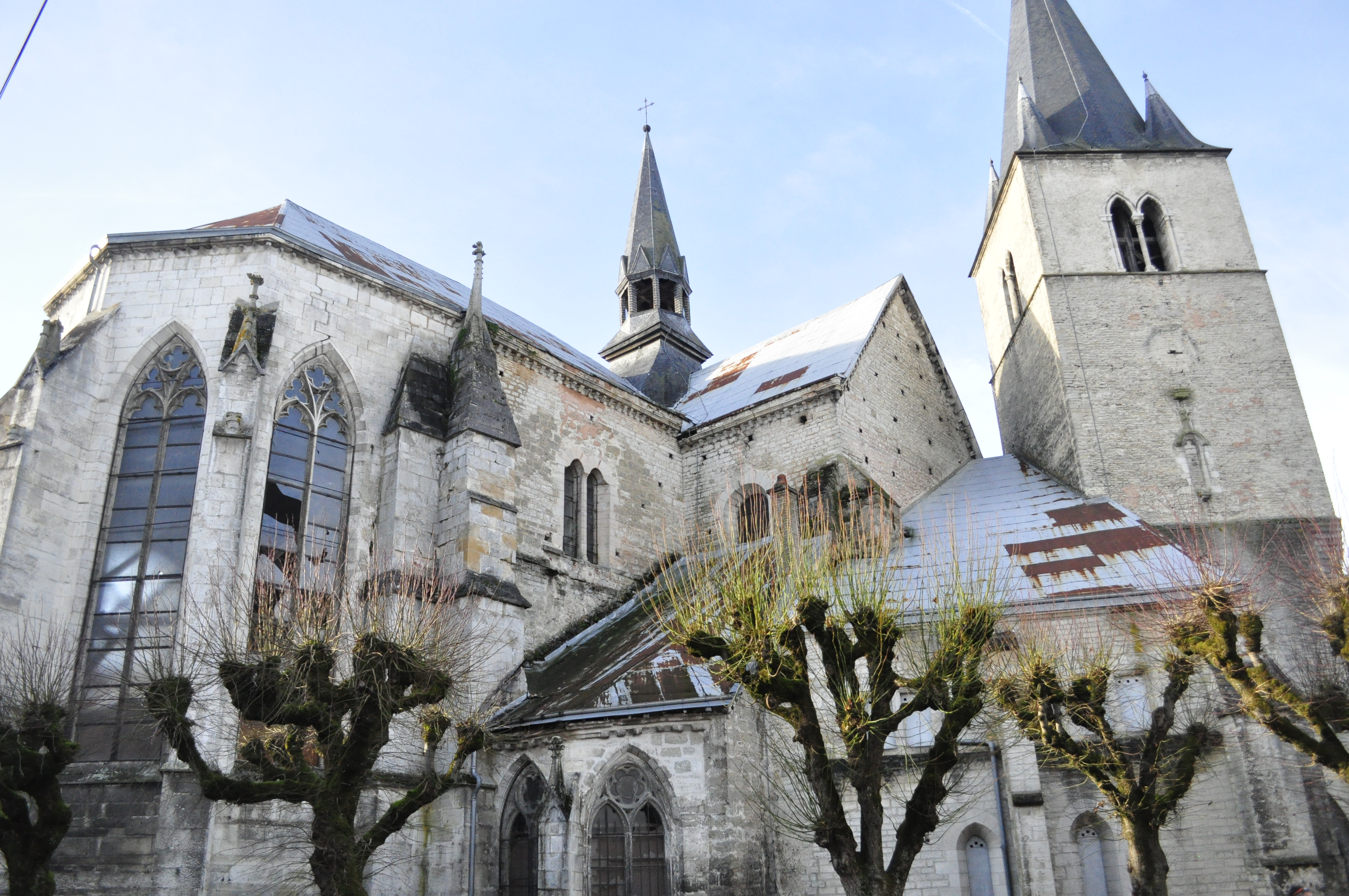
The Church of Saint Maclou

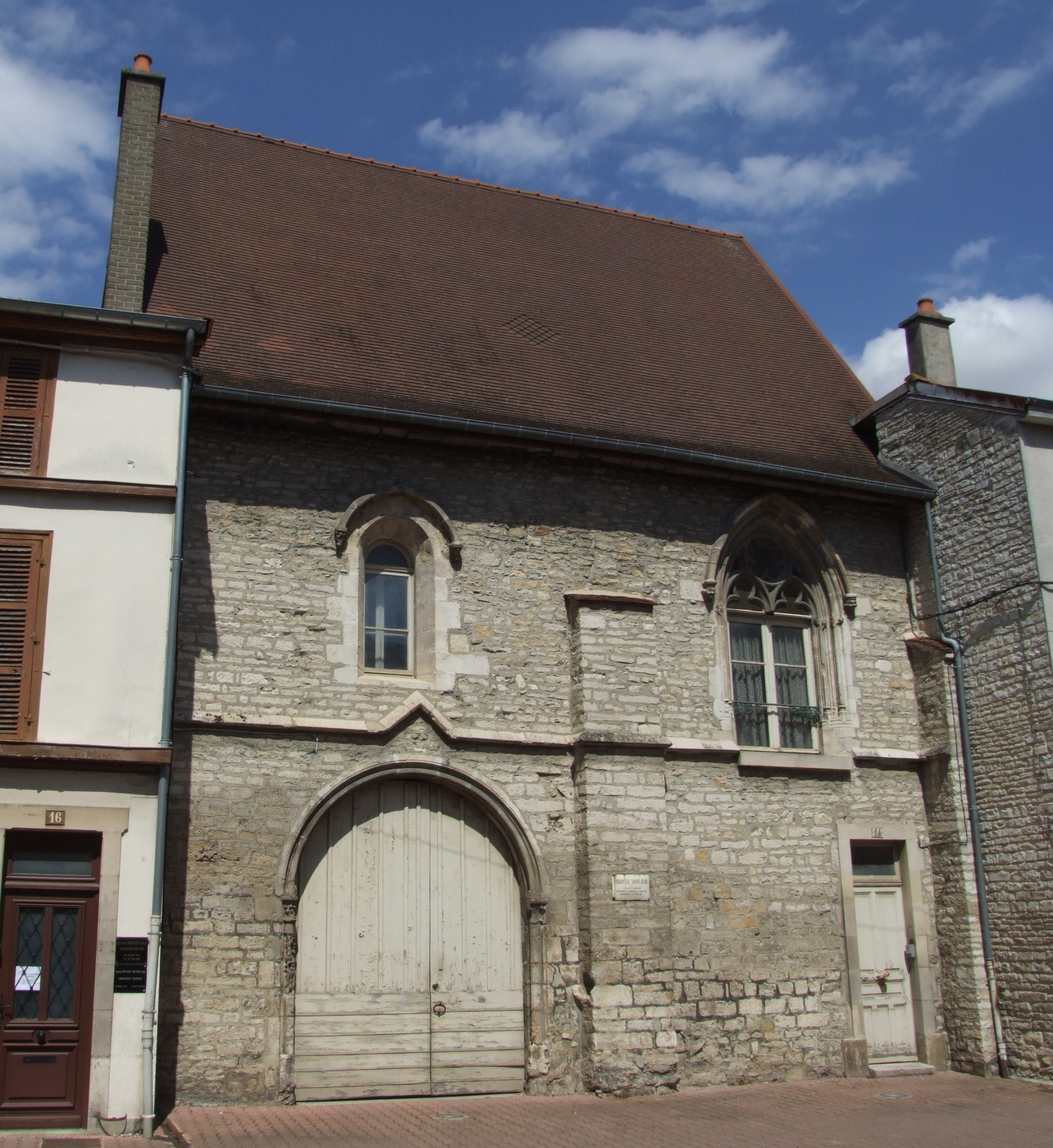
The Templar Chapel

- The Chapel of Saint John from the Knights Templar then the Knights Hospitaller.
- The Chapel of Sainte-Germaine

The commune has three religious buildings that are registered as historical monuments:

- A Priory (16th century)
- The Church of Saint Peter (16th century)
- The Church of Saint Maclou (12th century)

=== Festivals ===
- Cheese festival in June
- Eurythmies Festival, late June.
- Festival "JazzàBar" early September
- A Market every Saturday morning under the covered market, in the Town Hall Square, and in the Rue Nationale
- Local Palm Festival
- Medieval Fair, the first weekend in September
- Gourmet Champagne Promenade in May

== Notable people linked to the commune ==
- Sainte Germaine, martyr in 451, decapitated on the order of Attila
- Jean-François Armand: (born 24 June 1789 - Bar-sur-Aube, died 27 March 1883 - Gravières), École polytechnique, Corps des Ponts, MP for Aube (1837–1848);
- Bertrand de Bar-sur-Aube, troubador of the 13th century.
- Étienne d’Acier, poet, disciple of Pierre de Ronsard, 16th century.
- Gaston Bachelard, philosopher (1884–1962).
- Armand Beauvais, rural painter (1840–1911).
- Jacques Claude Beugnot, Count of Beugnot (1761–1835).
- Maurice Emmanuel, musicologist and French composer born in Bar-sur-Aube in 1862 and died in Paris in 1938.
- Albert Gabriel, architect, specialist on Anatolia, professor in the College of France and the University of Istanbul (1883–1972).
- Jeanne de Valois-Saint-Rémy, Countess of the Motte, instigator of the Affair of the Diamond Necklace.
- Marc Rétaux de Villette, forger, implicated in the Affair of the Diamond Necklace
- Marinette Pichon, born on 26 November 1975 in Bar-sur-Aube, former French footballer who played for FCF Juvisy and in the France women's national football team (to 2006, 112 caps and 82 goals).
- Gaston Cheq, saviour of the Aube vineyards, born on 14 January 1866 in Bar-sur-Aube.
- Alexandre Du Sommerard, archaeologist born in Bar-sur-Aube in 1779, died at Saint-Cloud on 19 August 1842, founder of the Musée de Cluny (Paris).
- Charlemagne de Maupas, prefect of police in Paris, one of the architects of the French coup d'état of 1851.
- Jules Franceschi, French Sculptor of nature (born in Bar-sur-Aube on 11 January 1825, died in Paris on 1 September 1893)

== See also ==
- Communes of the Aube department
- Bertrand de Bar-sur-Aube - medieval French poet

=== External links ===
- Bar-sur-Aube Official Website
