= Claude-Laurent Bourgeois de Jessaint =

French aristocrat and civic administrator

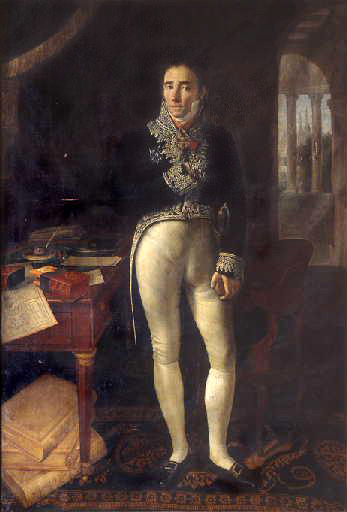
- A painting of de Jessaint
- Born: 26 April 1764; Jessains, Aube, France
- Died: 8 January 1853 (aged 88); Château de Beaulieu, Trannes, Aube, France
- Other names: Citizen Jessaint-Bourgeois; Baron de Jessaint
- Occupation: Prefect of Marne

Claude-Laurent Bourgeois de Jessaint (26 April 1764 – 8 January 1853) was a French aristocrat and civic administrator. Born into an aristocratic family, he was a classmate of Napoleon Bonaparte at the military academy at Brienne-le-Château. A moderate supporter of the 1789 French Revolution, de Jessaint was afterwards installed as mayor of Bar-sur-Aube, although he lost his mayorship after a purge of aristocrats in 1797. De Jessaint was appointed prefect of the Marne department in 1800, under Napoleon's consulship. He remained in this role until he requested retirement in 1838. He held the position through numerous regime changes and was the only pre-1828 prefect to stay in post after the 1830 July Revolution.

== Early life and career ==
Claude-Laurent Bourgeois de Jessaint was born into an Ancien Régime aristocratic family at Jessains, Aube, on 26 April 1764. He was a classmate of Napoleon Bonaparte at the military academy at Brienne-le-Château and showed some support for the French Revolution, which began in 1789. De Jessaint was appointed mayor of Bar-sur-Aube in the same year but was dismissed on 18 Fructidor Year V (4 September 1797) (Note: Between 1793 and 1805 the French government used the French Republican calendar, conversions to the Gregorian calendar are shown in brackets.) when his aristocratic background was deemed unsuitable. During this period he lost his aristocratic title and was known as Citizen Jessaint-Bourgeois.

== Prefect of Marne ==
De Jessaint was appointed prefect of the Marne department at some point between 20 Ventôse (11 March) and 24 Germinal (14 April) in Year VIII (1800). The prefect corps was created that year by Napoleon as First Consul of the French Republic and served as the chief administrator of the department for the government. De Jessaint served as prefect of the Marne uninterrupted until 1838, surviving many regime changes including the transition to the First French Empire, the first Bourbon Restoration, the Hundred Days, the second Bourbon Restoration and the July Monarchy.

De Jessaint was one of only seven prefects retained in their posts after the 1830 July Revolution and the only one who predated the term of the moderate royalist Jean Baptiste Gay, vicomte de Martignac, prime minister from 1828 to 1830. De Jessaint retired, at his own request, on 1 November 1838. His 38 year tenure was the longest of any French prefect, the next being Lefebvre Du Grosriez who served 22 years as prefect of Savoie (ending in 1905). De Jessaint was granted an annual pension of 5,992 francs on 22 February 1839 which was backdated to 26 November 1838. He died at the Château de Beaulieu in Trannes, Aube on 8 January 1853.

== Honours ==
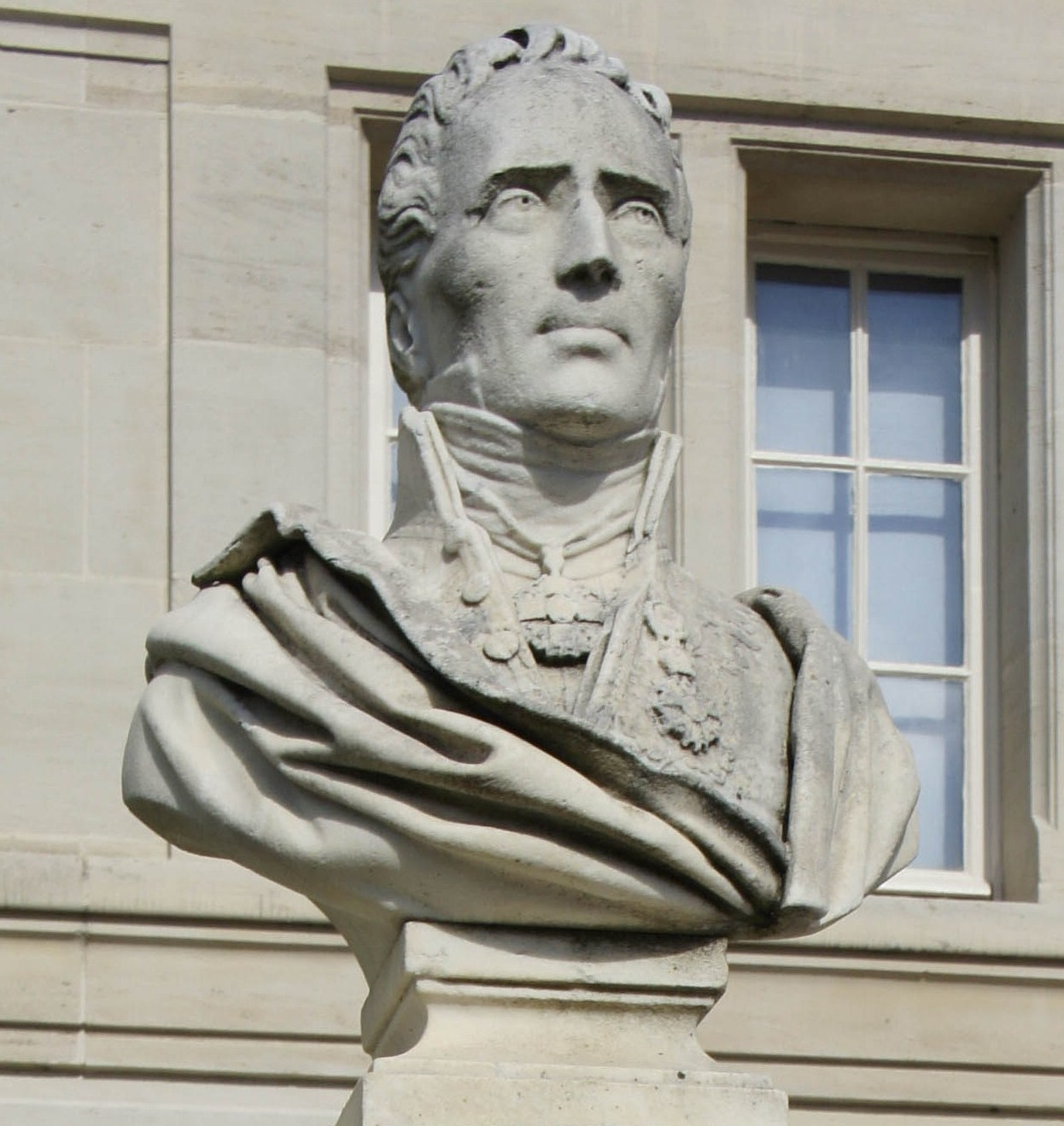
A statue of de Jessaint that faces the Marne department hôtel de préfecture (administrative centre) in Châlons-en-Champagne

De Jessaint was appointed a knight of the Legion of Honour on 25 Prairial Year XII (14 June 1804). He became a knight of the Empire on 16 September 1808 and a baron on 19 December 1809 (his title was Baron of Jessaint). De Jessaint was appointed an officer of the Legion of Honour in 1814, a commander in 1815 and a grand officer in 1825. He was appointed a viscount on 6 July 1826 and entered the Chamber of Peers on 10 November 1838. De Jessaint lost his peerage titles when the incoming French Second Republic abolished them in 1848.
