= Château d'Arrentières =

Castle in France

Coordinates: 48°15′36″N 4°44′37″E

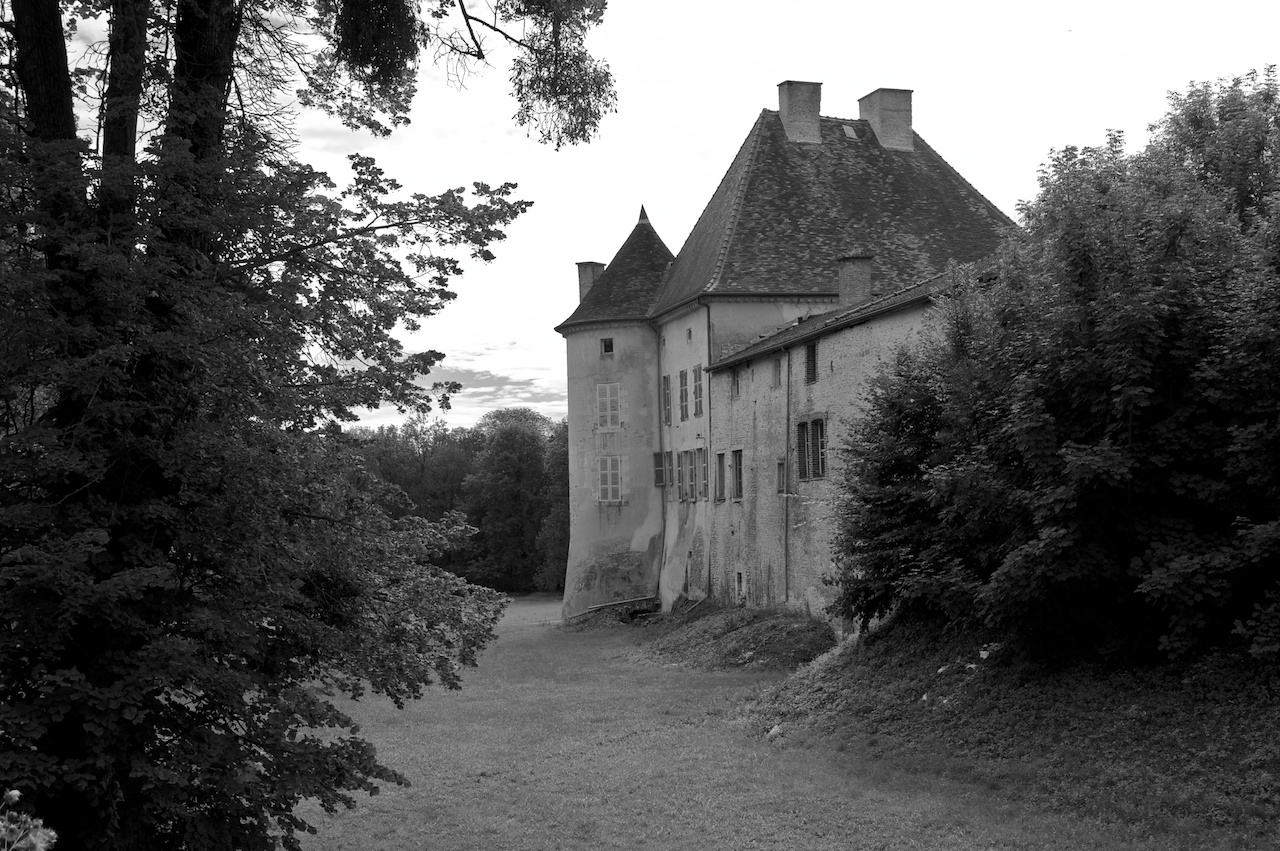

The Château d'Arrentières is a castle in the commune of Arrentières in the Aube département of France.

== History ==
It was one of the first fortified houses of the Knights Templar from the commandery at Thors who were lords in the 12th century.

It was recorded in 1238 as a castle and Jean d'Arrentières was authorised, in 1319, to found a chapel there. He was an important knight with his post as bailiff of le Vermandois and Chaumont. It was razed, because of felony by the lord, on the order of Louis XIII who had not accepted his conversion to Protestantism.

The remains are the 13th century ditches and towers, and two towers and an underground room dating from the 15th century. One of the towers has been remodelled as a dovecote and the other serves as the base for a square building of the 18th century.

It was the residence of Louis Ladislas of Lassus in the middle of the 19th century.

Privately owned, parts of the structure (moat, curtain walls, underground rooms along the south curtain wall, dovecote, façades and roofs of the corps de logis and the east tower) have been listed since 1994 as a monument historique by the French Ministry of Culture.

== See also ==
- List of castles in France
