= Ailleville =

Commune in Grand Est, France

- Commune
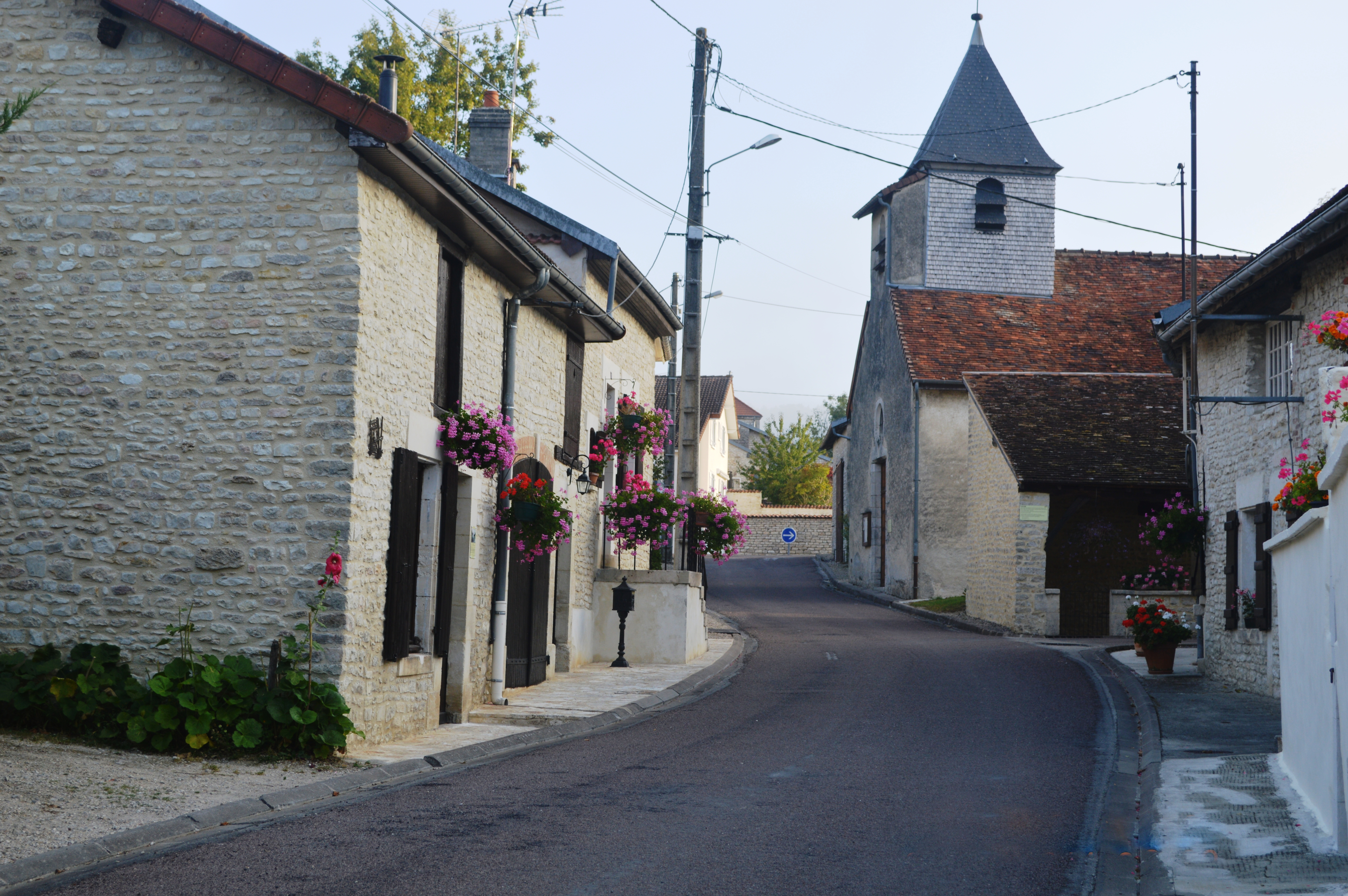
- The church and surroundings in Ailleville
- Location of Ailleville
- Location within France Location within Grand Est
- Coordinates: 48°15′12″N 4°40′55″E
- Country: France
- Region: Grand Est
- Department: Aube
- Arrondissement: Bar-sur-Aube
- Canton: Bar-sur-Aube
- Intercommunality: Région de Bar-sur-Aube

Government
  - Mayor (2020–2026): Claude Hackel
- Area^{1}: 5.01 km^{2} (1.93 sq mi)
- Elevation: 164 m (538 ft)
- Highest elevation: 296 m (971 ft)
- Lowest elevation: 156 m (512 ft)
- Population (2023): 223
  - Density: 44.5/km^{2} (115/sq mi)
- Time zone: UTC+01:00 (CET)
  - Summer (DST): UTC+02:00 (CEST)
- INSEE/Postal code: 10002 /10200
- ^{1} French Land Register data, which excludes lakes, ponds, glaciers > 1 km^{2} (0.386 sq mi or 247 acres) and river estuaries.

Ailleville (French pronunciation: [ajvil]) is a commune in the Aube department in the Grand Est region of northern-central France.

The inhabitants are known as Aillevillois or Aillevilloises.

== Geography ==
Ailleville is located in the valley of the Aube river some 2 km north-west of Bar-sur-Aube. The commune is traversed from Bar-sur-Aube in the south-east crossing the heart of the commune and the town to exit towards Arsonval in the north-west. There are no other highways in the commune other than small country lanes. There are no villages or hamlets other than Ailleville. The north-east of the commune is dominated by the forests of Envers de Bretonvau and Bois de Val Joudry. The rest of the commune is farmland. The southern part of the commune is traversed by a railway line running from Bar-sur-Aube railway station in the south-east to the next station at Arret-de-Jessains in the north-west. There is no station in the commune with the nearest station at Bar-sur-Aube. The nearest cities are Chaumont some 40 km to the south-east and Troyes some 40 km west.

The Aube river crosses the southern boundary of the commune and forms a small portion of the southern border of the commune. There are no discernible streams in the commune.

== History ==
The village was founded in 6 A.D. with the name "Aquilavilla" (a villa belonging to a Roman legionnaire in Latin). This villa was undoubtedly given to a Roman soldier at the end of his military service next to the famous Agrippa Roman road (Boulogne/Langres/Lyon/Turin). The name of the village changed many times:

- Alivilla in 1152
- Aquilevilla in 1170
- Aillevilla in 1222
- Aquilavilla in 1253
- Aileville in 1270
- Ailleville in 1306.

The Merovingians established themselves in the Roman village and in 1076 the village changed dramatically with its attachment, along with all the County of Bar sur Aube, to the County of Champagne. With the reputation of the fairs in Champagne and its proximity to Bar sur Aube, the village increased in importance. A Church, an Abbey (the Abbey of Val des Vignes), and a Chateau were built. The old vineyards planted by the Romans became reputable under Louis XIV.

The history of Ailleville was relatively peaceful until the Napoleonic Campaign of 1814. In February, during the Bar-sur-Aube battle, the village was devastated as many others in the area. Twenty-two families in all, most of the inhabitants, were sheltered in the castle. They rebuilt the village afterwards, although several, who were destitute, deprived and helpless, had to depart.

There are some remains of the Gallo-Roman era in the commune. The inhabitants were once known as "Braments."

== Administration ==
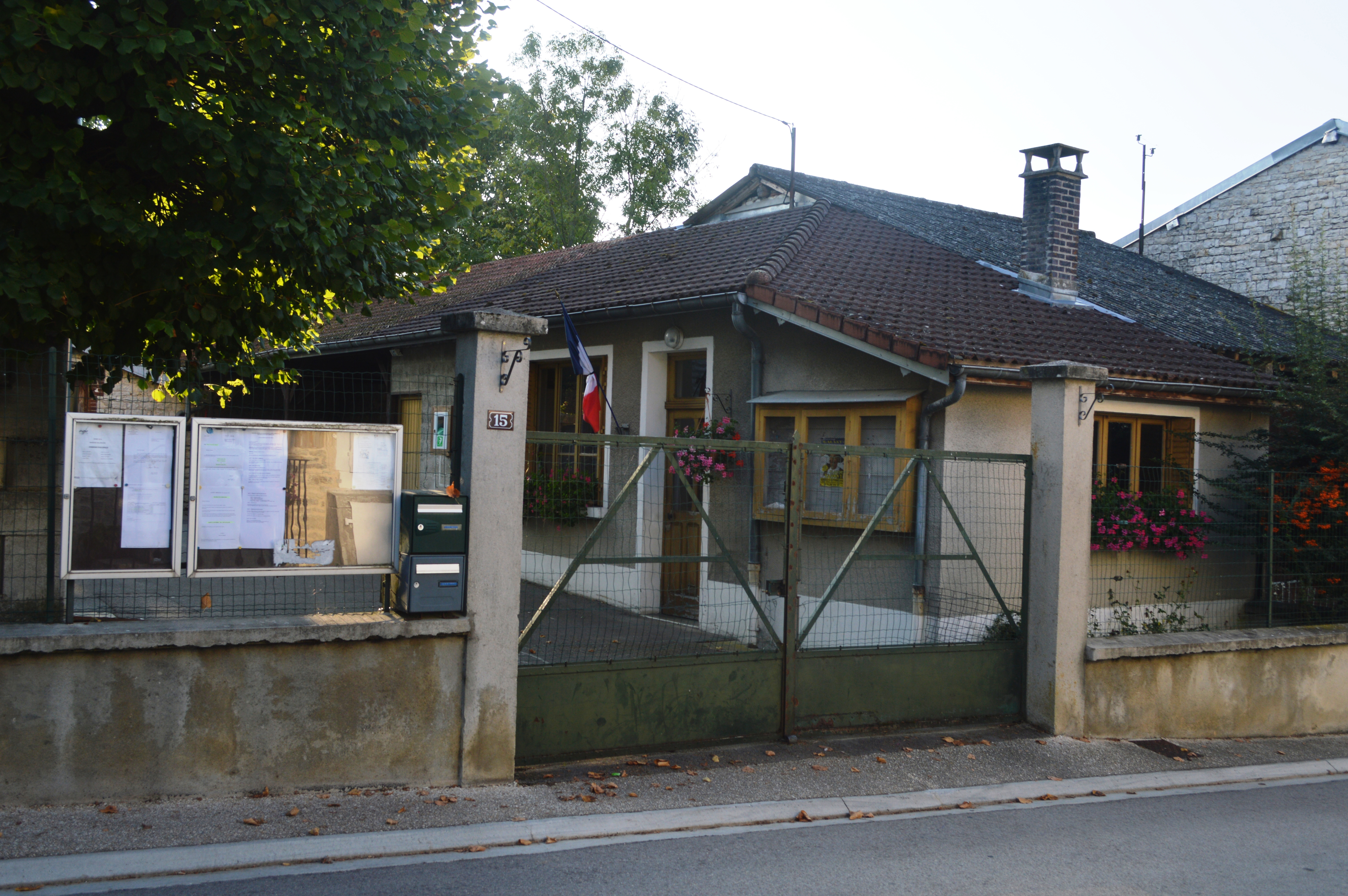
The Town Hall

List of Successive Mayors of Ailleville

From	To	Name
	1857	Poignee
2001	2008	Jean Beaumont
2008		Gérard Carrier
2014	2026	Jean-Michel Beaujoin
2020	2026	Claude Hackel

== Population ==
Historical population
Year	Pop.	±% p.a.
1968	202	—
1975	230	+1.87%
1982	220	−0.63%
1990	232	+0.67%
1999	218	−0.69%
2007	271	+2.76%
2012	273	+0.15%
2017	251	−1.67%
2023	223	−1.95%
Source: INSEE

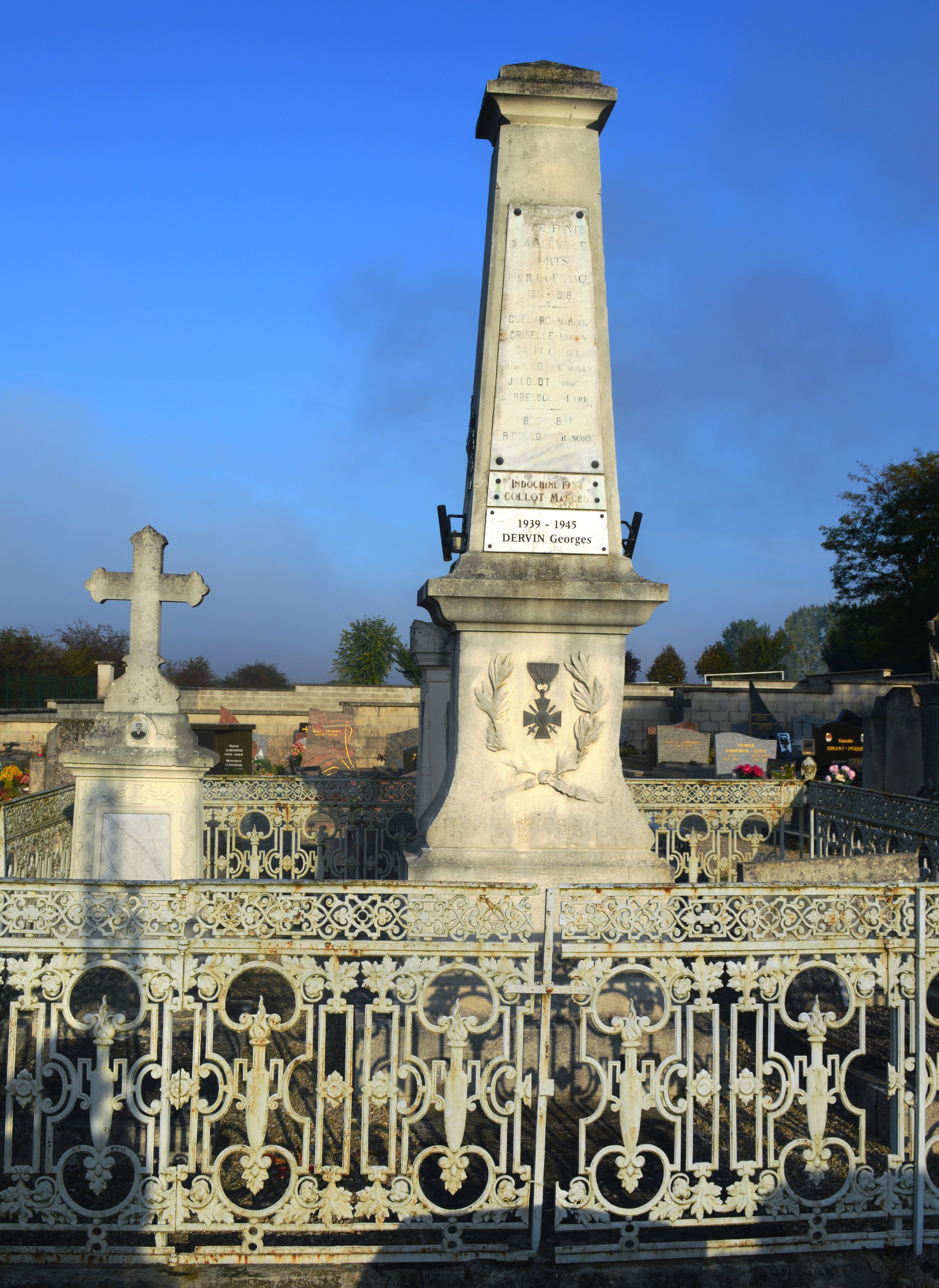
Ailleville War Memorial

== Sites and Monuments ==
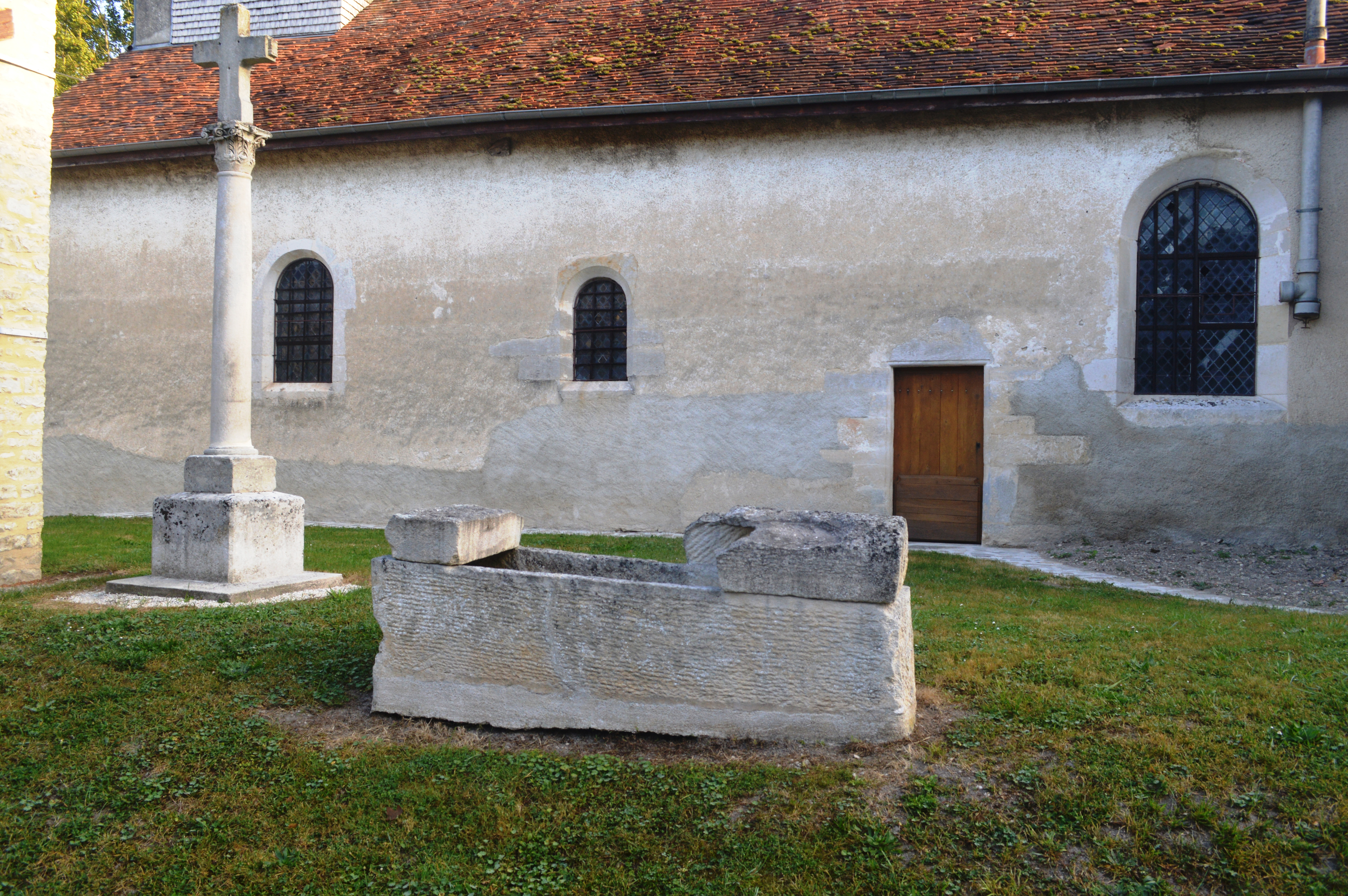
A Sarcophagus and the Cistercian Cross

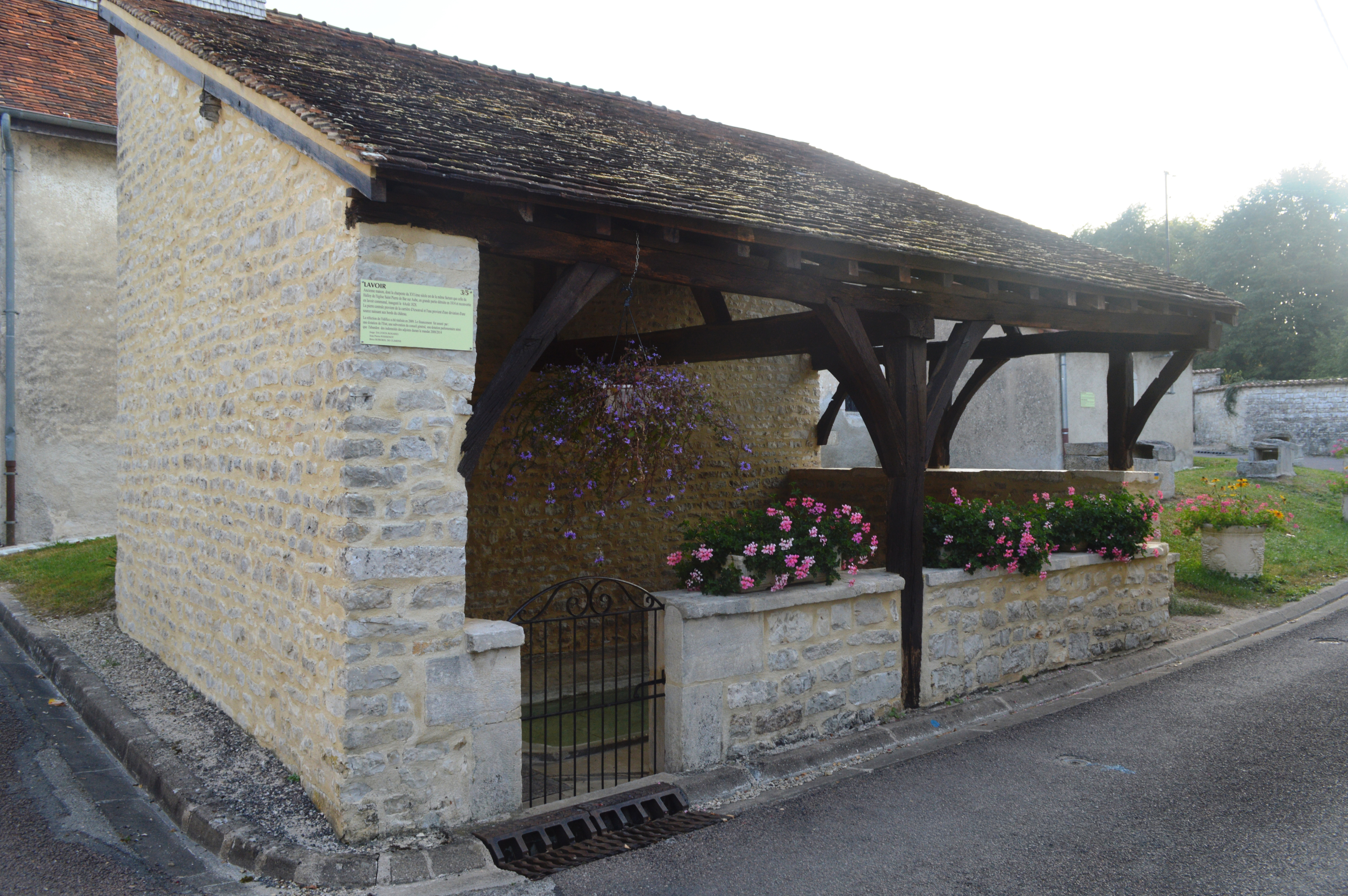
The Lavoir (Public Laundry)

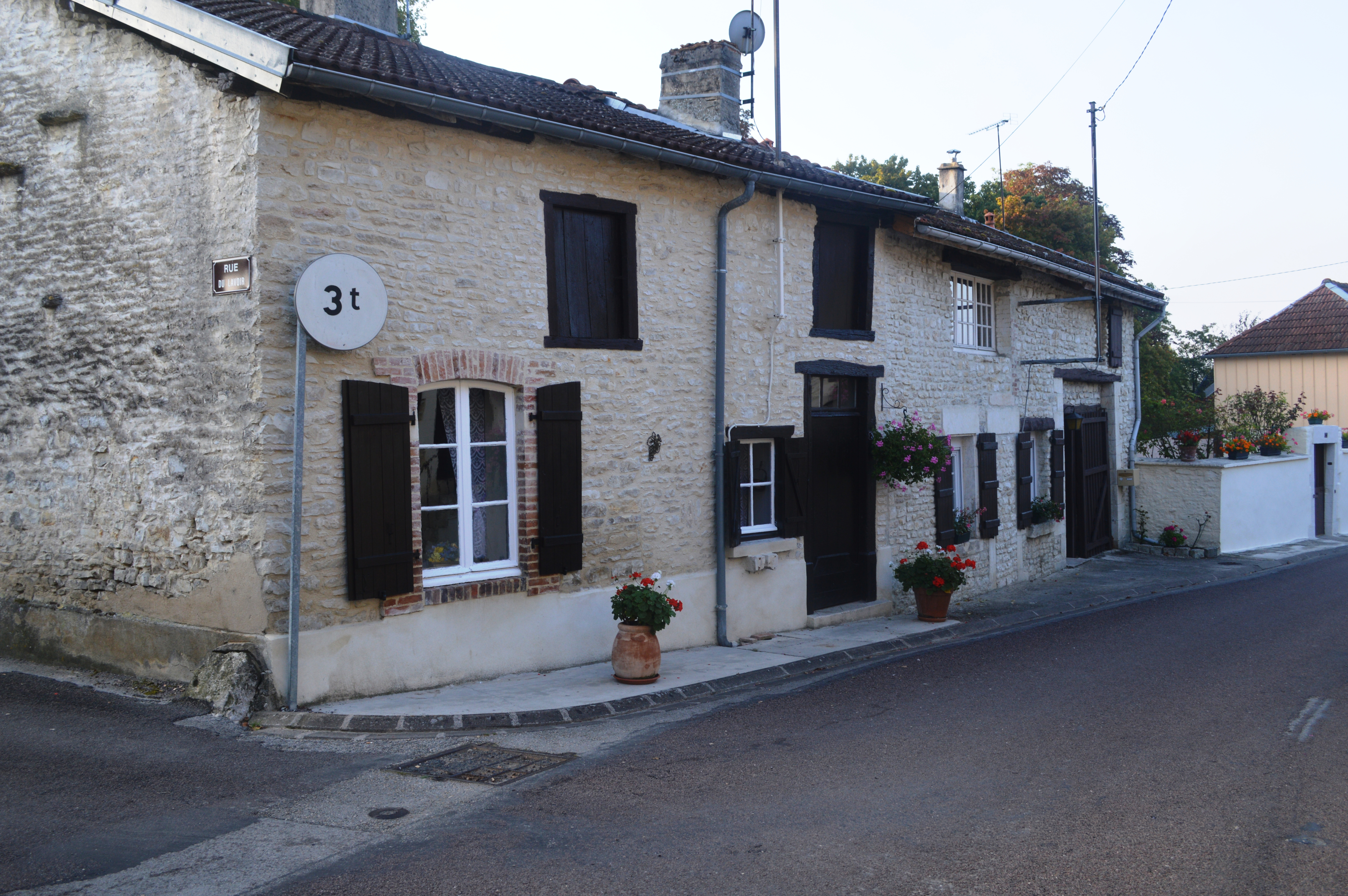
Surviving houses from 1814

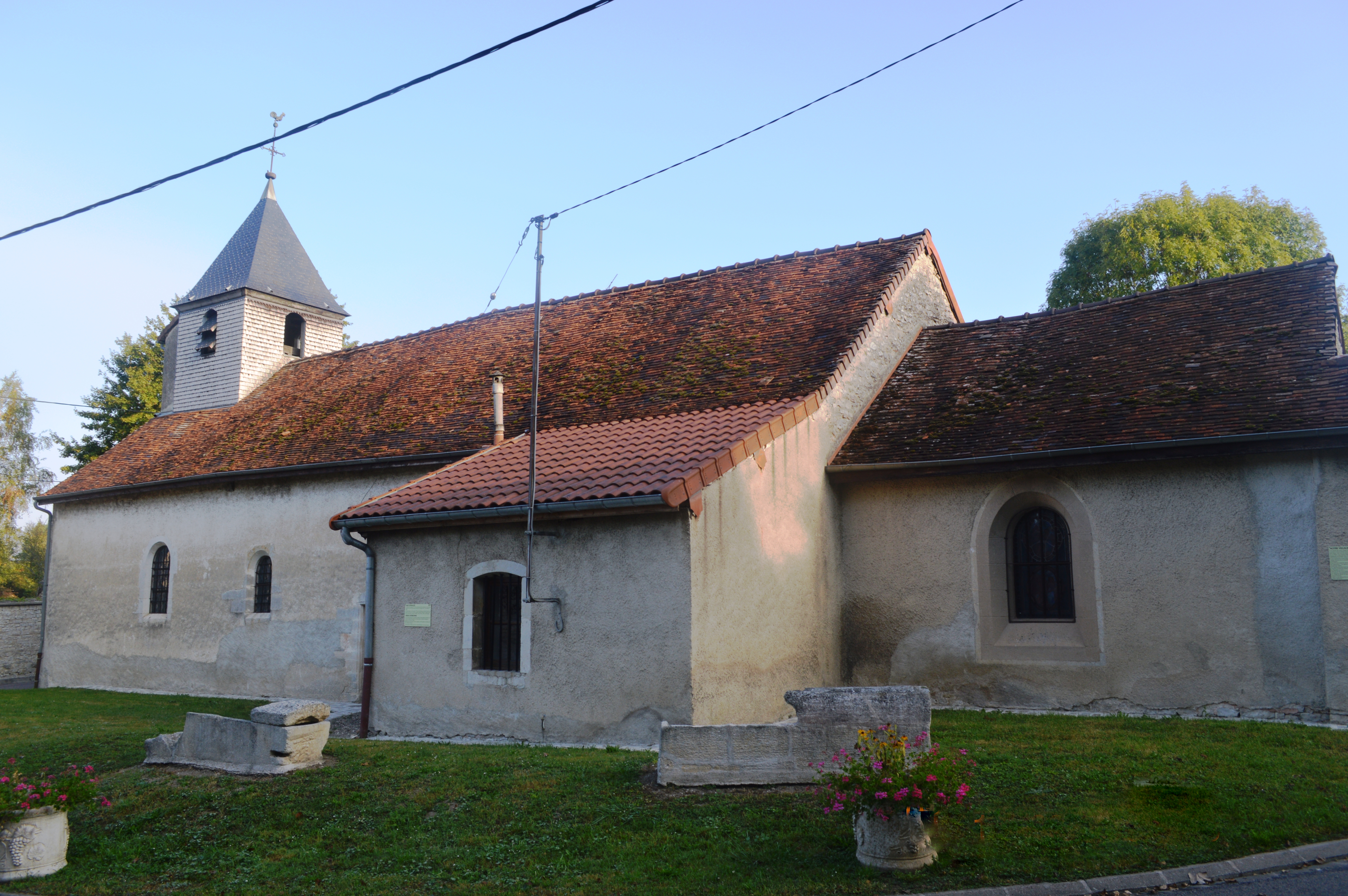
The Church of Saint Martin

- A Chateau from the time of Henry IV
- A Roman road from Langres to Châlons-en-Champagne
- The Presence of Merovingian sarcophagi from the 6th-7th century around the Lavoir. These sarcophagi were found in the 1970s by the local historian Roger Rubaud at a place called Les Longues-Roies above the village.
- A Cistercian Cross next to the church from the 16th century in Corinthian style proving the existence of a Cistercian Abbey in the valley founded by the Lords of Jaucourt in 1215 at Gué de Ternant. Destroyed then rebuilt in 1309 at the foot of Côte Jobert. After being in severe decline in the 18th century it was entirely destroyed in the French Revolution.
- A Château from the 17th century flanked by four turrets.
- A Dovecote
- The Church of Saint Martin. The church is a simple Romanesque building from the 12th century. The choir is narrower than the nave. The building formerly depended on the chapter of Saint-Maclou of Bar-sur-Aube. The church contains many items that are registered as historical objects:
  - A Statuette: Education of the Virgin (18th century)
  - 4 Bas-reliefs: the Evangelists (17th century)
  - A Statue: Saint Nicholas (19th century)
  - A Statuette: Saint Martin (18th century)
  - An Altar, Retable, and Tabernacle (18th century)
  - A Tombstone of Jean de Lauparet (disappeared) (1552)
  - A Tombstone for the Guillard family (1703)
  - A Ciborium (1821)
  - A Chalice (1821)
  - A Chalice (19th century)
  - A Paten (19th century)
  - An Incense lamp (1821)
  - A Monstrance (19th century)
  - A Statue: Saint Ambroise (18th century)
  - A Statue: Saint Radegonde (16th century)
  - A Statue: Christ on the Cross (17th century)
  - A Stoup (stolen) (18th century)
  - The Furniture in the Church (17th century)

== See also ==
- Communes of the Aube department
