= Jessains =

Commune in Grand Est, France

- Commune
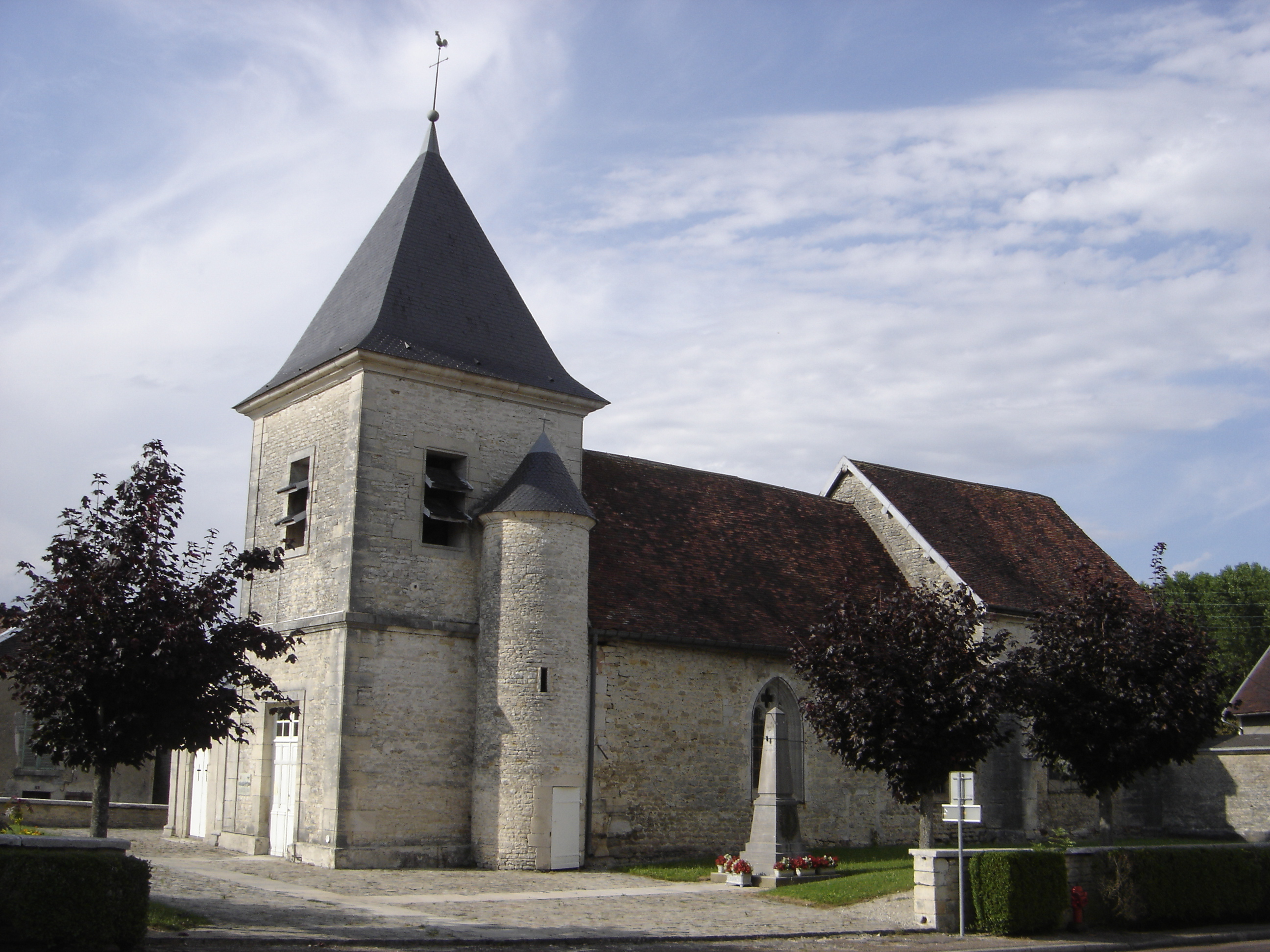
- The church in Jessains

- Coat of arms
- Location of Jessains
- Location within France Location within Grand Est
- Coordinates: 48°17′50″N 4°34′42″E
- Country: France
- Region: Grand Est
- Department: Aube
- Arrondissement: Bar-sur-Aube
- Canton: Vendeuvre-sur-Barse

Government
  - Mayor (2020–2026): Dominique Descharmes
- Area^{1}: 10.88 km^{2} (4.20 sq mi)
- Elevation: 135 m (443 ft)
- Population (2023): 251
  - Density: 23.1/km^{2} (59.8/sq mi)
- Time zone: UTC+01:00 (CET)
  - Summer (DST): UTC+02:00 (CEST)
- INSEE/Postal code: 10178 /10140
- ^{1} French Land Register data, which excludes lakes, ponds, glaciers > 1 km^{2} (0.386 sq mi or 247 acres) and river estuaries.

Jessains (French pronunciation: [ʒɛsɛ̃]) is a commune in the Aube department in north-central France.

== Population ==
Historical population
Year	Pop.	±% p.a.
1968	254	—
1975	235	−1.10%
1982	272	+2.11%
1990	257	−0.71%
1999	243	−0.62%
2007	248	+0.25%
2012	302	+4.02%
2017	275	−1.86%
2023	251	−1.51%
Source: INSEE

== See also ==
- Communes of the Aube department
- Parc naturel régional de la Forêt d'Orient
