= Colombé-la-Fosse =

Commune in Grand Est, France

- Commune
- Location of Colombé-la-Fosse
- Location within France Location within Grand Est
- Coordinates: 48°15′52″N 4°47′18″E
- Country: France
- Region: Grand Est
- Department: Aube
- Arrondissement: Bar-sur-Aube
- Canton: Bar-sur-Aube

Government
  - Mayor (2020–2026): Christian Debuf
- Area^{1}: 9.31 km^{2} (3.59 sq mi)
- Elevation: 229 m (751 ft)
- Population (2023): 162
  - Density: 17.4/km^{2} (45.1/sq mi)
- Time zone: UTC+01:00 (CET)
  - Summer (DST): UTC+02:00 (CEST)
- INSEE/Postal code: 10102 /10200
- ^{1} French Land Register data, which excludes lakes, ponds, glaciers > 1 km^{2} (0.386 sq mi or 247 acres) and river estuaries.

Colombé-la-Fosse (French pronunciation: [kɔlɔ̃be la fos]) is a commune in the Aube department in north-central France.

== Population ==
Historical population
Year	Pop.	±% p.a.
1968	178	—
1975	151	−2.32%
1982	182	+2.70%
1990	195	+0.87%
1999	237	+2.19%
2007	220	−0.93%
2012	207	−1.21%
2017	192	−1.49%
2023	162	−2.79%
Source: INSEE

== See also ==
- Communes of the Aube department
