= Bordeaux Cathedral =

Historic Catholic cathedral in Bordeaux

Bordeaux Cathedral Cathédrale-Primatiale Saint-André de Bordeaux
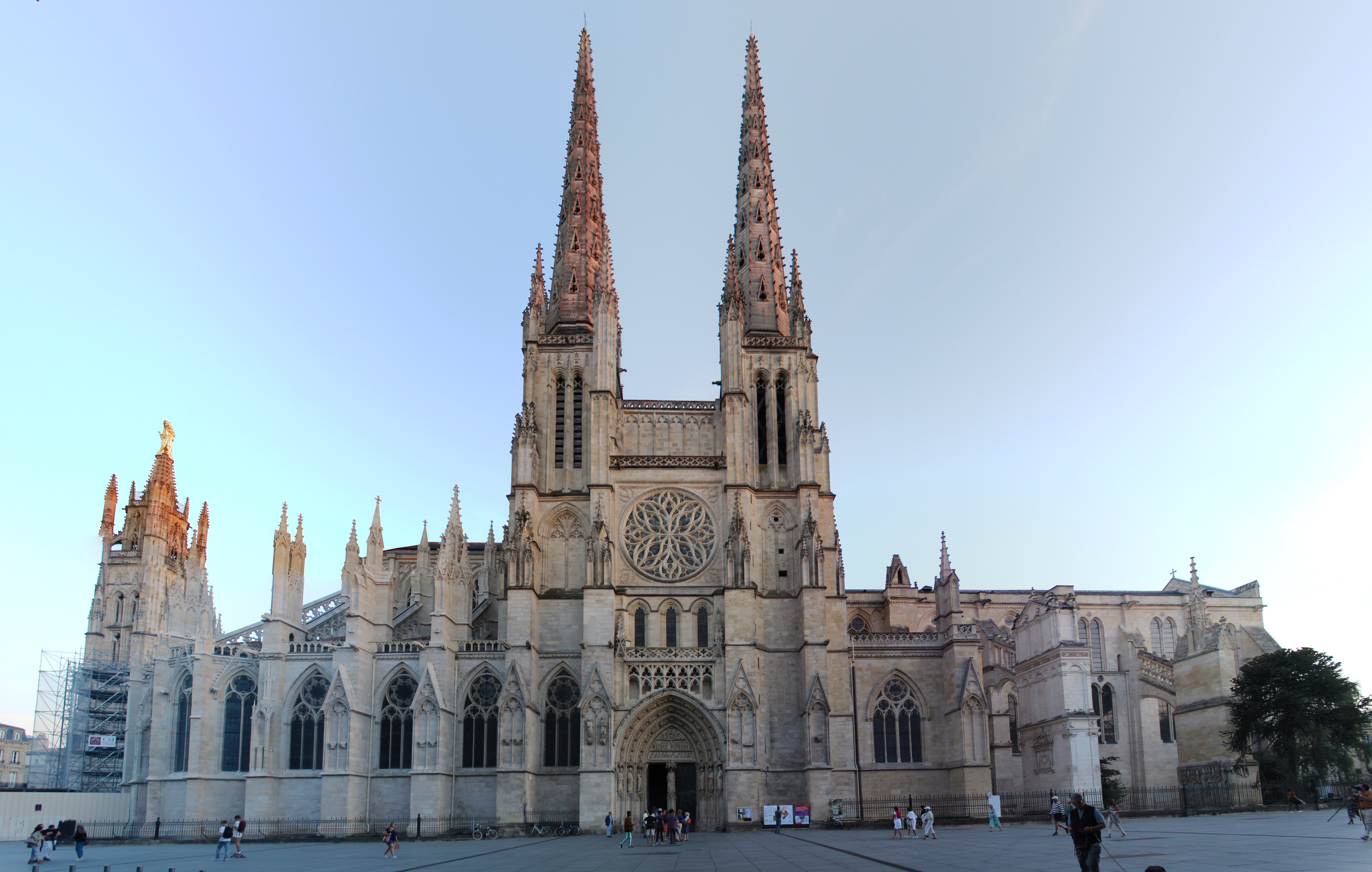
- The north front of the cathedral

Religion
- Affiliation: Catholic Church
- Diocese: Archdiocese of Bordeaux
- Ecclesiastical or organisational status: Cathedral

Location
- Location: Bordeaux, Gironde, Nouvelle-Aquitaine, France
- Interactive map of Bordeaux Cathedral; Cathédrale-Primatiale; Saint-André de Bordeaux
- Coordinates: 44°50′16″N 0°34′39″W

Architecture
- Type: Church
- Style: Gothic, Romanesque
- Materials

UNESCO World Heritage Site
- Official name: Part of Routes of Santiago de Compostela in France
- Criteria: Cultural: (ii), (iv), (vi)
- Reference: 868
- Inscription: 1998 (22nd Session)

Bordeaux Cathedral, officially known as the Primatial Cathedral of St Andrew of Bordeaux (French: Cathédrale-Primatiale Saint-André de Bordeaux), is a Catholic church dedicated to Saint Andrew and located in Bordeaux, France. It is the seat of the Archbishop of Bordeaux.

In 1998, UNESCO designated the Routes of Santiago de Compostela in France as a World Heritage Site, including the three main churches of Bordeaux: the basilica of St Severinus, the basilica of St Michael and the cathedral of St Andrew.

== History ==
=== Carolingian and Romanesque church ===
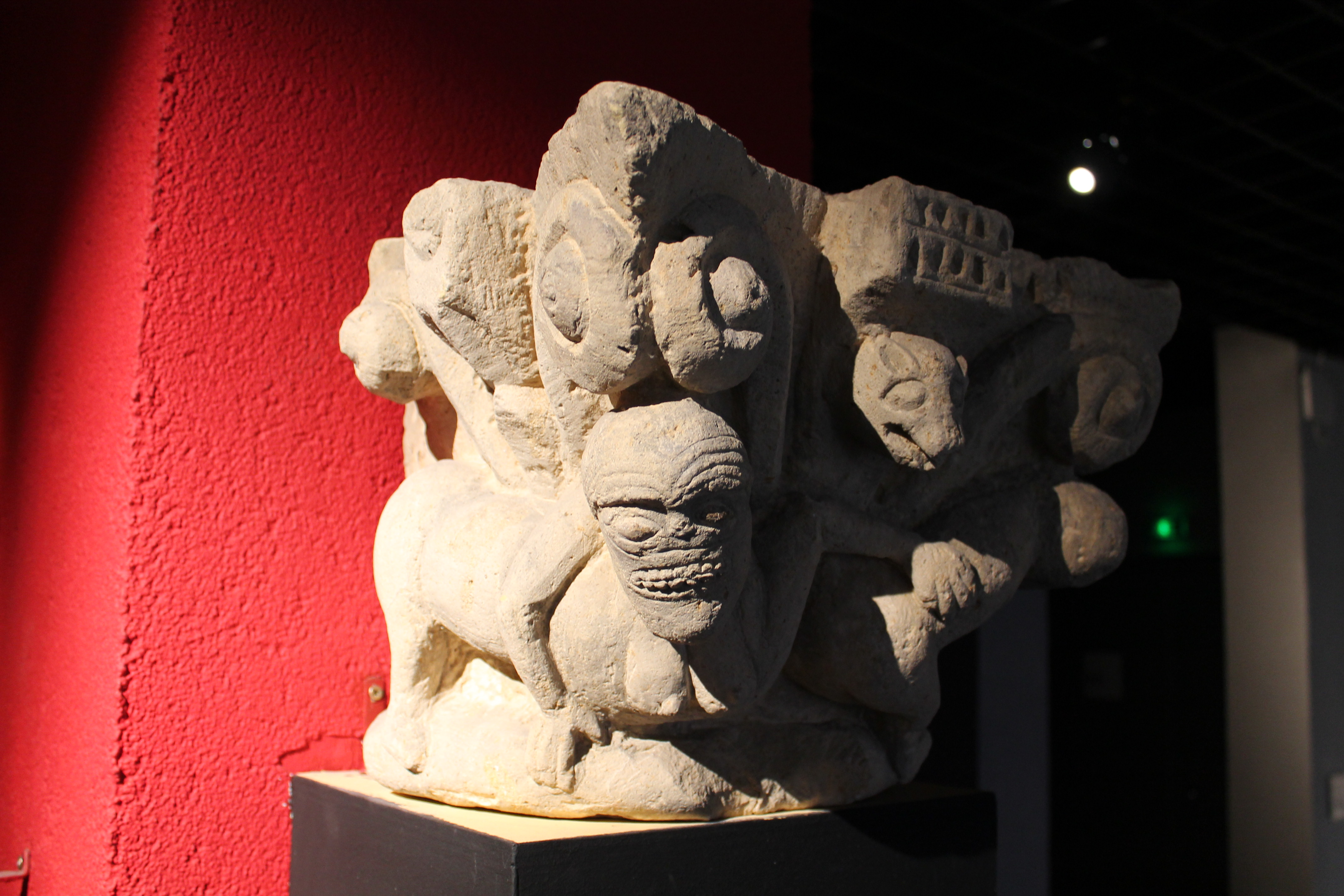
Romanesque capital from old cathedral

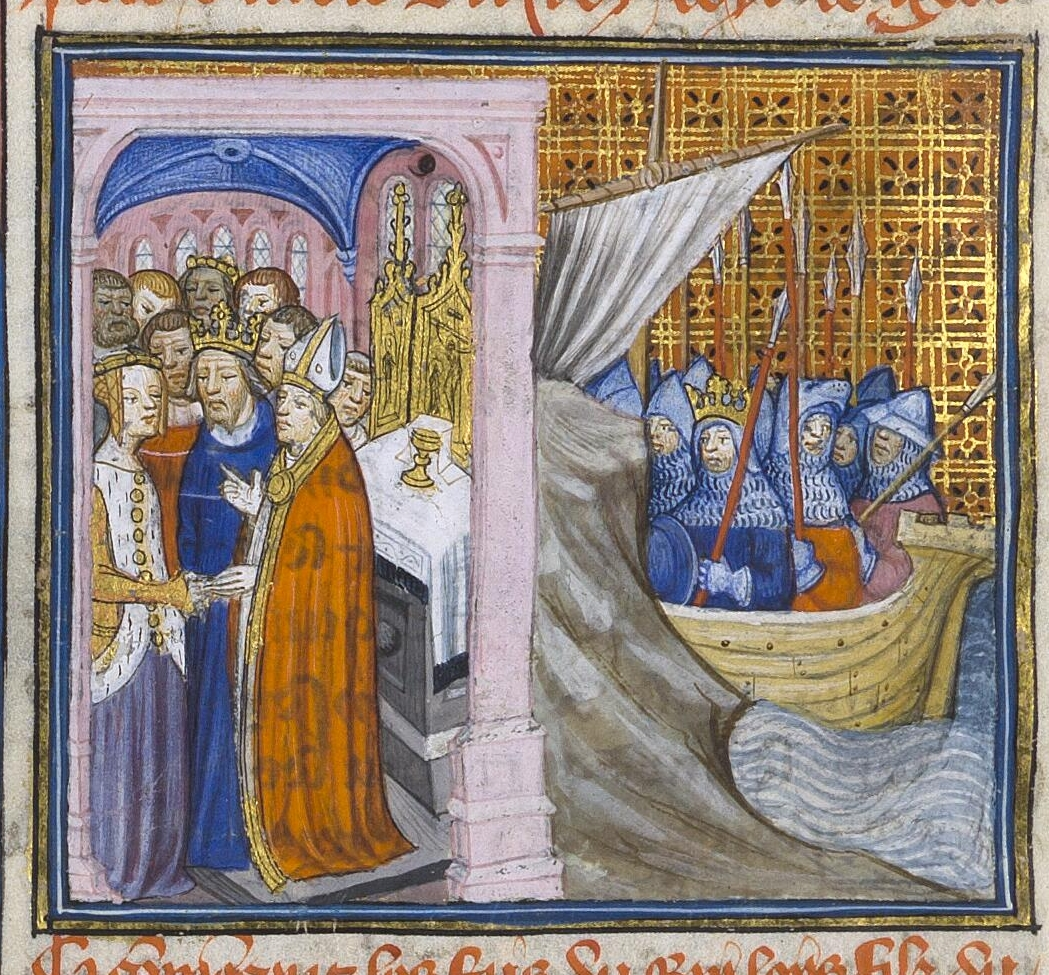
The wedding of Louis VII of France and Eleanor of Aquitaine (1137)

A church of Saint-André was first mentioned in Bordeaux in documents dating from 814, in the Carolingian period. This church was probably part of group of churches, including the Basilica of Saint Severinus of Bordeaux and Notre-Dame-de-la-Place, located in the old castrum or Roman fortified town. It appears more officially in 1096 in a document from the chancellery of Duke William IX of Aquitaine. In that year it was formally consecrated by Pope Urban II.

In the 11th and 12th centuries, the Romanesque church was engaged in long competition with its neighbouring church, Saint Sevrinus of Bordeaux, to attract pilgrims taking part in the Pilgrimage to Saint-Jacques de Compostelle. Saint Severinus had what Bordeaux Cathedral did not, the remains of the companions of Saint Jacques, as well as the oliphant or hunting horn of Roland, a relic placed there by Charlemagne. However, Saint André gradually gained influence and became the leading church of Aquitaine. Until this time it was under the jurisdiction of the Archbishop of Bourges Cathedral, but under Pope Clement IV Saint-André began reporting directly to Rome. It also took jurisdiction over churches in Agen, Périgueux, Angoulême and Saintes.

On the 25 of July, 1137, the 13-year-old Eleanor of Aquitaine married the future Louis VII of France, in the cathedral. A week later the King's father died, and Eleanor became the Queen of France. This marriage was cancelled in 1152. That same year she married the future Henry II, and became Queen of England in 1154. She is the mother of King Richard the Lionheart and King John of England.

The Romanesque church had been begun sometime before 1170, atop masonry from the earlier Carolingian church. It nave seems to have had three rectangular traverses, and an asymmetric transept, with a plan of adding several cupolas, similar to the church of St. Maurice in Angers. However, at the beginning of the 13th century it was decided to continue building the cathedral following the new Gothic style that had appeared at the end of the 12th century in the Ile-de-France. The old sanctuary was gradually demolished. Of the Romanesque church, only a wall in the nave remains.

=== The Gothic cathedral (14th–15th centuries) ===
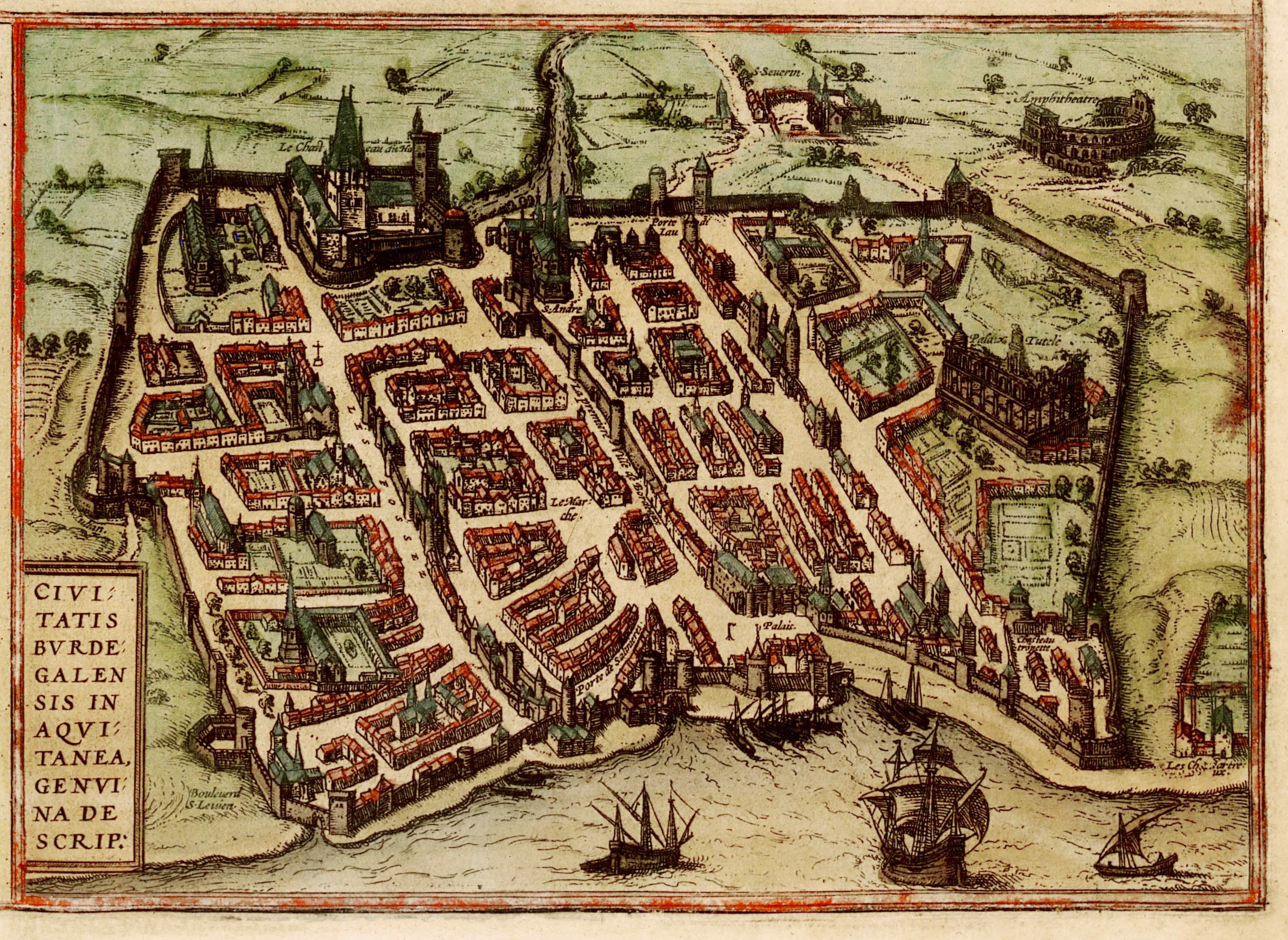
Map of Bordeaux in the 14th century, with cathedral at top left center, next to the larger rival Basilica of Saint Severinus of Bordeaux

The transformation from Romanesque to the French Gothic architecture took place during a long period when Aquitaine and Bordeaux were under the control of the English. It was assisted by the support of the archbishop of Bordeaux, Bertrand de Goth, who from 1305 until 1314 reigned over the Catholic church as Pope Clement V, and directed numerous donations and concessions to the new cathedral.

The choir of the new cathedral was still under construction in 1320, when Bertrand Deschamps became the master builder. Construction of the nave was greatly delayed by the outbreak of the Hundred Years' War in 1337 between England and the Valois kings of the Kingdom of France. The plan of the nave was reduced in scale from three aisles to a single aisle. Work continued principally on the decor. The construction of the bell tower, separate from the main building, began in 1440, but was not finished until 1500. Following an earthquake in 1427 that caused the collapse of parts of the city ramparts, flying buttresses were added to the outside of the nave under master builder Imbert Boachon.

=== Renaissance and Revolution (16th–18th centuries) ===
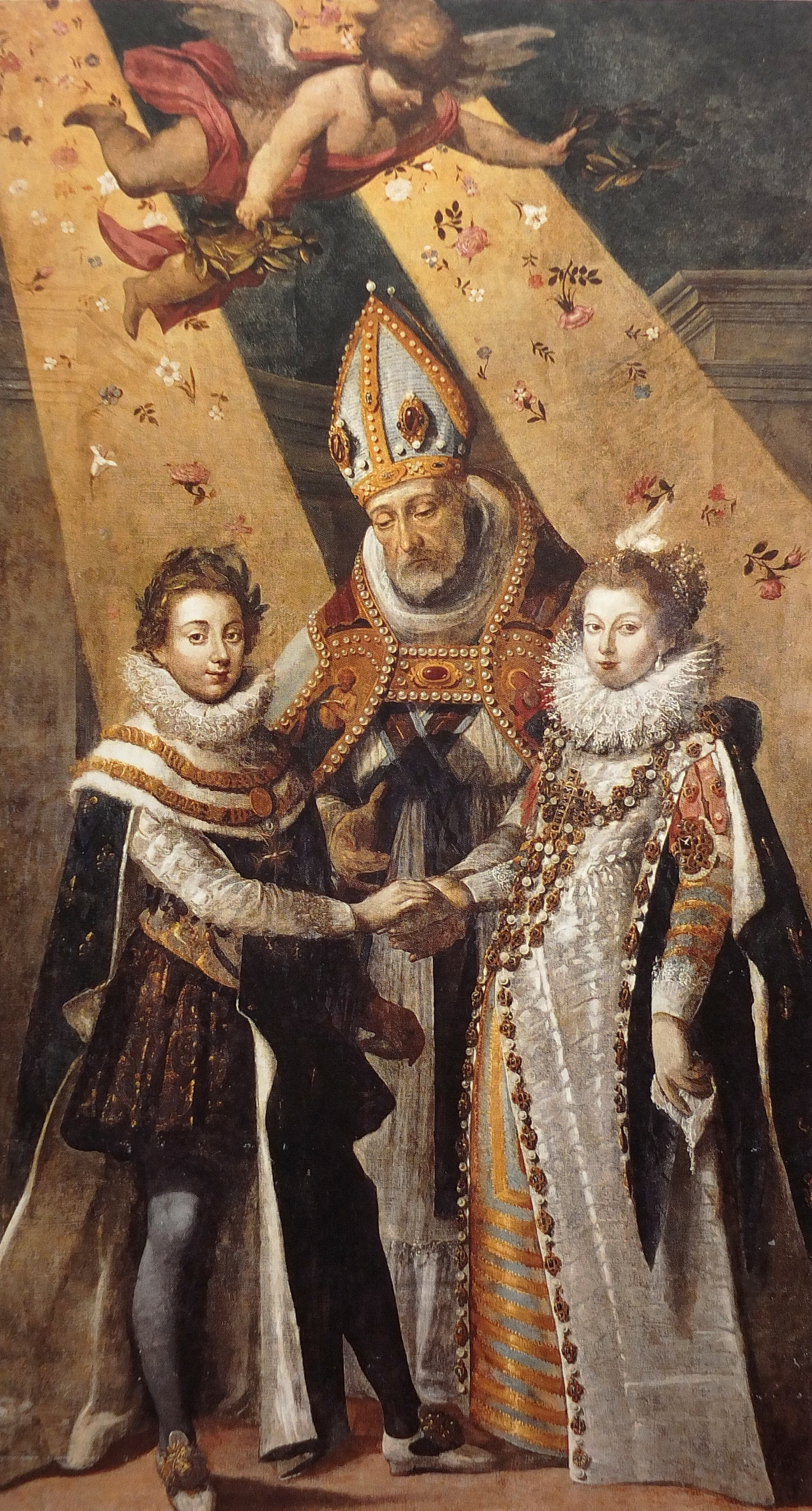
The wedding of Louis XIII and Anne of Austria (1615)

In the 16th century, Renaissance decorative elements were added to the Gothic structure, including an ornamental jubé or rood screen between the choir and the nave. It was taken down in 1806, but elements of it can now be seen on the tribune of the organ. The seventeenth century saw the reconstruction of the spires, but few changes in the interior. Between 1772 and 1784, under Cardinal de Rohan, the archbishop proposed giving the archbishop's palace classical facade. A fire in 1787 caused serious damage to the roof of the choir and transept.

The royal wedding of Louis XIII and Anne of Austria, the daughter of King Philip III of Spain and Archduchess of Austria, took place in the cathedral in 1615, cementing alliance between Spain, Austria and France. It led in 1638 to the birth of Louis XIV.

During the French Revolution, the furniture and much of the decoration of the cathedral was removed or vandalised. A portion of the exterior sculpture, on the north side, was hidden by the neighbouring buildings, and was spared. In March 1793 the building was officially nationalised, and transformed into a storage barn for the feed of military horses. The nave was used in 1797 for political meetings and patriotic assemblies. The tower was threatened with destruction, and most of the furniture was gone when the building was finally returned to the church in 1798.

=== 19th–20th centuries ===
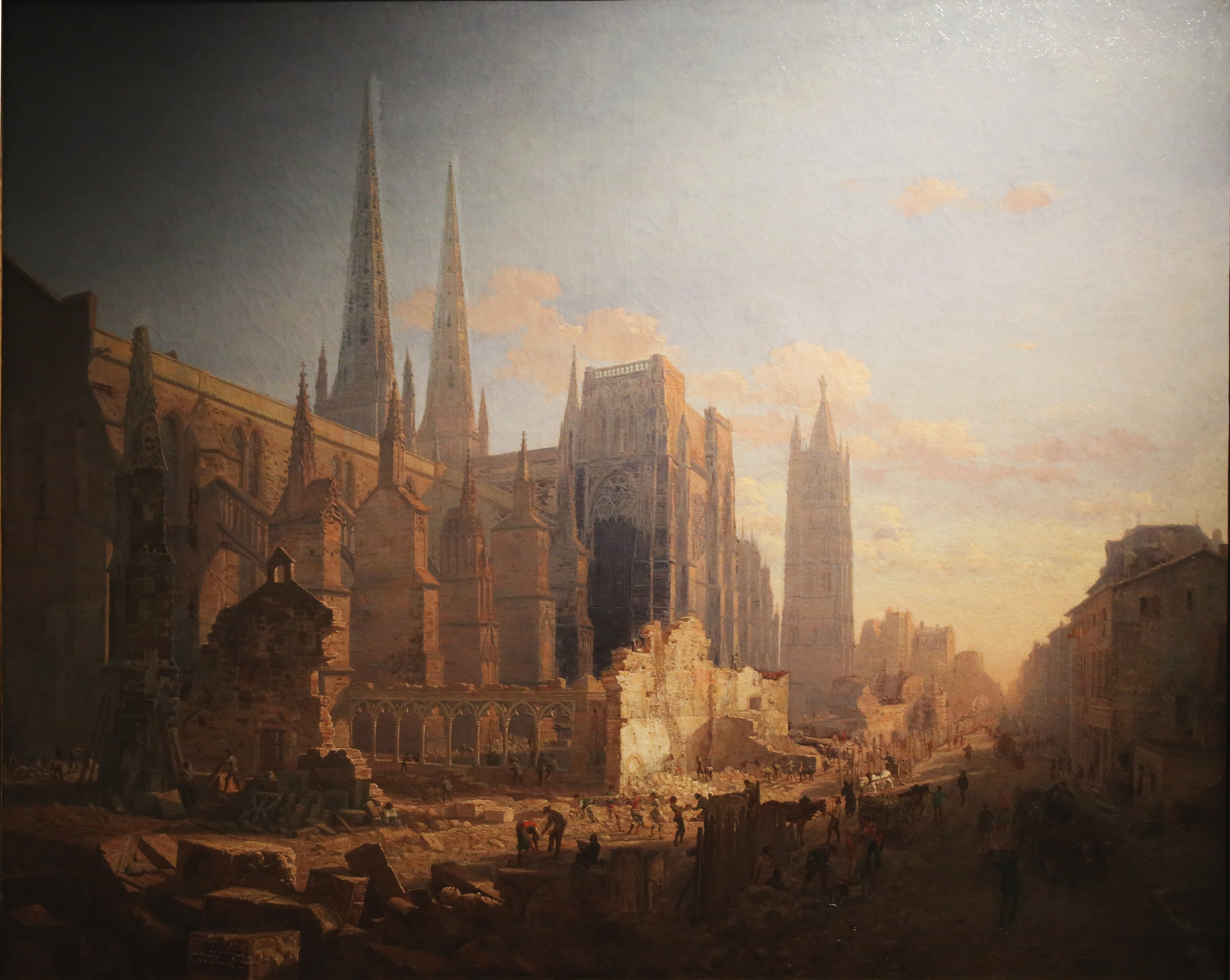
The cathedral in 1865, as the old constructions to the north were removed

A long series of renovations and reconstructions began in 1803 and continued throughout the century. The most ambitious reconstructions were carried out by Paul Abadie, best known as the architect of the Basilica of Sacré-Cœur in Paris, and a student of Eugène Viollet-le-Duc. The later constructions in front of the north side of the nave in Bordeaux were removed in 1866, making that part of the cathedral more visible. In 1862 Abadie proposed to build new sacristies to replace the old cloister, much larger than the original sacristies. Abadie's plan was opposed by the Bordeaux archeologist Leo Drouyn, who felt that Abadie's changes were based more on Abadie's imagination of the Gothic style than the historic reality of the original building. Drouyn insisted on a more strict recreation of the medieval Bordeaux style. In the end, however, the version of Abadie prevailed.

Restoration and reconstruction continued throughout the 20th century. The west vaults of the nave were strengthened between 1907 and 1909; the west spire of the north transept in 1943, and the east tower in 1958. The roofs of the ambulatory and chapels were finished in 1990, followed by work on the northwest chapel, the sacristy, and axis chapel, and the facades of the transept. In 1997–98, the north portal walls were cleaned of centuries of grime and soot with lasers.

== Exterior ==
=== North transept and the royal portal ===
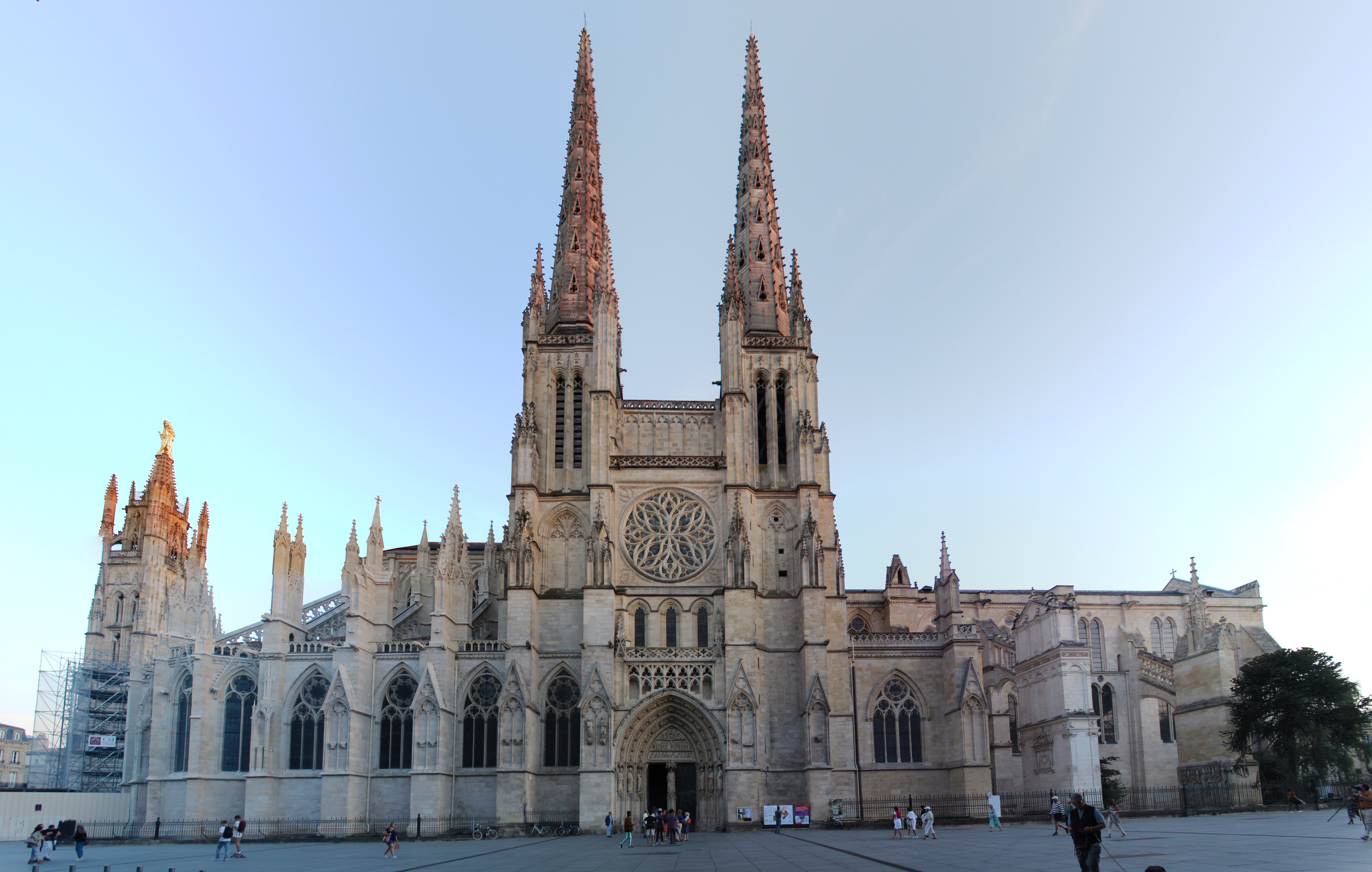
North side and the north portal

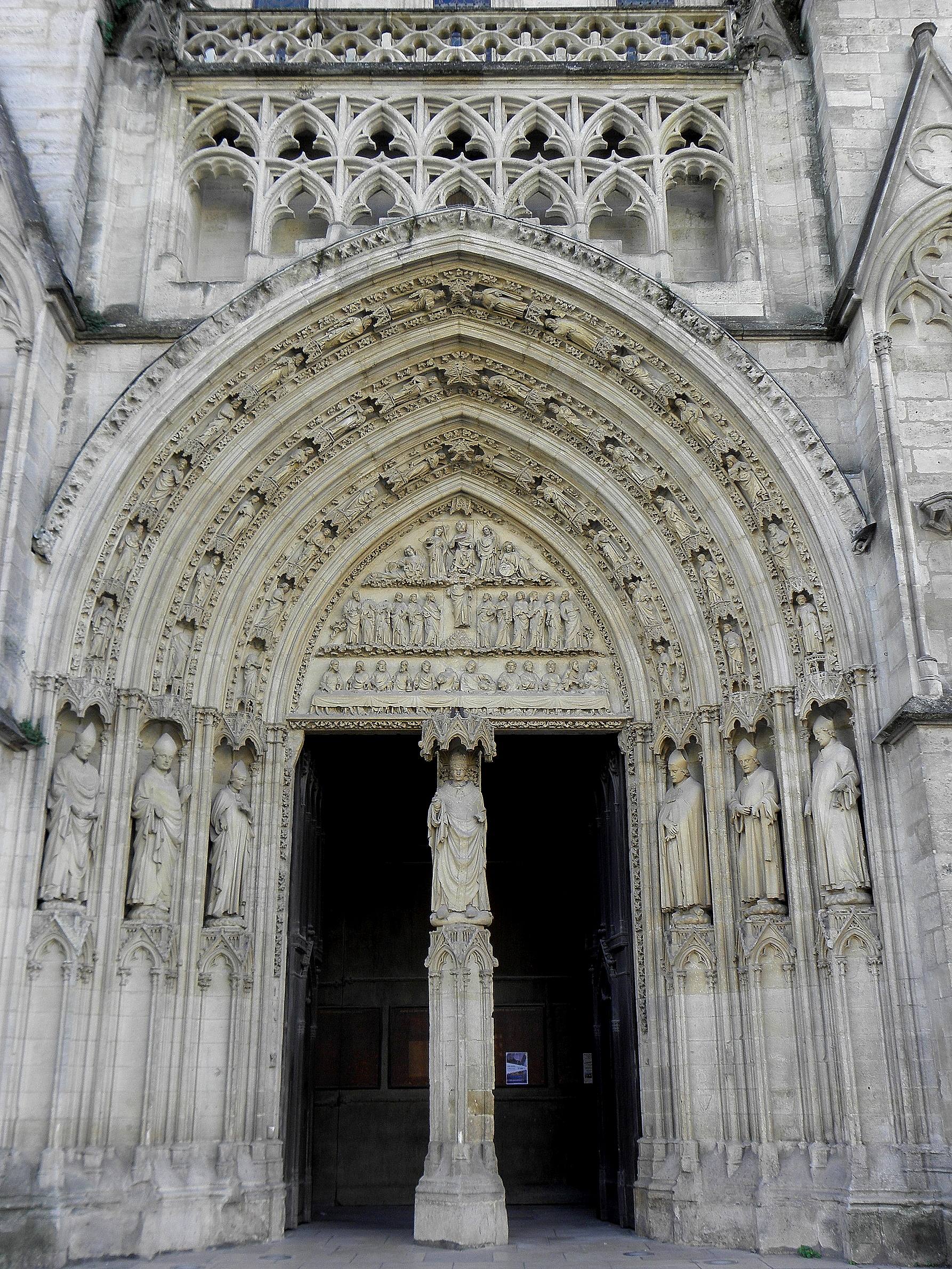
The north portal

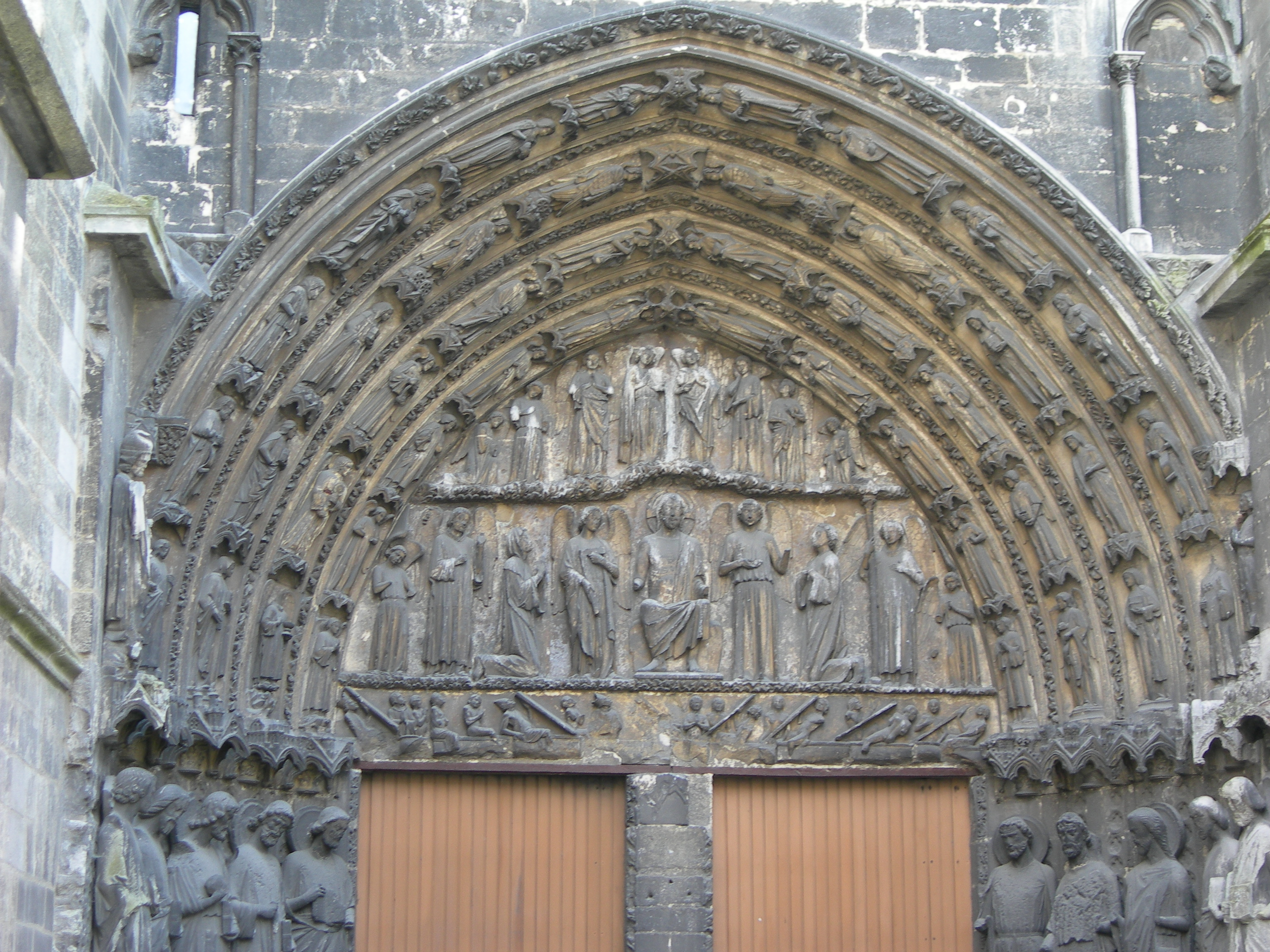
Tympanum and voussoirs of the royal portal (1200–1250)

The north portal of the cathedral, which enters the north transept, is known as the portal of spires and was considered the most prestigious entrance. It dates to about 1325–1350. The two spires on the towers were reconstructed several times; 1665 and 1952 for the west spire, and 1958 for the east spire.

To the west of the north portal, the bays date to around 1210; to the east, in the second half of the 13th century. The north side of the cathedral nave has foundations twelve meters wide and reaching six meters underground to the bedrock beneath. Despite this, the north walls of this part of the cathedral have had a history of stability problems, and have required the construction of additional flying buttresses over the years. The largest of these, called the Gramont buttress after archbishop Gabriel Gramont and his successor Charles Gramont, was begun in 1531 and is a monument in itself. It has the flying arches of a Gothic buttress, but is covered with has lavish Renaissance decoration, including a host of small putti, or angels, and carved inscriptions describing the Biblical Day of Judgement.

Another feature of the north front is the royal portal, which is located between the Gramont buttress and the sacristy. This doorway opened into the transept and choir and served as the main entrance to the cathedral until the 1320s when the north portal was opened.

The sculpture of the tympanum of the royal portal was made in between 1200 and 1250 and is considered some of the oldest and best of the cathedral. It was spared destruction because the portal at the time of the Revolution was hidden by other structures. The sculpture of this tympanum was used as a model for the recreation of the tympanum of the central portal of Notre Dame de Paris in the 19th century, which had been destroyed during the Revolution, and which dated from the same period.

=== South transept and south side ===
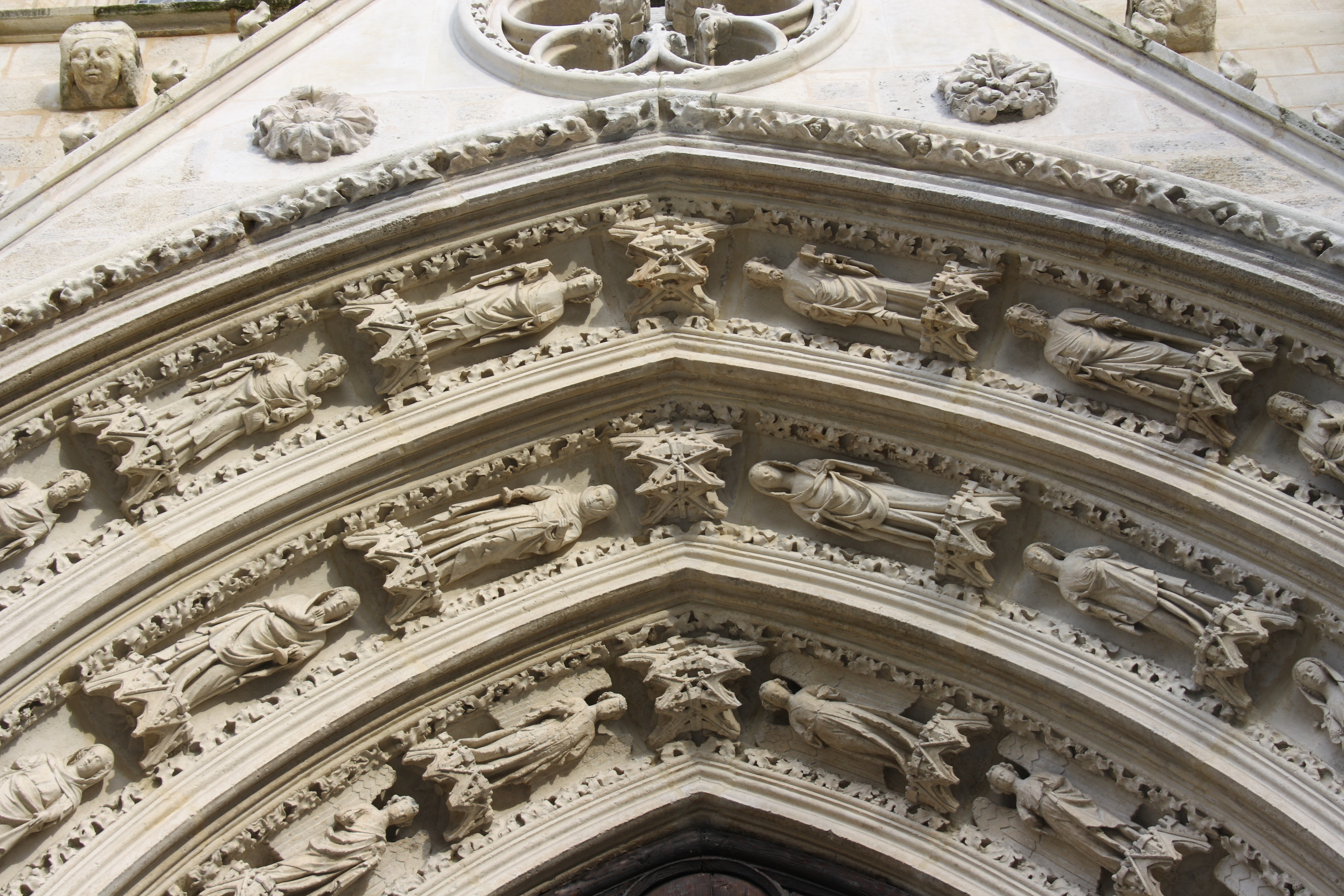
Surviving sculpture in south voussoirs

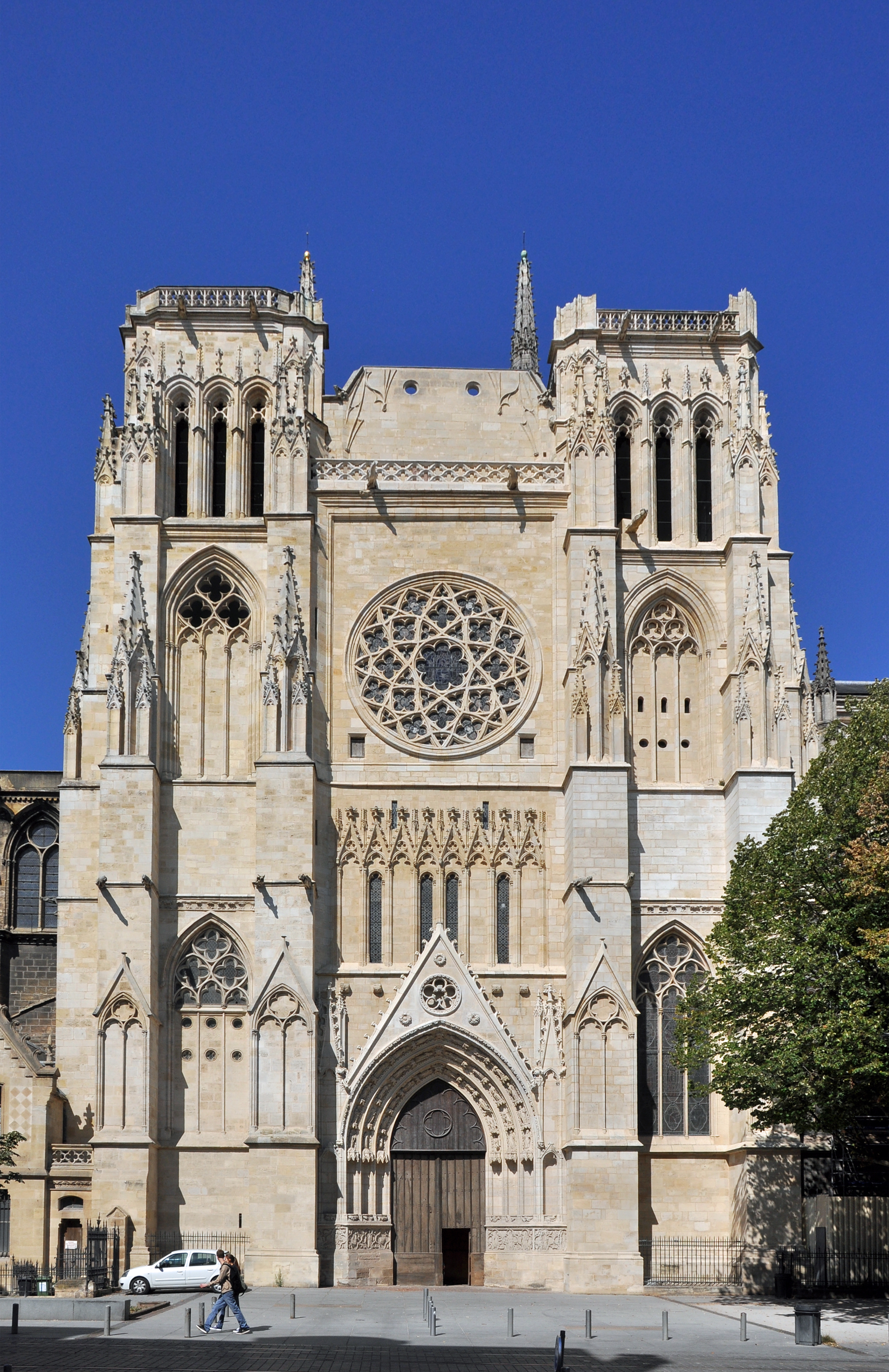
South front and towers, with the cathedral bells

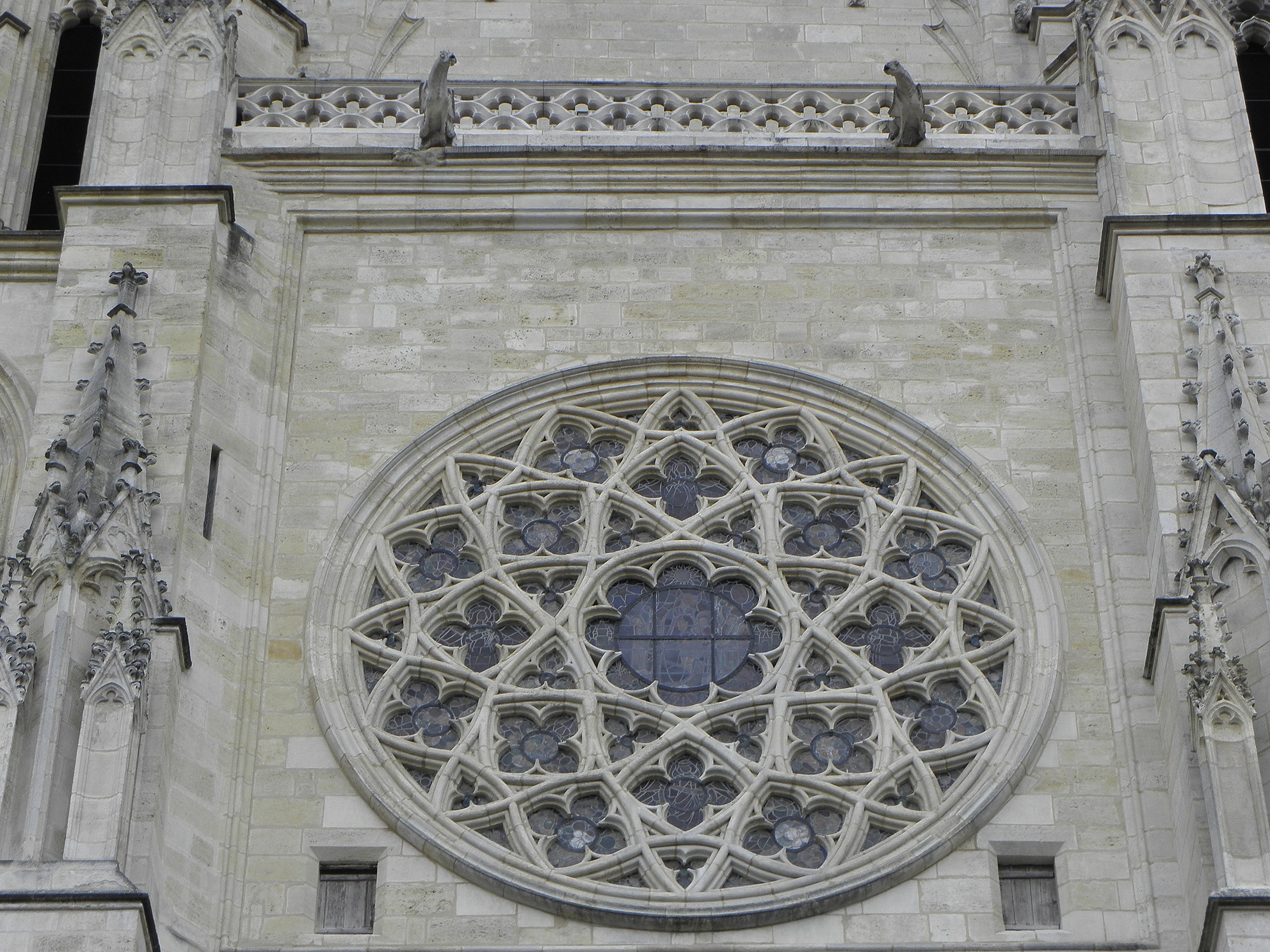
South rose window

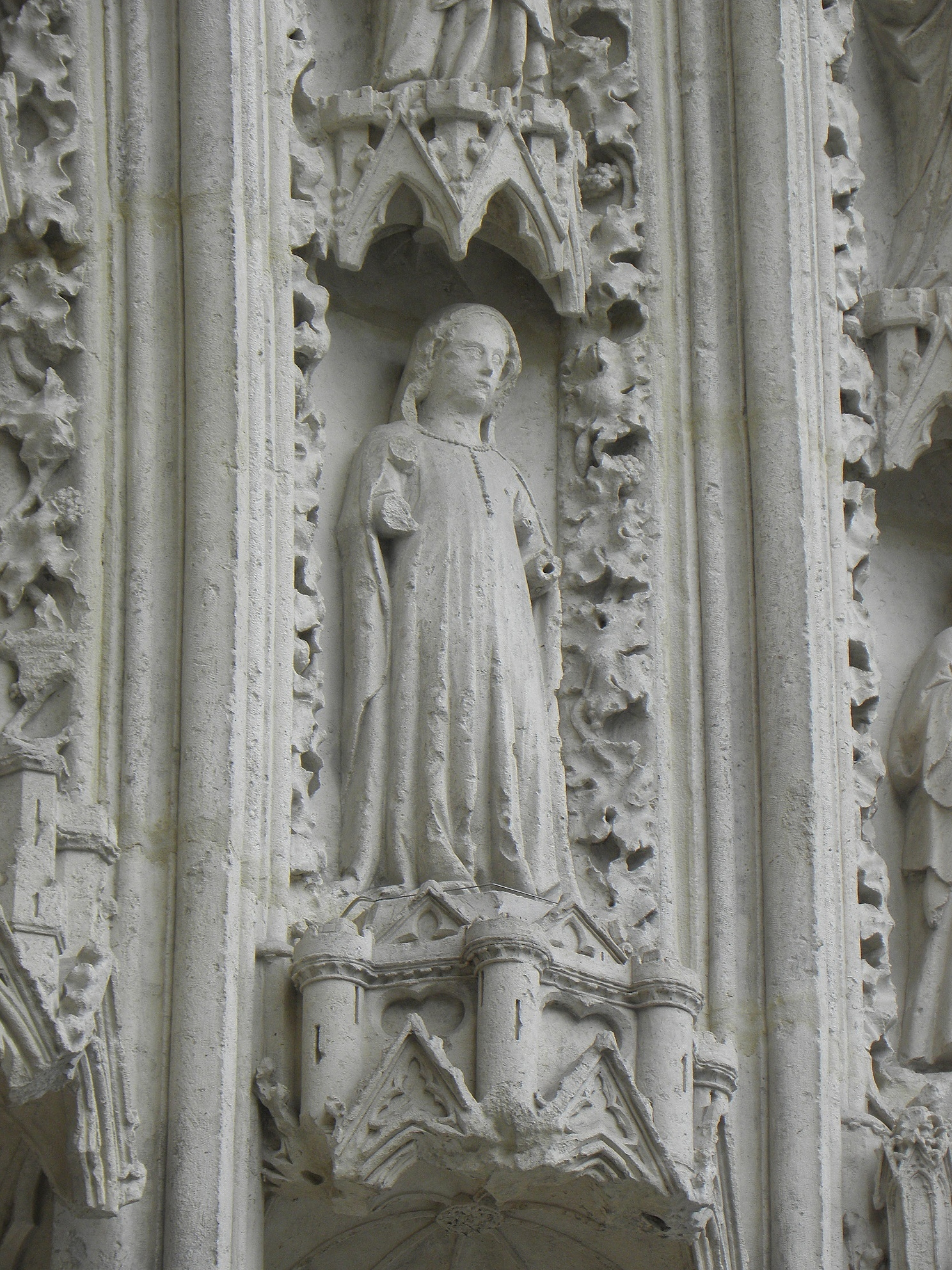
Surviving sculpture of the south voussoirs

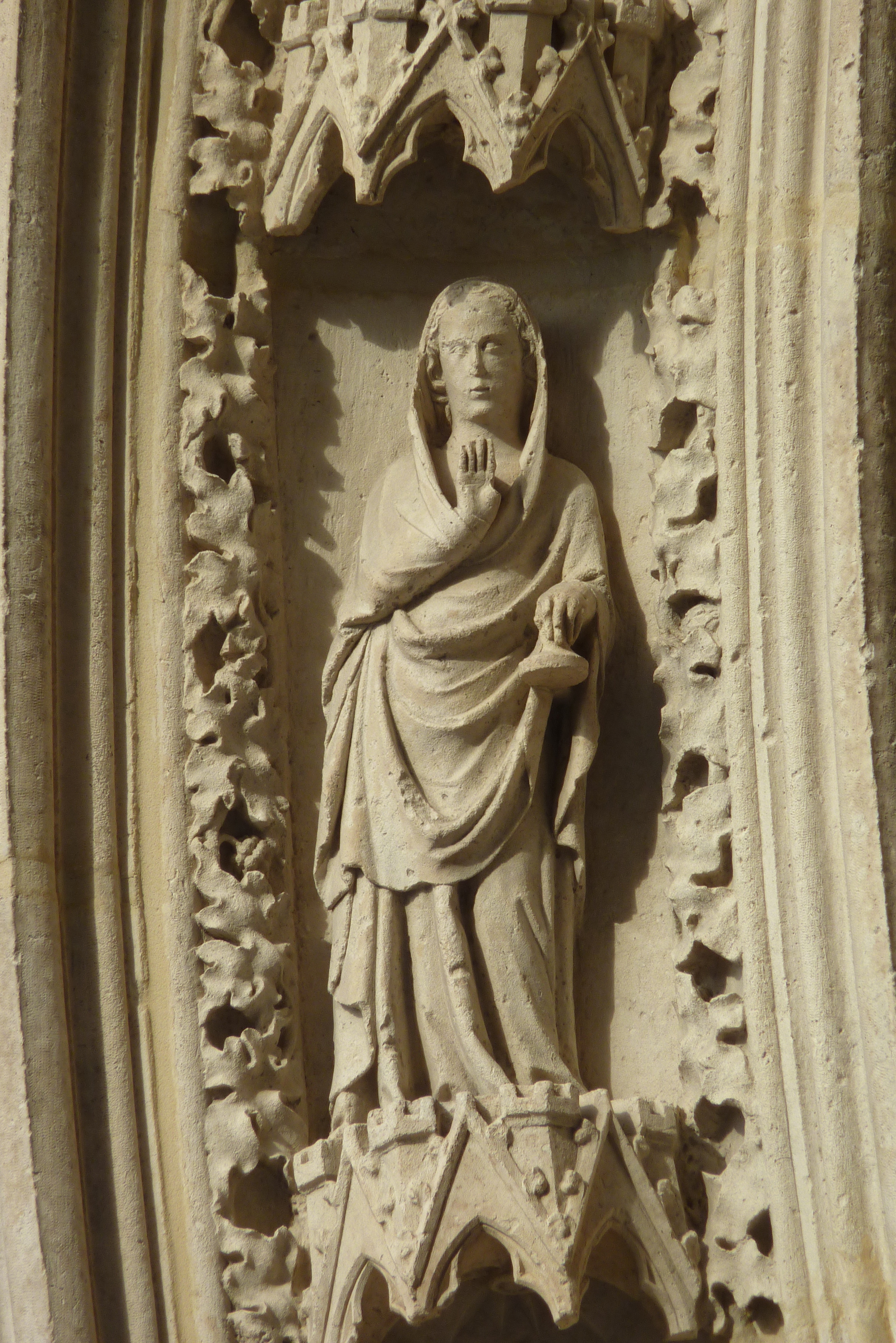
Surviving sculpture in south voussoirs (14th century)

The south front of the transept is flanked by two towers which were built to contain the Cathedrals' bells. They were originally intended to have spires, which were never built.

The lower portions below the rose window date to the early 14th century, and are older than the north transept. However, most all of the original sculptural decoration was destroyed during the Revolution. Portions of The tympanum and the trumeau of the south portal were destroyed in 1794 to allow wagons carrying supplies to pass through the portal. Some sculptures in the voussoirs did survive; it is now attributed to a Toulouse sculptor of the 14th century, Petrus de Sancto Milio, the leader of the prominent school of sculpture of southern France and northern Spain.

=== West front ===
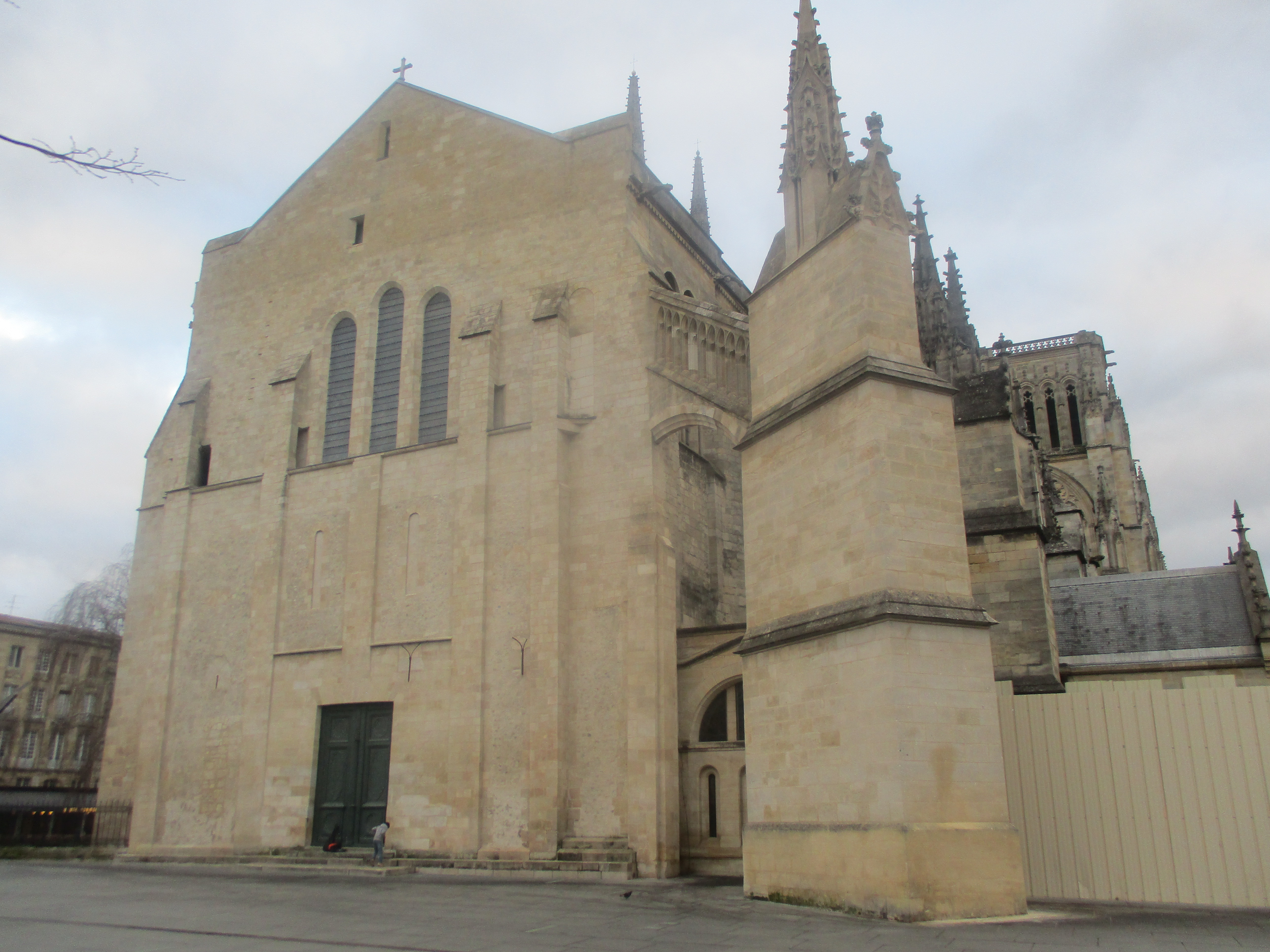
The west front, with its massive buttresses

The west front of Bordeaux Cathedral, unlike the west fronts of most other Gothic cathedrals, is entirely without decoration. It was concealed by other buildings until 1772 when the other structures were demolished. The doorway is also a late addition, made in 1805. Excavations in 1954 showed that the bare wall was part of the original Romanesque nave built in the 11th century, which was raised in height and widened in the 12th and 13th centuries. The early buttresses are still in place.

A prominent feature of the south side is the row of buildings with neo-Gothic facades called the New Sacristies, which are placed against the south wall between the buttresses. They contain the baptismal chapel, the sacristies, a chapel for catechisms, a chapter house, a bedroom for the bishop, and other functional spaces. These were constructed in 1869 and 1879 by the 19th-century architect Paul Abadie in the place of the medieval cloister.

=== Choir and chevet ===
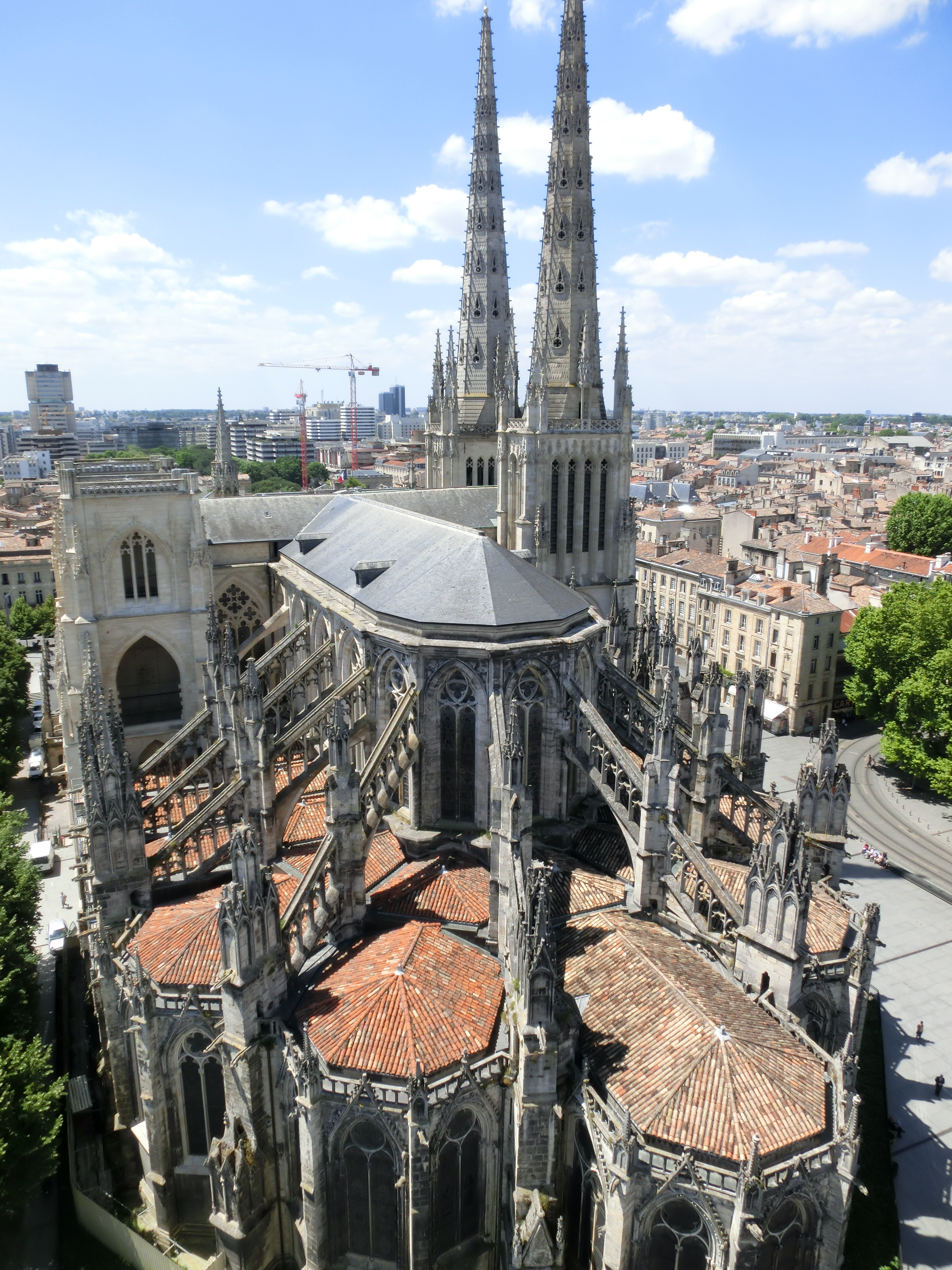
The chevet seen from the Pey-Berland tower

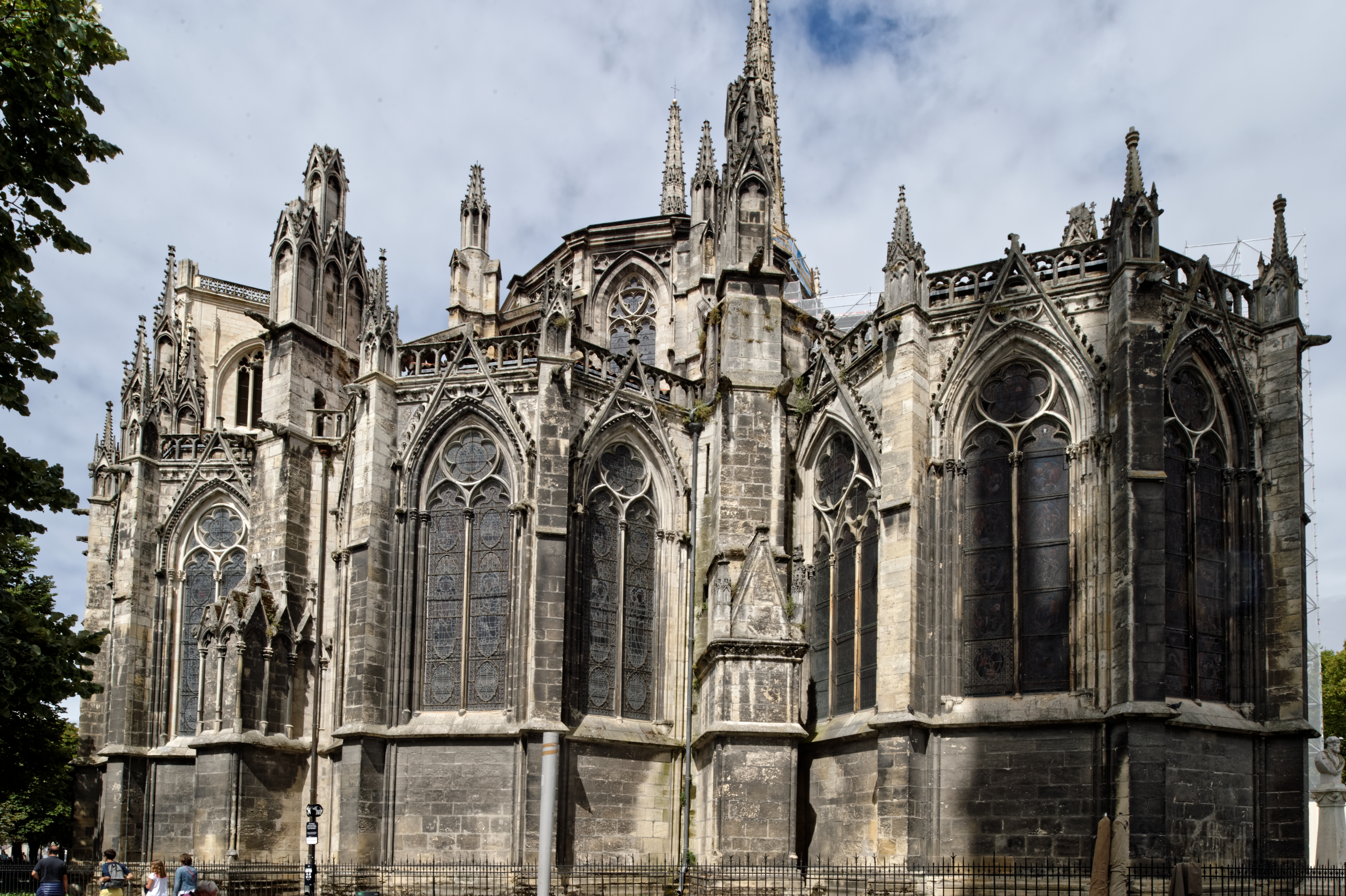
The chevet with its radiating chapels

The choir and chevet are traditionally at the east of the cathedral, facing the sunrise. At Bordeaux, as in other cathedrals of the period, the chevet is surrounded by radiating chapels. The flying buttresses, between the chapels, reach up to support the upper walls of the choir.

=== Pey-Berland Tower ===
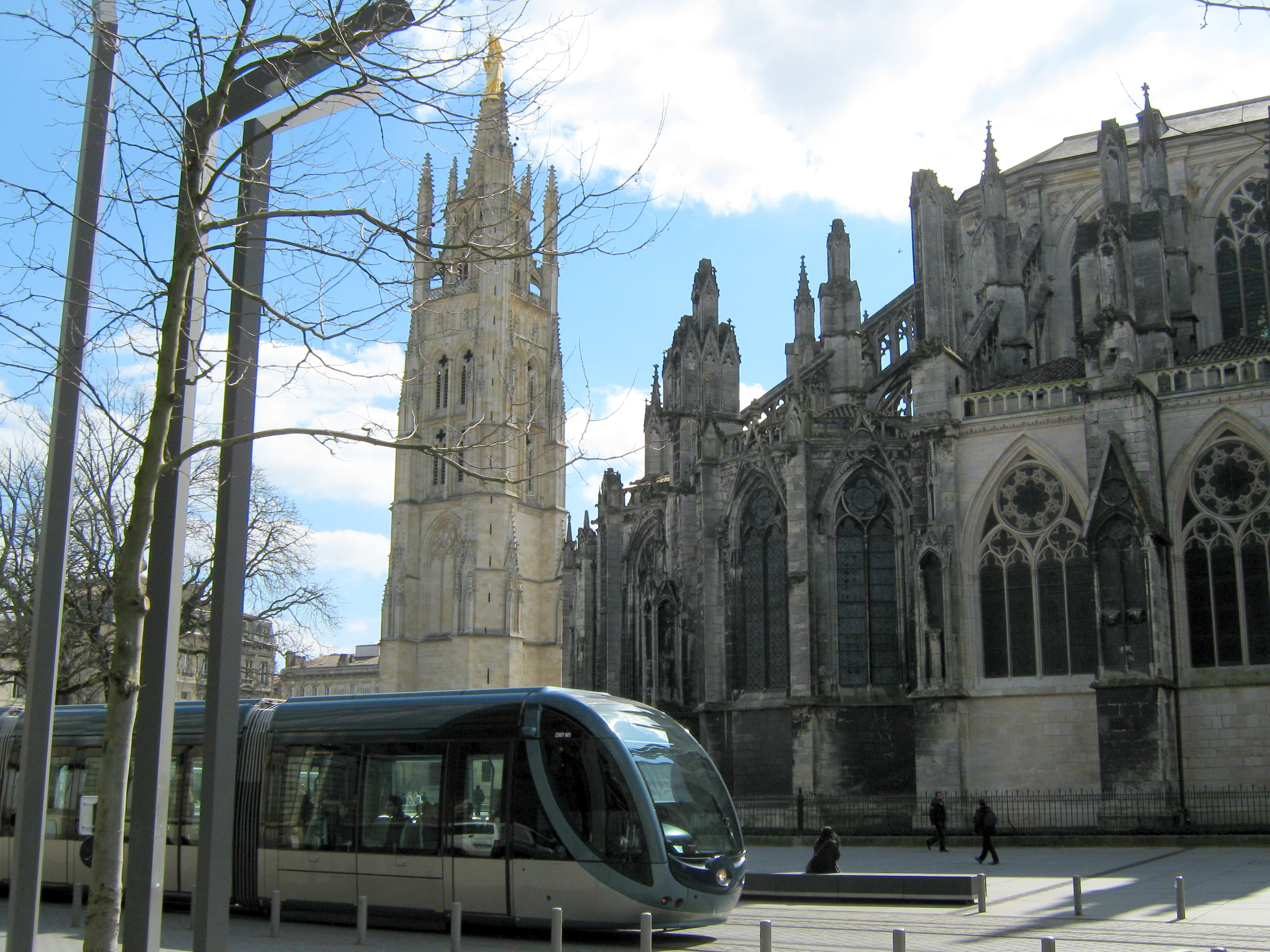
The tower and the cathedral

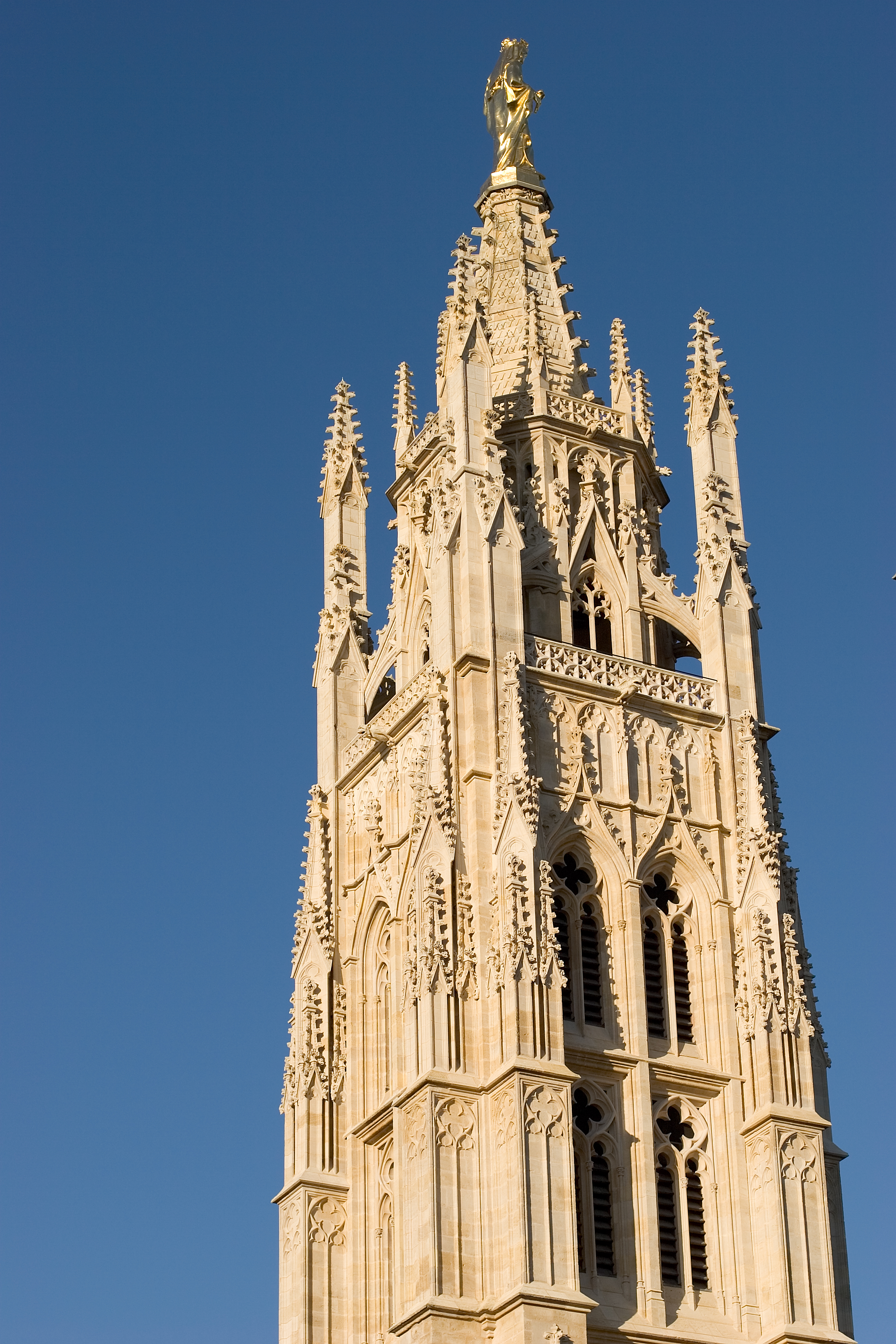
The Pey-Berland tower (15th century)

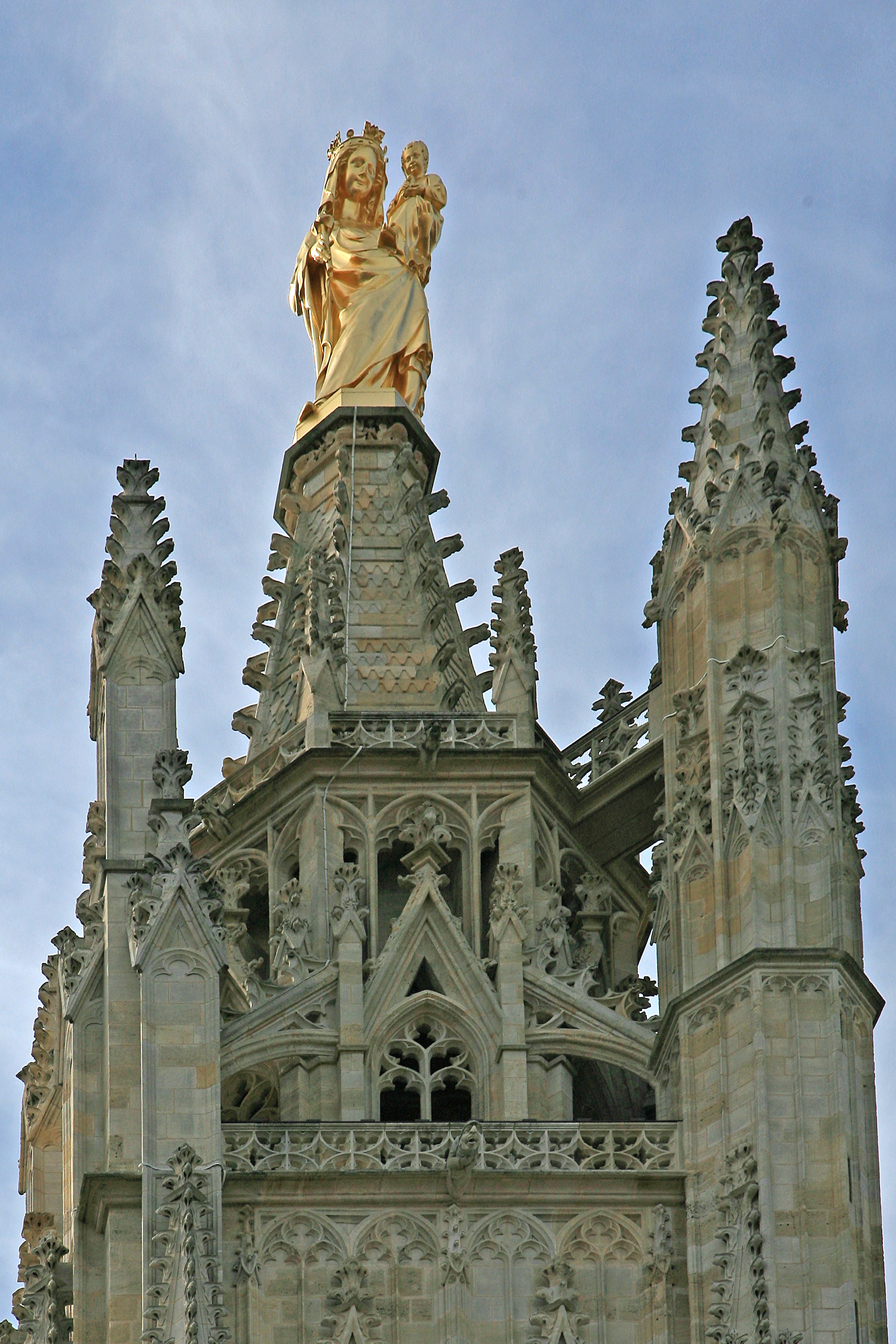
The statue of Our Lady of Aquitaine atop the tower (1863)

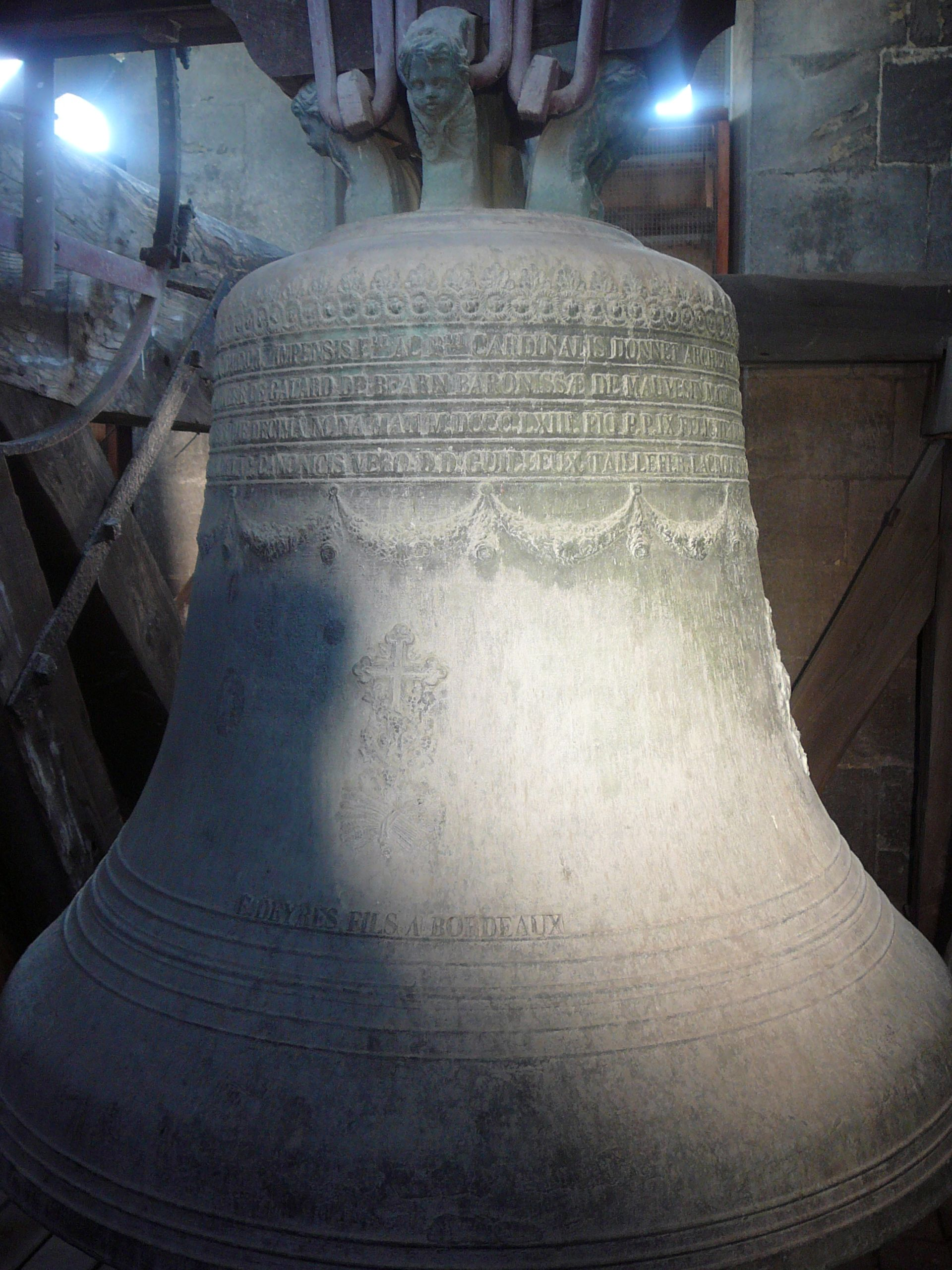
One of the tower bells

The Pey-Berland tower, in the flamboyant Gothic style, was added to the cathedral by Archbishop Pey Berland, who laid the first stone on October 13, 1440. It is located about twenty meters from the chevet of the cathedral. It is slightly over sixty meters high, on a base eight meters on each side. It was intended to have a much higher steeple, but the original stone steeple, 12.5 meters high, was blown down in a hurricane in 1667. The remains of the steeple were taken down during the Revolution, then reconstructed in 1851. The statue of Our Lady of Aquitaine, made of gilded metal by the sculptor Alexandre Chertier, was added in 1863.

== Interior ==
=== Nave ===
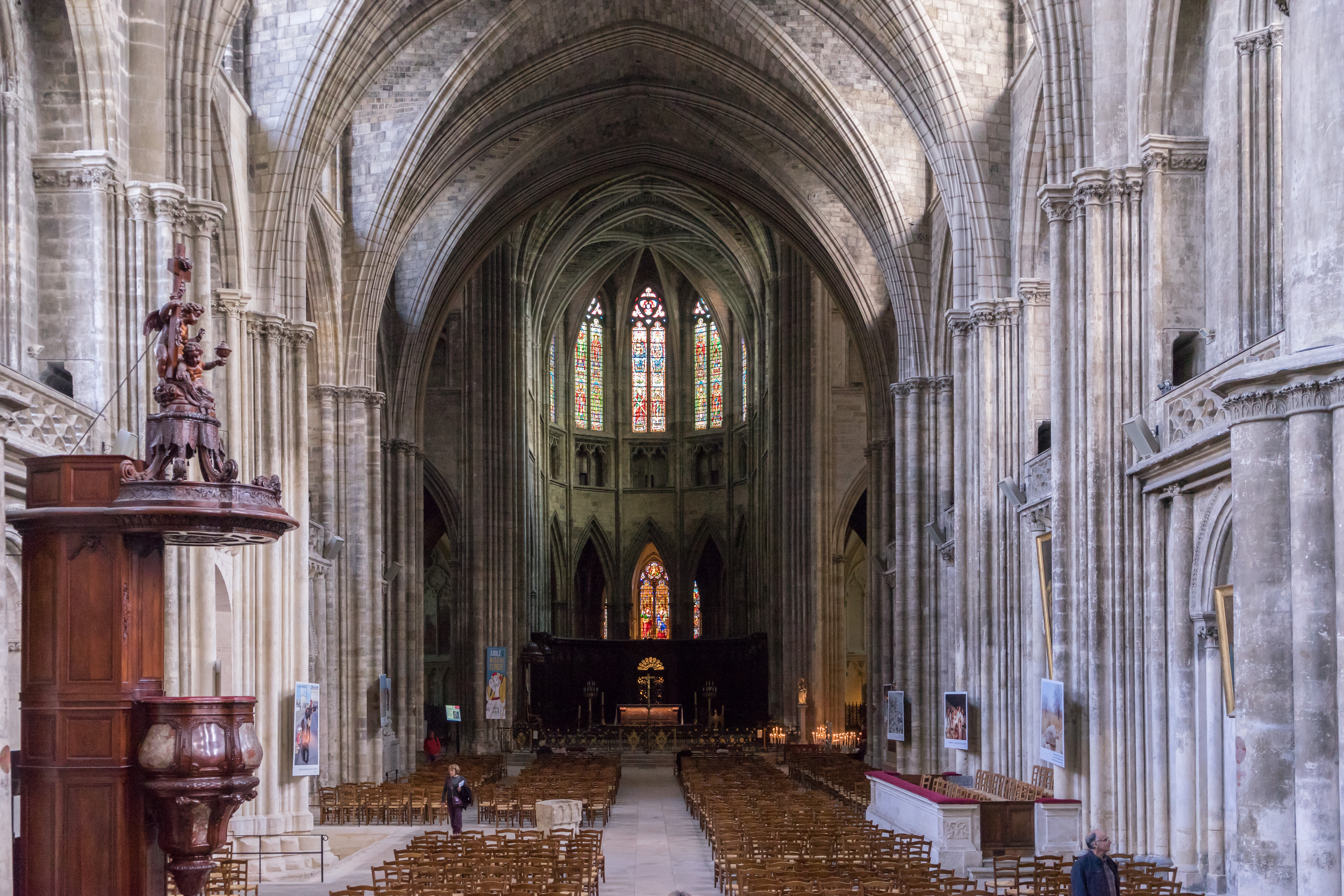
Looking east from the nave to the choir

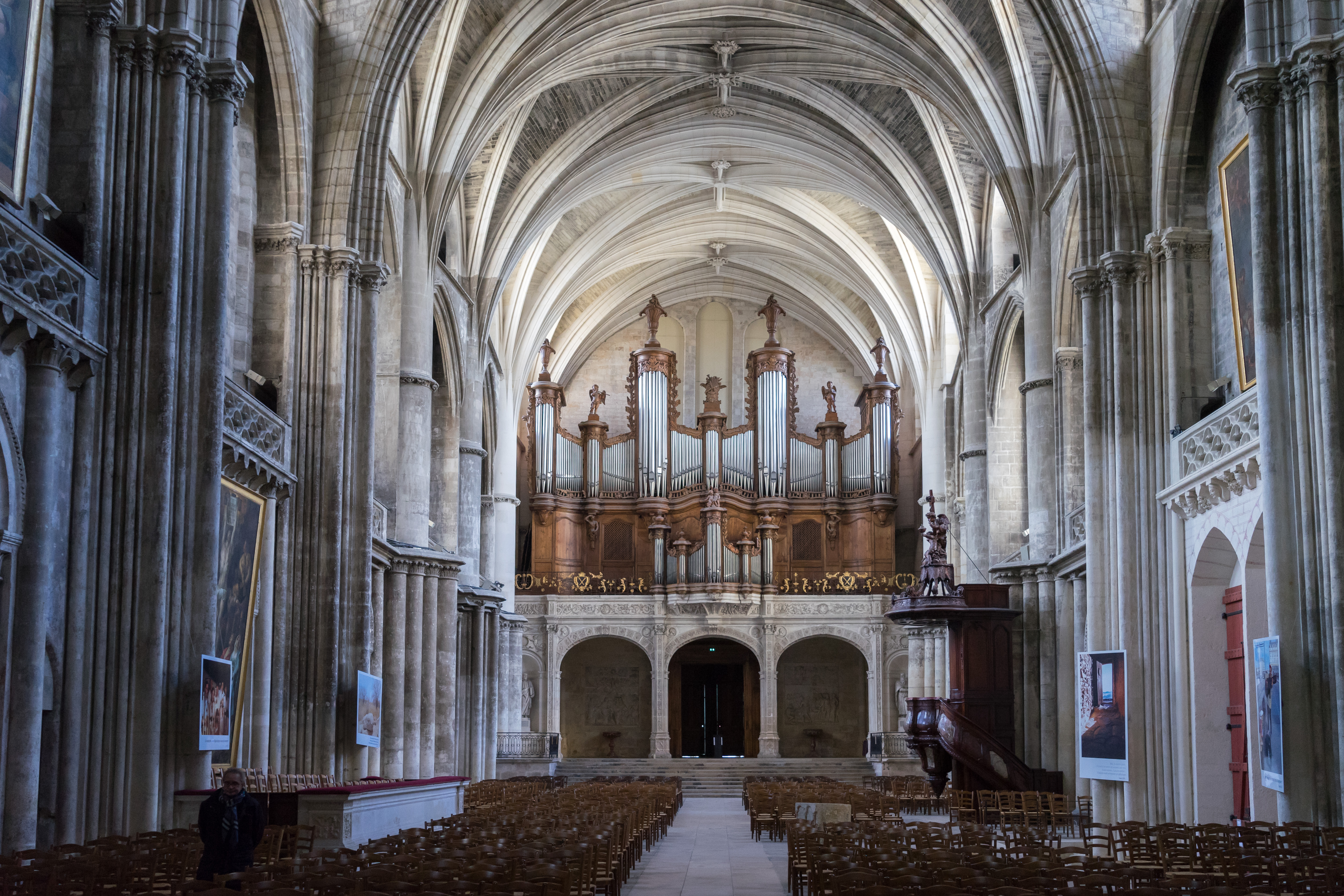
The nave looking west, with its decorative 16th-century lierne vaults and the pulpit on the right

The nave is the portion of the cathedral where the ordinary churchgoers are seated, between the west front and transept. It is considerably narrower than the choir. It was first covered with four-part rib vaults in the first half of the 13th century. In the 16th century, some of the nave traverses were reconstructed with the more ornate lierne vault, which have purely decorative additional ribs. The vaults are further decorated with keystones bearing the arms of the Archbishop Jean de Foix, and carved figures of the patron saint of the cathedral, Saint Andrew.

The elevation is very different from that of the Ile-de-France Gothic churches, due to the reconstructions at different periods in different styles. The north side of the nave has deep niches with windows on the ground floor, while the south side, from the 12th century, flanking the new sacristies, has a largely blank wall. The elevation also is influenced by a tradition of Gothic architecture in western France of creating a "line of domes'; several traverses aligned and covered with domes. In Bordeaux the elevation is composed of groups of three arcades, topped with a narrow passageway cut into the thickness of the wall, and above that the high windows fitting into arched ceiling vaults. The massive clusters of columns that form the piers of the arcades have capitals with vegetal designs.

=== Transept and the choir ===
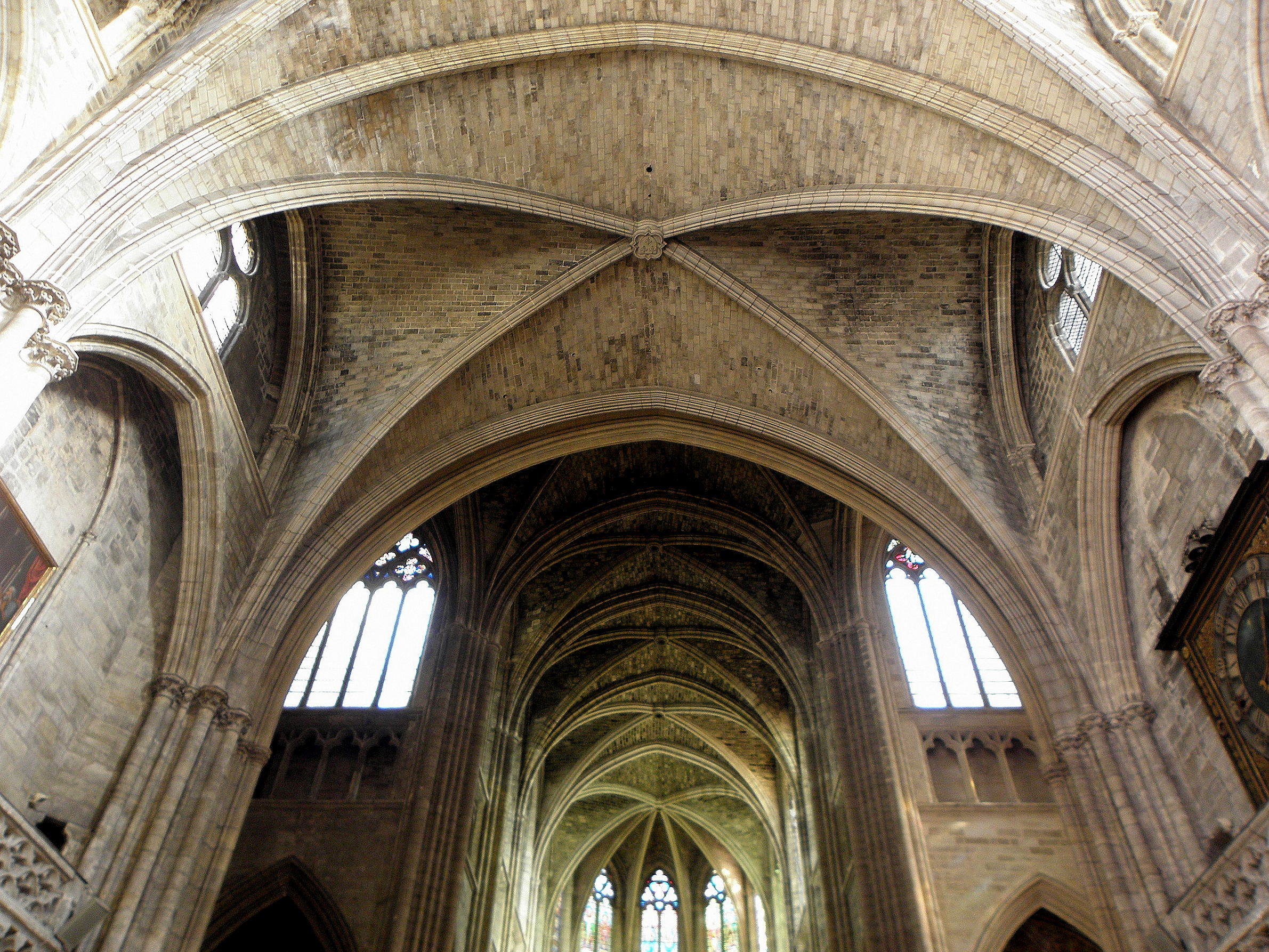
The vaults of the transept and choir

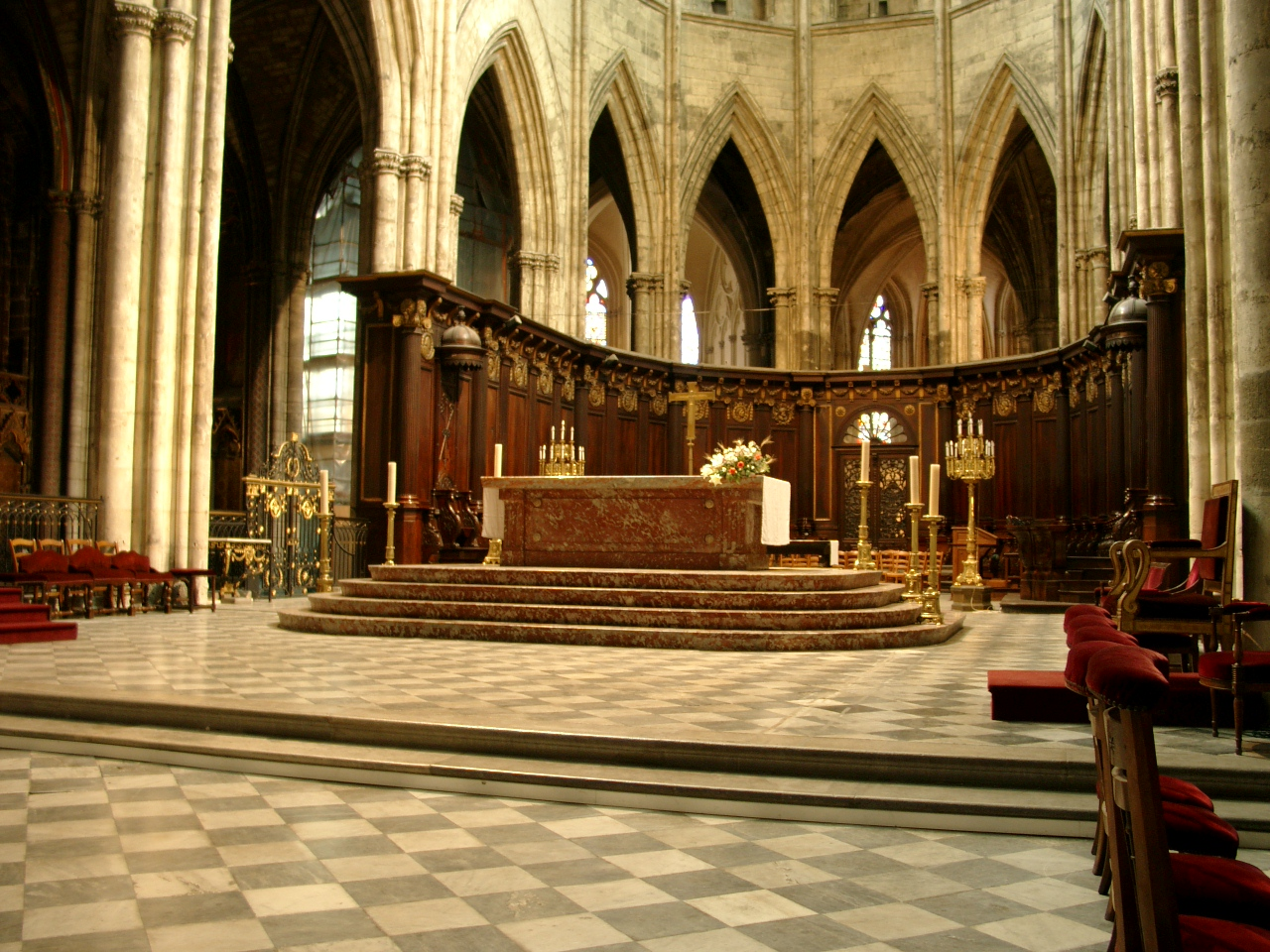
The high altar and choir stalls

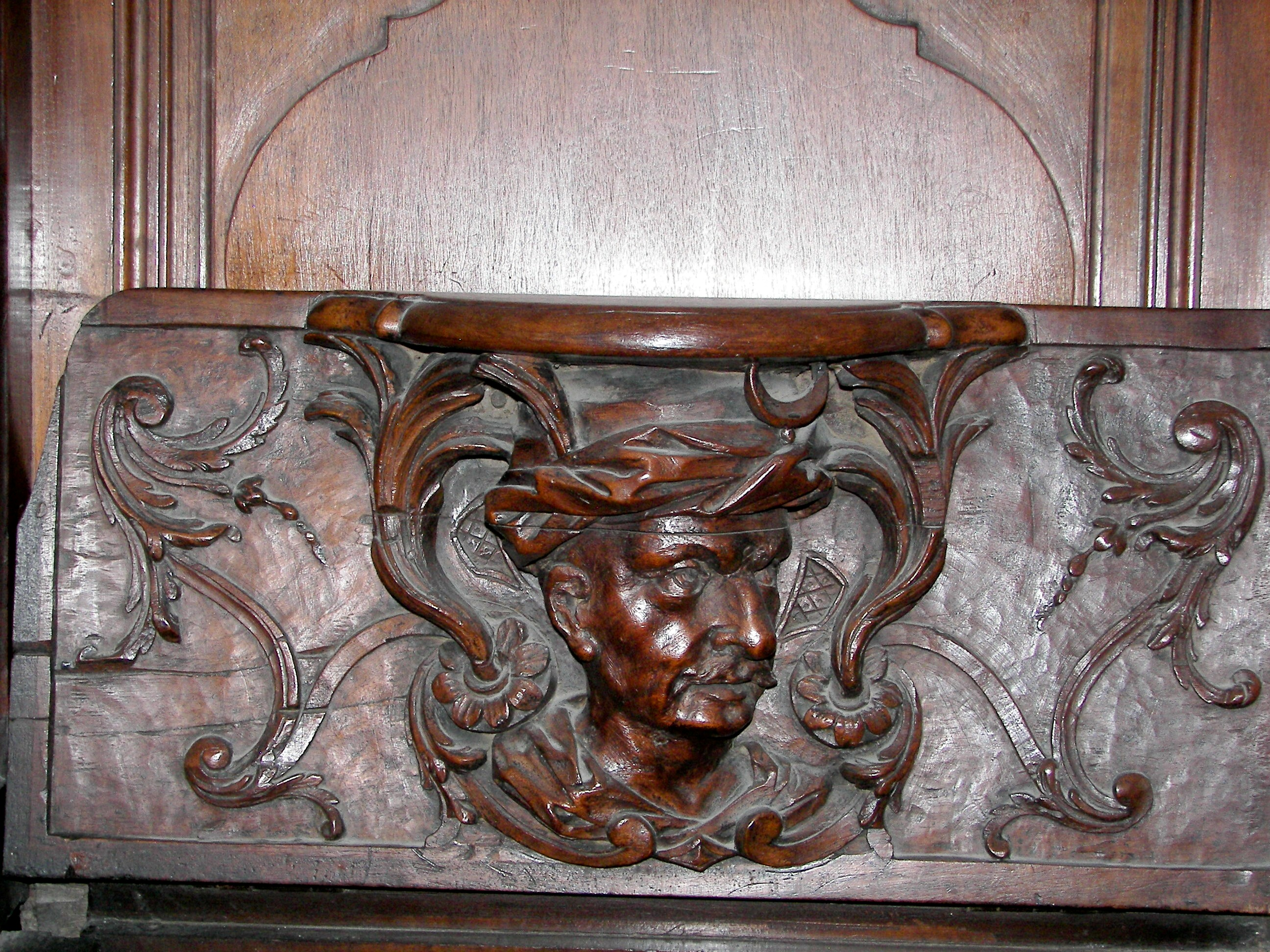
Detail of a misericorde of a choir stall seat

The transept is the meeting point between the nave and the choir, and the traditional site of the main altar. The choir is the portion of the cathedral traditionally reserved for the clergy, where the choir stalls are located. While the nave of Bordeaux cathedral is composed of a mixture of elements of different periods and styles, the choir is rigidly of a single style. Further complicating matters, the choir has a different height and width than the nave, which required considerable architectural finesse to join to the nave.

The carved misericordes in the choir are one of the distinctive artistic features of the cathedral. Each with a different image, they were made so that, when the seat was folded up, and the clergy members had to stand for long periods of time, they could use the misericorde for support.

=== Chapels ===
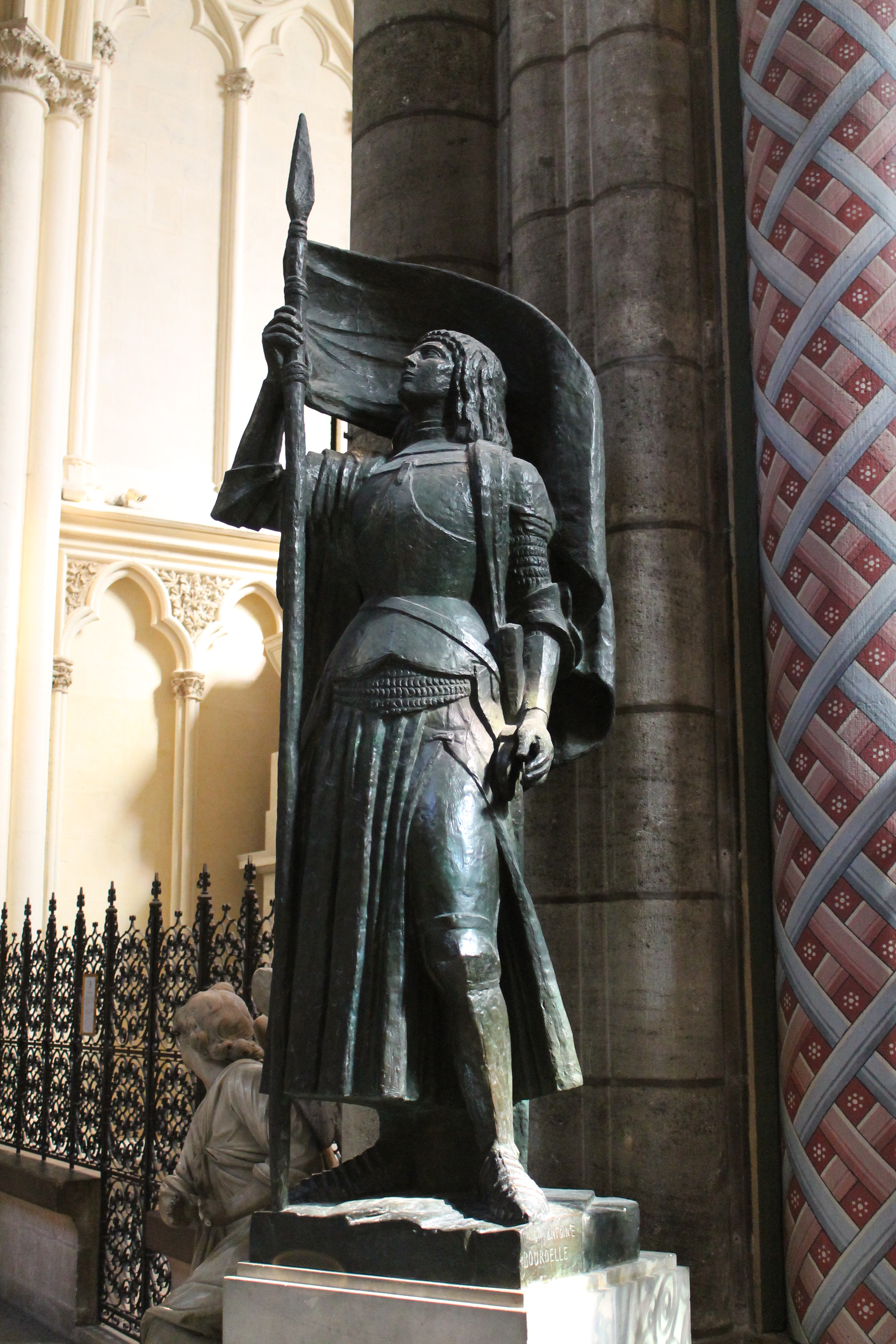
Joan of Arc, by Antoine Bourdelle (19th c.)

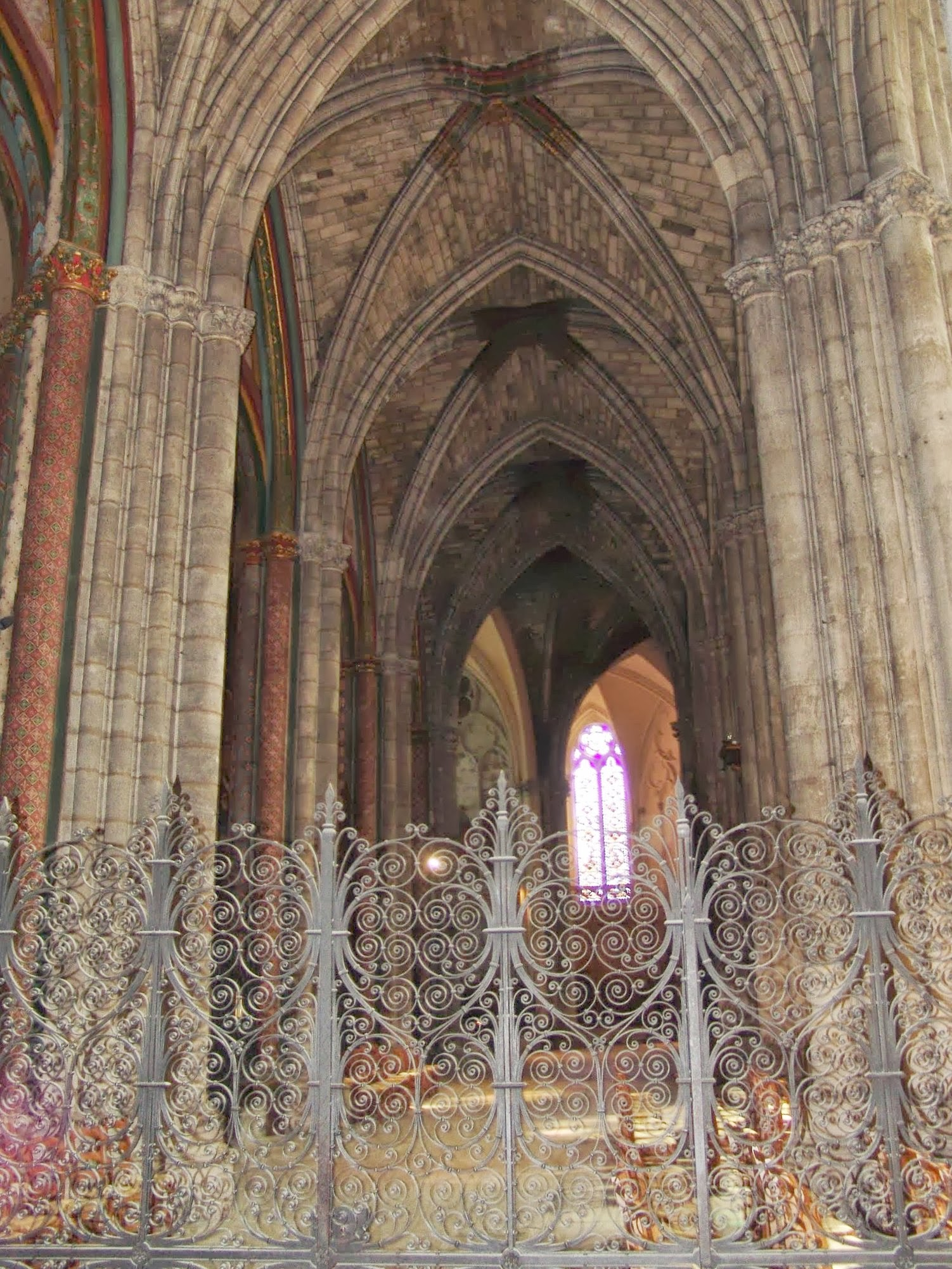
Ambulatory from the choir to the chapels, with ornamental screen

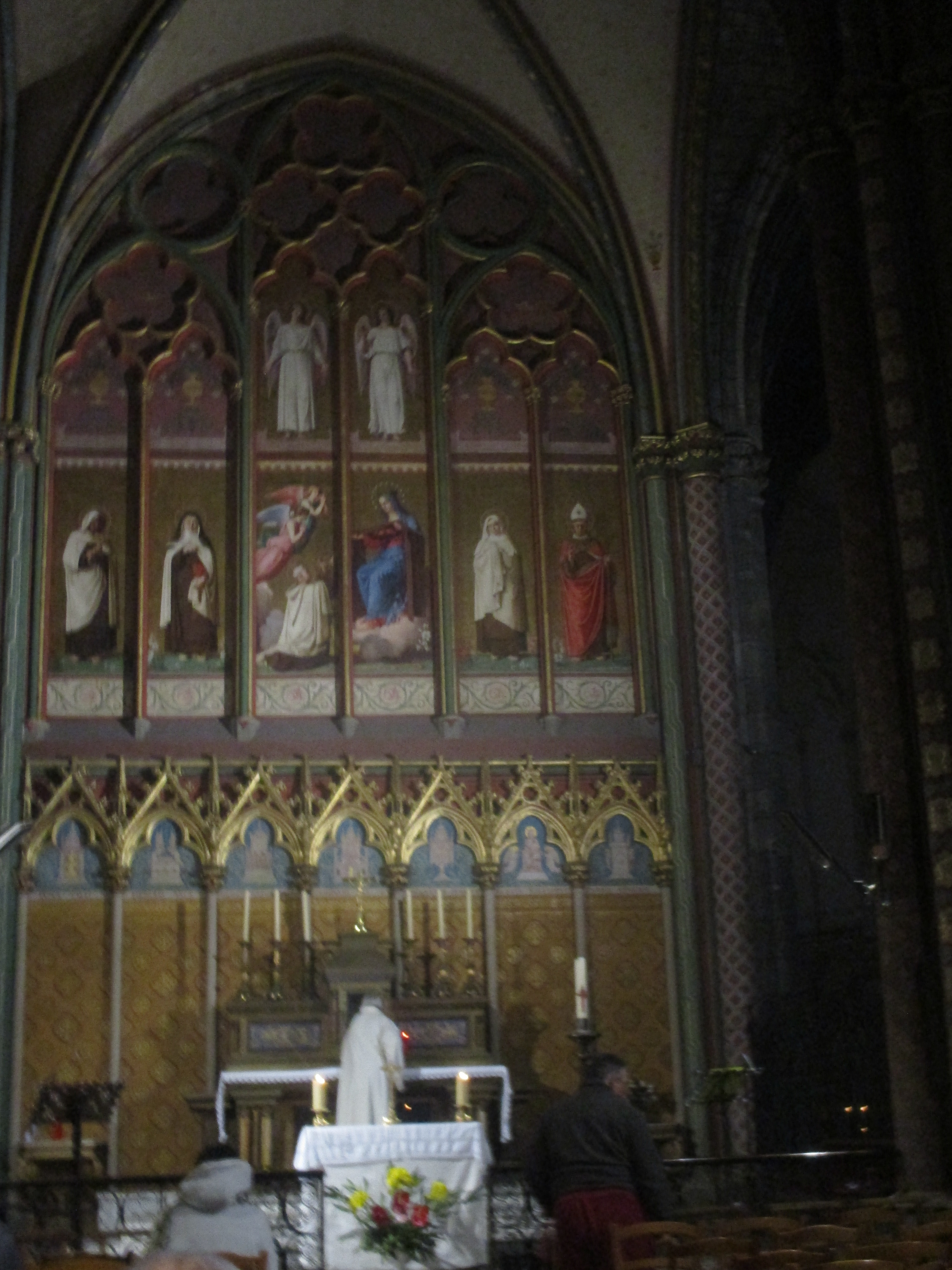
Chapel of the Virgin, at the east end of apse

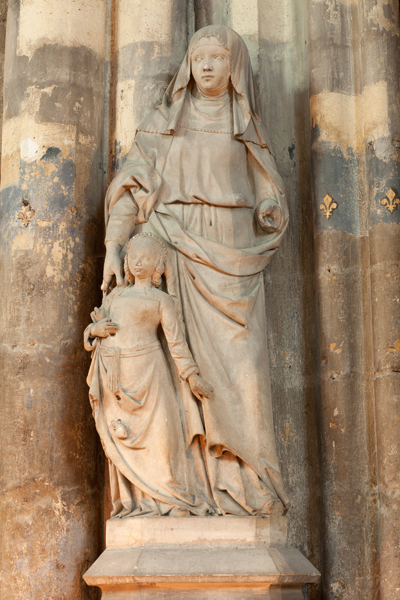
Statue of Saint Anne and the Virgin Mary, outside the Saint Anne chapel

Four chapels radiate off the east end, all in similar styles, dedicated to the Annunciation, Margaret Mary Alacoque, Saint Anne and Saint Charles Borromeo. The chapel of the axis is dedicated to the Holy Sacrament or Sacred Heart; it displays the most decoration, with tracery, blind arcades and relief sculpture, and a gable over the altar. The stained glass windows are all from the 19th century. The Chapel of Saint Anne preserves faded murals from the 14th century depicting the Saint's life. In the ambulatory outside the chapel is a statue of Saint Anne with the young Virgin Mary (16th c.).

Other chapels are located on the north and south side. Several small chapels were consolidated in the 1850s and 1860s to create the chapel of Saint Joseph on the south side and Our Lady of Mount Carmel on the north side, dedicated to the Carmelite prior Saint Simon Stock, who died in Bordeaux in 1265.

A bronze statue of Joan of Arc is placed outside the Chapel of Saint Anne. It is a cast from a model by Antoine Bourdelle, a student of Rodin and one of the founding figures of Art Deco.

=== Organ and tribune ===
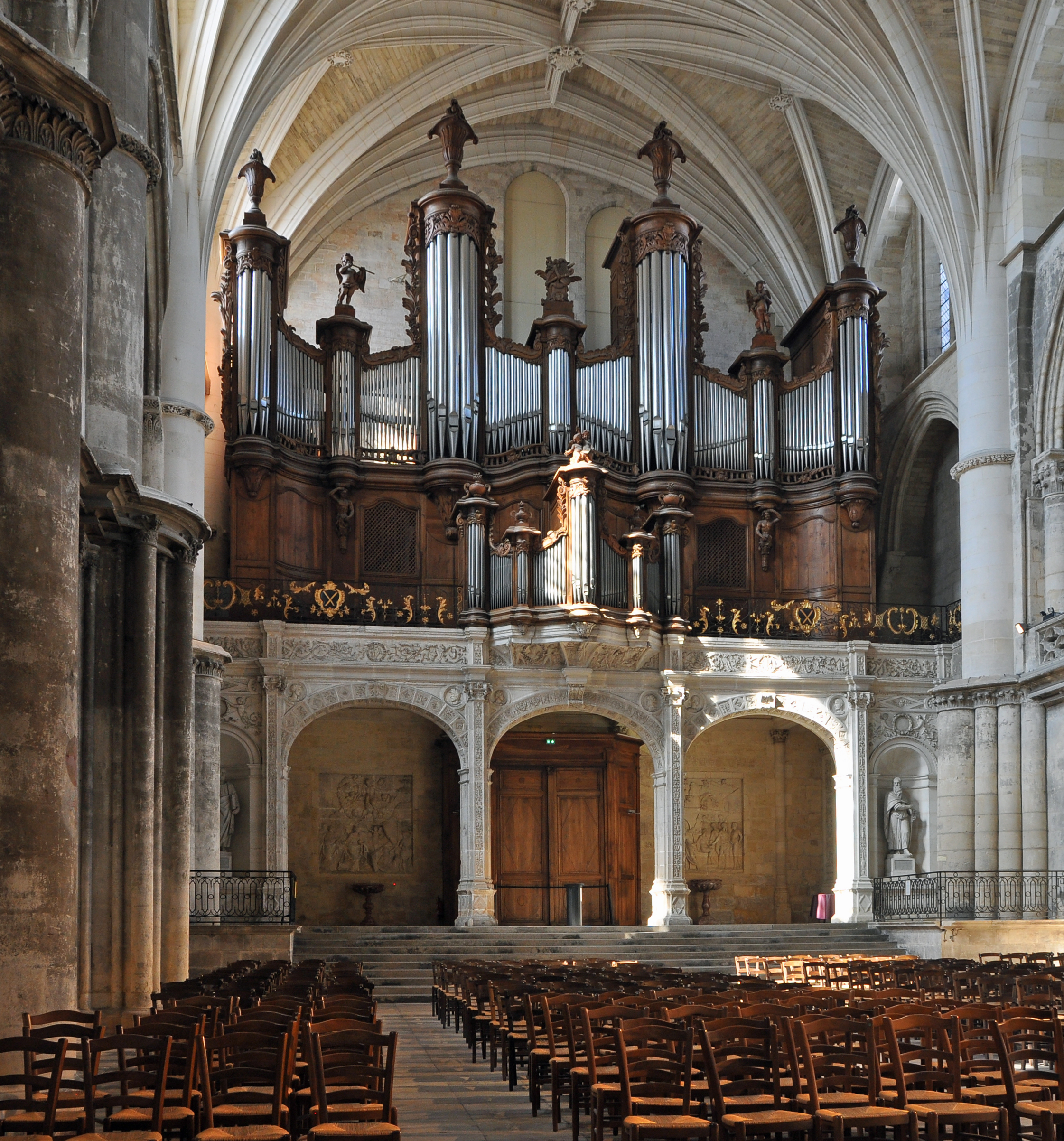
The Grand organ and its tribune with sculpture

The Cathedral has a long-standing organ tradition, documented as early as the 14th century. Over the centuries, several instruments succeeded one another, often destroyed, rebuilt, or transformed. From the Renaissance onward, the cathedral housed two organs: a grand organ in the gallery and a choir organ. The grand organ, repeatedly rebuilt and enlarged (notably in the 17th century by Valéran de Héman), became a monumental instrument, housed in an imposing case. After the French Revolution, both organs disappeared. In 1804, the organ from La Réole (Micot, 1766) was transferred to Saint-André but deemed insufficient; in 1811 it was exchanged for the organ of Sainte-Croix Abbey, attributed to Dom Bedos (1748), a masterpiece of French organ building. The windchests and pipes were integrated in 1816–1817 into Micot’s case, enlarged by the architect Combes. The organ then comprised 47 stops on 4 manuals and pedal, and impressed with the monumental scale of its case. In the 19th century, Henry (1837–1841) restored and enlarged the organ to 49 stops, then Wenner (1875–1877) rebuilt the action and added a large Romantic-style expressive division, bringing the total to 56 stops. In the 20th century, despite various interventions, the instrument deteriorated. In 1972, the Commission for Historic Monuments decided to preserve the grand case while transferring the Dom Bedos elements to Sainte-Croix, where his organ could be reconstructed.

In 1975, the Danion-Gonzalez firm built a new instrument inside the historic case. Designed with mechanical action but electrified in 1987, it quickly revealed major design flaws, leading to repeated interventions (1992, 1997, 1999, 2001, 2002, 2004, 2010) without lasting results. After ten years of study, a new call for tenders was issued in 2023–2024. The project was awarded to Rieger Orgelbau and Orglez L’Haridon-Freyburger. The future organ, scheduled for completion in 2030, will be installed in the restored historic case, with financing relying in part on an ongoing sponsorship campaign.

The tribune upon which the organ is placed, and the walls on either side of the portal, are decorated with exceptionally fine relief sculptures, which were originally a part of the old rood screen between the choir and the nave. They date to before 1544. The sculpture shows the influence of the Italian artist Rosso Fiorentino, who had introduced the Renaissance style to France at the Palace of Fontainebleau shortly before this time.

== Bells ==
The cathedral has 4 bells located in the Pey-Berland Tower. The lower level has two large bells, Marie and the bourdon Ferdinand-André II. Both are cast by the Bollée foundry in Le Mans and currently hung dead, however they toll rather than swing. The “II” of Ferdinand-André II is significant because it replaced a short-lived 11-ton predecessor which was cracked upon delivery and had to be melted down. The upper level has 2 smaller bells, Marguerite and Clémence, These two bells currently operate and chime to mark services, masses, weddings and funerals at Saint-André. Since 1925, electric motors have been used and they are controlled from inside the cathedral itself.

== Stained glass windows ==
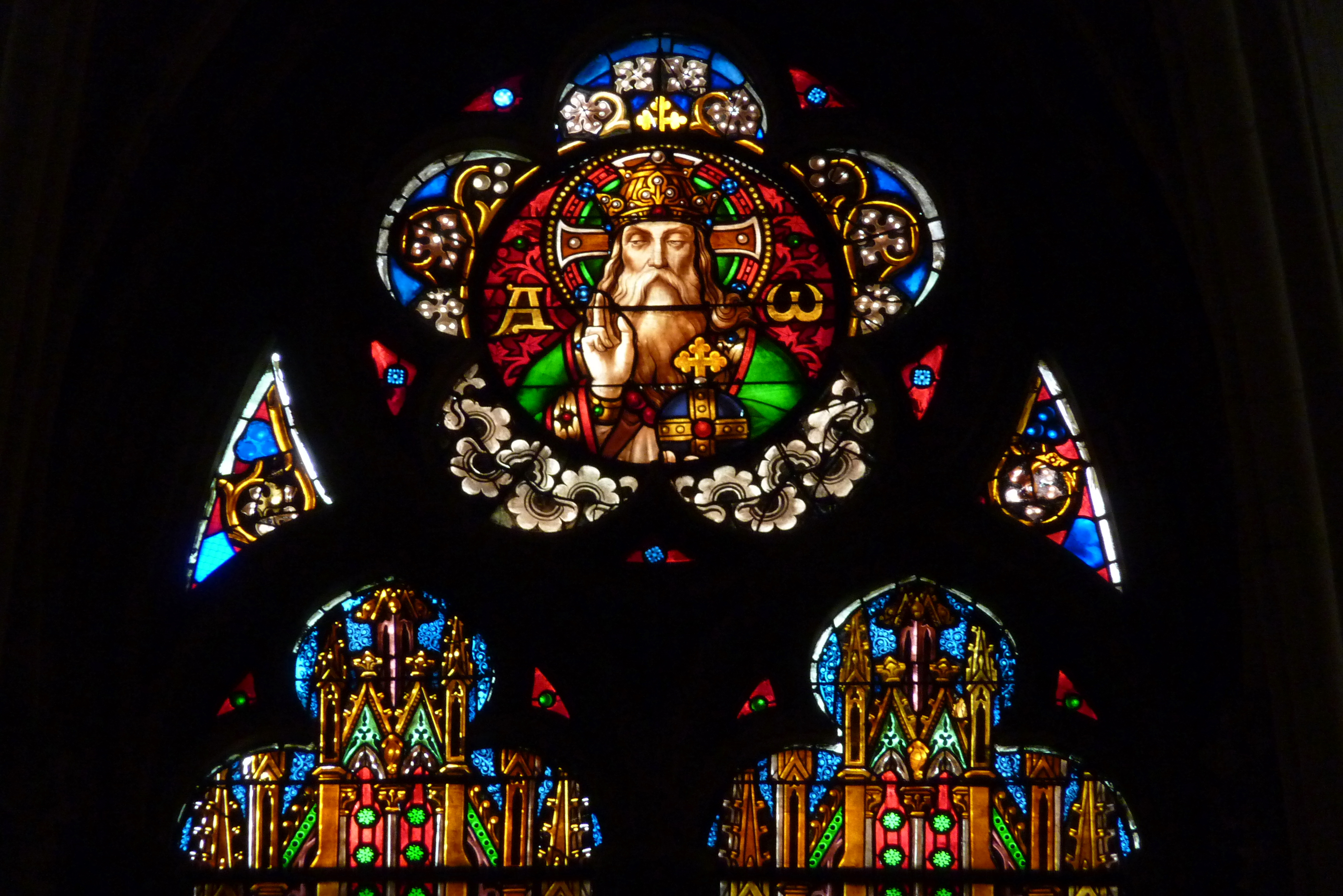
Top of central window in the axis chapel - "Alpha and Omega"

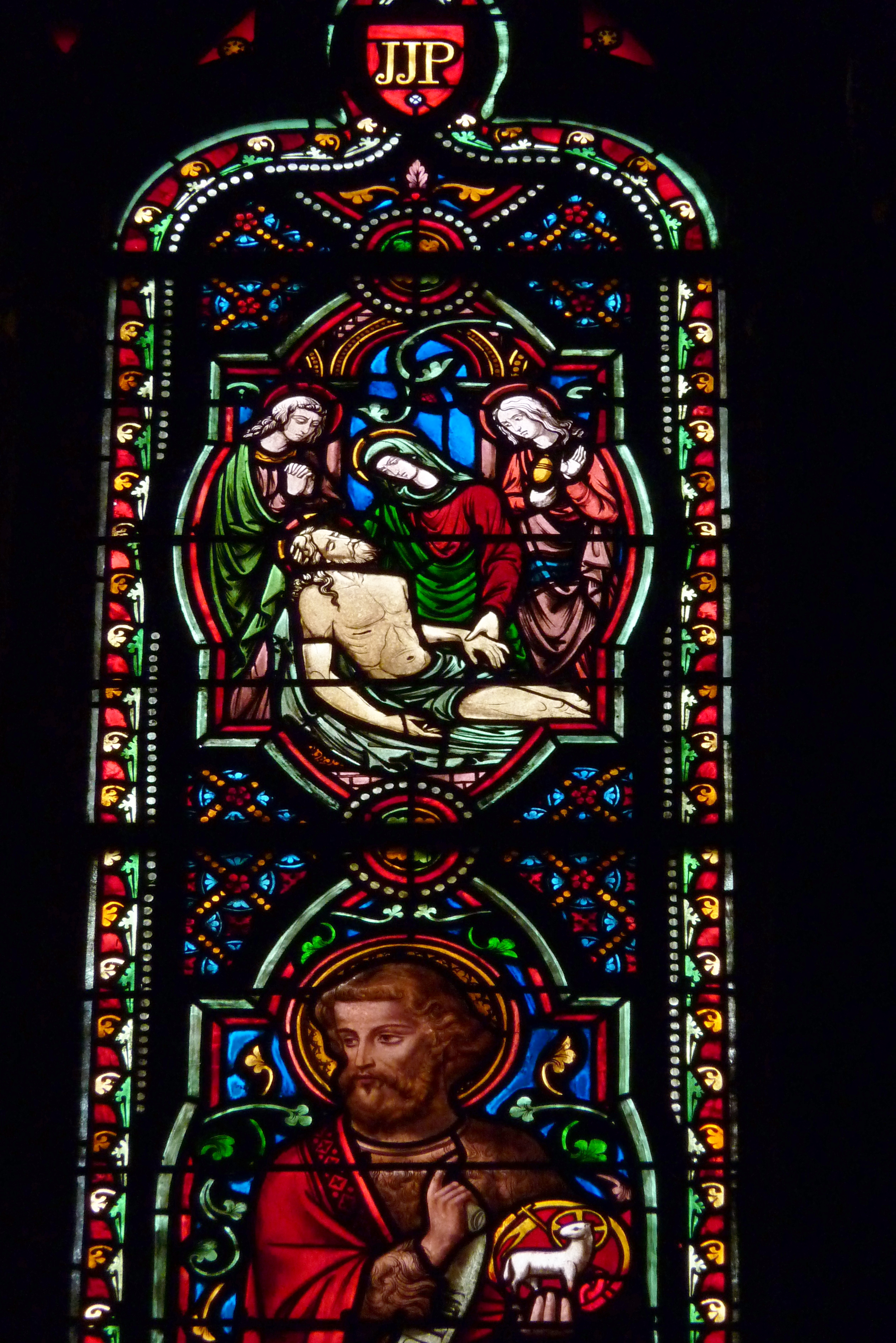
The crucifixion and Saint John (detail)

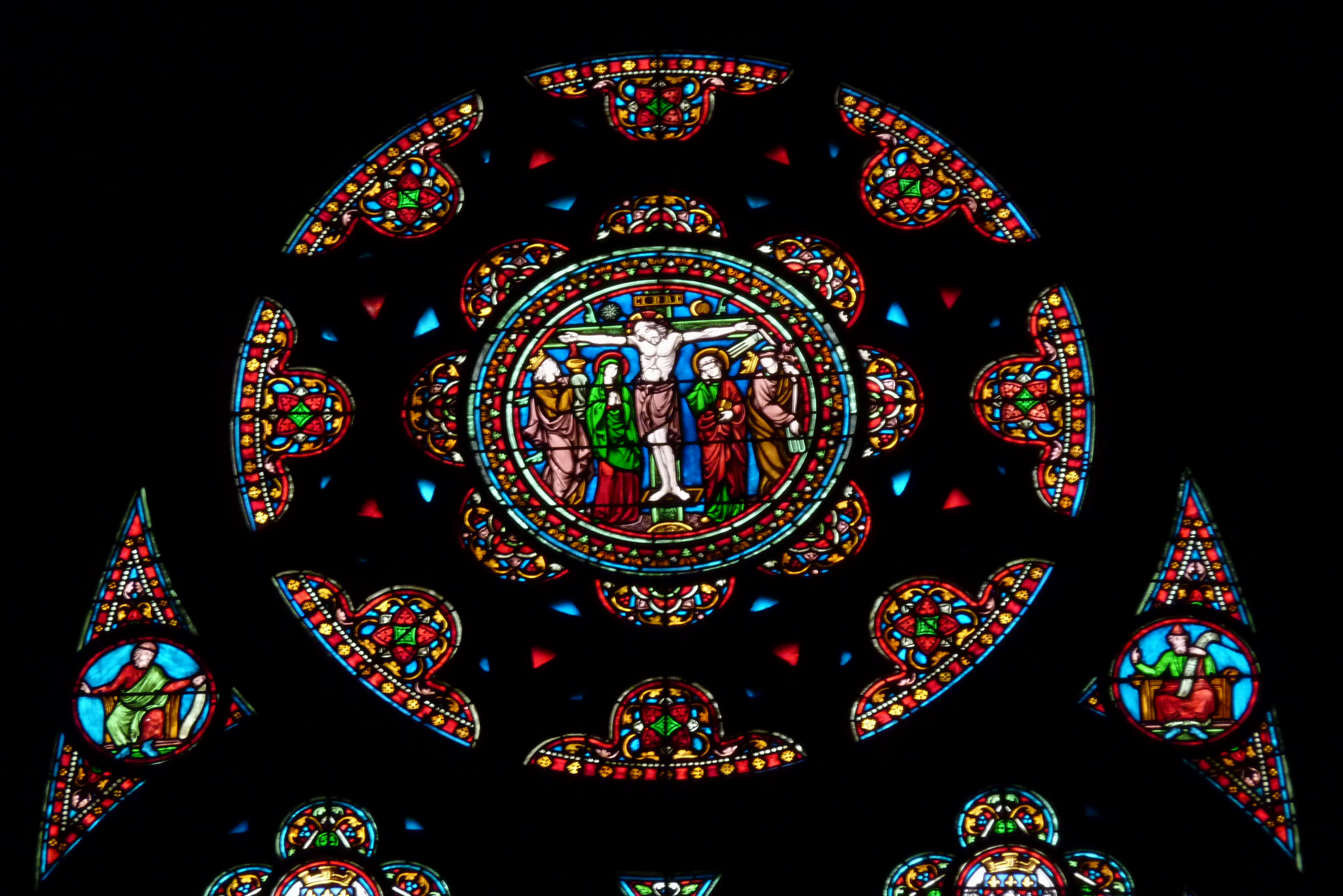
Axis chapel window

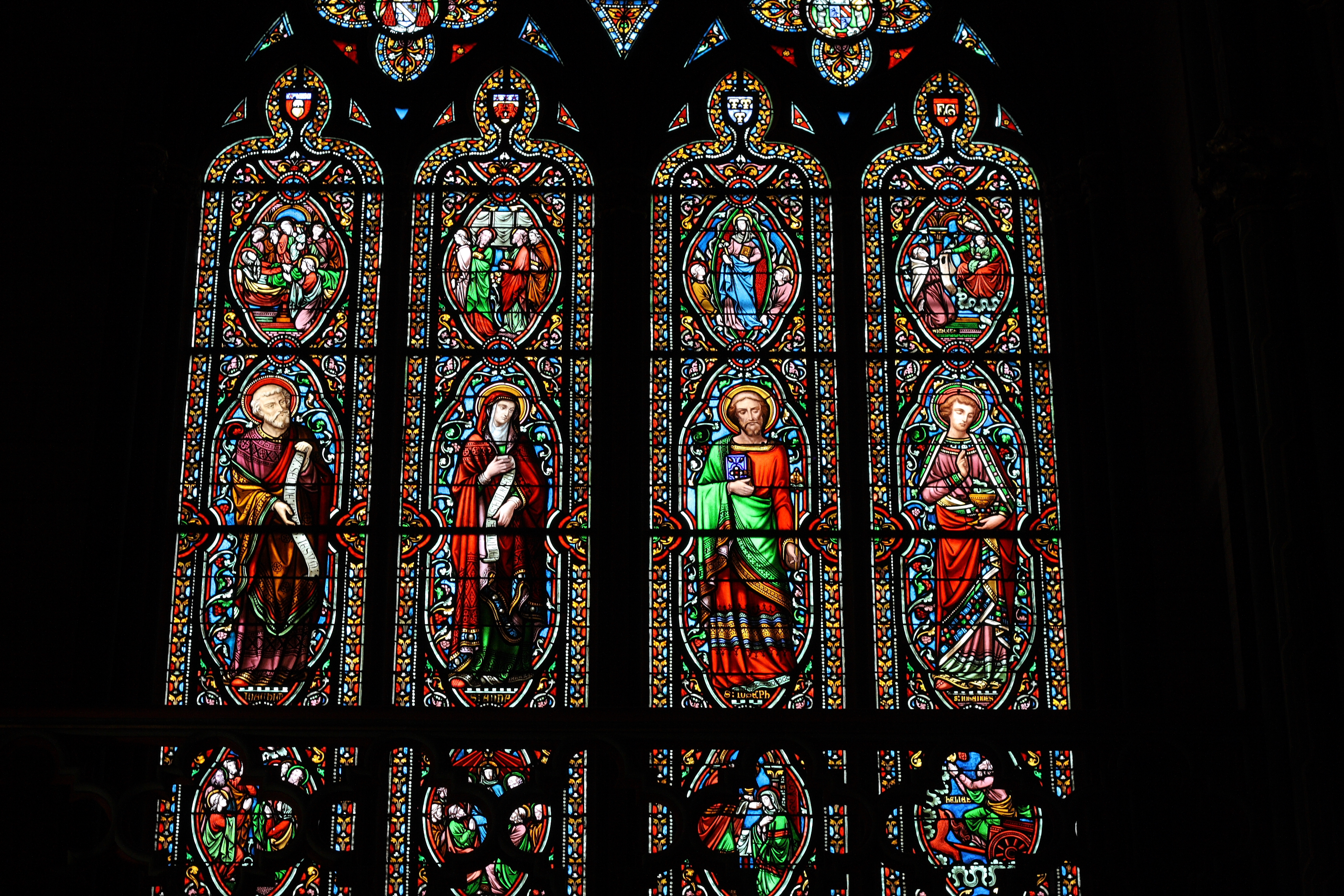
Saints and Apostles window

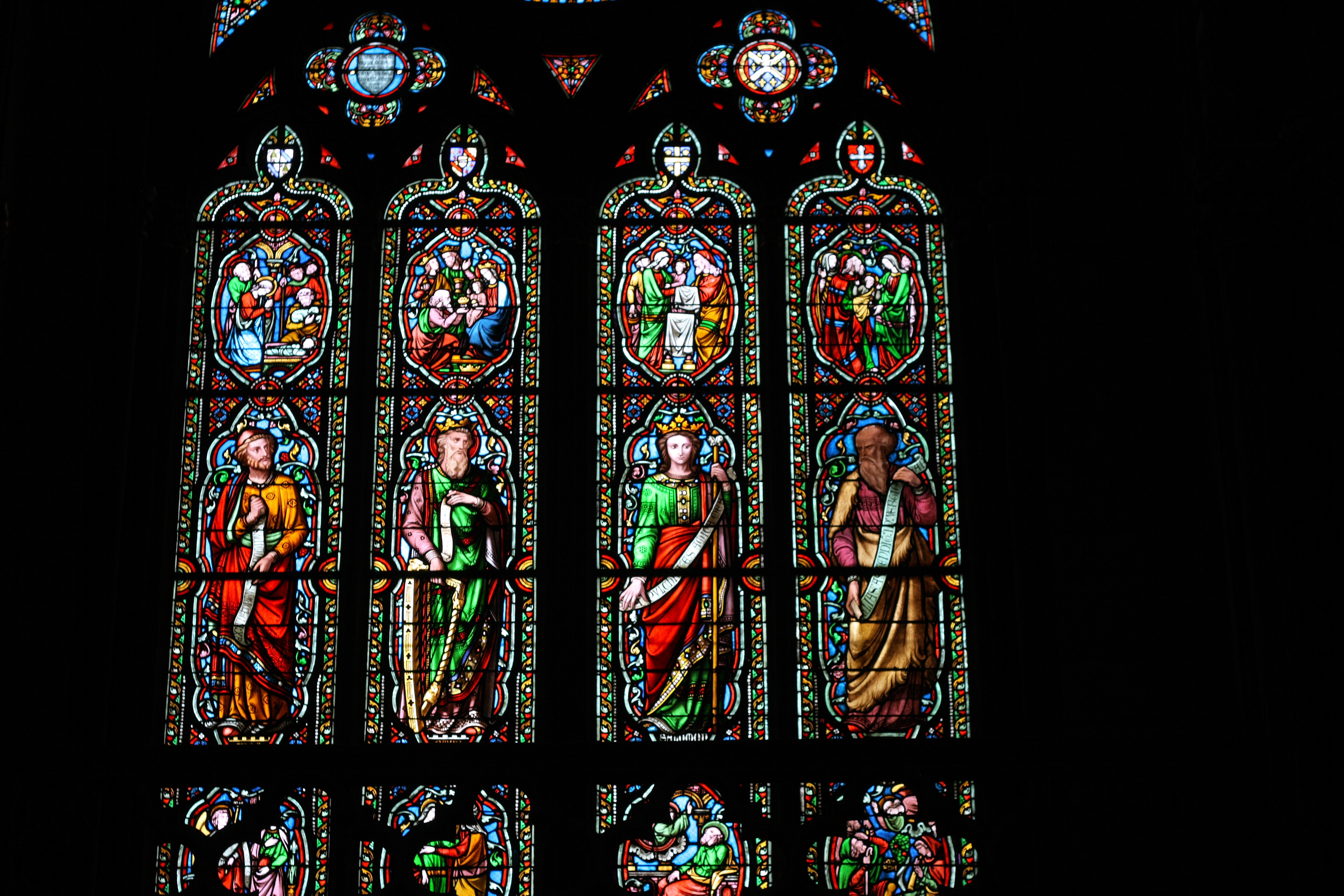
King David and Old Testament figures

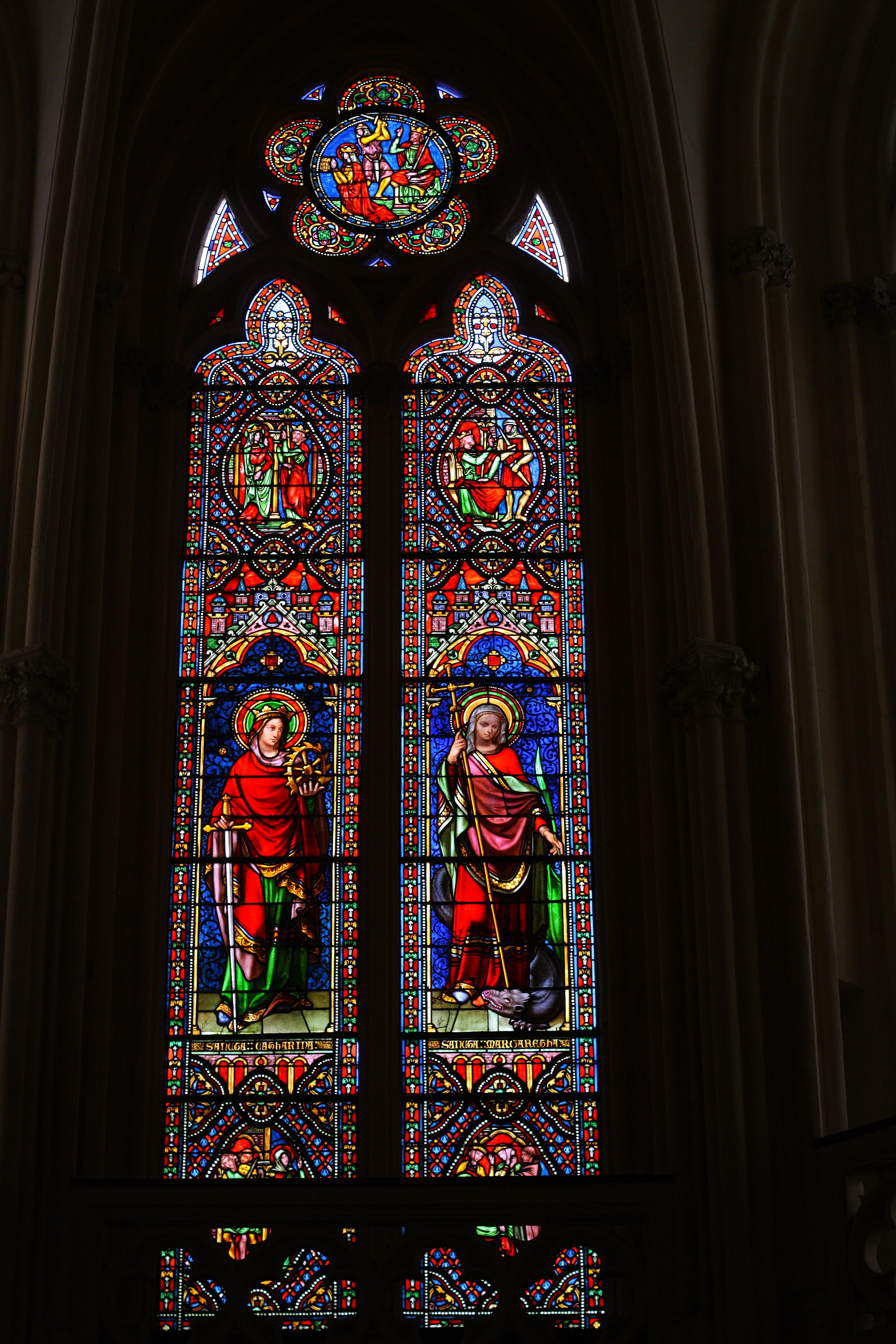
Saint Catherine and Margaret of Antioch

Only a few pieces of medieval glass still remain in the cathedral windows, integrated into the rose window of the north transept. The rest of the windows date to the 19th century. They were installed by glassmaker Joseph Villiet beginning in 1852, and by his successor, Henry Feur. Their windows fill the walls of the chapels and the high windows of the choir.

== Marcadé collection ==
The cathedral is home to the Marcadé collection, which consists of a group of forty-two illuminations, among other objects (paintings, sculptures, liturgical vestments and silver objects). It was given to Bordeaux Cathedral by Canon Marcadé in 1947. These illuminations have been exhibited starting in 2015 in the cathedral, in a room specially designed for this collection.

== Gallery ==
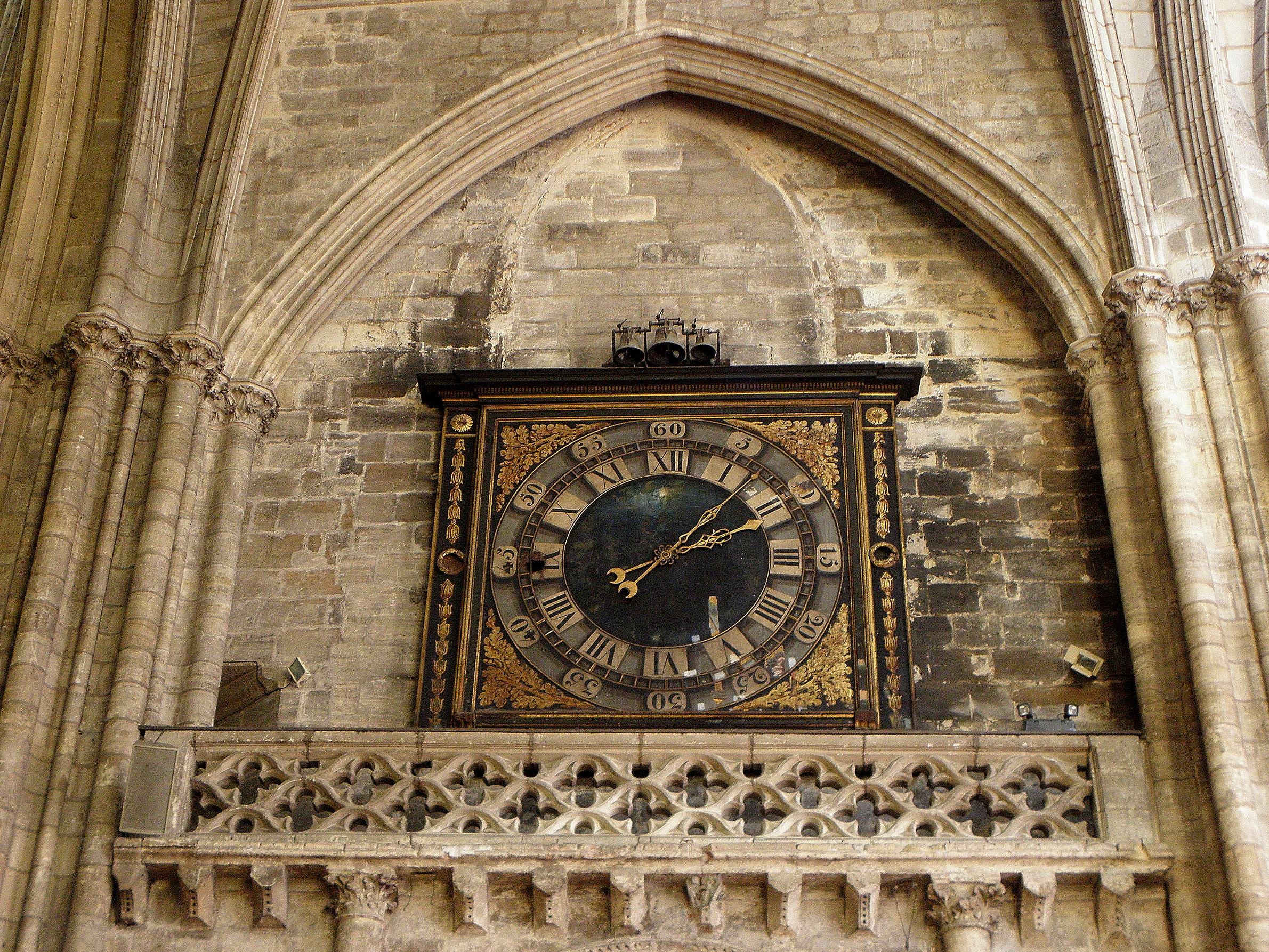
Cathedral clock

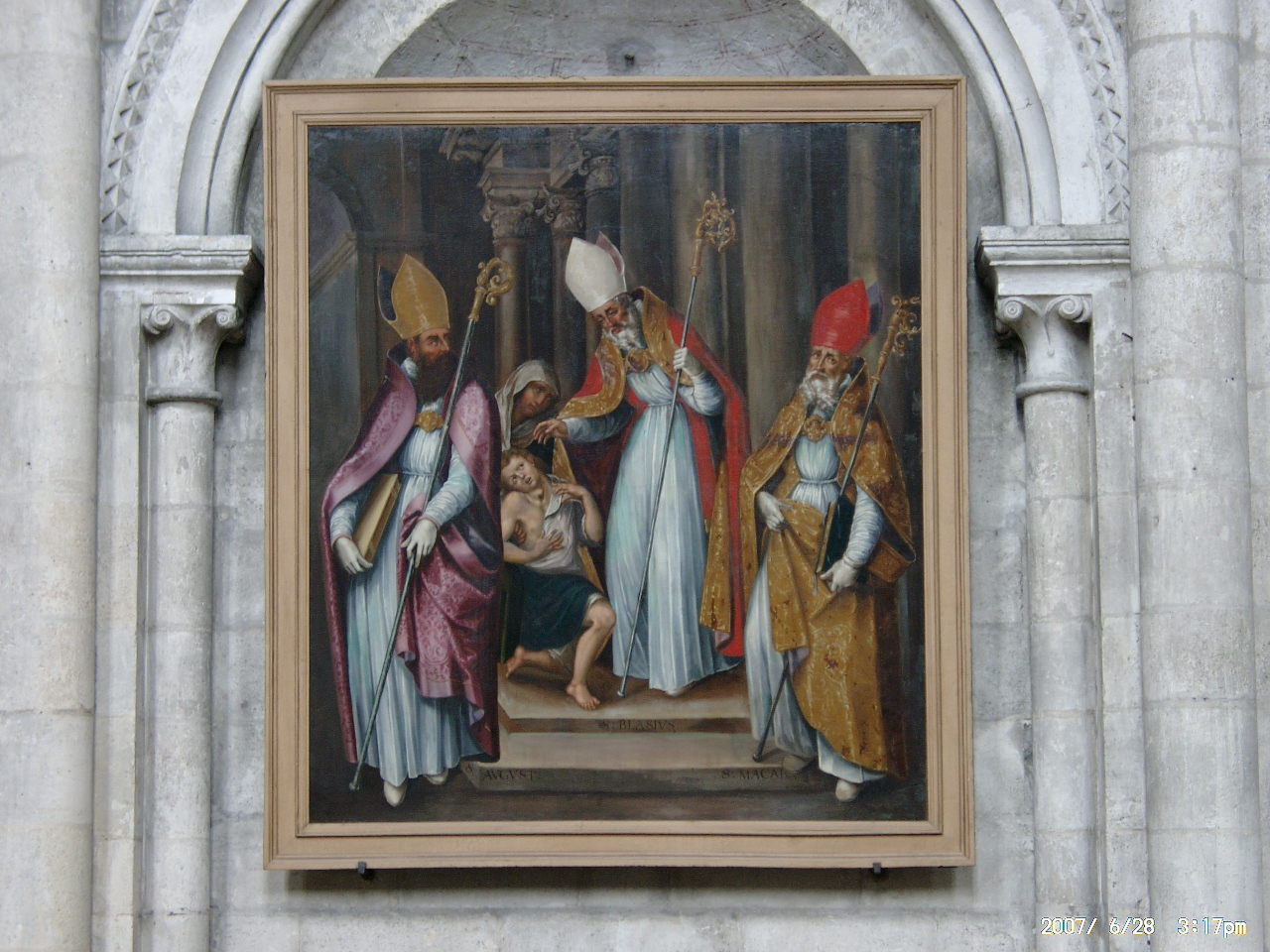
St Augustine, St Blaise and St Macarius

== Access ==
The site is served by line A and line B of the tramway de Bordeaux at Station Hôtel de Ville.

== See also ==
- French Gothic architecture
- Gothic cathedrals and churches
- List of cathedrals in France
- List of Gothic Cathedrals in Europe
- World Heritage Sites of the Routes of Santiago de Compostela in France
- High medieval domes

== Citations ==
Article incorporates text licensed under the CC-by license from Heritage Science as cited
