= Basilica of Saint Severinus, Bordeaux =

Basilica of Saint Severinus, Bordeaux Basilique Saint-Seurin de Bordeaux
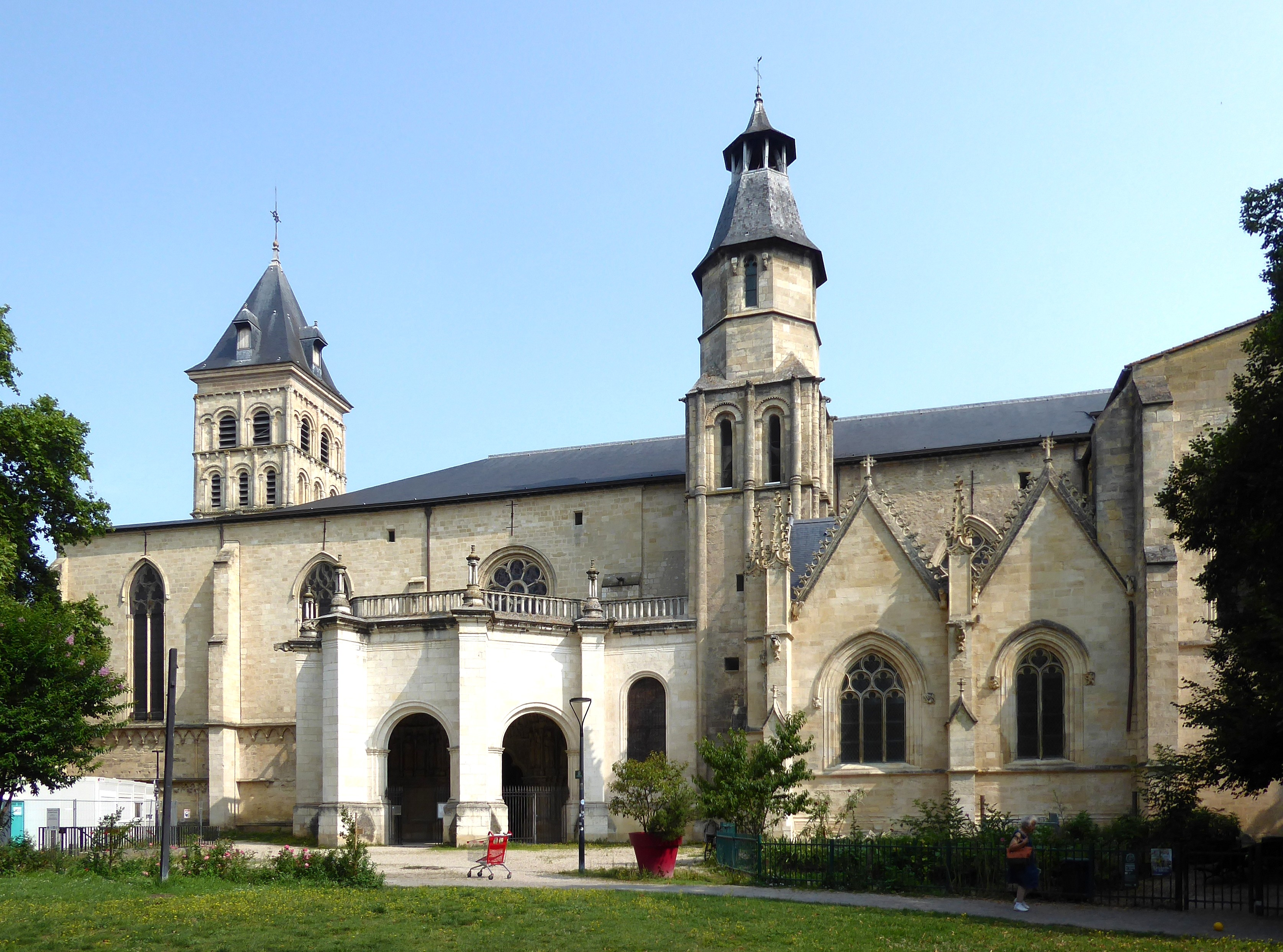
- A view of the basilica from the Place des Martyrs de la Résistance.

Religion
- Affiliation: Roman Catholic
- Diocese: Roman Catholic Archdiocese of Bordeaux

Location
- Location: Bordeaux, Gironde, Nouvelle-Aquitaine, France
- Interactive map of Basilica of Saint Severinus, Bordeaux; Basilique Saint-Seurin de Bordeaux
- Coordinates: 44.8432°N 0.5857°W

Architecture
- Type: Minor basilica
- Style: Romanesque
- Groundbreaking: 11th century
- Spire height

UNESCO World Heritage Site
- Official name: Part of Routes of Santiago de Compostela in France
- Criteria: Cultural: (ii), (iv), (vi)
- Reference: 868
- Inscription: 1998 (22nd Session)

The Basilica of Saint Severinus (French: Basilique Saint-Seurin de Bordeaux) is a church built in Bordeaux at the dawn of the 11th century.

In 1998, UNESCO designated the Routes of Santiago de Compostela in France as a World Heritage Site, including the three main churches of Bordeaux : the basilica of St. Severinus, the basilica of St Michael and St. Andrew's cathedral.

== History ==
=== Ancient origins ===
The basilica is built upon a Christian necropolis dating to the 4th century. The epitaph of Flavinus was engraved beneath a representation of a chrism on the lid of a sarcophagus dating to between 365 and 385, testifying to the Christian presence in Bordeaux to Late Antiquity. This epitaph was extracted during an excavation of the necropolis in 1909. Today, it is housed in the Museum of Aquitaine in Bordeaux.

=== Foundation legends ===
Named after the fourth bishop and patron saint of Bordeaux, the history of the basilica begins with the founding of the Abbey of Saint Severinus in the 4th century.

Saint Severinus, born in the Levant, arrived in Bordeaux in the 4th century and met Bishop Amandus. Gregory of Tours tells the story in his work In Gloria Confessorum: "the Bishop Amandus who governed the church of Bordeaux had one night a dream in which the Lord said unto him, 'Rise up and go thou forth to meet my servant Severin...', and lo, there indeed was Saint Severin coming to meet him. Approaching one another, they greeted each other by name, threw themselves in each other's arms, prayed, kissed and entered the church singing psalms". Thus Severinus became bishop of Bordeaux.

Another legend involving the basilica is that of the Oliphant of Roland (nephew to Charlemagne and famous for his death at Roncevaux) being placed on the altar by the emperor while carrying the remains of the valiant knight. The famous Song of Roland recounts this: "Vint a Burdeles, la citet de... Desur l’alter seint Sevrin le baron Met l’oliphan plein d’or e de manguns: Li pelerin le veient ki la vunt". A Great Step in the Way of Compostela in the Middle Ages, the pilgrims are invited to pass by Saint Severinus to contemplate this relic.

== Architecture ==
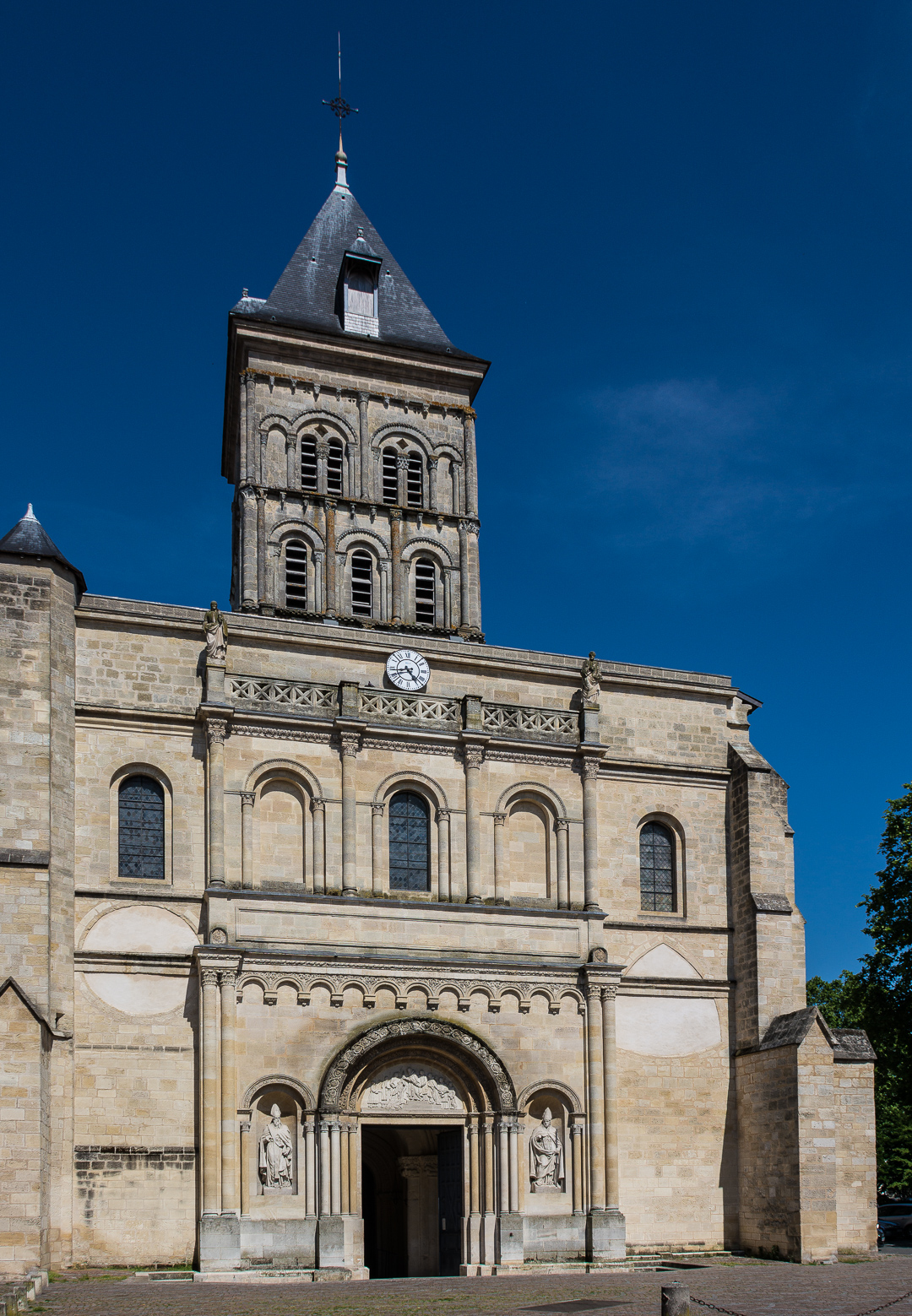
Entrance

=== Mid-5th century ===
Despite the legends surrounding the founding of the church, the presence of an early religious building is attested to in the mid 5th century. It was probably a temple or an oratory. It disappeared in the 9th century due to Viking invasions.

=== 11th–13th centuries ===
At the beginning of the 11th century, the canons of the basilica decided to commence a major reconstruction. It has the shape of a robust Romanesque church in the basilical form. Frequented by pilgrims on the Ways of Saint James of Compostela, the canons led the travelers up to the choir and down into the crypt so that they could see them. During this period, the basilica was the scene of an investiture ceremony consecrating access to power over the County of Bordeaux, especially by the Dukes of Aquitaine.

During the course of the 11th through 13th centuries the nave and the choir were built. In the 13th century, the canons ordered the construction of the southern entry which is surmounted by a porch with a belfry built in the Renaissance style. They also built a monumental Gothic entrance for the necropolis. The entrance consists of a large bay flanked by two blind arches and is decorated with fourteen carved statues representing the twelve apostles and two female statues representing the Synagogue and the Church. The church has three tympana: the main one is decorated with scenes from the Resurrection and the Judgement; the left has a representation of the holy women who visited the tomb; and the right depicts the arrival of Saint Severinus according to Saint Amand's dream. The five-sided porch that leads to it was built later.

=== 14th–18th centuries ===
The 14th and 15th centuries mark the construction of several chapels. One of them was the Chapel of Madonna of the Rose which was dedicated to the Virgin. It contains an altar that was consecrated by Archbishop Pey Berland in 1444. It was designed in the flamboyant Gothic architecture reminiscent of that found in late-15th-century Normandy and England.

Twice in 1566 and 1698, parts of the church's vault structure collapsed causing serious damage. At the beginning of the 18th century, the architect Jean-Baptiste Augier was charged with rebuilding and bracing them with pillars equipped with stone belt courses. During this repair, he ordered that the floor be backfilled because of its considerable unevenness (nearly three meters). These repairs led to the burial of the crypt and a major modification of the ground of the western porch which dated to the 11th century.

=== 19th century ===
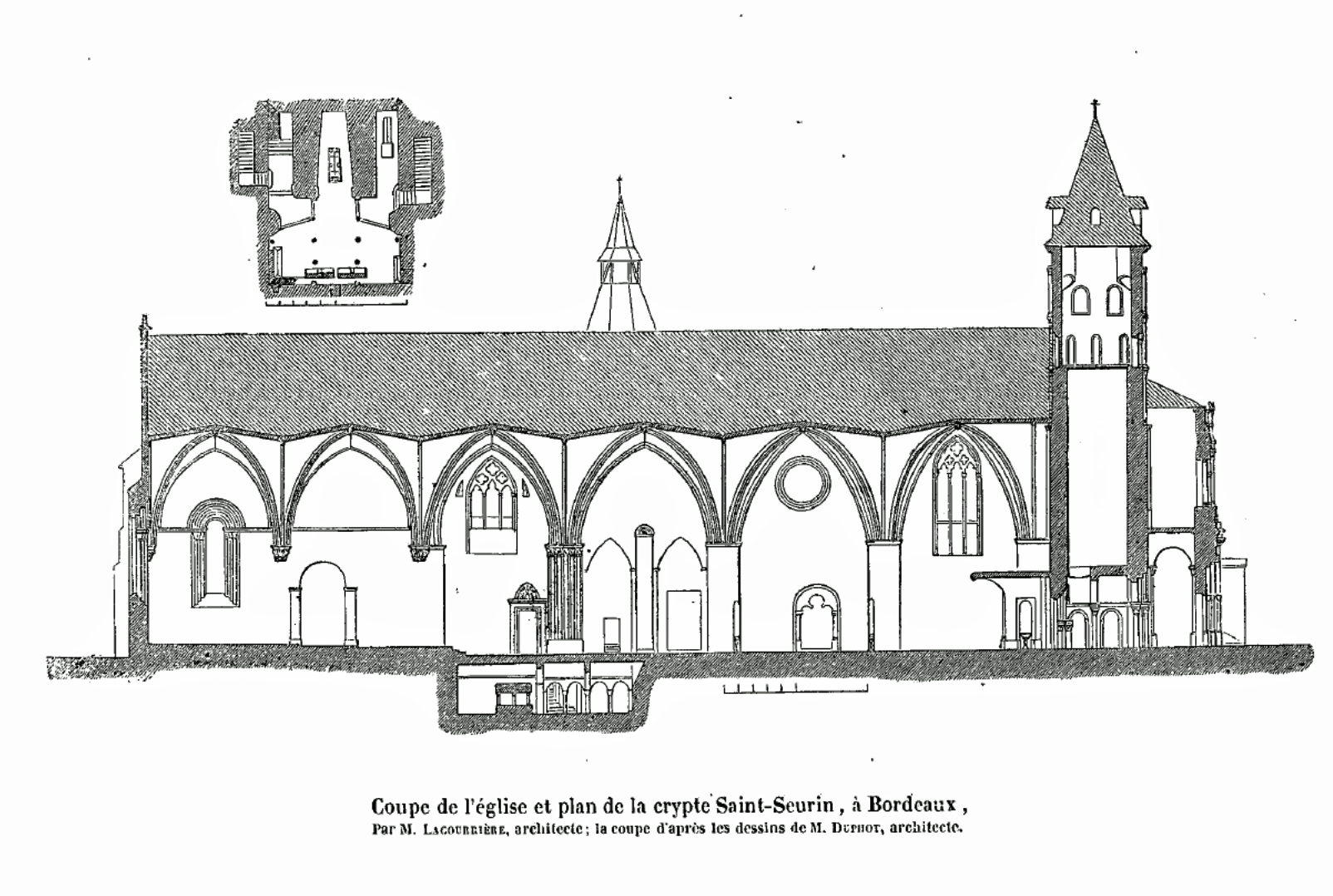
A cross-sectional view of the Basilica of Saint Severinus in 1850.

Though the Basilica of Saint Severinus was spared during the French Revolution, it was headed for a century of profound changes in the 1800s.

In the late 1820s, the western façade was restored by order of the Saint Severinus Building Council. To accomplish this the council hired architect Pierre-Alexandre Poitevin to create a neo-Romanesque façade. The construction of the porch gate hides the Romanesque porch.

Sculptor Dominique Fortuné Maggesi (1801-1892), an artist from Carrara who would go one to the greatest sculptor in the history of Bordeaux, was chosen to decorate the façade. He adorned the entrance with statues of Saint Severinus and Saint Amand whose encounter is depicted on the tympanum.He also carved statues of Saint John and Saint Peter which adorn the balustrade on the upper floor. This was done to give homogeneity to both the façade and Romanesque bell tower of the basilica.

In 1840, the Basilica of Saint Severinus was listed in the Inventory of Historic Monuments (French: l'inventaire des Monuments Historiques). Following this classification, its choir was completely reorganized and a new marble altar was made.. Arcades were opened and two chapels were dedicated: one to Saint Fort and other one to the Sacred Heart. They were built on the north side of the basilica. The painter and glassmaker Joseph Villiet signed the stained glass windows of the nave that he created which depict scenes from the bible as well as the history and legends that surround the basilica.

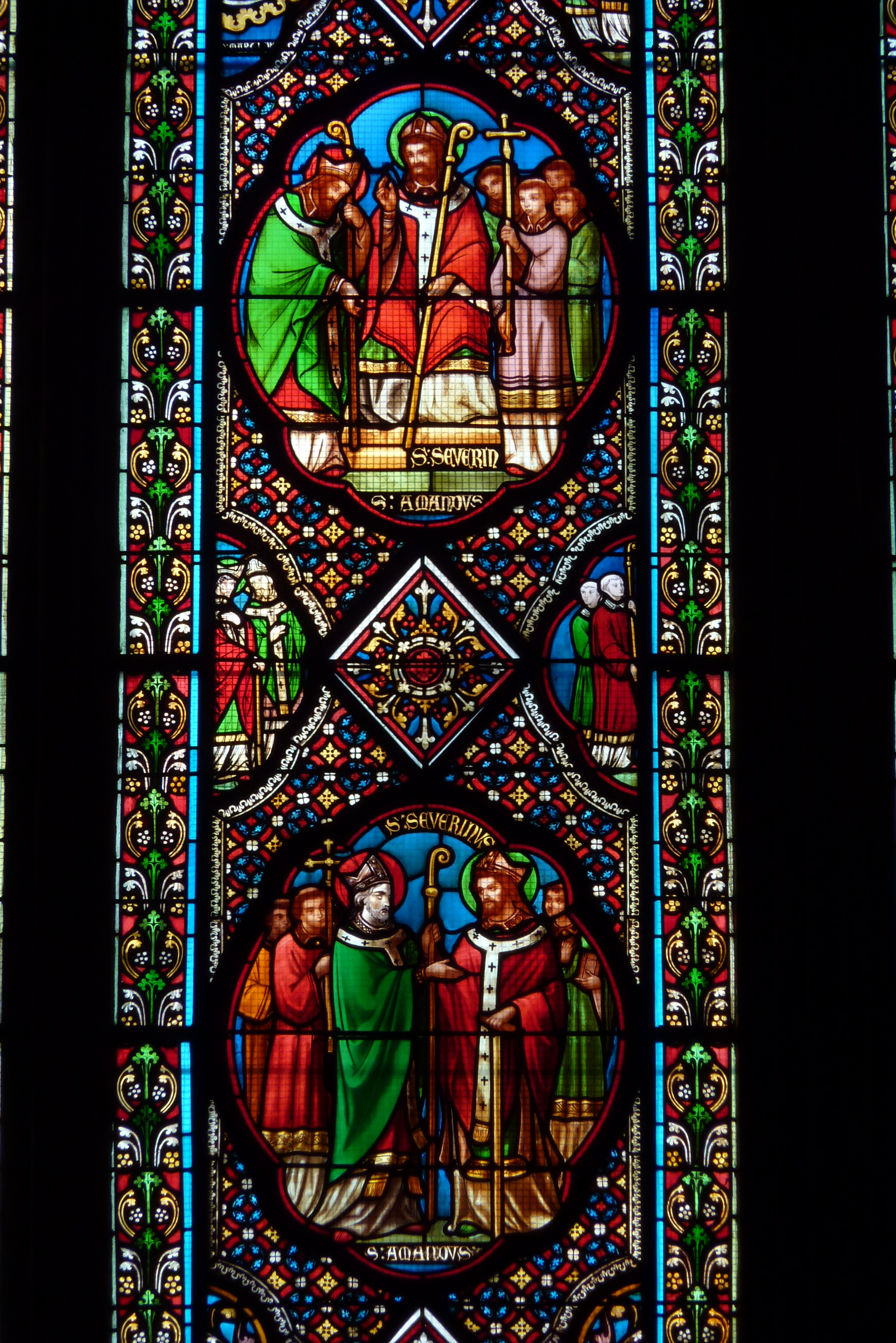
Detail of the stained glass representation of the meeting of Saint Severinus and Saint Amand

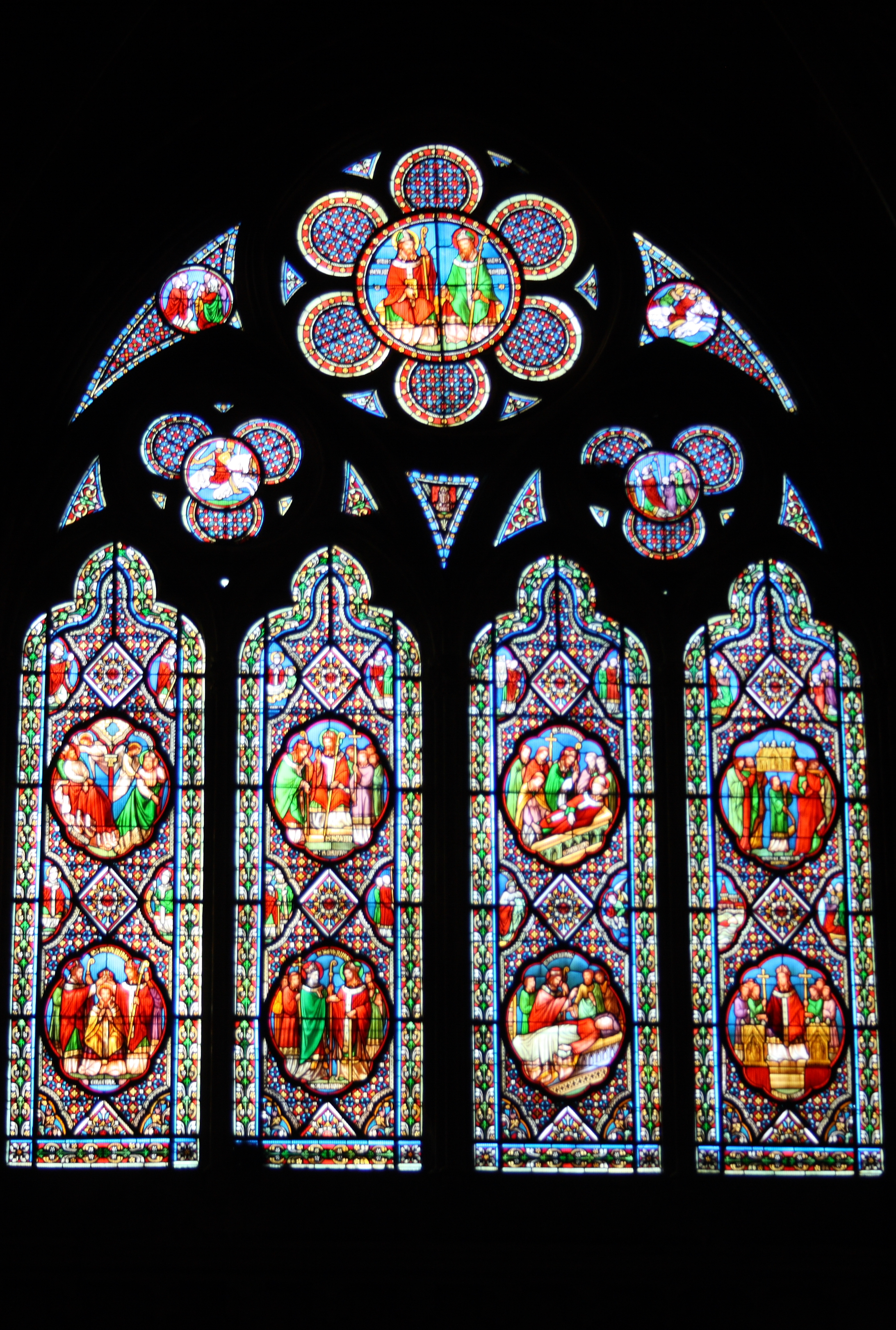
Stained glass representation of the life of Saint Severinus

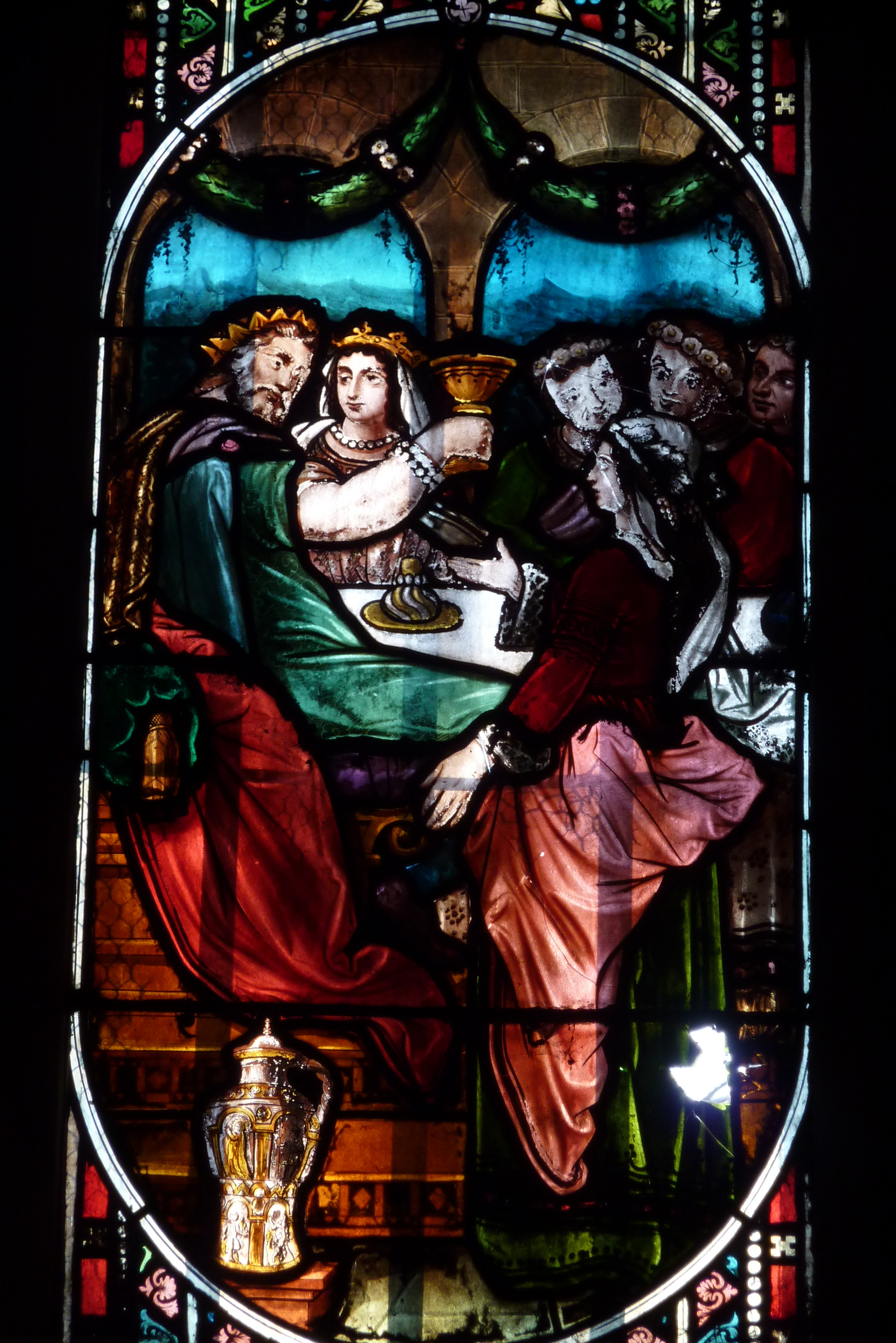
Stained glass representation of the Queen of Sheba and Solomon

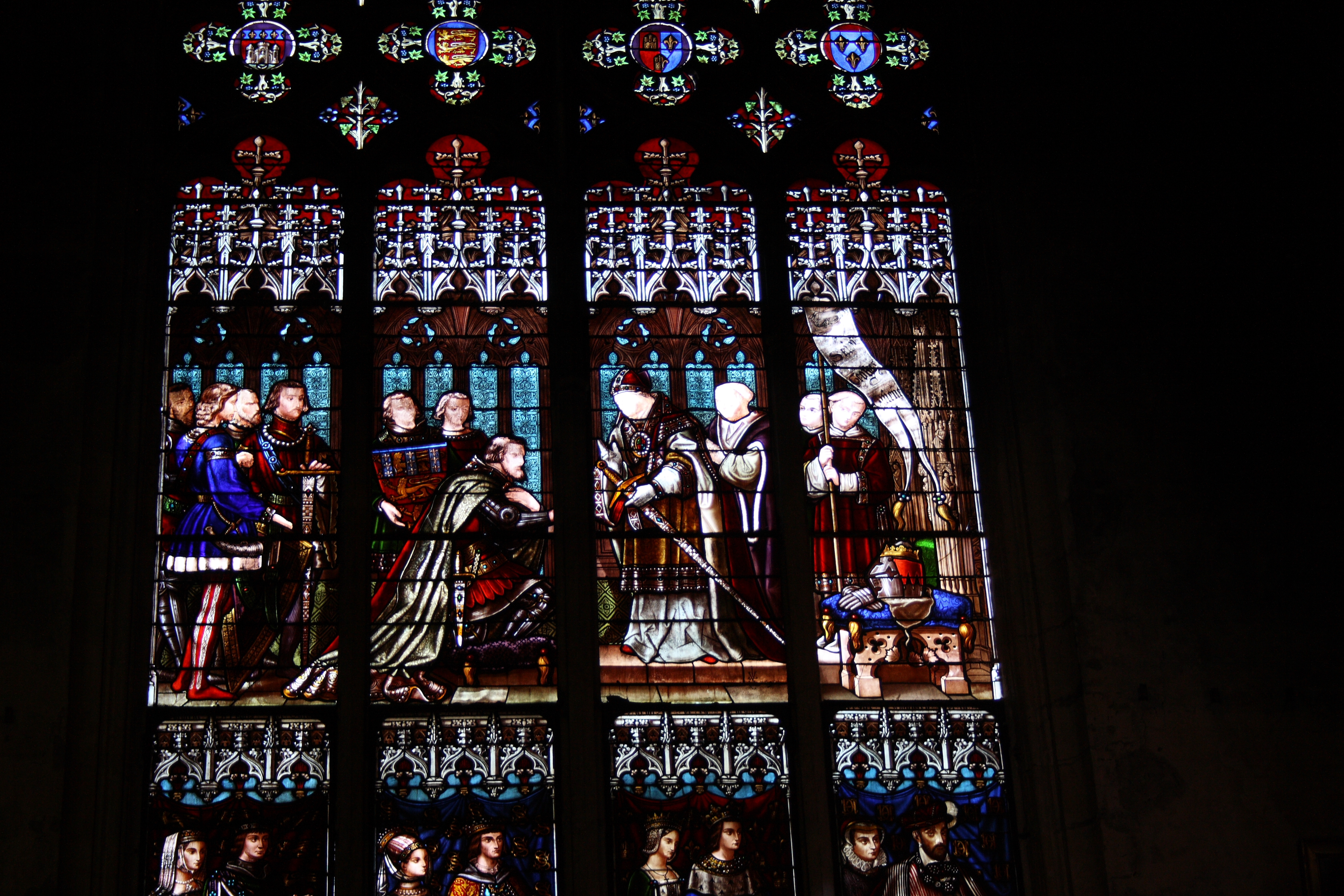
Stained Glass of the Kings, representation of the Black Prince kneeling before the Bishop of Amenieu

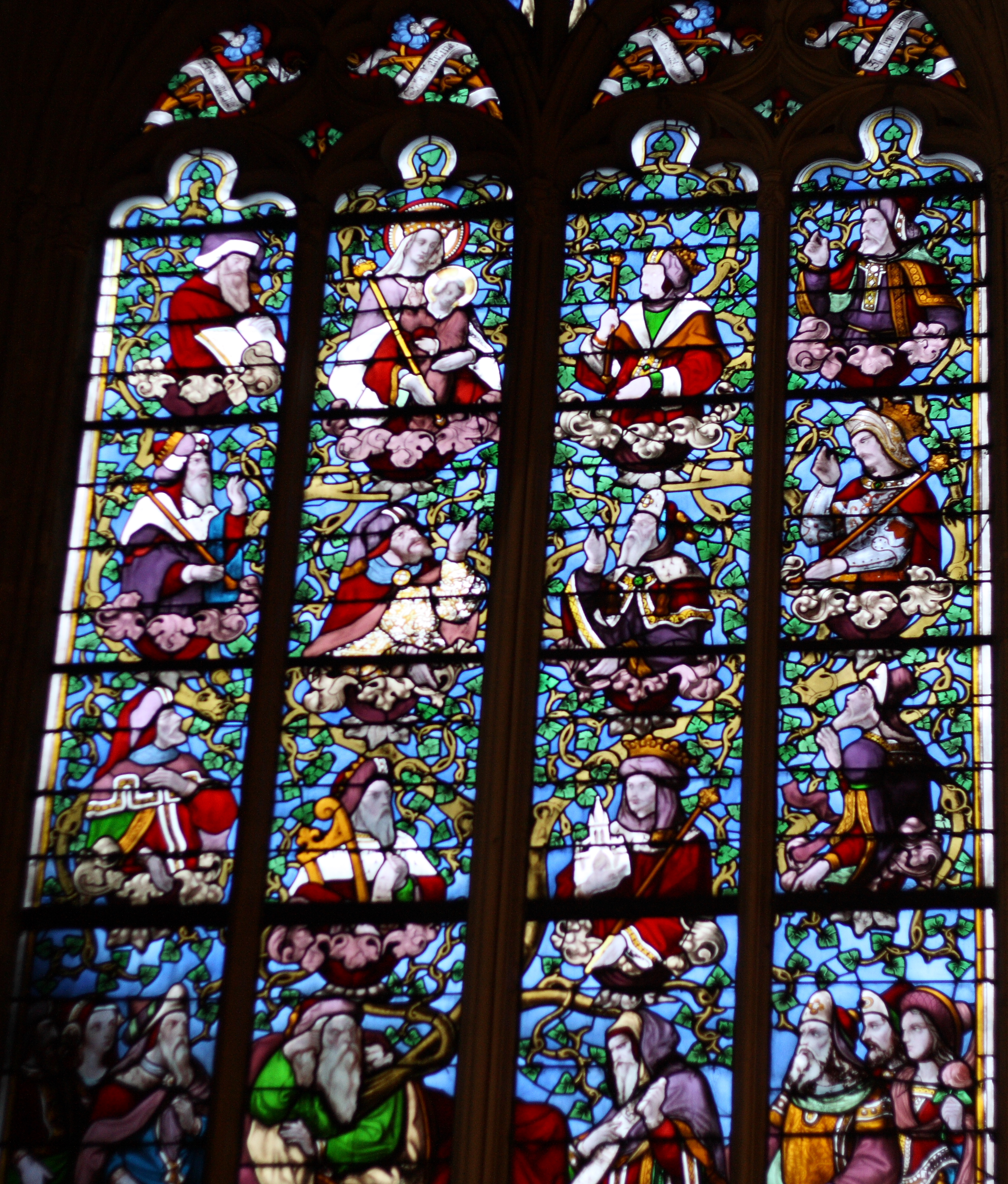
Stained glass representation of the Tree of Jesse, based on Isaiah 11:1-9

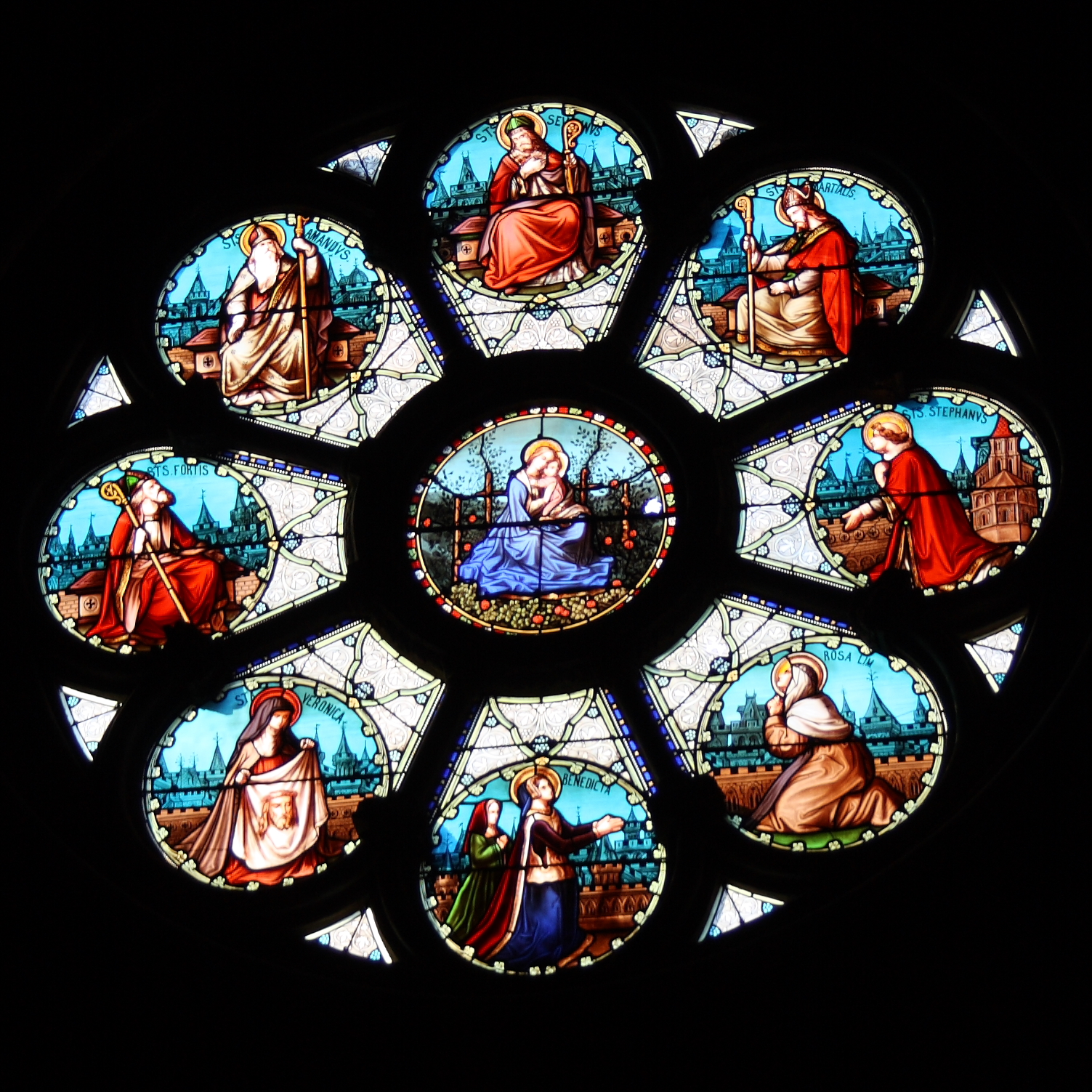
Grand Glass, Left Side of the Nave, representation of saints around the Virgin

=== 20th century ===
After it was classified as an historic monument on the List of 1840, it was then inscribed as a UNESCO World Heritage Site in 1998 due to it being the head of one of the Ways of Saint James of Compostela.

== Medieval furnishings ==
Like many churches, the Basilica of Saint Severinus was largely stripped of its medieval furnishings. Despite this, some elements remain such as a number of alabaster altar pieces from the 15th century. One of them, dedicated to the life of the Virgin, remains in the Chapel of the Madonna of the Rose. Another is the one at the main altar which depicts the story of Saint Severinus and the legend of the Staff of Saint Martial.

The church has also retained an ornate 15th-century episcopal pulpit that still has its armrests, backrest and dais. This is a very significant item as it is reserved for a new archbishop of Bordeaux who before he is installed must take an oath on the relics of Saint Severinus.

The choir still houses thirty-two of the forty-seven stalls from the 15th century. These stalls were intended for the chapter. They are decorated with images of saints, prophets and satirical scenes.

The Basilica of Saint Severinus has a number of well-maintained medieval statues. Among them, are the 13th-century Our Lady of Glad Tidings, the 14th-century alabaster Our Lady of the Rose and one of Saint Martial.

Even though Roland's Oliphant (mentioned earlier) was still in the basilica as late as the 17th century, it disappeared before the Revolution.

== Crypts ==
=== Church crypt ===
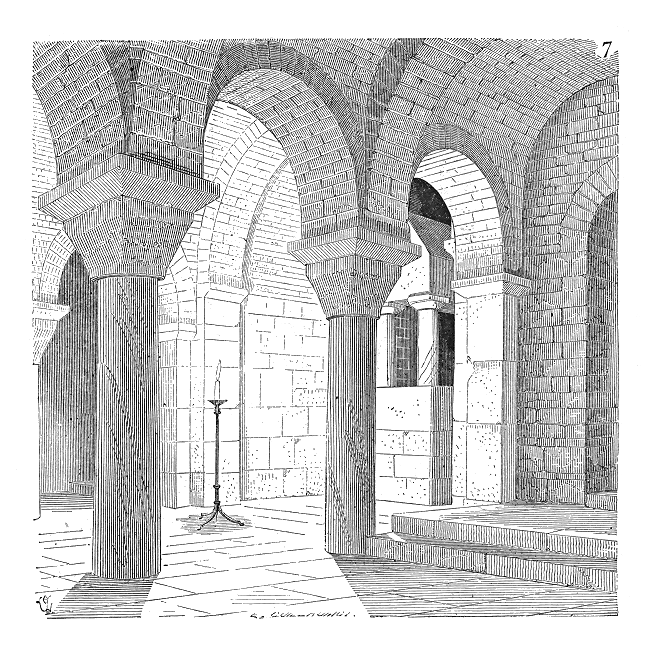
Crypt containing the sarcophagus of a saint.

The original crypt was located in a 5th-century building. Its later use as a funerary basilica is attested to by the presence of sarcophagi which supposedly contained the remains of early bishops.

In 1635, the Carolingian apse in the basilica was removed to allow for the creation three recesses for the sarcophagi and the cenotaph of Saint Fort. At the time, this martyr was the object of a cult that lasted until recently. In fact, every May 16 mothers led their sons to the grave of Saint Fort to get "fortified".

=== Archaeological crypt ===
The archaeological crypt is a vestige of early Christian cemetery and is one of the oldest in Bordeaux. It was situated between Place des Martyrs de la Resistance and Rue Judaïque. According to tradition, the necropolis at Saint Severinus was consecrated by Christ and seven bishops. The tradition also states that many of the rulers of Roncevaux are buried there. This would explain why this place was a magnet for pilgrims in the Middle Ages.

From 1909 to 1910 excavations were conducted south of the church by Paul Courteault. In part of the necropolis superimposed graves were discovered that dated from the 4th to 13th centuries. In the late 1950s and then from 1964 to 1969, Raymond Duru campaigned to get the crypt open to the public. Thanks to his efforts, it has been publicly accessible since the 1980s.

== Today ==
The basilica has benefited from restoration in recent decades. The roofs were redone, as were upper parts of the basilica. The chapels of Madonna of the Rose and Saint John as well as the choir were restored.

In 2005, the Gothic entrance benefitted from a restoration funded by the city of Bordeaux and Historic Monuments. During this restoration, that traces of the original polychrome were discovered. This important discovery gives the visitor a sense of how the entrance would have looked in its original state.
