= Musée des Jacobins =

Musée des Jacobins may refer to:

- Musée des Jacobins (Auch)
- Musée des Jacobins (Morlaix)
- Musée des Jacobins (Saint-Sever)
- Musée des Jacobins (Toulouse)
