= Saint-Sever Beatus =

11th-century illuminated manuscript

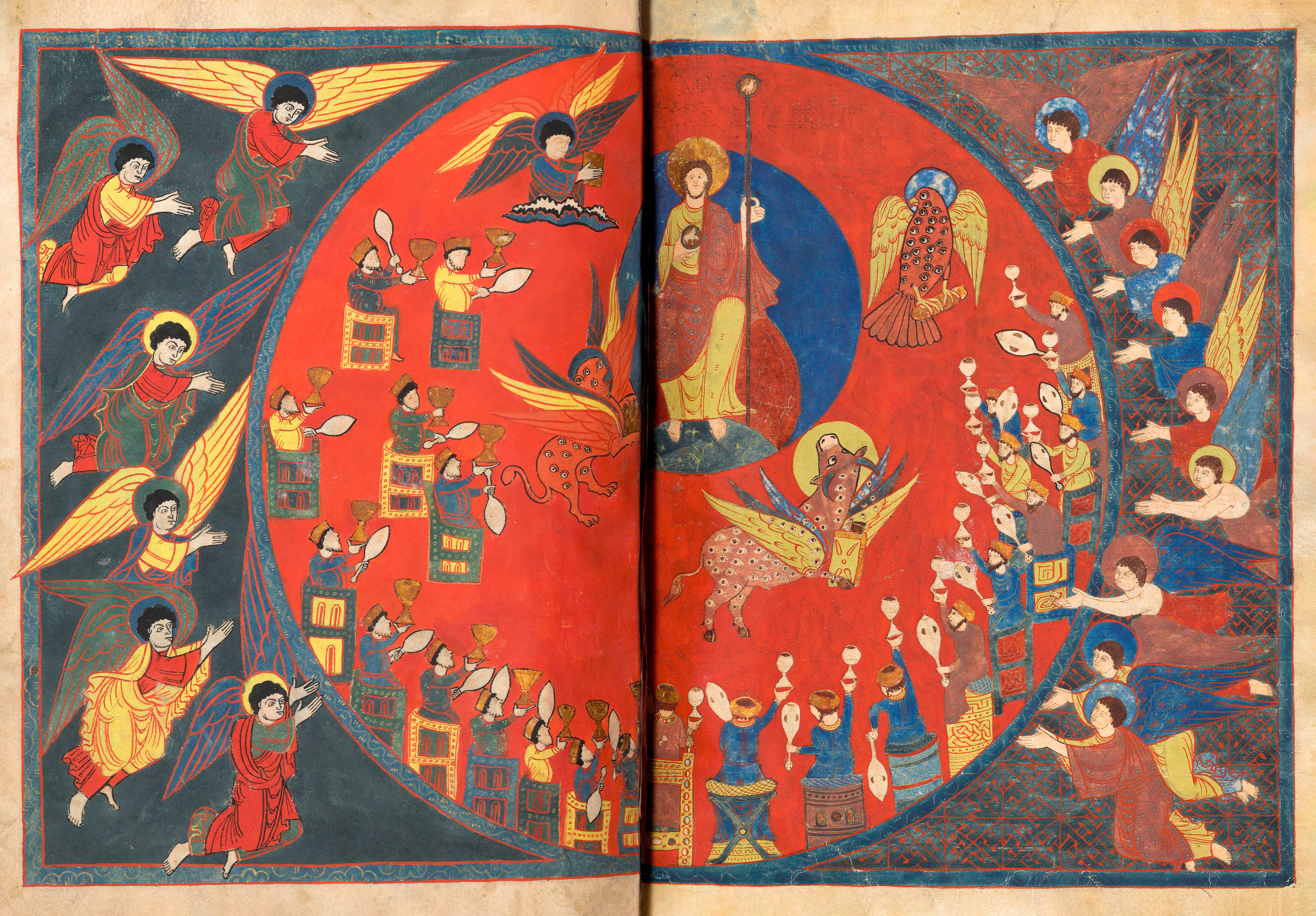
Beatus de Saint-Sever, Vision of the Son of Man. Paris, BNF, Ms. Lat. 8878, fols. 121v-122r

The Saint-Sever Beatus, also known as the Apocalypse of Saint-Sever (Paris, Bibliothèque Nationale, MS lat. 8878), is a Romanesque Illuminated manuscript from the 11th century. The manuscript was made at Saint-Sever Abbey, then in the Duchy of Gascony, under the direction of Gregory of Montaner, abbot between 1028 and 1072. It is believed that the primary artist-scribe who illustrated the manuscript was Stephanus Garsia (who signed his name on folio 6), working alongside other unnamed individuals.

The manuscript contains the Commentary on the Apocalypse of Beatus of Liébana, a commentary on Daniel by Saint Jerome and a treatise on the Virgin Mary by Saint Ildefonsus. Parts of it are displayed in the Musée des Jacobins in Saint-Sever.

== Gallery ==
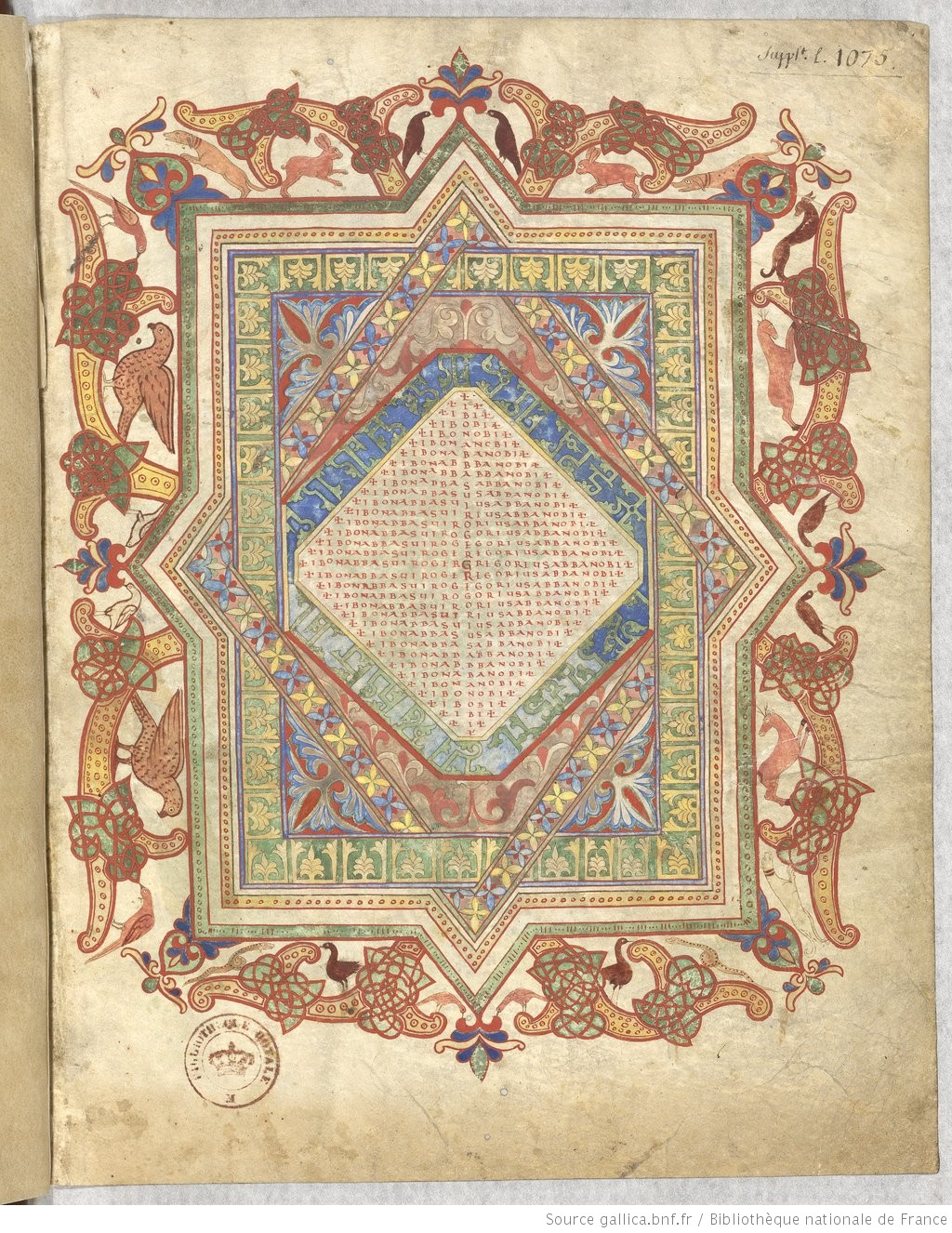
Frontispiece of the Beatus

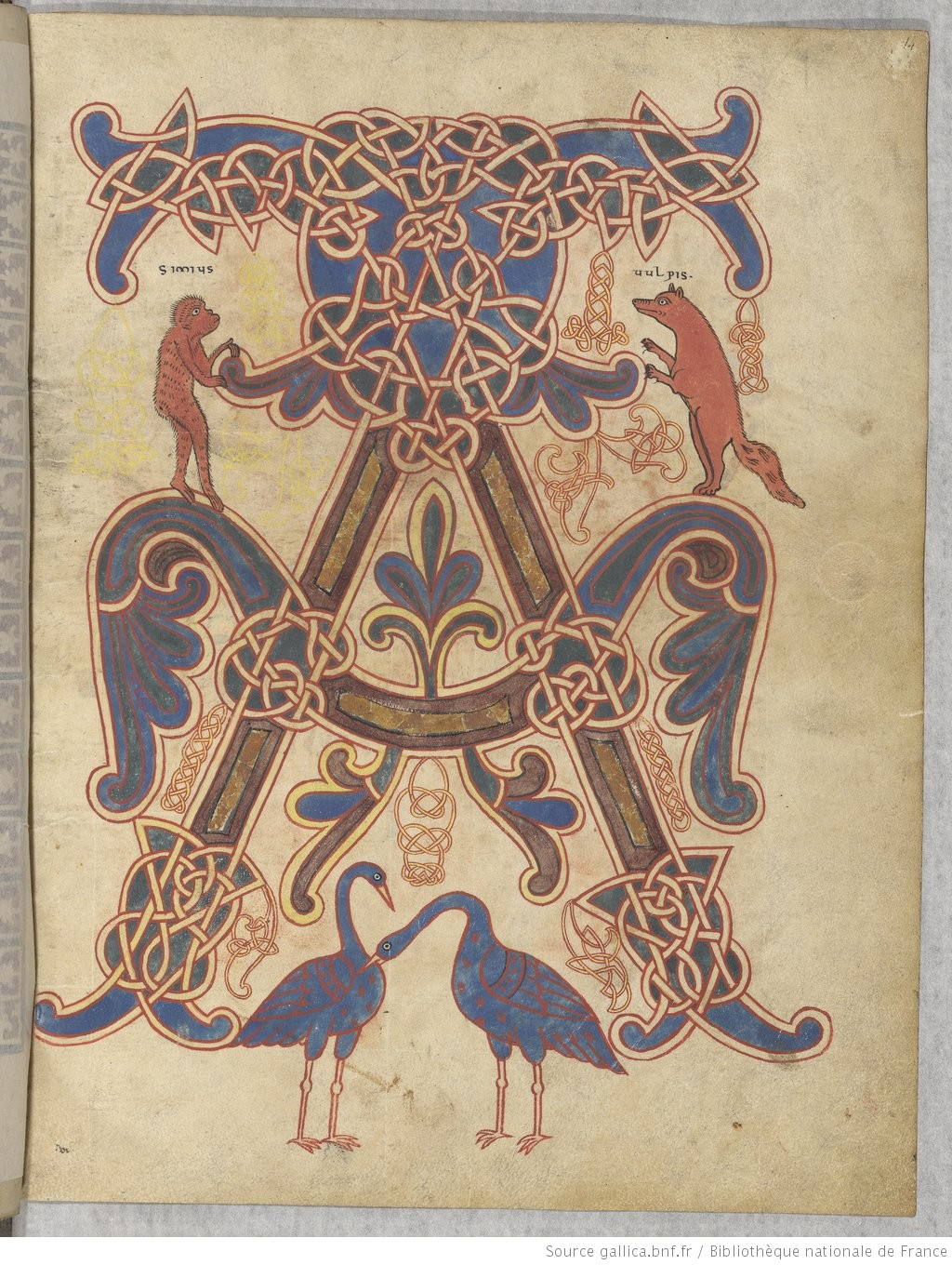
Decorated initial

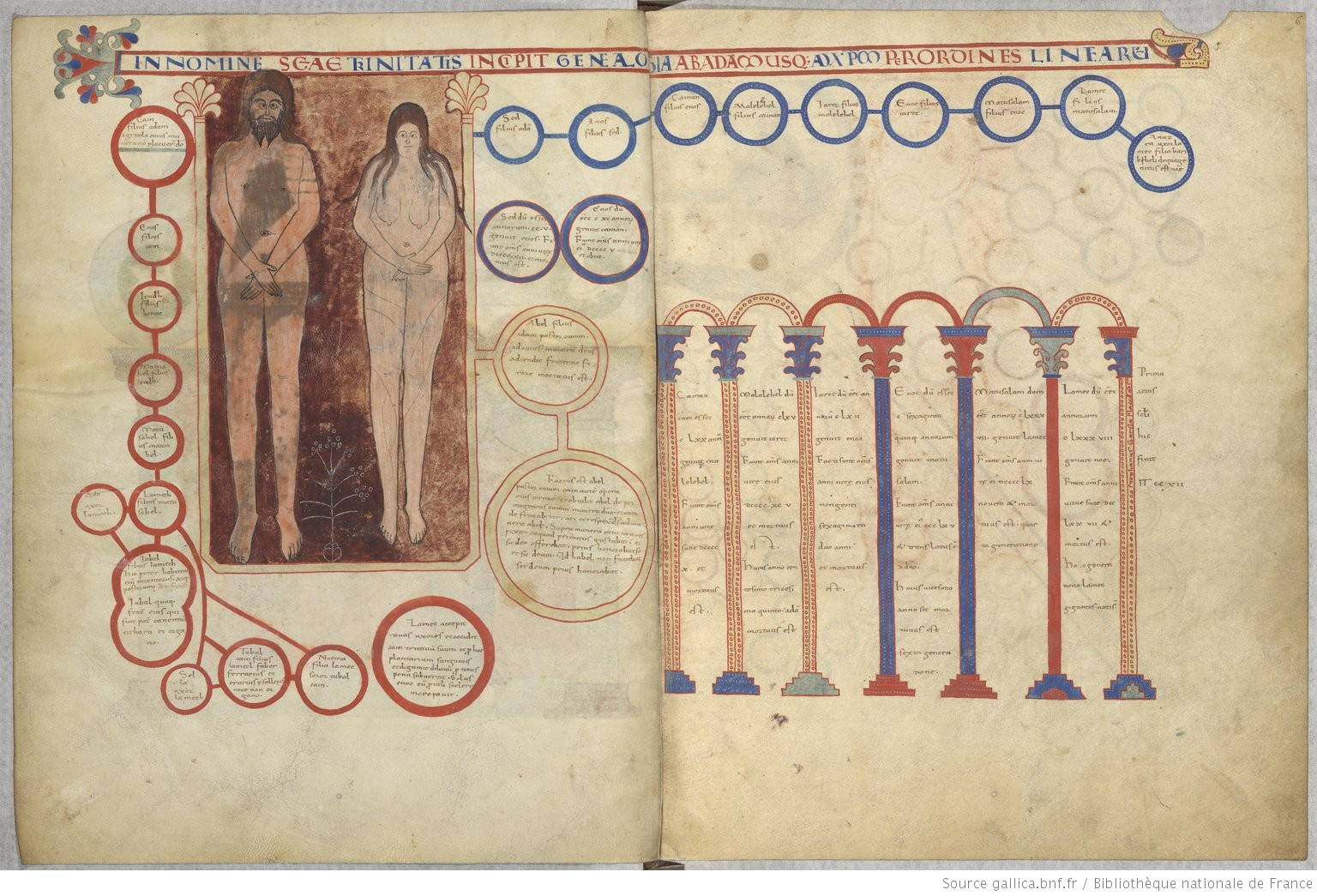
Genealogy of Jesus Christ

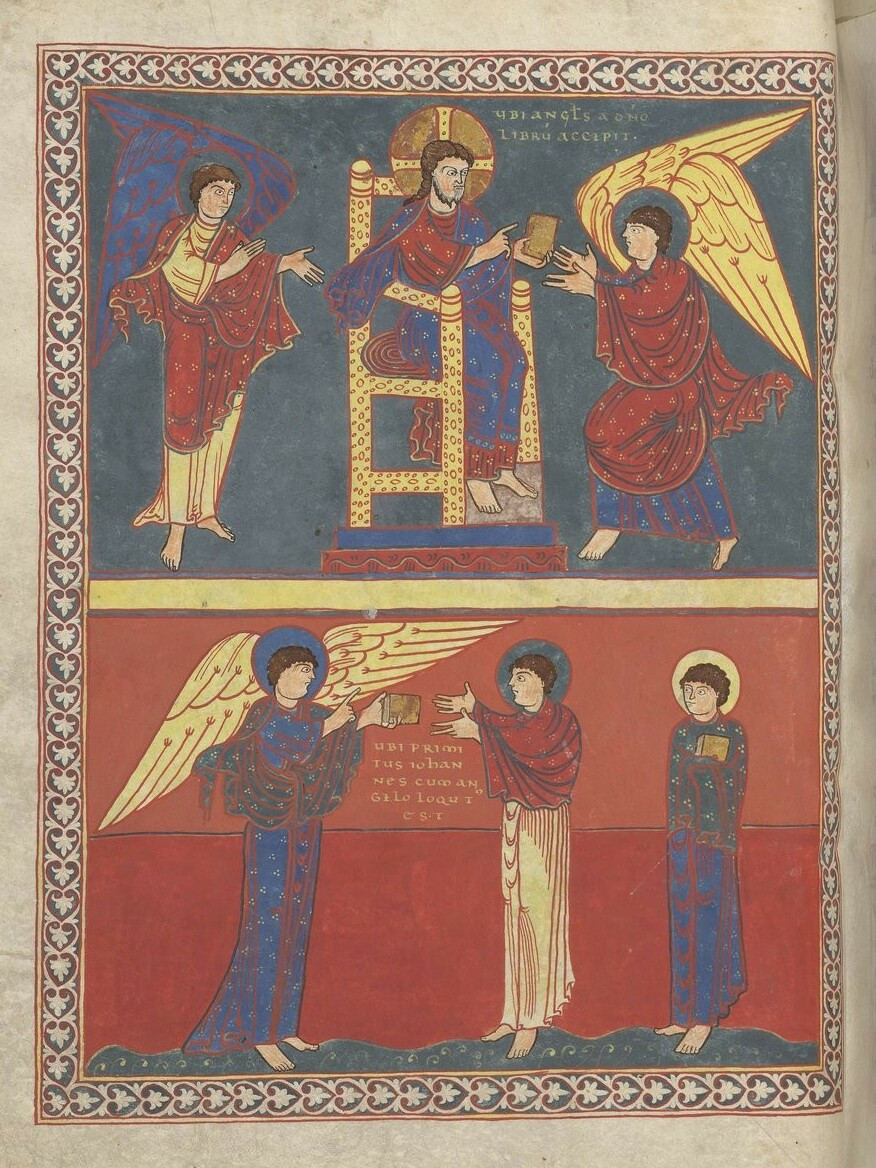
Angel transmitting the revelation of the apocalypse to John

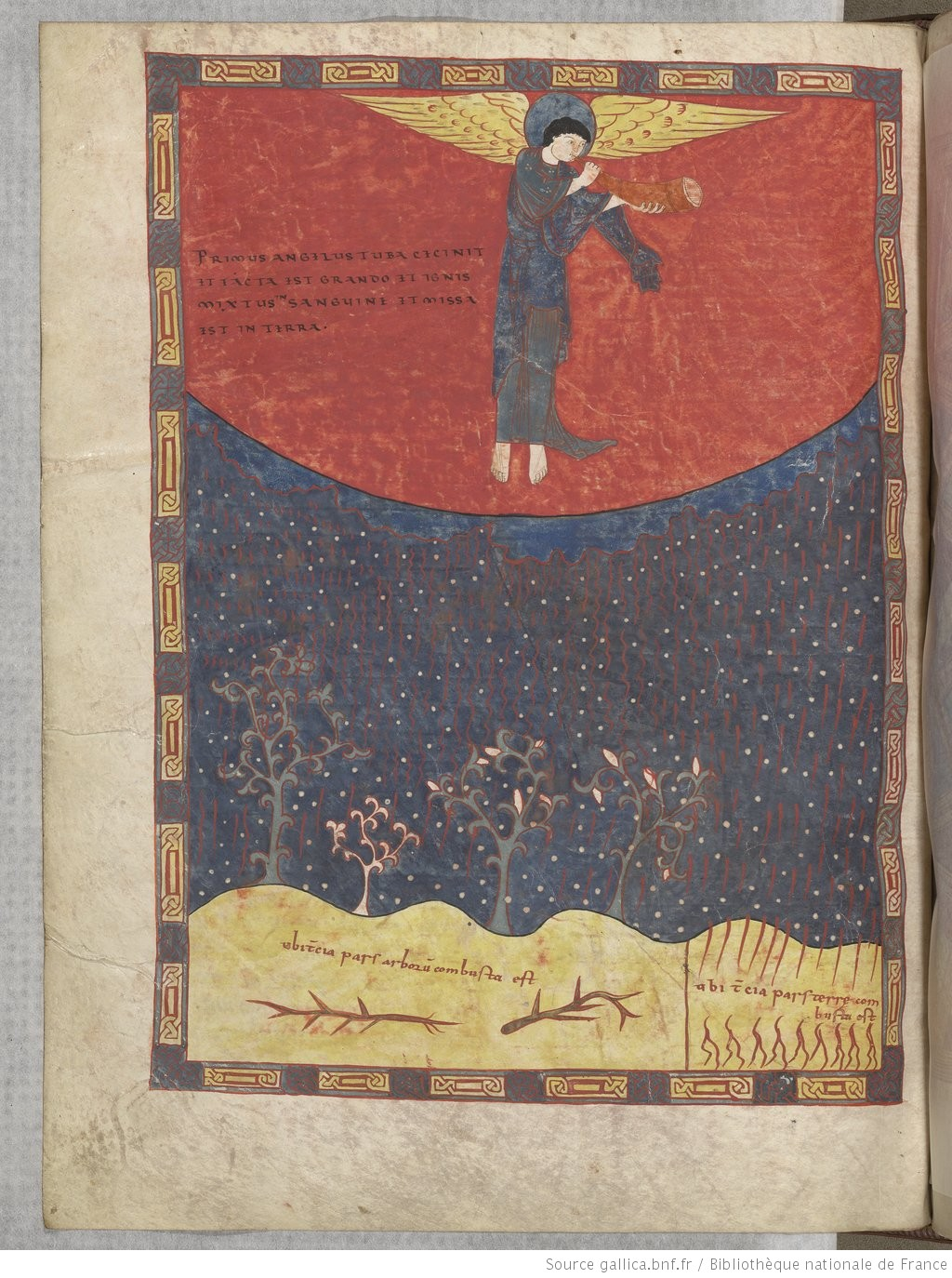
Rain of fire and blood

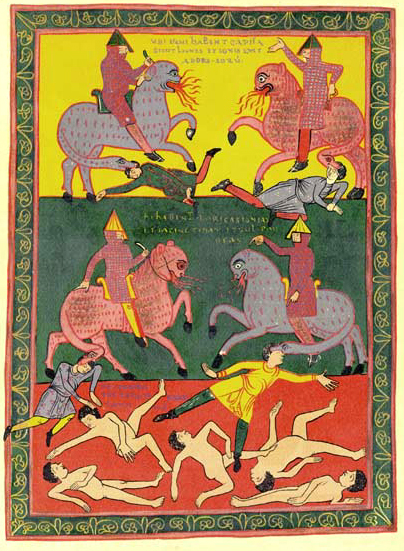
Four Horsemen

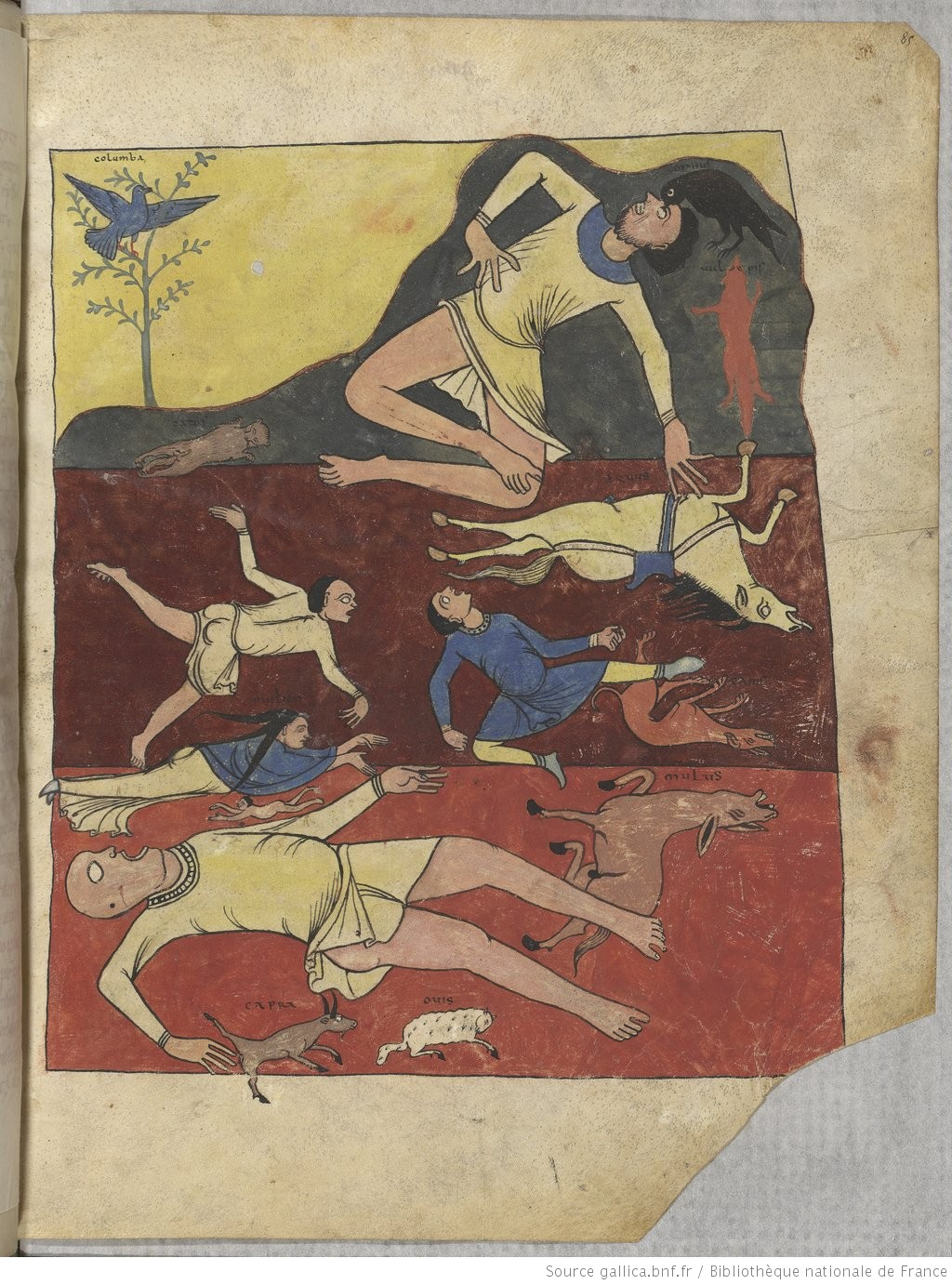
The Deluge

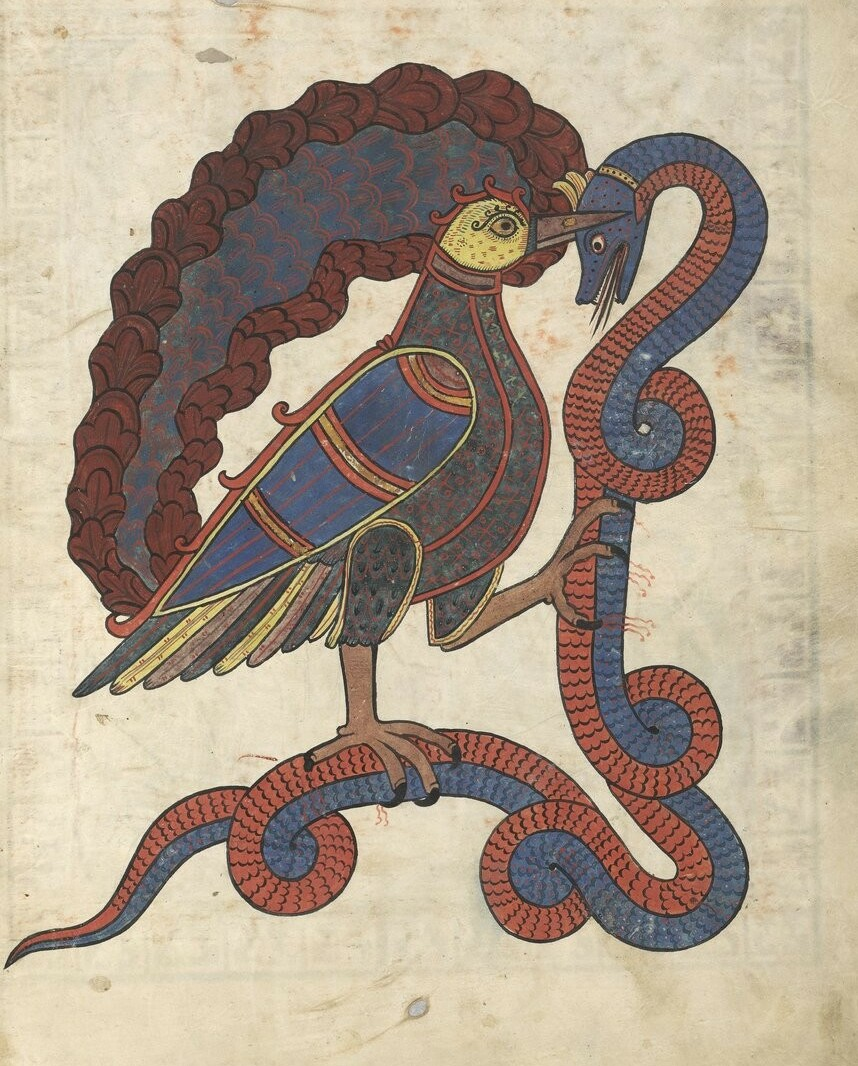
Bird victorious over the serpent

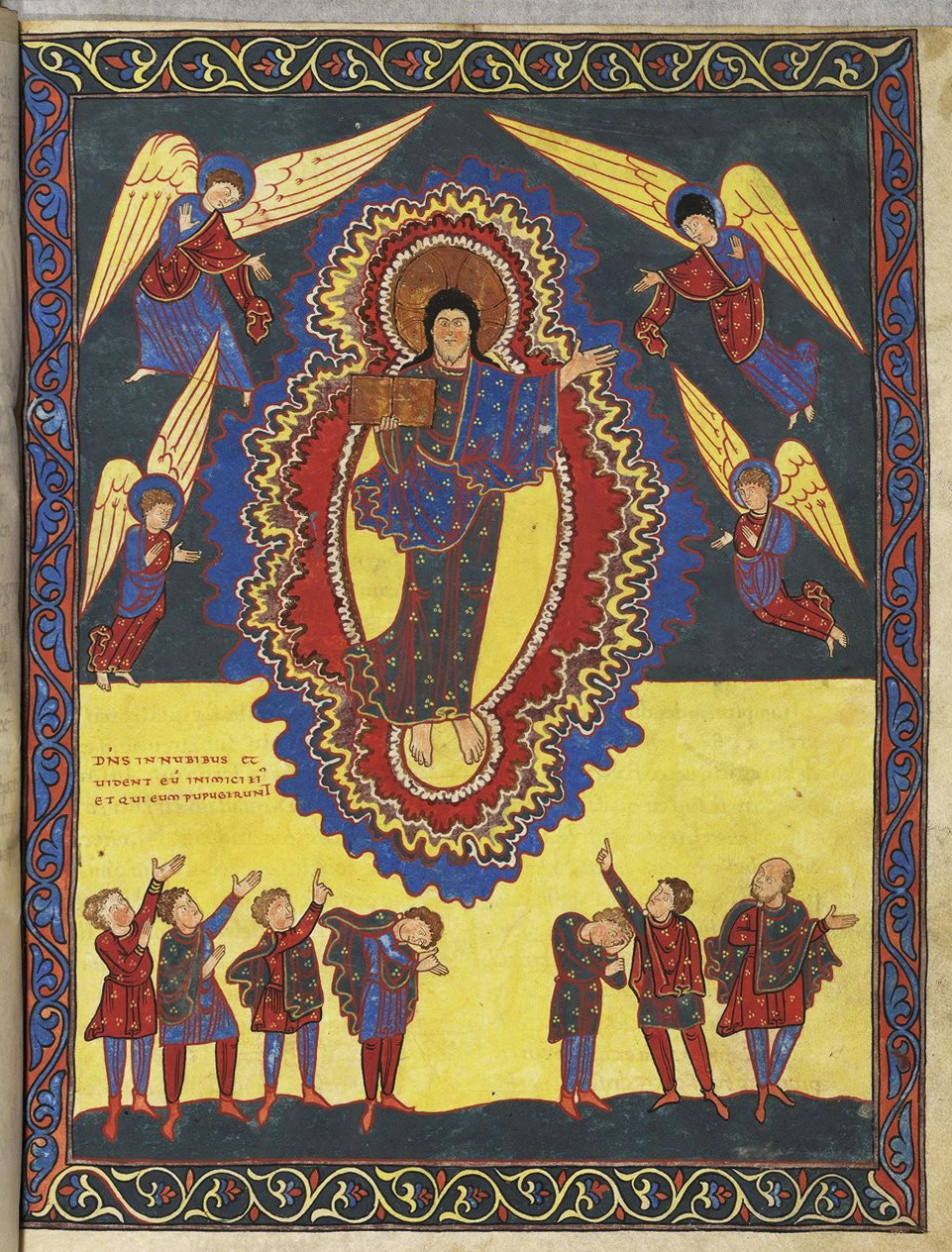
Christ in Majesty

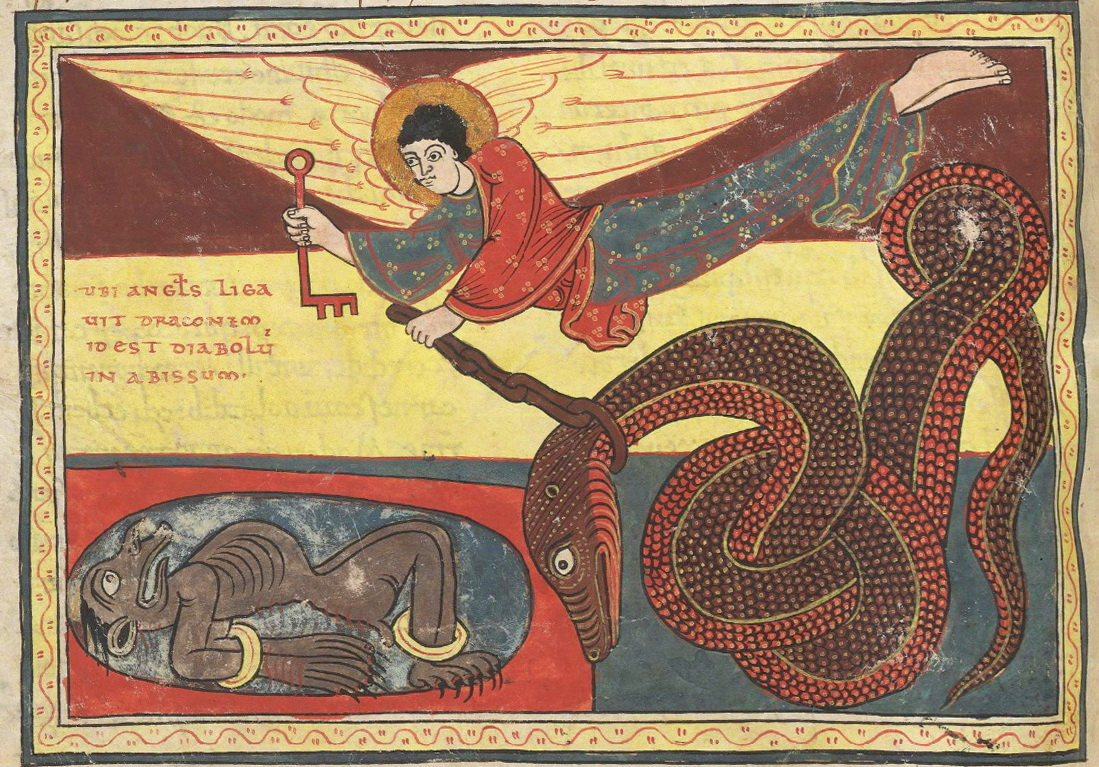
Angel throwing a dragon into the abyss
