= Basilica of St. Michael, Bordeaux =

Flamboyant Gothic church in Bordeaux, France

Basilica of Saint Michael of Bordeaux
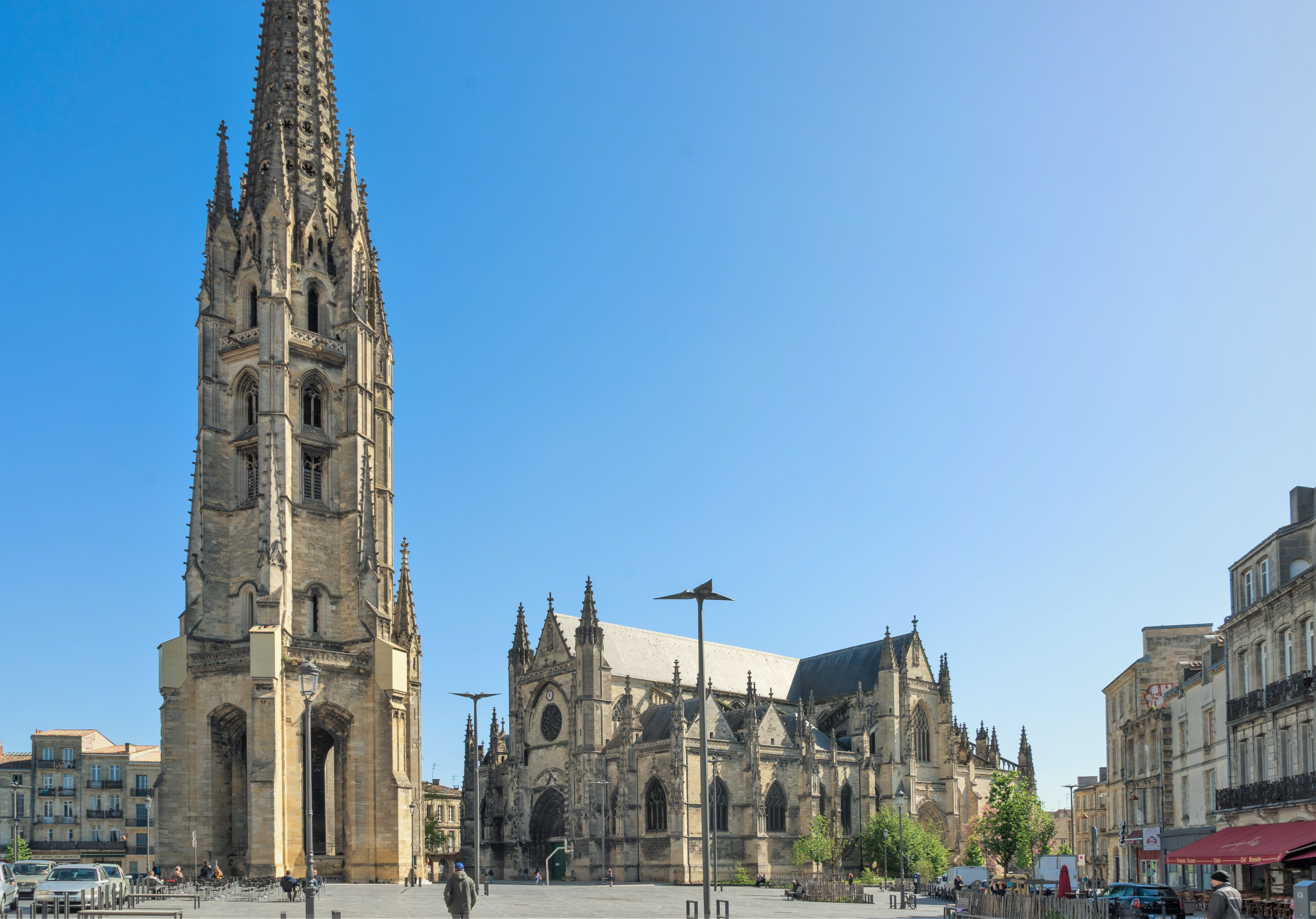

Religion
- Affiliation: Roman Catholic
- Diocese: Roman Catholic Archdiocese of Bordeaux

Location
- Location: Bordeaux, Gironde, Nouvelle-Aquitaine, France
- Interactive map of Basilica of Saint Michael of Bordeaux
- Coordinates: 44.83438°N 0.56506°W

Architecture
- Type: Minor basilica
- Style: Gothic
- Spire height: 114 metres (374 ft)

UNESCO World Heritage Site
- Official name: Part of Routes of Santiago de Compostela in France
- Criteria: Cultural: (ii), (iv), (vi)
- Reference: 868
- Inscription: 1998 (22nd Session)

The Basilica of St Michael (Basilique Saint-Michel, in French), is a Flamboyant Gothic church in Bordeaux, France.

In 1998, UNESCO designated the Routes of Santiago de Compostela in France as a World Heritage Site, including the three main churches of Bordeaux : the basilica of St Severinus, the basilica of St Michael and the cathedral of St Andrew.

== History ==
The basilica was built between the end of 14th century and the 16th century. It is at the heart of the ancient quarter of Saint-Michel.

The church has been listed in the Inventory of Historic Monuments since 1846, minor basilica since 1903, and World Heritage Site since 1998.

== Description ==
The pulpit represents Saint Michael slaying the dragon. The stained-glass windows were destroyed during the bombardment of 1940.

The separate bell tower, which is 114 meters tall, was built in the 15th century. The tower can be visited every day from April to October.

== Legend of the mummies ==
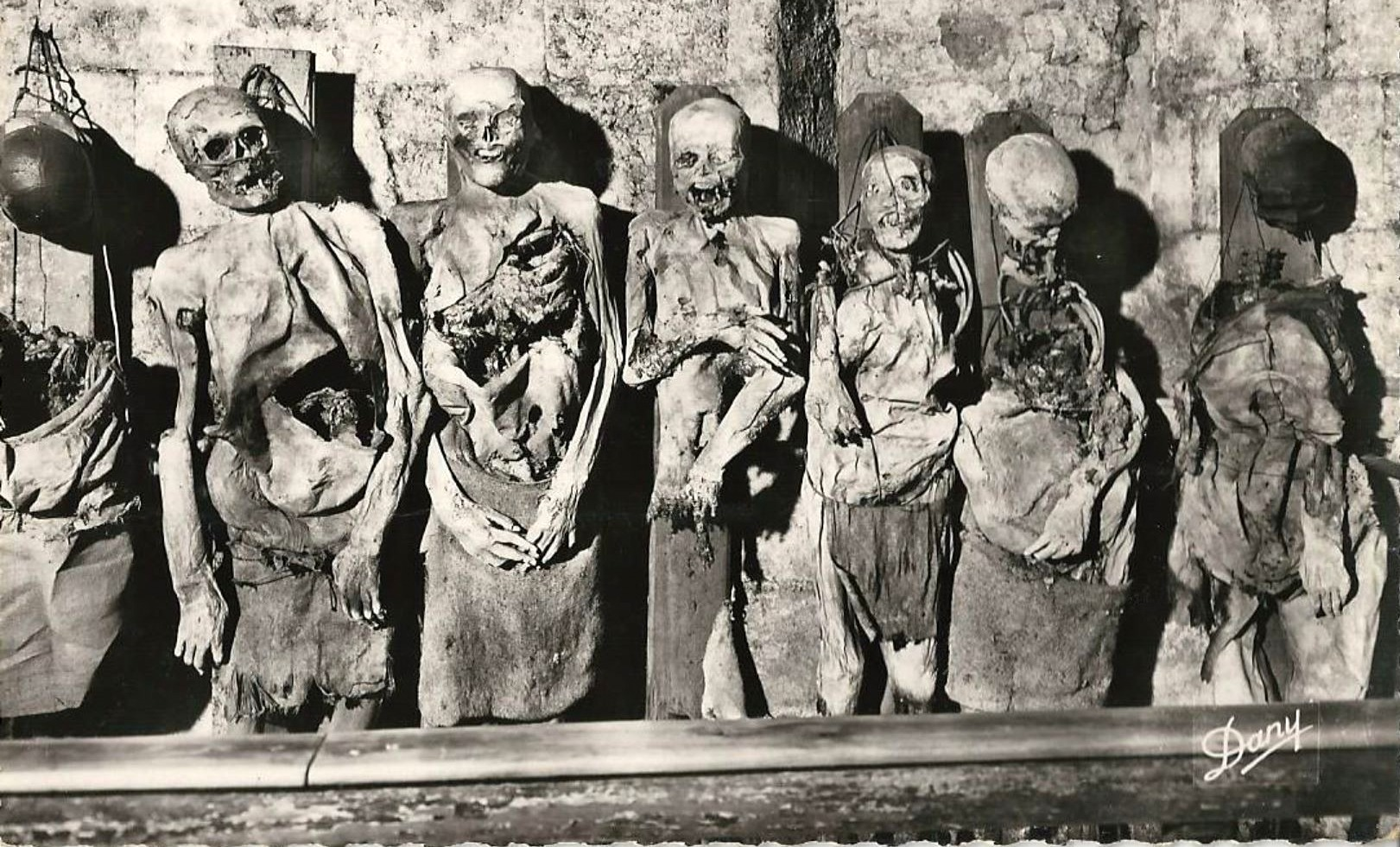
The mummies

From the late eighteenth century until 1979, over 60 of the mummified bodies were exhibited in the crypt.

In 1881 a Gallo-Roman cemetery and catacombs were discovered under the tower, with several naturally mummified bodies (see note). The church is a listed historical monument.

The mummies were found in 1791 according to other sources, in the adjacent parish graveyard which, having become full, was being cleared, with remains being transferred to catacombs; they further state that the bodies were removed to the cimetière de la Chartreuse in 1979.

== Gallery ==
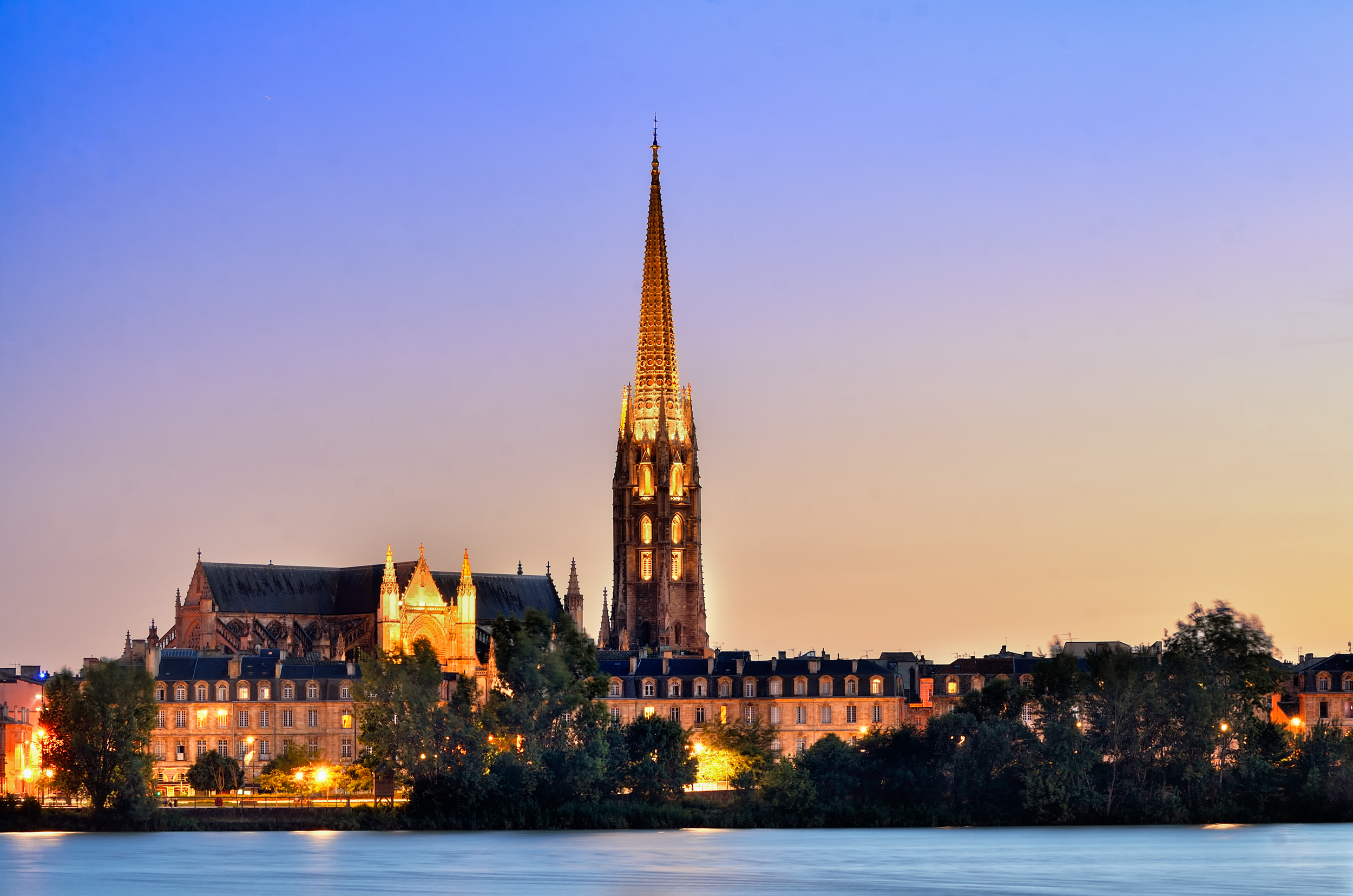
By night, view from the river Garonne

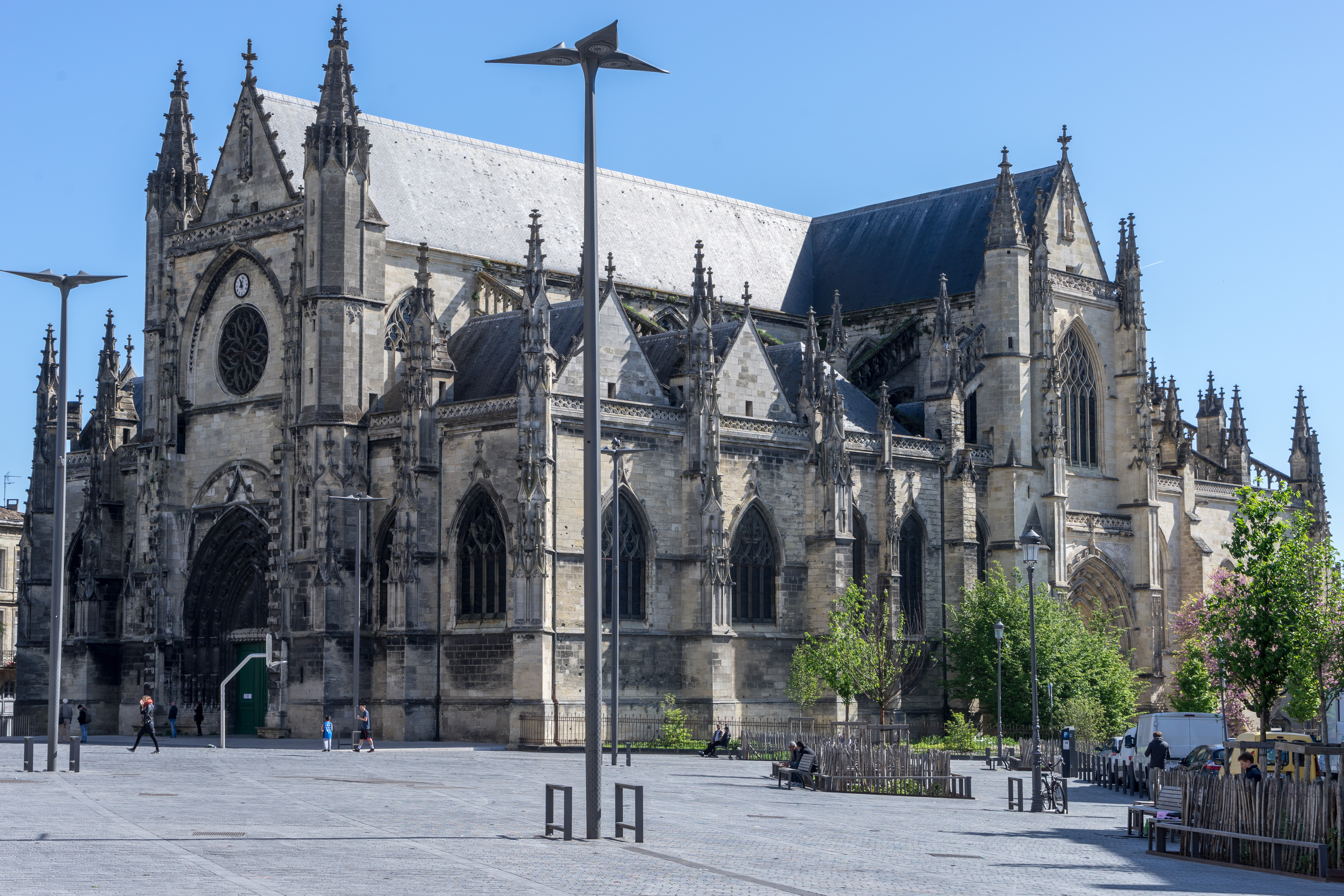
Outside view

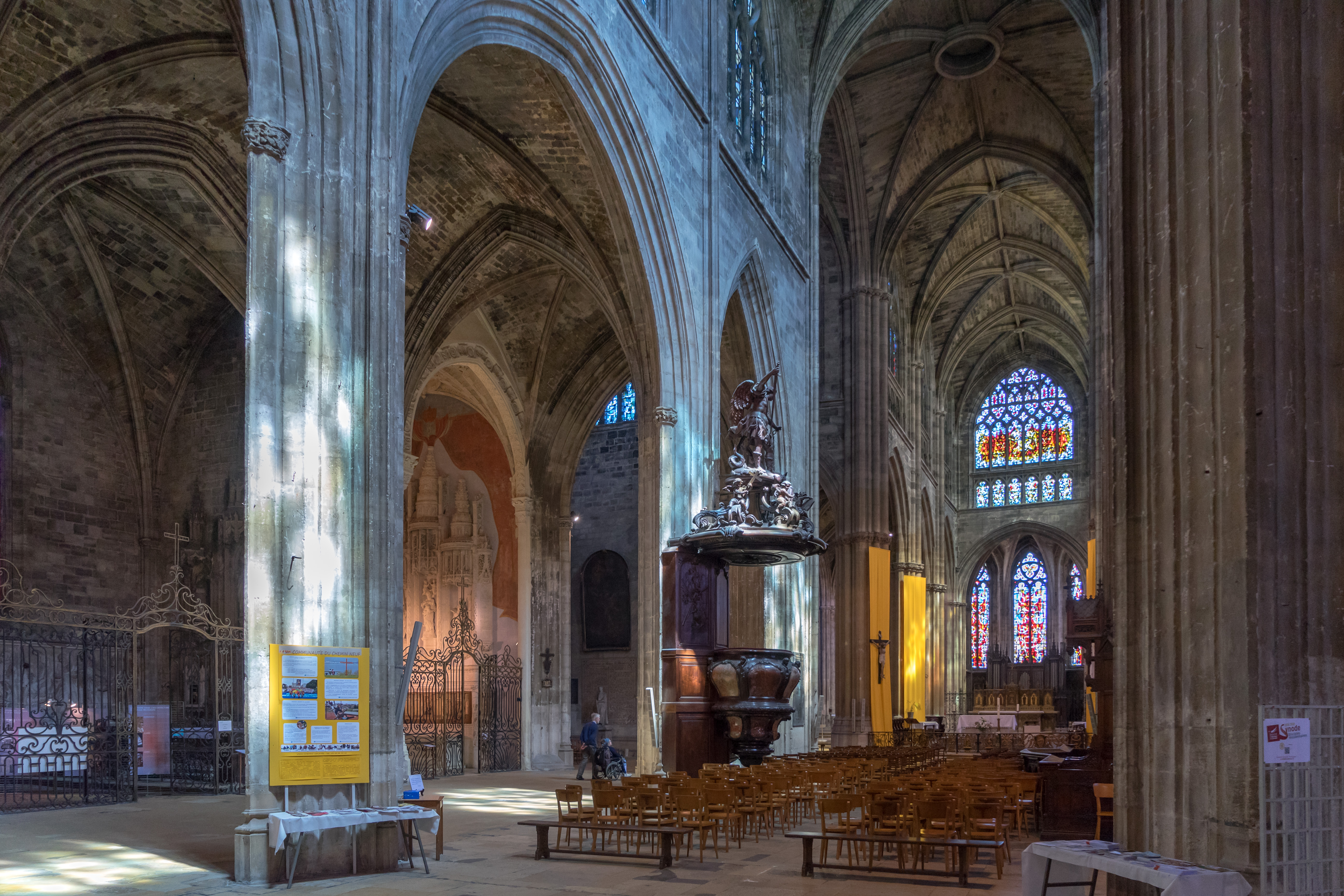
The nave

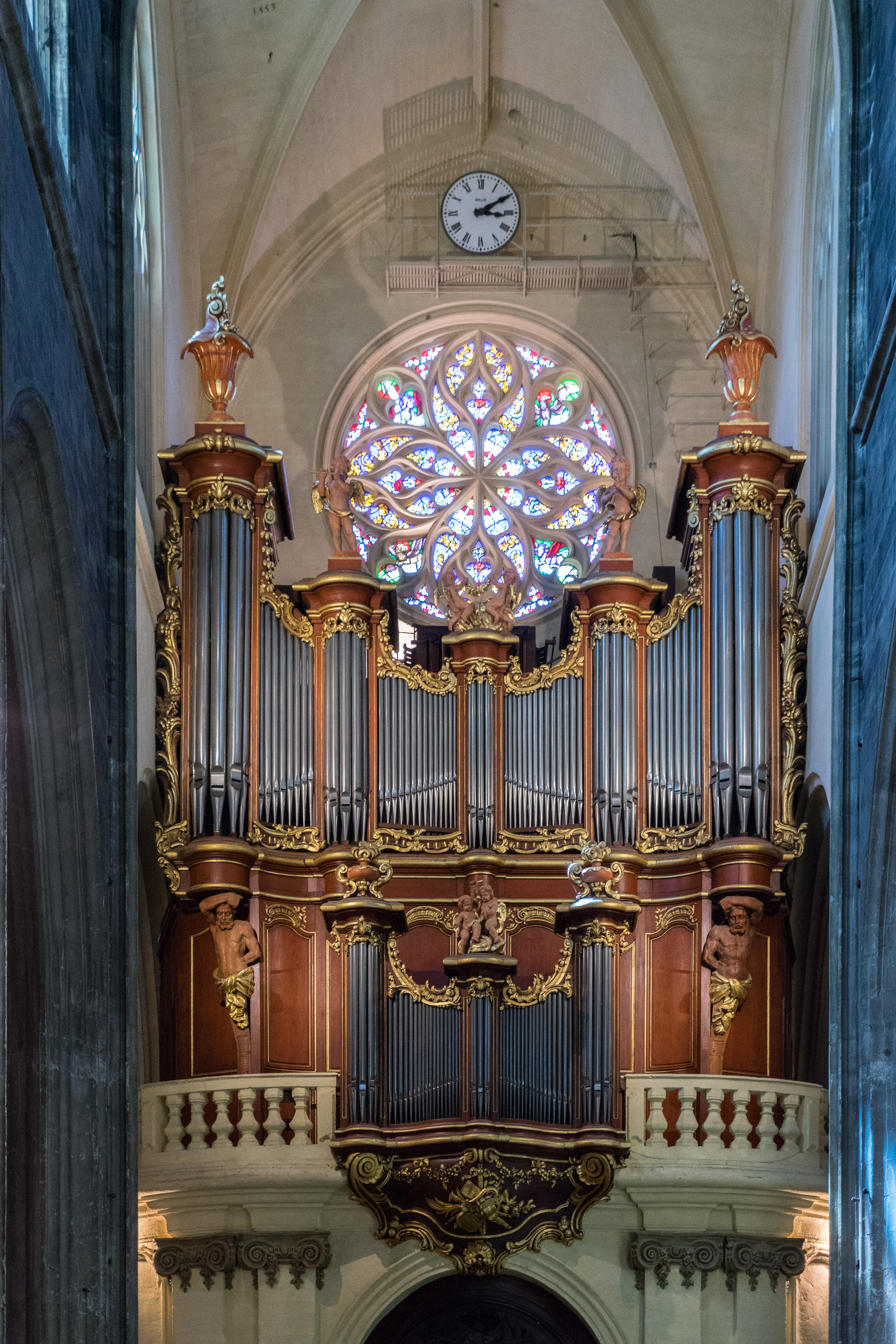
The organ
