= L'Hôpital-Saint-Blaise =

L'Hôpital-Saint-Blaise Ospitalepea
- Commune
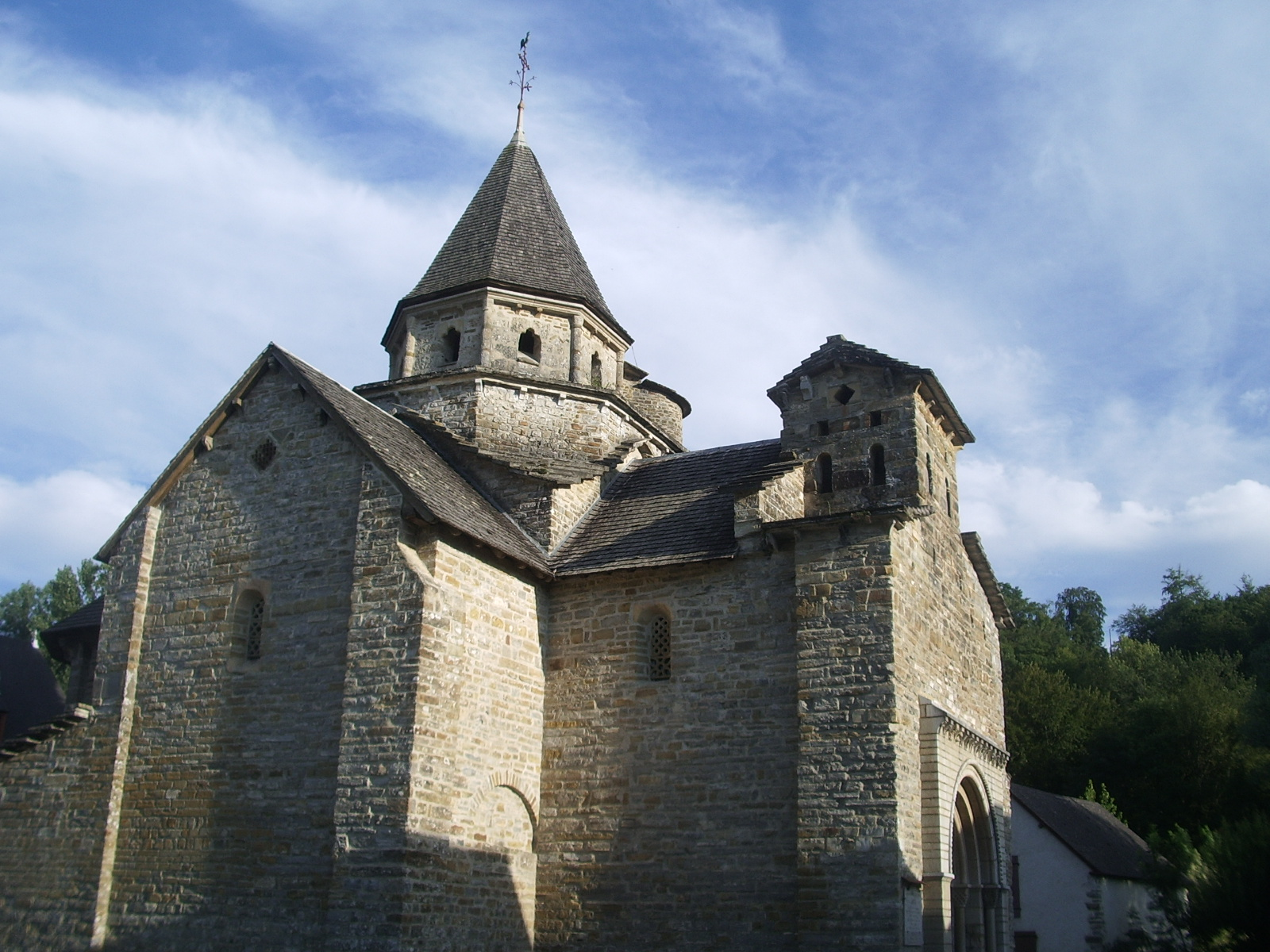
- 12th-century Romanesque church
- Location of L'Hôpital-Saint-Blaise
- Location within France Location within Nouvelle-Aquitaine
- Coordinates: 43°15′09″N 0°46′03″W
- Country: France
- Region: Nouvelle-Aquitaine
- Department: Pyrénées-Atlantiques
- Arrondissement: Oloron-Sainte-Marie
- Canton: Montagne Basque
- Intercommunality: CA Pays Basque

Government
  - Mayor (2020–2026): Dominique Uthurralt
- Area^{1}: 2.11 km^{2} (0.81 sq mi)
- Elevation: 159 m (522 ft)
- Highest elevation: 254 m (833 ft)
- Lowest elevation: 147 m (482 ft)
- Population (2023): 55
  - Density: 26/km^{2} (68/sq mi)
- Time zone: UTC+01:00 (CET)
  - Summer (DST): UTC+02:00 (CEST)
- INSEE/Postal code: 64264 /64130
- ^{1} French Land Register data, which excludes lakes, ponds, glaciers > 1 km^{2} (0.386 sq mi or 247 acres) and river estuaries.

L'Hôpital-Saint-Blaise (French pronunciation: [lopital sɛ̃ blɛz]; Basque: Ospitalepea; Occitan: L'Hospital) is a commune in the Pyrénées-Atlantiques département in south-western France.

It is located in the historical province of Soule.

== Sights ==
The 12th-century Romanesque church of L'Hôpital-Saint-Blaise has been listed as a UNESCO World Heritage Site as part of the World Heritage Sites of the Routes of Santiago de Compostela in France.

== See also ==
- Communes of the Pyrénées-Atlantiques department
