= Routes of Santiago de Compostela in France =

Sections of the Way of St. James in France part of the World Heritage Site in France

Routes of Santiago de Compostela in France Routes de St-Jacques de Compostelle en France
UNESCO World Heritage Site

- Location within Earth
- Location: France
- Includes: 71 structures (churches, abbeys, etc) and 7 stretches of road
- Criteria: Cultural: (ii), (iv), (vi)
- Reference: 868
- Inscription: 1998 (22nd Session)
- Area: 97.21 ha (240.2 acres)
- Coordinates: 45°11′2.6″N 0°43′22.6″W

UNESCO designated the Routes of Santiago de Compostela in France as a World Heritage Site in December 1998. The routes pass through the following regions of France: Aquitaine, Auvergne, Basse-Normandie, Bourgogne, Centre, Champagne-Ardenne, Ile-de-France, Languedoc-Roussillon, Limousin, Midi-Pyrénées, Picardie, Poitou-Charentes, and Provence-Alpes-Côte d'Azur. UNESCO cites the routes' role in "religious and cultural exchange", the development of "specialized edifices" along the routes, and their "exceptional witness to the power and influence of Christian faith among people of all classes and countries in Europe during the Middle Ages".

UNESCO designated 71 structures along the routes and seven stretches of the Chemin du Puy as a World Heritage Site. The structures are largely monuments, churches, or hospitals that provided services to pilgrims headed to Santiago de Compostela in Spain. Some are places of pilgrimage in their own right. Other structures include a tower, a bridge, and a city gate.

== Structures ==
The sites included in the UNESCO designation are largely monuments, churches, or hospitals that provided services to pilgrims headed to Santiago de Compostela in Spain. Some are places of pilgrimage in their own right. Other structures include a tower, bridges, a city gate, and a prehistoric stone construction. When UNESCO designates monuments as World Heritage Sites, this often leads to an increase in tourism that challenges the abilities of local communities to continue protecting the sites themselves.

=== Auvergne-Rhône-Alpes ===
1. Clermont-Ferrand: church Notre-Dame du Port
2. Le Puy-en-Velay: cathedral
3. Le Puy-en-Velay: Hôtel-Dieu Saint-Jacques

=== Bourgogne-Franche-Comté ===
1. La Charité-sur-Loire: church Sainte-Croix-Notre-Dame
2. Asquins: church Saint-Jacques d'Asquins
3. Vézelay: former abbatial church Sainte-Madeleine

=== Centre-Val de Loire ===
1. Neuvy-Saint-Sépulchre: collegial church Saint-Étienne (formerly collegial church Saint-Jacques) – Centre-Val de Loire
2. Bourges: cathedral Saint-Étienne – Centre

=== Grand Est ===
1. L'Épine: Basilica Notre-Dame de l'Épine
2. Châlons-en-Champagne: church Notre-Dame-en-Vaux

=== Hauts-de-France ===
1. Amiens: cathedral Notre-Dame
2. Compiègne: parochial church Saint-Jacques
3. Douai: Église Saint-Jacques de Douai
4. Folleville: parochial church Saint-Jean-Baptiste

=== Île-de-France ===
1. Paris: Saint-Jacques Tower – Île-de-France

=== Normandy ===
1. Mont Saint-Michel – Lower Normandy

=== Nouvelle-Aquitaine ===
1. Périgueux: cathedral Saint-Front
2. Saint-Avit-Sénieur: church
3. Le Buisson-de-Cadouin: former abbaye
4. Bazas: former cathedral
5. Bordeaux: basilica of St. Severinus
6. Bordeaux: basilica of St. Michael
7. Bordeaux: cathedral of St. Andrew
8. La Sauve: abbey de La Sauve-Majeure
9. La Sauve-Majeure: church Saint-Pierre
10. Soulac-sur-Mer: church Notre-Dame-de-la-Fin-des-Terres
11. Aire-sur-l'Adour: church Sainte-Quitterie
12. Mimizan: bell tower
13. Sorde-l'Abbaye: abbey Saint-Jean
14. Saint-Sever: abbey
15. Agen: cathedral Saint Caprais
16. Bayonne: cathedral Sainte-Marie
17. L'Hôpital-Saint-Blaise: church
18. Saint-Jean-Pied-de-Port: gate Saint Jacques
19. Oloron-Sainte-Marie: church Sainte Marie
20. Saintes: church Sainte-Eutrope
21. Saint-Jean-d'Angély: royal abbey Saint-Jean-Baptiste
22. Melle: church Saint-Hilaire
23. Aulnay: church Saint-Pierre
24. Poitiers: church Saint-Hilaire-le-Grand
25. Pons: former hospital des Pèlerins
26. Saint-Léonard-de-Noblat: church Saint-Léonard

=== Occitanie ===
1. Saint-Guilhem-le-Désert: former abbey de Gellone
2. Aniane/Saint-Jean-de-Fos: Pont du Diable
3. Saint-Gilles-du-Gard: former abbatial church
4. Audressein: church of Tramesaygues
5. Saint-Lizier: former cathedral and cloister, cathedral Notre-Dame-de-la-Sède, episcopal palace, rempart
6. Conques: Abbey Church of Saint Foy
7. Conques: bridge over the Dourdou
8. Espalion: Pont-Vieux
9. Estaing: bridge over the Lot
10. Saint-Chély-d'Aubrac: bridge called "des pèlerins " over the Boralde
11. Saint-Bertrand-de-Comminges: former cathedral Notre-Dame
12. Saint-Bertrand-de-Comminges: paleo-Christian basilica, chapel Saint-Julien
13. Toulouse: basilica Saint-Sernin
14. Toulouse: Hôtel-Dieu Saint-Jacques
15. Valcabrère: church Saint-Just
16. Auch: cathedral Sainte-Marie
17. Beaumont-sur-l'Osse and Larressingle: Pont d'Artigue or of Lartigue
18. La Romieu: collegial church Saint-Pierre
19. Cahors: cathedral Saint-Étienne
20. Cahors: Valentré Bridge
21. Gréalou: dolmen of Pech-Laglaire
22. Figeac: hospital Saint-Jacques
23. Rocamadour: church Saint-Sauveur and crypt Saint-Amadour
24. Aragnouet: hospice of the Plan and chapel Notre-Dame- de-l'Assomption, aka. chapelle des Templiers
25. Gavarnie: parochial church
26. Jézeau: church Saint-Laurent
27. Ourdis-Cotdoussan: church of Cotdussan
28. Rabastens: church Notre-Dame-du-Bourg
29. Moissac: abbey-church Saint-Pierre and cloister

=== Provence-Alpes-Côte d'Azur ===
1. Arles: Église Saint-Honorat
