= Musée des Jacobins (Saint-Sever) =

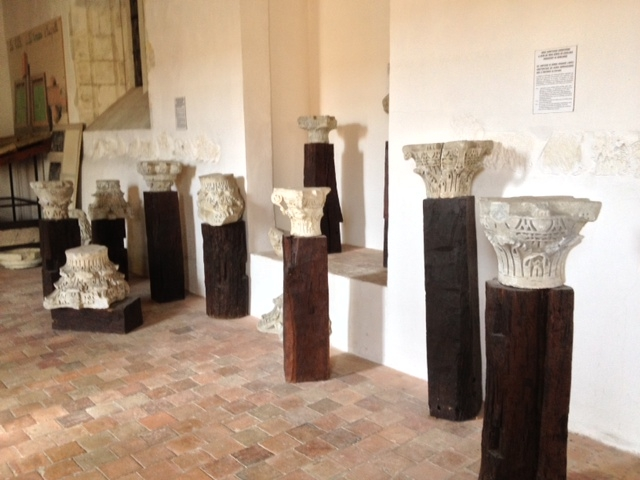
- Location: France
- Coordinates: 43°46′N 0°34′W
- Visitors: 2,400 (2018), 2,600 (2019), 3,000 (2021)
- Website: www.mahcapdegascogne.fr
- Location of Musée des Jacobins

The Musée des Jacobins is a museum in Saint-Sever, France, housed in part of the former Jacobin abbey in the town.

Its exhibits include several 4th- to 7th-century marble capitals from the 'butte de Morlane' and archaeological objects from the 4th-century Roman villa at Gleyzia d'Augreilh and the abbey itself, as well as a collection of historic postcards of Saint-Sever and the Saint-Sever Beatus, an 11th-century Benedictine illuminated manuscript from Saint-Sever Abbey and the only manuscript of its genre.

== Sources ==
- (in French) Saint-Sever, Cap de Gascogne, guide de découverte, édité par l'Office de tourisme du Cap de Gascogne
