= Joseph Villiet =

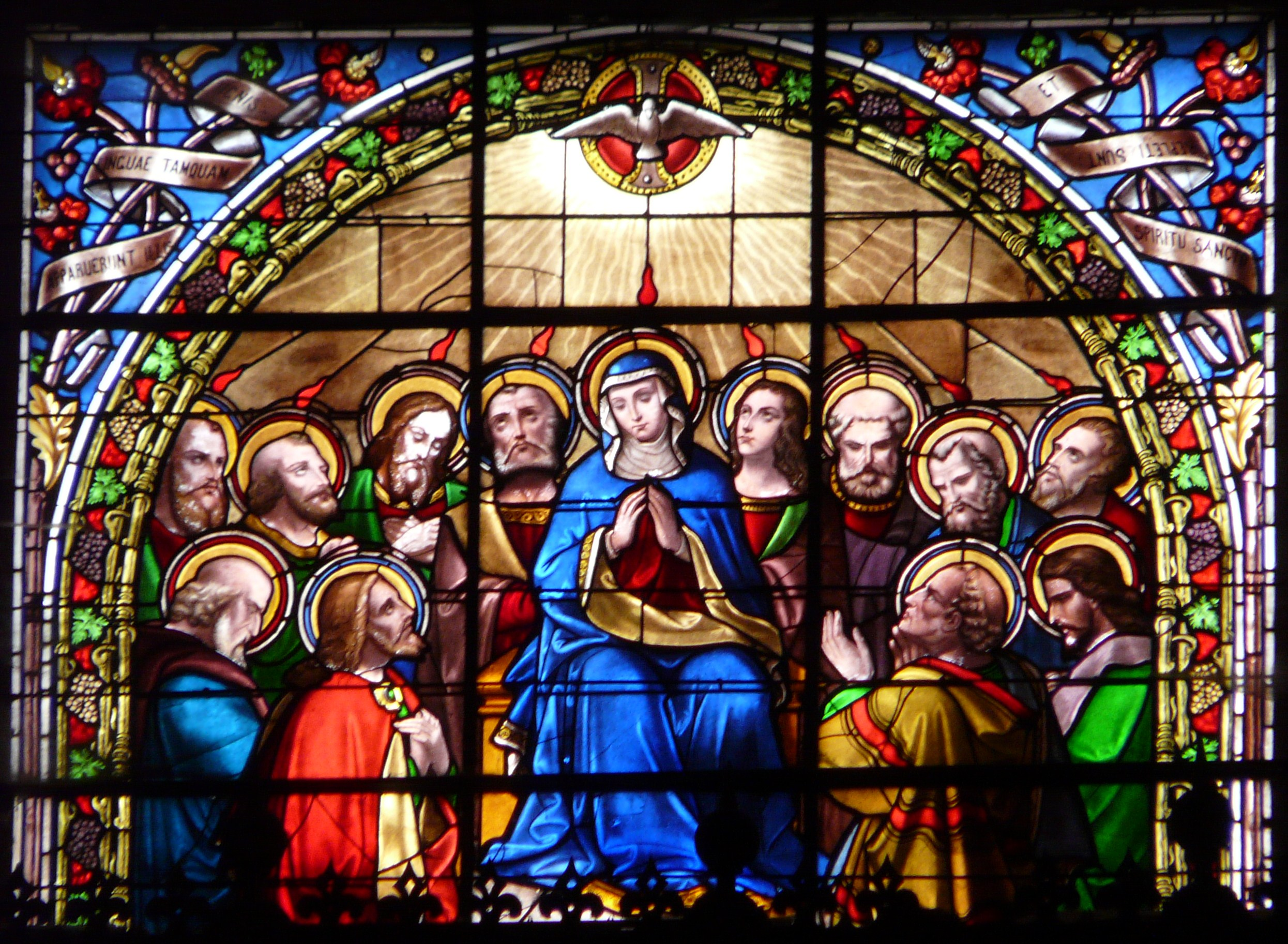

Joseph Villiet (August 10, 1823 – July 10, 1877) was a French master stained glass artist born in Ébreuil, France. He trained at the atelier of Émile Thibaud and Étienne Thevenot, at Clermont-Ferrand. In 1852, he relocated to Bordeaux where he worked until his death in 1877.

Villiet became a member of the Bordeaux Imperial Academy of Sciences, Literature and Arts in 1859. The same year, he published an essay on the history of murals in the academy's collections.

== Notable works ==
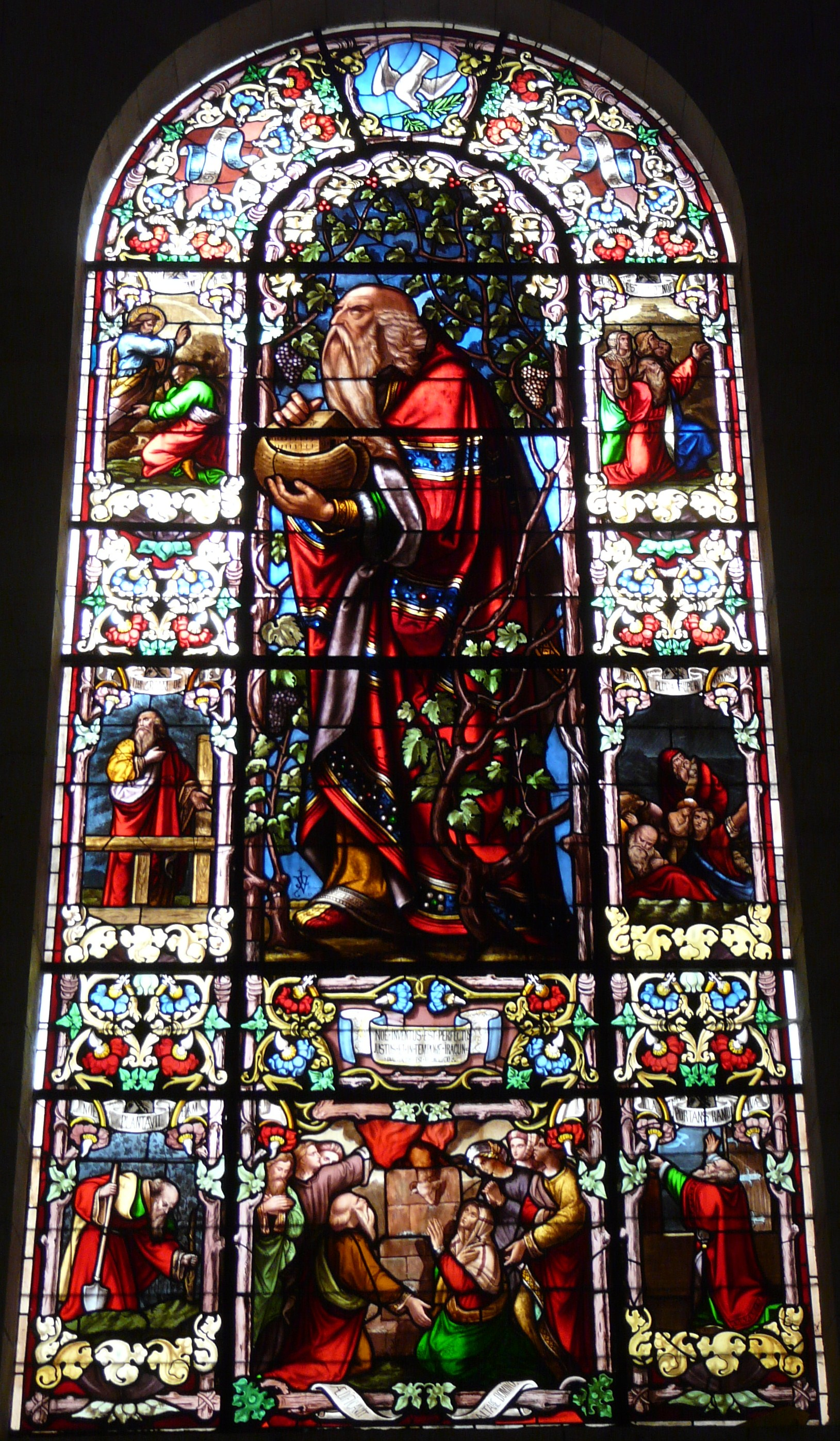
Representation of Noah, stained glass by Joseph Villiet, Saint-Nicolas de Nérac church.

Most of Villiet's stained glass work is found in southeast France, as well as in Allier, Loiret, Manche, Puy-de-Dôme, and Paris.

- Cathédrale Saint-André de Bordeaux : Multiple stained glass installations (chapels of Saint-Joseph, Notre-Dame du Mont-Carmel, de l'Annonciation, Sainte-Anne, Sainte-Marguerite, Saint-Charles-Borromée, du Sacré-Cœur)
- Cathédrale Saint-Étienne de Cahors
- Cathédrale Saint-Jean-Baptiste de Bazas (Gironde, 1852–1862)
- Église Notre-Dame de Nérac (Lot-et-Garonne).
- Église Saint-Nicolas de Nérac (Lot-et-Garonne, 1856–1868)
- Église d'Isle-Saint-Georges (Gironde)
- Église Saint-Joseph d'Albi
- Église Saint-Paulin de Carbon-Blanc (Gironde) : vitraux de la nef et des tribunes (1872-1877)
- Église Saint-Sauveur de Castelsarrasin (Tarn-et-Garonne)
- Prieuré de bénédictins de Marmande (Lot-et-Garonne)
