= Saint-Sever Abbey =

Abbey in Landes, France

Coordinates: 43.7597°N 0.5742°W

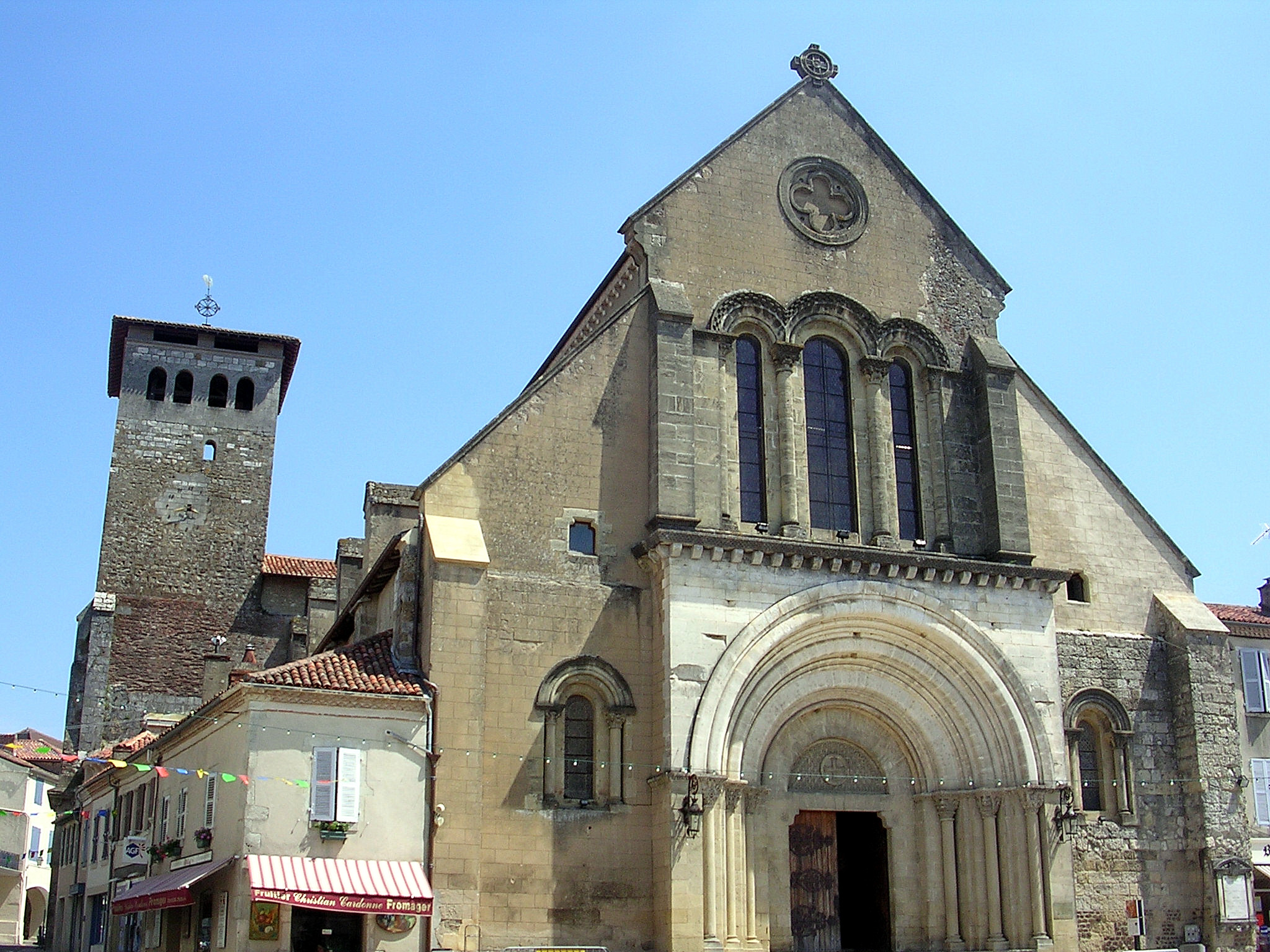
Saint-Sever Abbey

Saint-Sever Abbey (abbaye de Saint-Sever) is a Benedictine monastery in Saint-Sever, Landes, France. It was founded at the end of the 10th century by William II Sánchez of Gascony. It was listed by France as a historic monument on 18 November 1911 and in 1998 it and other sites were jointly designated as the Routes of Santiago de Compostela in France World Heritage Site.

== Bibliography ==
- Jean-Auguste Brutails, 1900: L'église abbatiale de Saint-Sever in Bulletin Archéologique
- Daniel Le Blévec (dir.) and Centre historique de recherches et d'études médiévales sur la Méditerranée occidentale (Éditeur scientifique): Les cartulaires méridionaux: actes du colloque organisé à Béziers les 20 et 21 septembre 2002. Paris, École des chartes, coll. "Études et rencontres de l'École des chartes" (no 19), 2006, 1 vol. (270 p.-VIII p. of pl.) ISBN 2900791804
- Georges Pon (Éditeur scientifique), Jean Cabanot (Éditeur scientifique) and Abbaye Saint-Sever (Éditeur scientifique), 2010: Chartes et documents hagiographiques de l'Abbaye de Saint-Sever: Landes: 988-1359. Dax, Comité d'études sur l'histoire et l'art de la Gascogne, 2010, 2 vols. ISBN 9782950158482
- Pierre Daniel Du Buisson, 1876: Historiæ monasterii S. Severi libri X: auctore D. Petro Daniele Du Buisson, Vicojulii ad Aturem, L. Dehez, 2 vols.
- Historiae monasterii S. Severi libri X, vols. 1 and 2
- Camille Tauzin, Petite histoire de Saint-Sever: cap de Gascogne: des origines au XVe siècle (previously published in the Bulletin de la Société de Borda, Dax, 1914–1916), Cressé, Éditions des Régionalismes, coll. "Arremoludas" (no 149C), 2014 ISBN 9782824003320
- André de Laborde-Lassale, En Chalosse: notes historiques (previously published by S. Serres, Saint-Sever-sur-Adour, 1907), Cressé, Éd. des Régionalismes-PyréMonde-Princi Negue, coll. "Arremoludas" (no 354), 2011 ISBN 2846187258
- André de Laborde-Lassale, Monographie. Une Famille de la Chalosse, 1723-1852, Saint-Sever-sur-Adour, Severin frères, 1902
- Jean Cabanot, Georges Pon, Une abbaye au cœur de la Gascogne, Saint-Sever (988-1791), Centre d'études sur l'histoire et l'art de la Gascogne (CEHAG), Dax, 2014 ISBN 9782950158499, 232p. (review by Laurence Cabrero-Ravel, in Bulletin monumental, 2016, no 174–4, p. 515–516, ISBN 9782901837657)
- Denis de Sainte-Marthe and Barthélemy Hauréau, Gallia christiana: in provincias ecclesiasticas distributa, qua series et historiæ archiepiscoporum, episcoporum et abbatum (reproduced in facsimile from the Paris edition, 1715–1865), Farnborough, England, Gregg, 1970, 16 vols. ISBN 0576785563
