= Jean Jaubert de Barrault =

French bishop

Orders
- Consecration: 7 August 1611 by François de La Rochefoucauld

Personal details
- Born: c. 1584 Blaignac
- Died: July 30, 1643 (aged 58–59) Bordeaux
- Denomination: Catholic

Bishop of Bazas
- In office 1611–1630
- Preceded by: Arnaud de Pontac
- Succeeded by: Nicolas de Grillié

Archbishop of Arles
- In office 20 July 1630 – 30 July 1643
- Preceded by: Gaspard du Laurens
- Succeeded by: François Adhémar de Monteil

Jean Jaubert de Barrault (1584 – 30 July 1643) was Bishop of Bazas, Bishop of Diocèse étranger, then archbishop of Arles.

== Early years ==
Jean Jaubert de Barrault was born in 1584 in Blaignac. He was the son of Aymeric Jaubert de Barrault and Guyonne de la Motte. He first studied in Bordeaux where he obtained a license in utroque jure in January 1598. He also studied at La Flèche around 1606–1609 and completed his knowledge of theology in Rome. He was tonsured on 9 June 1591 and was a sub-deacon until his promotion to the episcopate, and also commendatory abbot of Solignac Abbey in the diocese of Limoges, prior of Saint-Aubin in the diocese of Bazas and archdeacon of Bazas.

=== Prelate ===
Jaubert became Bishop of Bazas in the Archbishopric of Auch in February 1605. He was appointed bishop of a foreign diocese in 1611 and consecrated bishop on 7 August 1611 in Rome by Cardinal François de La Rochefoucauld, Bishop of Senlis. In 1630 he was transferred to Arles where on 20 July he acceded to the seat of archbishop of this city. He was confirmed on 12 May 1631.

Very closely linked to the Benedictines of the Congregation of Saint Maur, he introduced the Benedictine regime in the Arles monasteries of Saint-Jean and Montmajour. In Montmajour, he encountered opposition from the monks. In 1638, he had to appeal to letters patent from the king authorizing him if necessary to have recourse to the Intendant of Provence to impose the concordat of 1639. The Maurists took possession of this monastery at the feast of Saint Michael in 1639.

Jean Jaubert de Barrault fell sick and had to move away from Arles, first to Paris then to Bordeaux where he died on 30 July 1643. He was replaced at the archbishopric by his coadjutor, François Adhémar de Monteil.

== Sources ==
- Bergin, Joseph (1996), The Making of French Episcopate (1589-1661), Yale University Press, ISBN 978-0300067514
- catholic-hierarchy
