= Aymeric Jaubert de Barrault =

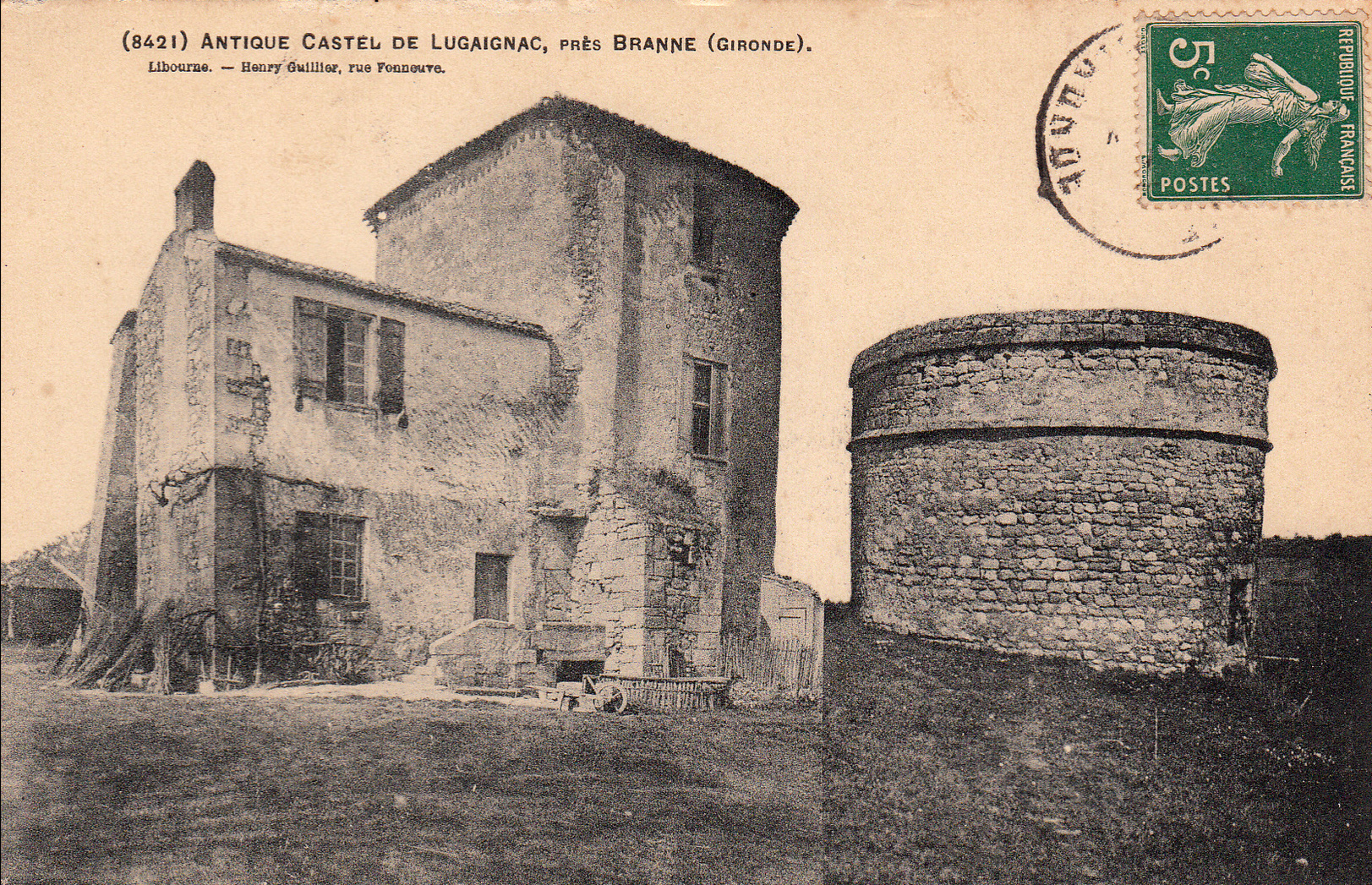
- Ruins of the Château de Lugaignac in 1912

Mayor of Bordeaux
- In office 17 July 1611 – 25 February 1613
- Preceded by: Antoine de Roquelaure
- Succeeded by: Antoine de Roquelaure

Personal details
- Died: 25 February 1613

Aymeric Jaubert de Barrault was a Gascon knight close to King Henry IV of France. He was mayor of Bordeaux from 17 July 1611 to his death on 25 February 1613.

== Biography ==
Since the Hundred Years' War, the Jaubert de Barrault family held the seigneuries of Lugaignac, on the left bank of the Dordogne, and of Blaignac near Branne.

Aymeric occupied the positionsof Seneschal of the Bazadais and Admiral of Guyenne. During the Franco-Savoyard War (1600–1601) he was with Henry IV in Lyon at the start of 1601 to negotiate a peace treaty with Charles Emmanuel I, Duke of Savoy.

By a letter to Cardinal de Sourdis, the regent Marie de' Medici had him appointed mayor of Bordeaux in 1611 to replace Antoine de Roquelaure, who had fallen out of favor for having opposed the appointment of the Henri, Prince of Condé, as governor of Guyenne. Roquelaure and Jaubert de Barrault cordially detested each other.

Aymeric married Guyonne de La Mothe with whom he had at least two sons: Antoine the elder, ambassador to Spain, and Jean, bishop of Bazas.

He fell ill and died on 25 February 1613 while travelling to Paris at the request of the king. His children demanded a funeral worthy of a mayor, but Parliament refused, claiming that his castle near Branne where the body was deposited was outside of city jurisdiction. The jurats did not attend the funeral, invoking a regulation which forbade them to leave Bordeaux.

== Sources ==
- Desforges, André, ed. (2008), Histoire des maires de Bordeaux (in French), Bordeaux: Les Dossiers d'Aquitaine, p. 523, ISBN 978-2-84622-171-9
- Drouyn, Leo (1877), "Essai Historique et Archéologique", Actes de l'Académie nationale des sciences, belles-lettres et arts de Bordeaux (in French), Hotel des sociétés savantes: Académie nationale des sciences, belles-lettres et arts de Bordeaux
- Guinodie, Raymond (1876), Histoire de Libourne et des autres villes et bourgs de son arrondissement, accompagnée de celle des monuments religieux, civils et militaires : de celle des ordres monastiques; de celle des ducs, comtes, marquis ... (in French), Chez l'auteur
