= Guillaume V Arnaud de La Mothe =

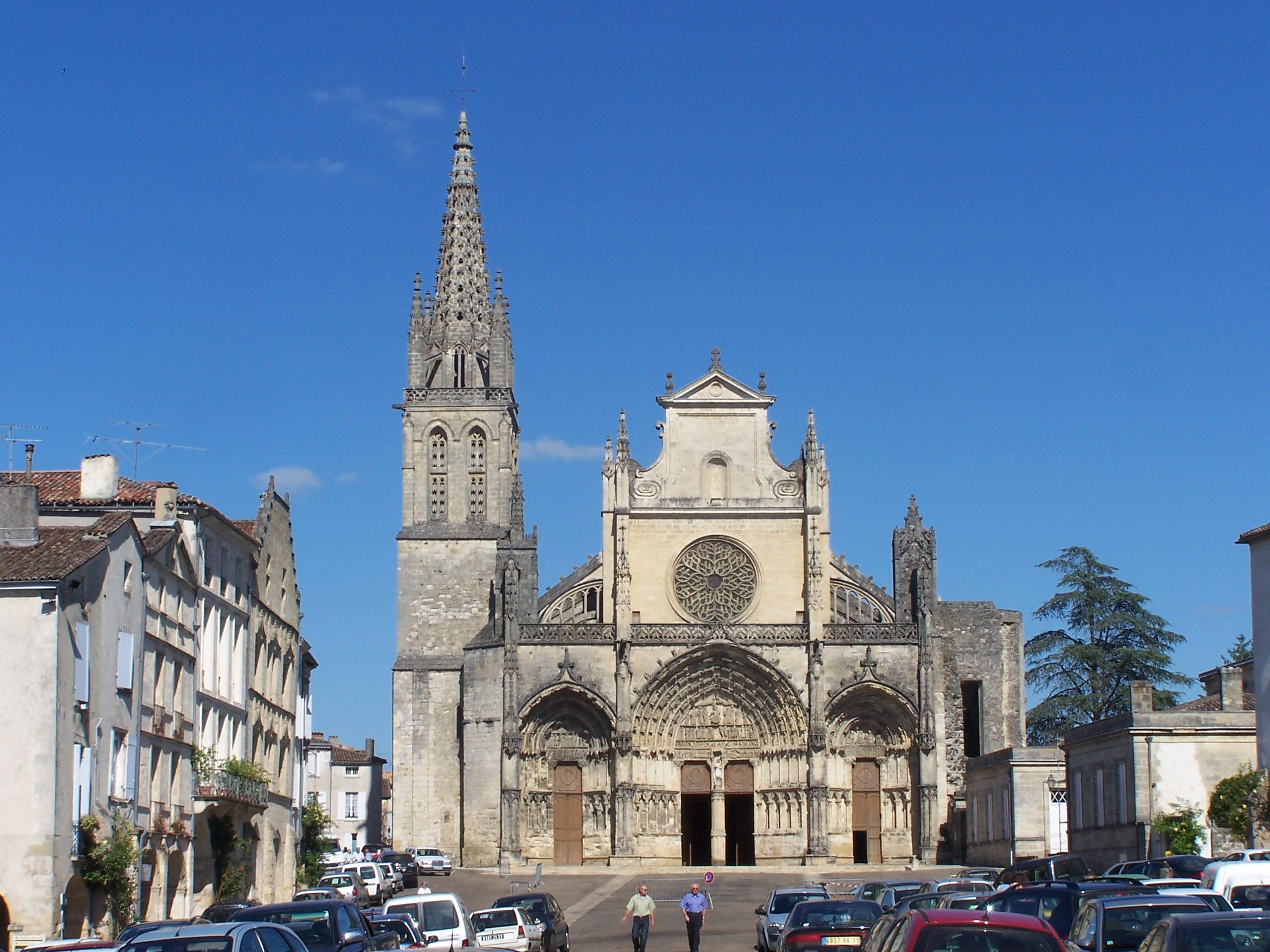
Bazas Cathedral

Guillaume V Arnaud de La Mothe was a fourteenth century Catholic Bishop of Bazas and Saint-Bertrand-de-Comminges, both in France.

He was Bishop of Bazas from 1302 until 1313, and again in 1319. In 1313 he was transferred by pope Clement V to Saintes, Charente-Maritime but he arranged to exchange see with his nephew Thibaut or Théobald de Castillon, his replacement at Bazas. He died at Saintes in 1313.
