= Diocese of Saint-Paul =

Diocese and Archdiocese of Saint-Paul may refer to the following Latin Catholic jurisdictions, with different sees:

- the present Roman Catholic Diocese of Saint Paul, Alberta, in Canada
- the present Archdiocese of Saint Paul and Minneapolis, in the USA
- the former Ancient Diocese of Saint-Paul-Trois-Châteaux, in feudal France
