= Baroville =

Commune in Grand Est, France

- Commune
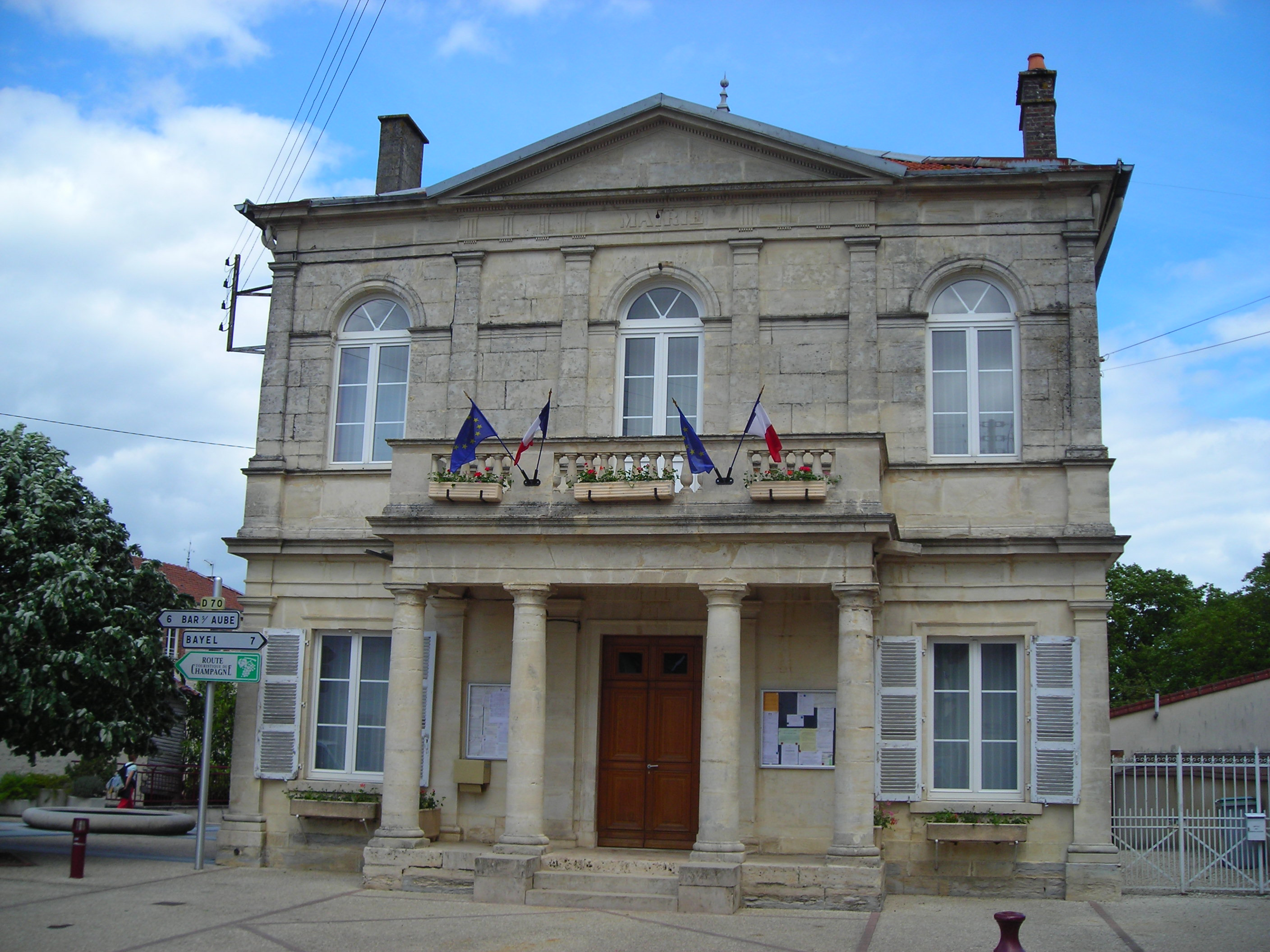
- The town hall in Baroville

- Coat of arms
- Location of Baroville
- Location within France Location within Grand Est
- Coordinates: 48°11′35″N 4°43′19″E
- Country: France
- Region: Grand Est
- Department: Aube
- Arrondissement: Bar-sur-Aube
- Canton: Bar-sur-Aube
- Intercommunality: Région de Bar sur Aube

Government
  - Mayor (2020–2026): Marie-Noëlle Rigollot
- Area^{1}: 17.32 km^{2} (6.69 sq mi)
- Elevation: 219 m (719 ft)
- Highest elevation: 260 m (850 ft)
- Lowest elevation: 200 m (660 ft)
- Population (2023): 252
  - Density: 14.5/km^{2} (37.7/sq mi)
- Time zone: UTC+01:00 (CET)
  - Summer (DST): UTC+02:00 (CEST)
- INSEE/Postal code: 10032 /10200
- ^{1} French Land Register data, which excludes lakes, ponds, glaciers > 1 km^{2} (0.386 sq mi or 247 acres) and river estuaries.

Baroville (French pronunciation: [baʁɔvil]) is a commune in the Aube department in the Grand Est region of north-central France.

== Geography ==
Baroville is located some 25 km west by north-west of Chaumont and 5 km south-east of Bar-sur-Aube. Access to the commune is by the D70 road from Saint-Usage in the south-west which passes through the commune and the village and continues north to join the D396 north of the commune. The D170 goes east from the village to join the D396 on the eastern border of the commune where the D396 goes south forming part of this border. The commune is farmland in the west centre and forested in the east with the edge of a large forest on the western side.

The river Aube passes close to the eastern border of the commune but does not touch the commune.

== Toponymy ==
The village is mentioned in 1095 under the name Basnoville or Barosvilla.

The names in all Merovingian and Carolingian areas that end in -ville are derived from the Low Latin villa meaning "farm" or "domain" preceded by a Germanic personal name is most often the case. This is the case for Baro according to and Ernest Nègre and Albert Dauzat.

The name is homonymous with Barville, Normandy. The person's name is also found in Baromesnil, a commune of Upper Normandy.

== History ==
Baroville appears as Baroville on the 1750 Cassini Map and the same on the 1790 version.

In 1789 Baroville came under the stewardship of the Généralité de Châlons, the Electoral district of Bar-sur-Aube, the bailiwick of Chaumont and the Chatellerie of Jaucourt. During the intermediate period in the French Revolution the commune was part of the canton of Couvignon until Year IX. It was part of the Diocese of Langres and the Deanery of Bar-sur-Aube.

=== Heraldry ===
Arms of Baroville	Blazon: Sable, a bend chequy Argent and Gules of 2 tiers; in chief Vert debruised by a crozier Or itself debruised by the bend, between in chief two bunches of grapes the same stalked and leaved Argent.

== Administration ==
List of Successive Mayors

From	To	Name
	1857	Boucard
2001	2026	Marie-Noëlle Rigollot

== Demography ==
The inhabitants of the commune are known as Barovillois or Barovilloises in French.

Historical population

Year	Pop.	±% p.a.
1793	439	—
1821	566	+0.91%
1846	640	+0.49%
1872	675	+0.20%
1901	497	−1.05%
1926	370	−1.17%
1946	316	−0.79%
1962	358	+0.78%
1968	367	+0.41%

Year	Pop.	±% p.a.
1975	333	−1.38%
1982	350	+0.71%
1990	333	−0.62%
1999	329	−0.13%
2007	347	+0.67%
2012	329	−1.06%
2017	306	−1.44%
2023	252	−3.18%

Source: EHESS and INSEE

== Economy ==
Viticulture is the main activity of the village. Baroville is one of 320 municipalities eligible for the Appellation d'origine contrôlée "Champagne". With its 217 hectares (Source: CIVC 2006) Baroville has the largest vineyards in the Bar-sur-Aube area and has over fifty vineyards. The vines are planted on a series of six valleys and include the traditional grape varieties (90% Pinot Noir, 2% Pinot Meunier and 8% Chardonnay).

== Culture and heritage ==
=== Civil heritage ===
The commune is the location of a fortified house in the valley of Morvaux which was the summer residence of the Abbots of Clairvaux in the 18th century. It was destroyed during the French Revolution.

=== Religious heritage ===
The Parish Church of Saint Stephen (18th century) has been rebuilt and has preserved the apse of the old church from the end of the 12th century. It contains a very large number of objects that are registered as historical objects.

== Notable people linked to the commune ==
- Edme Mongin (1668–1746), bishop of Bazas and member of the Académie française was born in Baroville.

== See also ==
- Communes of the Aube department
