= Diocese of St. Paul =

Diocese of St. Paul or Diocese of Saint Paul may refer to:

- Archdiocese of Saint Paul and Minneapolis
- Roman Catholic Diocese of Saint-Paul-Trois-Châteaux
- Roman Catholic Diocese of Saint Paul, Alberta
