= Edme Mongin =

French preacher and bishop of Bazas

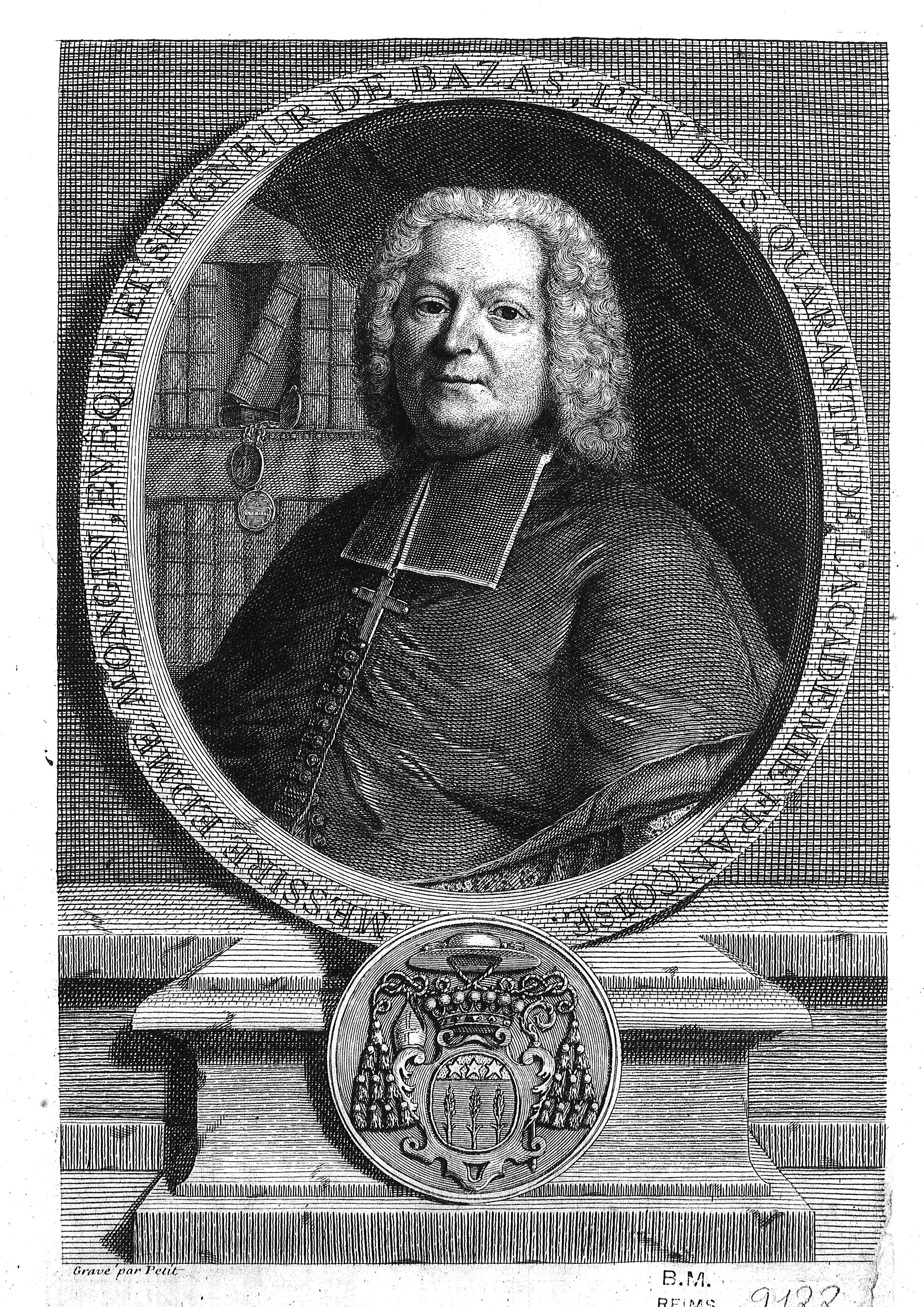
Edme Mongin, bishop of Bazas

Edme Mongin (January 1668 – 5 May 1746) was a French preacher and bishop of Bazas. He was born in Baroville and died, aged about 78, in Bazas. He was the son of Etienne Mongin and Anne Bailly.

Preceptor of the Duke of Bourbon and the Count of Charolais, he pronounced the funeral oration of Louis XIV in 1715 and the panegyric of Saint Vincent de Paul in 1737 on the occasion of his canonization.

He was appointed Bishop of Bazas in 1724, confirmed on 29 January 1725, and was consecrated in March by Henri de Nesmond, Archbishop of Toulouse. He was the commendatory abbot of St. Martin, Autun, from 1708.

His collected works were published in 1745.
