= Michel d'Arande =

Michel d'Arande, also spelled d'Aragnde or d'Arandia, was a French cleric. He was an Augustinian hermit, who became Marguerite de Navarre's court preacher, and bishop of Saint-Paul-Trois-Châteaux in 1526. The faculty of the University of Paris criticized his evangelical preaching, but he was defended by Marguerite and her mother Louise of Savoy.
