= Victor (bishop of Saint-Paul-Trois-Châteaux) =

Victor was a bishop of the former Roman Catholic Diocese of Saint-Paul-Trois-Châteaux in the 6th century.

== Salonius and Sagittarius ==
Salonius of Embrun and Sagittarius of Gap were two contemporary Frankish bishops. According to Gregory of Tours, these two bishops used violence to steal property from others. When Bishop Victor was celebrating his birthday, these two bishops sent armed men to attack and steal his property. The men came, wounded Victor's servants, cut his robes and carried off the dishes and other objects used by the bishop at dinner.

A synod was held in Lyons by king Guntram which condemned these two bishops. However, these both appealed to Pope John III in Rome, who restored them to their dioceses. Victor also forgave them, but he was suspended from communion for forgiving them secretly without the advice of his fellow bishops. However, Guntram later restored Victor to communion.

== Other ==
He also attended the 573 Synod of Paris and the later Synod of Mâcon.
