= François Adhémar de Monteil =

French priest

François Adhémar de Monteil de Grignan

Bishop of Saint-Paul-Trois-Châteaux
- In office 1630–1645
- Preceded by: Antoine de Cros
- Succeeded by: Jacques Adhémar de Monteil

Archbishop of Arles
- In office 1644–1689
- Preceded by: Jean Jaubert de Barrault
- Succeeded by: Jean-Baptiste Adhémar de Monteil de Grignan

Personal details
- Born: 27 August 1603 Grignan
- Died: 9 March 1689 (aged 85) Arles

François Adhémar de Monteil de Grignan (27 August 1603 – 9 March 1689) was a French priest who was in turn Bishop of Saint-Paul-Trois-Châteaux, then Archbishop of Arles. He was made commander of the Order of the Holy Spirit on 31 December 1661.

== Biography ==
=== Origins and family ===
François Adhémar de Monteil de Grignan was born in Grignan on 27 August 1603. He came from the house of Castellane Adhémar, itself descended from the women of the ancient line of Adhémar de Monteil. He was the second son of Louis François Adhémar de Monteil, Count of Grignan, and of Jeanne d'Ancezune, daughter of Louis Cadart d'Ancezune and Louise de Sassenage. His parents married on 4 June 1595. Their children were: (Note: It seems that the Annuaire de la noblesse de France has an omission in the descent of "the other" François Adhémar de Monteil, husband of Françoise de Sévigné, who had a first daughter in October 1670 before having a second son the following year. This husband is challenged by his mother-in-law in a letter of October 18, 1671 in which Madame de Sévigné castigates her son-in-law and warns him against another pregnancy: "Do you think that I gave her to you to kill her, to destroy her? his health, his beauty, his youth?)

1. Louis Gaucher,
2. François, archbishop of Arles, 1643–1689;
3. Jacques, bishop of Uzès, 1660–1694;
4. Philippe, captain of the guards, killed at the siege of Mardick in 1657.

=== Service to the Church ===
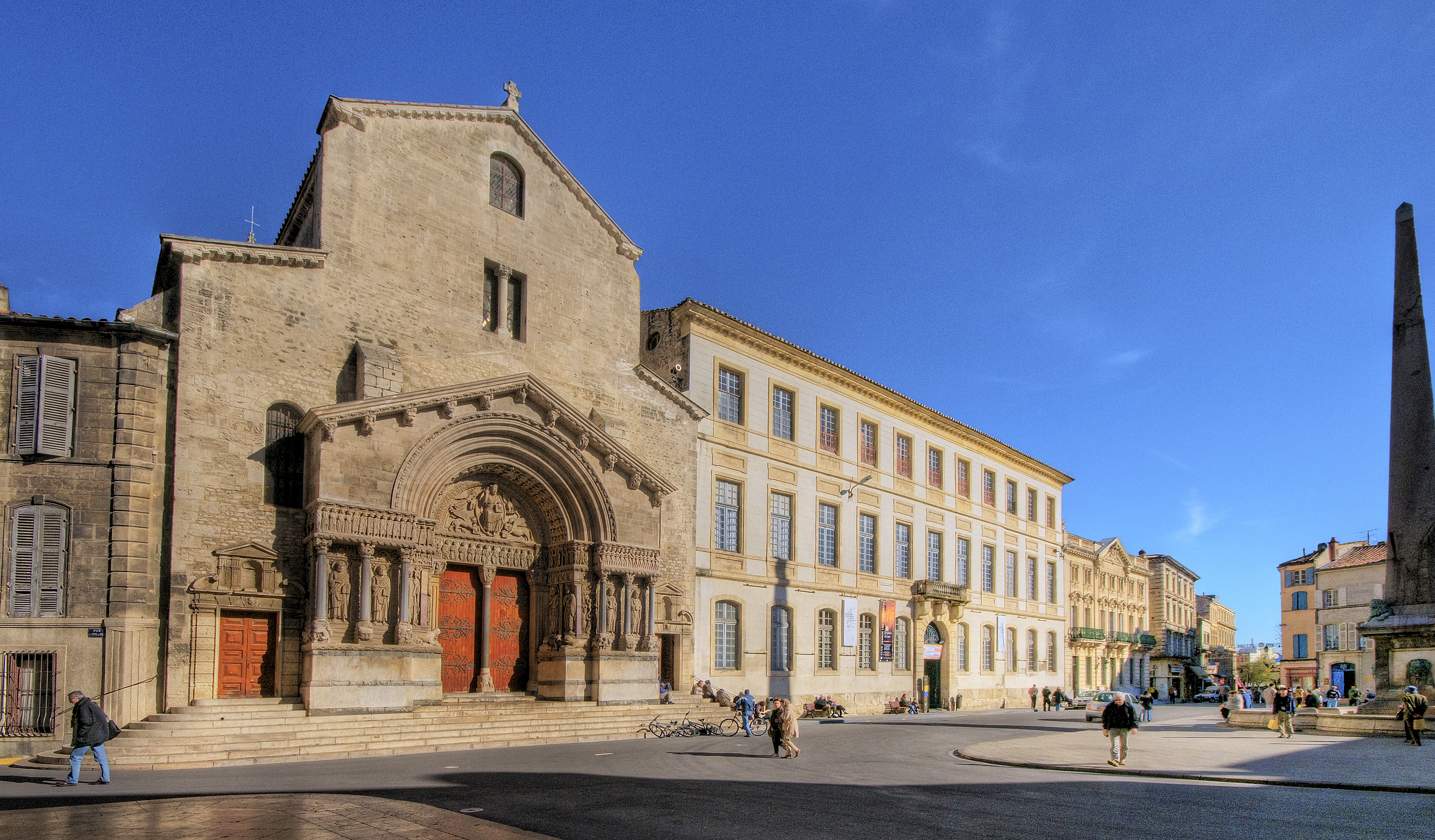
To the right of Saint-Trophime, the archbishop's palace - Arles

François became bishop of Saint-Paul-Trois-Châteaux on 12 May 1630 (confirmed on 16 December 1630, consecrated bishop on 14 September 1631), then archbishop of Arles on 31 March 1644 (confirmed on 16 January 1645). He made his pontifical entry into the city of Arles on 23 December 1646.

In 1652 a conflict broke out between the city's consuls and the archbishop, who demanded honors and rights due to his rank. François de Grignan wanted:

- To recover Trinquetaille, land and seigneury alienated by his predecessors,
- The rights of policing the calibration of weights,
- Some forced honors from consuls

This conflict, which lasted almost 10 years, ended with the transaction of 16 May 1661 put an end to the archbishop's claims, apart from a few rights of precedence which are granted to him.

François became blind in 1661 when he was received as Commander of the Holy Spirit. A lover of beautiful buildings, he had major repairs carried out at the archiepiscopal palace of Arles. His death occurred on 9 March 1689 after an episcopate of almost 45 years. He was buried in the Church of St. Trophime, Arles in the Saint-Genest chapel that he had built, which now also houses the remains of his nephew Jean-Baptiste, his coadjutor who became his successor.

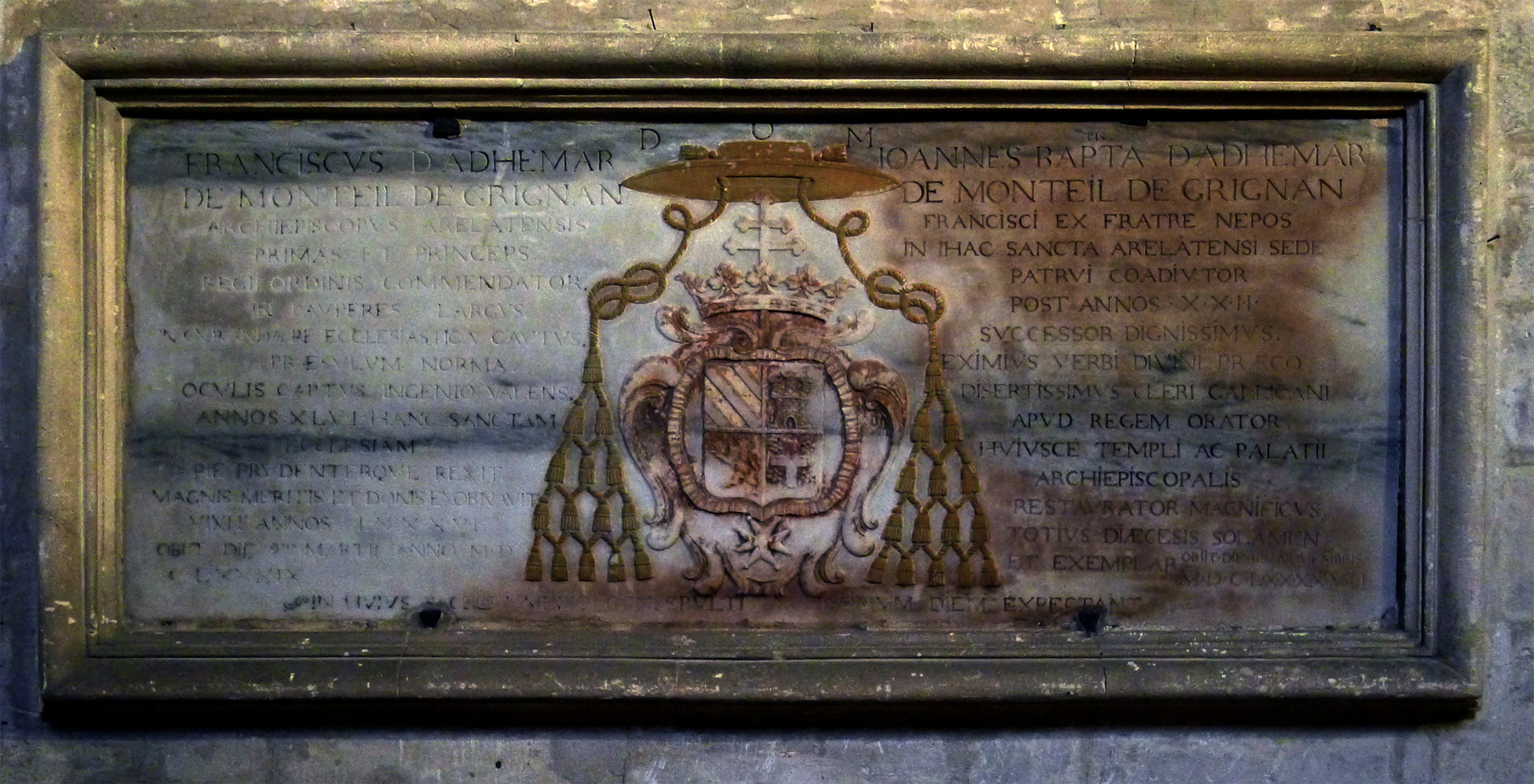
Plaque funéraire.

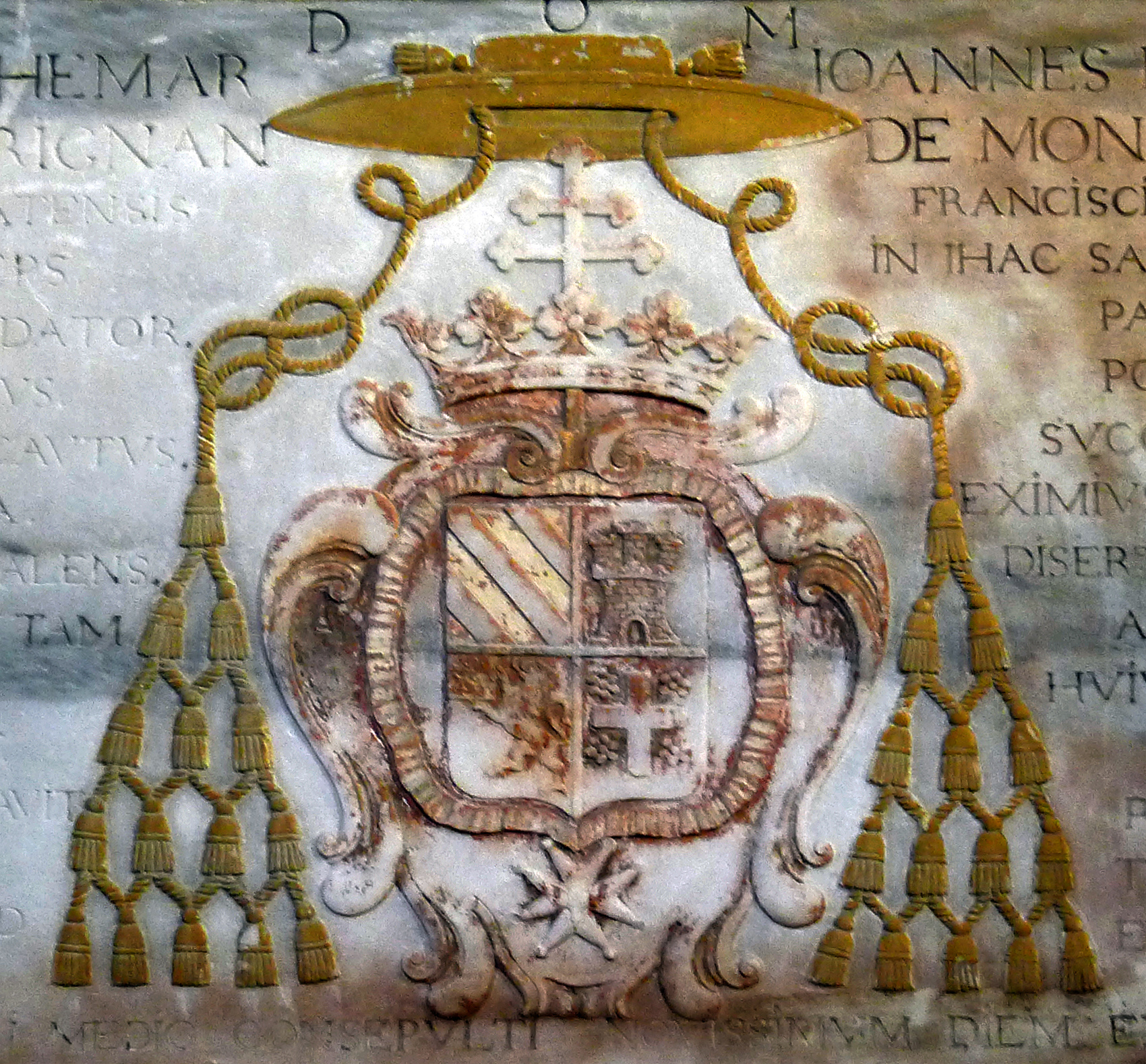
Armes de la famille.

François was the uncle of his successor, Jean-Baptiste Adhémar de Monteil de Grignan and brother of Jacques, Bishop of Uzès. He was also the paternal uncle of a lieutenant-general of Provence, François Adhémar de Monteil, Comte de Grignan, who married the daughter of Madame de Sévigné.

== Sources ==
- "Archbishop François Adhémar de Monteil de Grignan", Catholic-Hierarchy
- Borel d'Hauterive, André-François-Joseph; Révérend, Albert; Morant, Georges de; Angerville, Howard Horace (1859), "Grignan", Annuaire de la noblesse de France et des maisons souveraines de l'Europe (in French), Paris
- Bulletin des Amis du Vieil Arles
- Fassin, Émile (1889), Bulletin archéologique d'Arles (in French), vol. 1, Société Archéologique d'Arles
