= Saint-Paul-Trois-Châteaux Cathedral =

Former Roman Catholic cathedral in France

- Cathédrale Notre-Dame-et-Saint-Paul de Saint-Paul-Trois-Châteaux
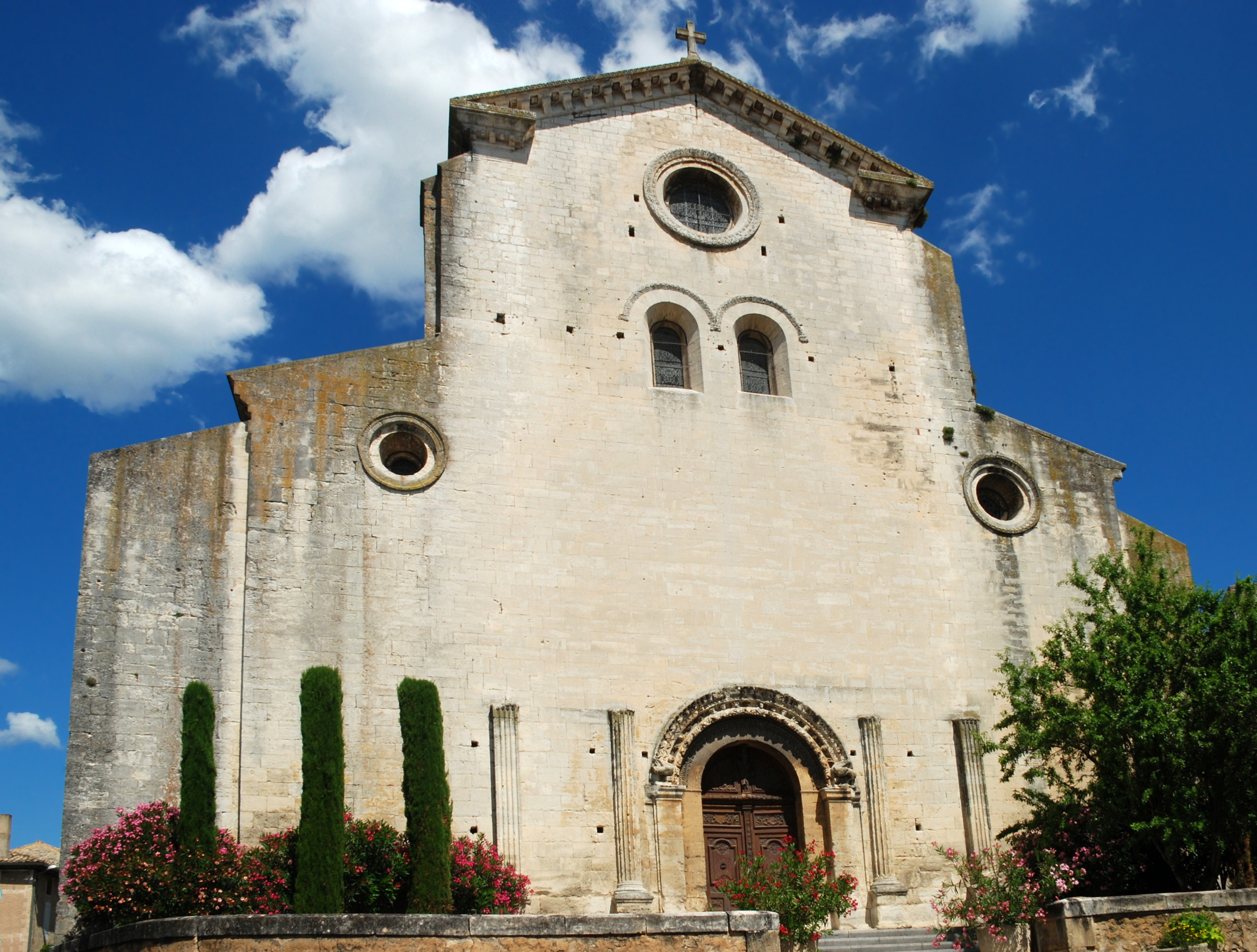
- Saint-Paul-Trois-Châteaux Cathedral
- Interactive map of the Saint-Paul-Trois-Châteaux Cathedral area

General information
- Status: Former cathedral; Monument historique
- Type: Church
- Architectural style: Provençal Romanesque
- Location: Saint-Paul-Trois-Châteaux, Drôme, France
- Coordinates: 44°20′58″N 4°46′3″E
- Opened: 12th–13th century

Technical details
- Material: Roman stone

Saint-Paul-Trois-Châteaux Cathedral (French: Cathédrale Notre-Dame-et-Saint-Paul de Saint-Paul-Trois-Châteaux or Cathédrale Notre-Dame de Saint-Paul-Trois-Châteaux) is a former Roman Catholic church located in the town of Saint-Paul-Trois-Châteaux, France. It was a national monument.

It was formerly the seat of the Bishop of Saint-Paul-Trois-Châteaux. The diocese (sometimes, like the town, also known as Saint-Paul-en-Tricastin) was created in either the 4th or the 6th century and was abolished under the Concordat of 1801, when its territory was divided between the Diocese of Avignon and the Diocese of Valence, known since 1911 as the Diocese of Valence (–Die–Saint-Paul-Trois-Châteaux).

== Building history ==
The present cathedral was built in the 12th-13th centuries and replaced an earlier one, of which some mosaics survive. It is in the Provençal Romanesque style, of which it is a particularly fine example, reusing Roman building materials.

== Sources ==
- Catholic Hierarchy: Diocese of Saint-Paul-Trois-Châteaux
- Notre-Dame-et-Saint-Paul Church at Structurae
- Art-Roman.net: Saint-Paul-Trois-Châteaux
