= Ancient Diocese of Bazas =

Roman Catholic diocese in France (? - c. 1790/1801)

Coordinates: 44.43°N 0.21°W

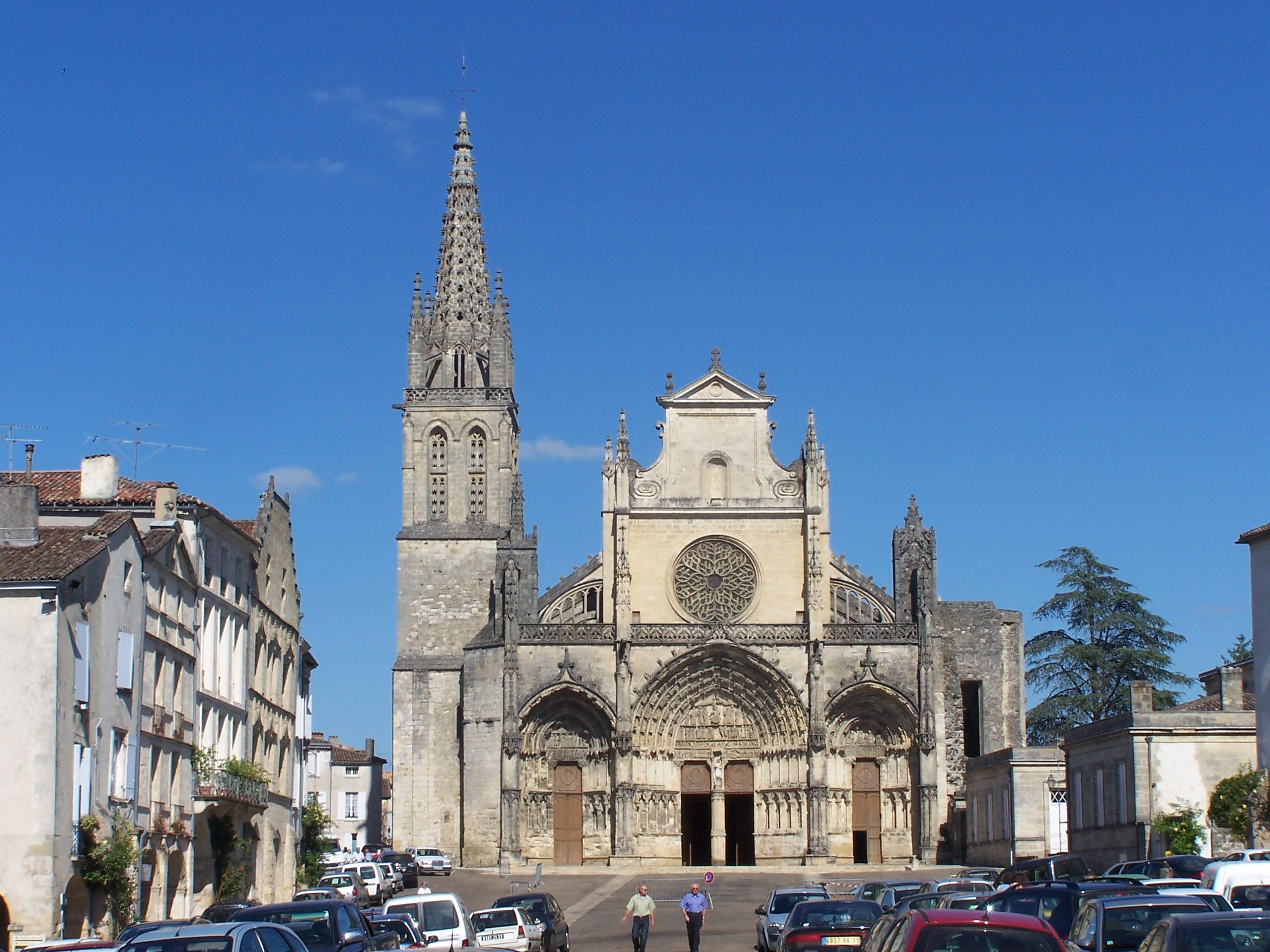
Bazas Cathedral

The Diocese of Bazas, centred on Bazas in Aquitaine, covered the Bazadais region, known under the Romans as the Vasatensis pagus after the ancient occupants, the Vasates. In the 2nd century it was part of the Novempopulania, one of the seventeen provinces of Gaul. The diocese must have been created between the first and the third centuries, but because of the large numbers of invaders that passed through this region - Arians, Saracens, Normans - the list of bishops is much reduced during the first millennium. The first bishop of this diocese is mentioned, without a name, by Gregory of Tours in his De gloria martyrum.

The diocese of Bazas, the seat of which was the cathedral of Saint-Jean-Baptiste de Bazas, was bordered on the north by the diocese of Périgueux, on the east by the diocese of Agen and the diocese of Condom, on the south by the diocese of Aire and the diocese of Dax, and on the west by the archdiocese of Bordeaux. It was divided into three archdeaconries.

It was suppressed during the French Revolution by the Legislative Assembly, under the Civil Constitution of the Clergy (1790). By the Concordat of 1801 its territory was unequally divided between the dioceses of Aire, Agen and Bordeaux. The title of the diocese of Bazas was preserved and assigned to the Archdiocese of Bordeaux-Bazas.

== Bishops of Bazas ==
=== to 1300 ===
- after 406: bishop, name unknown, mentioned by Gregory of Tours
- 506 and 511: Sextilius
- 585: Orestes
- 614: Gudualdus
- 673-675: Gundulfus

...

- 977-980: Gombaud, bishop of Gascony

c. 980-1000: Arsius Raca (Administrator during the minority of Hugo)

- 1000- c. 1012: Hugues

c. 1012- c. 1025 or 1029: Arsius Raca

- c. 1025- c. 1059: Raimond 'Vetulus' (the Elder)
- 1059-1084: Raimond the Younger
- 1084 - c. 1103: Étienne de Sentes
- 1104-1126: Bertrand de Baslade
- 1126 - c. 1134: Geoffroy or Godefroy
- 1134-1143 or 1144: Fortis Guarini de Pellegrue
- 1144-1146: Raimond
- 1146- c. 1165: Guillaume Arnaud de Tontoulon
- c. 1165-1186: Garsias de Benquet
- 1186-1213 or 1214: Gaillard de la Mothe
- 1214-1219: Guillaume II
- 1219-1242: Arnaud I de Pins
- 1242-1265: Raimond IV de Castillon
- 1265-1277: Guillaume III de Pins
- 1277-1294 or 1296: Hugues II de Rochefort
- 1294 ou 1296-1299: Guillaume IV Geoffroy
- 1299-1302: Arnaud Falquet, Fouquet, Foucaud or Foulques

=== since 1300 ===
- 1302-1313 and 1319: Guillaume V Arnaud de La Mothe
- 1313-1318: Theobald de Castillon (Thibault)
- 1318-1319: Guillaume de La Mothe (again)
- 1319–1325 Guillaume
- 1325-1334: Pictavin (Poitevin) de Montesquiou
- 1334-1348: Gaillard de Fargues or de la Trave or de Préchac
- 1348-1357: Raimond Arnaud de la Mothe
- 1358-1360: Géraud or Gérald du Puy or du Puch (de Podio)
- 1360: Pierre
- 1361-1368: Guillaume VII
- 1371-1374: Guillaume IX de Montlaur

==== Great Western Schism ====
- Allegiance to Avignon
- 1374-1394: Jean I de Caseton, O.Min.
- 1395-1397: Guillaume X d'Ortholan
- 1397-1417: Pierre II Saupin
- Allegiance to Rome
- 1393: Maurice Usk, O.P.
- 1396 - c. 1411 or 1412: Jean de Heremo, O.E.S.A.

==== Return to unity ====
- 1421- c. 1430: Bernard d'Yvon
- 1433-1446: Henri François de Cavier
- 1447-1450: Bernard Yvest de Roserge
- 1450-1457: Raimond de Tulle
- 1457-1485: Raimond du Treuil, O.Min.
- 1486-1504: Jean de Bonald
- 1504-1520: Cardinal Amanieu d'Albret (Administrator)
- 1521-1528: Symphorien Bullioud
- 1528-1531: Foucauld de Bonnevald
- 1531-1544: Jean IV de Plats or Plas
- 1544-1554: Annet de Plas
- 1555-1558 or 1561: Jean Baptiste Alamanni

1558-1559: Amanieu de Foix, died before taking possession of his bishopric.

- 1563-1564: Jean de Balaguier
- 1564-1572: François de Balaguier
- 1572-1605: Arnaud de Pontac
- 1605-1631: Jean Jaubert de Barrault de Blaignac
- 1631-1633: Nicolas de Grillié, Grillet or Grilles
- 1633-1645: Henri II Listolfi Maroni
- 1646-1667: Samuel Martineau de Turé
- 1668-1684: Guillaume de Boissonade d'Orty
- 1685-1724: Jacques-Joseph de Gourgue
- 1724-1746: Edme Mongin, occupied Seat 26 of the Académie Française (1707–1746)
- 1746-1792: Jean Baptiste II Amédée de Grégoire de Saint-Sauveur

== See also ==
- Catholic Church in France
- List of Catholic dioceses in France

== Bibliography ==
=== Reference works ===
- Gams, Pius Bonifatius (1873). Series episcoporum Ecclesiae catholicae: quotquot innotuerunt a beato Petro apostolo. Ratisbon: Typis et Sumptibus Georgii Josephi Manz. (Use with caution; obsolete)
- Eubel, Conradus, ed. (1913). Hierarchia catholica, Tomus 1 (second ed.). Münster: Libreria Regensbergiana. (in Latin)
- Eubel, Conradus, ed. (1914). Hierarchia catholica, Tomus 2 (second ed.). Münster: Libreria Regensbergiana. (in Latin)
- Gulik, Guilelmus (1923). Eubel, Conradus (ed.). Hierarchia catholica, Tomus 3 (second ed.). Münster: Libreria Regensbergiana.
- Gauchat, Patritius (Patrice) (1935). Hierarchia catholica IV (1592-1667). Münster: Libraria Regensbergiana.
- Ritzler, Remigius; Sefrin, Pirminus (1952). Hierarchia catholica medii et recentis aevi V (1667-1730). Patavii: Messagero di S. Antonio.
- Ritzler, Remigius; Sefrin, Pirminus (1958). Hierarchia catholica medii et recentis aevi VI (1730-1799). Patavii: Messagero di S. Antonio.

=== Studies ===
- Duchesne, Louis (1910). Fastes épiscopaux de l'ancienne Gaule: II. L'Aquitaine et les Lyonnaises. Paris: Fontemoing.
- Dupuy, Jérôme-Géraud (1747), Chronique de Bazas, in: Archives historiques du département de la Gironde Tome 15 (1874), pp. 1–67.
- Du Tems, Hugues (1774). Le clergé de France, ou tableau historique et chronologique des archevêques, évêques, abbés, abbesses et chefs des chapitres principaux du royaume, depuis la fondation des églises jusqu'à nos jours (in French). Vol. Tome premier. Paris: Delalain.
- Jean, Armand (1891). Les évêques et les archevêques de France depuis 1682 jusqu'à 1801 (in French). Paris: A. Picard.
- Sainte-Marthe, Denis de (1870). Paulus Piolin (ed.). Gallia christiana: in provincias ecclesiasticas distributa (in Latin). Vol. Tomus primus (editio altera ed.). Paris: Apud Victorem Palme. pp. 1189–1222, Instrumenta pp. 150–154.
