= Bazas Cathedral =

Cathedral located in Gironde, in France

Coordinates: 44°25′53″N 00°12′35″W

Bazas Cathedral Cathédrale Saint-Jean-Baptiste de Bazas
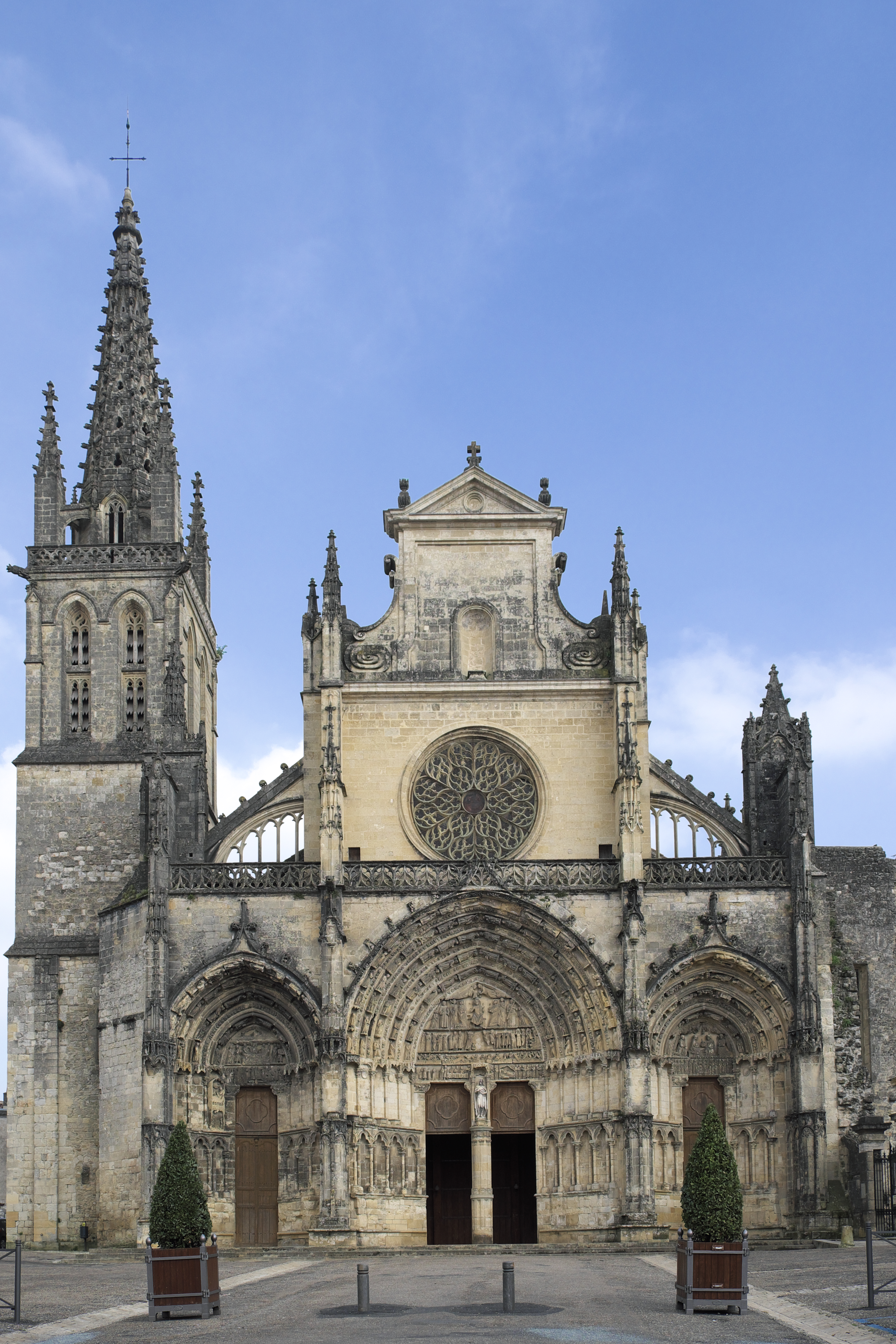
- Bazas Cathedral

Religion
- Affiliation: Roman Catholic Church
- Province: Bishop of Bazas
- Region: Gironde
- Rite: Roman
- Ecclesiastical or organisational status: cathedral
- Status: Active

Location
- Location: Bazas, France
- Interactive map of Bazas Cathedral; Cathédrale Saint-Jean-Baptiste de Bazas

Architecture
- Type: church
- Style: Gothic, Neoclassical
- Groundbreaking: 13th century
- Completed: 18th century

Bazas Cathedral (French: Cathédrale Saint-Jean-Baptiste de Bazas) is a Roman Catholic church located in Bazas, Gironde, France. The cathedral is a national monument.

Bazas was the seat of the Bishop of Bazas until the French Revolution (after which it was not restored but was instead, by the Concordat of 1801, divided between the dioceses of Bordeaux, Agen and Aire) and its main attraction is still the cathedral dedicated to Saint John the Baptist, so named because the blood of John the Baptist was venerated here. The cathedral dominates the town and stands at the east end of a wide, open space called the parvis.

The cathedral dates mainly from the 13th-14th centuries, and was built on the model of the great Gothic cathedrals of northern France. The west front is unique with its three noticeable levels: the first includes the three Gothic portals retaining part of their original 13th-century sculpture; the second includes the rose window from 1537; and the third is a Neoclassical gable from 1723. The belfry on the north is part 11th century up to the openings.

The interior consists of a long, narrow nave, with no transept, and was entirely rebuilt from 1583 to 1635 after the Huguenots badly damaged it in 1561 during the Wars of Religion.

The cathedral is part of the World Heritage Sites of the Routes of Santiago de Compostela in France.
