= Diocese of Saint-Paul-Trois-Châteaux =

Coordinates: 44.35°N 4.77°E

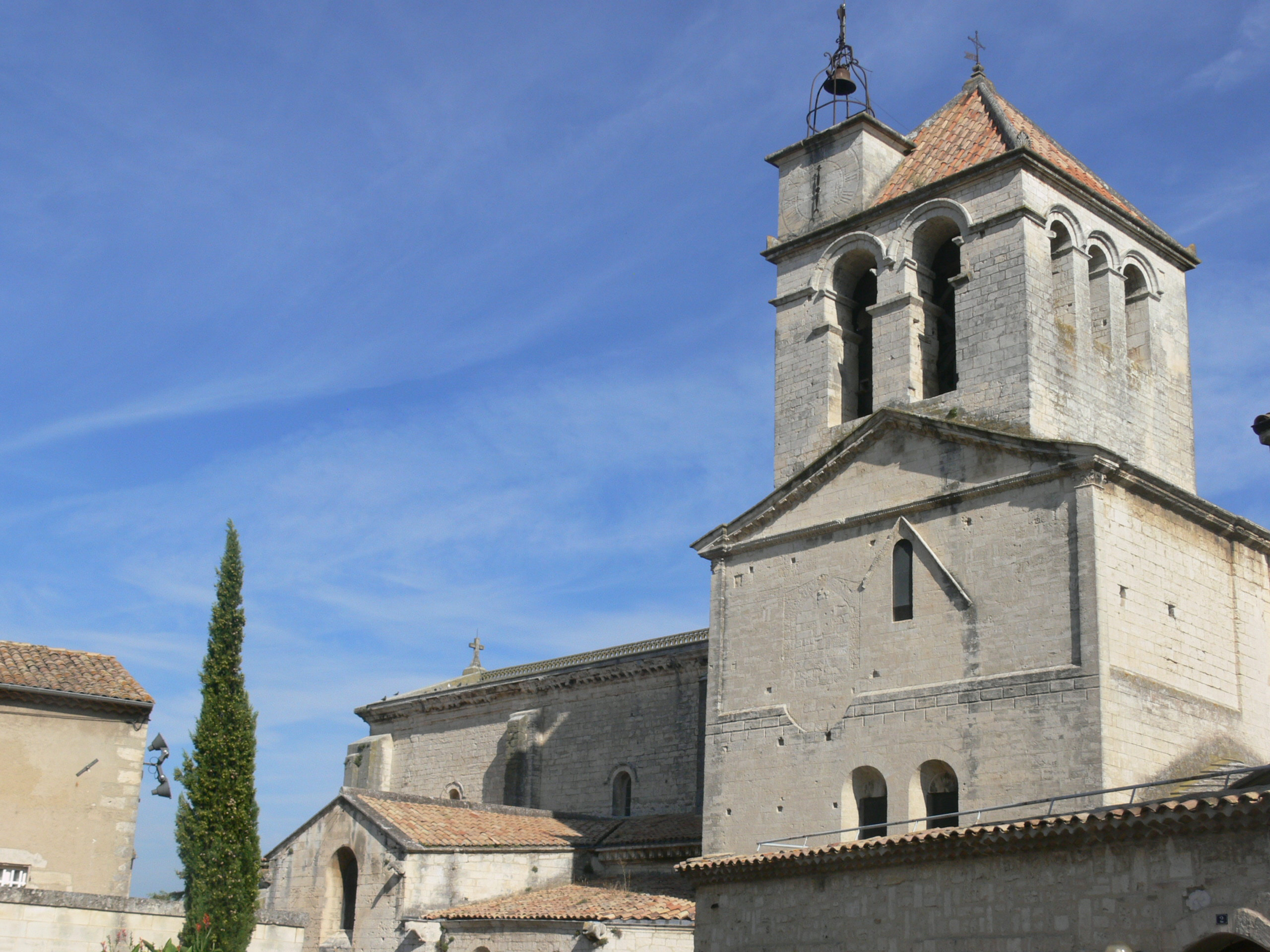
Saint-Paul-Trois-Châteaux Cathedral

The former French Roman Catholic Diocese of Saint-Paul-Trois-Châteaux (Latin: Dioecesis Sancti Pauli Tricastinorum; French: Diocèse de Saint-Paul-Trois-Châteaux), sometimes, just like the town, also known as the Diocese of Saint-Paul-en-Tricastin (Latin: Dioecesis Sancti Pauli Tricastinorum; French: Diocèse de Saint-Paul-en-Tricastin), existed from the sixth century to the French Revolution.

Its see was at Saint-Paul-Trois-Châteaux, in the modern department of Drôme, southern France. Its territory was included in the expanded Diocese of Valence, by the Napoleonic Concordat of 1801.

== History ==
The ancient Roman colony, Augusta Tricastinorum, became a bishopric in the Roman province of Gallia Viennensis by the 4th century. It first historically recorded bishop seems to be Florentius, who was a participant in the Council of Epaone (Kingdom of the Burgundians) in 517.

According to a legend of the fifteenth century, St. Restitutus, the man born blind mentioned in the Gospel, was the first Bishop of St-Paul-Trois-Châteaux. Local traditions also make Saints Eusebius, Torquatus, Paulus, Amantius, Sulpicius, Bonifatius, Castorinus and Michael early bishops of St-Paul-Trois-Châteaux, in the 3rd to 6th centuries. Of those, Louis Duchesne regards St. Paulus (fourth or sixth century), patron saint of the city, as the earliest attested bishop, after whom the diocese was later named. The "three chateaux" never existed; they are the result of a linguistic error in which an extra "r" was added to the word "tricastinorum".

The Diocese of St-Paul-Trois-Châteaux was always dependent on the archdiocese of Arles. Among its bishops were Heraclius (525–42), correspondent of Avitus of Vienne; Martin des Ormeaux (seventh century), who became a solitary.

=== Saint-Paul-Trois-Châteaux and Orange ===
Owing to Saracen ravages from Iberia (827-29) the see of St-Paul-Trois-Châteaux was, by a decree of Gregory IV, united aeque principaliter (i.e. in personal union) with that of Orange. By the 11th century, there were continuous squabbles between St-Paul-Trois-Châteaux and Orange, the former because of the union, the latter because of the assignment of parish churches. In spring 1095, as he was travelling to France, Pope Urban II wrote a letter from Cremona on 15 April to Bishop Pontius of Saint-Paul-Trois-Châteaux, advising him that he had decided to reunify the two dioceses as one, and that no successor of Bishop Guillaume of Orange and Saint-Paul would be elected. Pope Urban personally visited Saint-Paul-Trois-Châteaux in mid-September, and both Bishop Pons and Bishop Guillaume were present at the council of Clermont from 18 to 28 November 1095.

Bishop Guillaume of Orange went on crusade, and died in the siege of Marra on 11 December 1098. In 1100, Pope Paschal II announced that, after extensive consultations, the longstanding union of the two dioceses should be dissolved. In 1107, however, the clergy of Orange approached Pope Paschal with the claim that problems had been resolved; the pope authorized Cardinal Richard, Bishop of Albano, to hold a council of the ecclesiastical province of Arles. to decide the question, and if they agreed, to elect a new bishop of Orange. The Diocese of Orange was re-established, and Berengarius was elected. On the death of Bishop Pontius of St-Paul-Trois-Châteaux in 1112, squabbling broke out again, which Paschal II silenced with a bull on 18 October 1113.

Pope Gelasius II visited St-Paul-Trois-Châteaux on 21 December 1118 during his exile from Rome. He was on his way to Cluny, where he died on 29 January 1119.

=== Suppression of episcopal election ===
Bishop Guillaume Adhémar de Monteil (1482–1516) died on 23 July 1516, and the Chapter of the cathedral duly met to elect a successor. They chose Jacques de Vesc, and applied to the metropolitan, Archbishop Jean Ferrier of Arles, for canonical confirmation. King Francis I of France, however, had written to Pope Leo X, nominating Antoine de Lévis. In reply, on 10 September 1516, Pope Leo issued the bull "Decet Romanum pontificem," in which he voided the election of Jacques de Vesc, on the grounds that the papacy had previously reserved to itself the appointment of the next bishop. He "provided" (appointed) Antoine de Lévis, who, in turn, since he remained in Paris with the king, appointed the Bishop of Viviers, Claude de Tournon, a relative of his mother, his grand vicar in Saint-Paul-Trois-Châteaux.

=== Protestants ===
In 1674, the population of the city of Saint-Paul-Trois-Châteaux was only approximately 2,000 persons, about half of whom were Protestants. When the Edict of Fontainebleau, revoking the toleration of the Edict of Nantes, was published in October 1685, Saint-Paul-Trois-Châteaux was invested by royal troops and Protestant pastors were forced to leave the country. Individual Protestants and their families were hunted down. The Protestant church in Saint-Paul-Trois-Châteaux was ordered destroyed by the Parliament of Grenoble.

=== Changes and suppression ===
One of the first acts of the French Revolution was the abolition of feudalism and its institutions, including estates, provinces, duchies, baillies, and other obsolete organs of government. The National Constituent Assembly ordered their replacement by political subdivisions called "departments", to be characterized by a single administrative city in the center of a compact area. The decree was passed on 22 December 1789, the boundaries fixed on 26 February 1790, with the institution to be effective on 4 March 1790. Saint-Paul-Trois-Châteaux was assigned to the Departement de Drôme, with its administrative center at Valence. The National Constituent Assembly then, on 6 February 1790, instructed its ecclesiastical committee to prepare a plan for the reorganization of the clergy. At the end of May, its work was presented as a draft Civil Constitution of the Clergy, which, after vigorous debate, was approved on 12 July 1790. There was to be one diocese in each department, requiring the suppression of approximately fifty dioceses. Saint-Paul-Trois-Châteaux was an obvious target, given its small size and limited resources; its suppression was facilitated by the coincidental death of Bishop Pierre-François-Xavier de Reboul de Lambert, on 13 March 1791, before the required oaths of allegiance to the Civil Constitution by the clergy could be imposed. The suppression of dioceses by the state was uncanonical, and thus the Church considered the diocese without a bishop (sede vacante) from 1791 to 1801.

In the Civil Constitution of the Clergy, the National Constituent Assembly also abolished cathedral chapters, canonicates, prebends, chapters and dignities of collegiate churches, chapters of both secular and regular clergy of both sexes, and abbeys and priories whether existing under a Rule or in commendam.

On 1 March 1794, the name of the city was changed to Paul-lès-Fontaines.

On 29 November 1801, in the concordat of 1801 between the French Consulate, headed by First Consul Napoleon Bonaparte, and Pope Pius VII, the bishopric of Saint-Paul-Trois-Châteaux and all the other dioceses in France were suppressed. This removed all the contaminations and novelties introduced by the Constitutional Church. The pope then recreated the French ecclesiastical order, respecting in most ways the changes introduced during the Revolution, including the reduction in the number of archdioceses and dioceses. In 1801, when the archdiocese of Vienne was suppressed, the archdiocese of Lyon became the metropolitan of the diocese of Valence. The diocese of Saint-Paul-trois-châteaux (Tricastrensis), which had been a suffragan of the archdiocese of Arles, which was also suppressed on 29 November 1801, was not restored, and its territory was incorporated into the diocese of Valence.

On 12 June 1911, the title of the diocese of Saint-Paul-Trois-Châteaux was revived, though not the diocese itself. The title was assigned to the Diocese of Valence. Its former cathedral, Ancienne cathédrale Notre-Dame et Saint-Paul, dedicated to Saint Paul and the Assumption of the Virgin Mary, was not granted co-cathedral status. The diocese of Valence, however, does not use the title Saint-Paul-Trois-Châteaux, calling itself "Eglise Catholique dans la Drôme: Diocese de Valence."

== Bishops of Saint-Paul ==
=== To 1200 ===
...

- Paulus (attested 374)

...

- Florentius (attested 517–523)
- Heraclius 527–541
- Victor (attested 570–583)
- Eusebius (attested 584–585)
- Agricola (attested 614)
- Betto (attested c. 647–653)

...

- Bonifatius (II) (ca. 839)

...

- Laudonus (attested 839?)
- Pons (attested 850–852)

...

- Udalric (1013–1058)
- Geraldus D'Asteri (attested 1060–1085)
- Pons de Port (1095–1112)
- Aimar Adhémar (1112?–1119)
- Pons de Grillon (1134–1136)
- Géraud II. (1138–1147)
- Guillaume Hugues, (? – death 1179)
- Bertrand de Pierrelatte (1179–1206)

=== 1200 to 1600 ===
- Gaucerand (1206–1211)
- Geoffroy de Vogüé (1211–1233)
- Laurent (1233–1251)
- Bertrand de Clansayes (1251–1286)
- Benoit (1288–1292)
- Guillaume d'Aubenas (1293–1309)
- Dragonet de Montauban (1310–1328)
- Hugues Aimery (1328–1348)
- Guillaume Guitard (1348–1349)
- Jean Coci, O.E.S.A. (1349–1364)
- Jacques Artaud (1364–1367)
- Raimond Geoffroy de Castellane (1367–1378)
- Adhémar de La Roche, O.P. (1378–1385) Avignon Obedience

Jean de Murol (1385.07.12 – 1388.12.23) Apostolic Administrator Avignon Obedience

- Dieudonné D'Estaing (1388–1411) Avignon Obedience
- Hugues de Theissiac (1411–1448) Administrator

Pons de Sade (1444–1445) Administrator
Romanet Velheu (1445–1449) Administrator

- John of Segovia (born Spain) (1449–1450)
- Étienne Genevès (1450–1473)

Ysembert de Laye (1473–1478) Apostolic Administrator

- Astorge Aimery (1478–1480)
- Jean de Sirac 1480–1482
- Guillaume Adhémar de Monteil 1482–1516

[Jacques de Vesc 1516 (Bishop-elect)]

- Antoine de Lévis de Château-Morand (1516–1526), Bishop-elect, Apostolic Administrator
- Michel d'Arande (1526–1539)
- Jean de Joly (1539–1579)
- Thomas Pobel (1579–1582)
- Jean-Baptiste Legras (1583–1583)
- Antoine Gaume (1585–1598)

=== 1600 to 1801 ===
- Antoine de Cros (1600–1630)
- François Adhémar de Monteil de Grignan (1630–1645)
- Jacques Adhémar de Monteil de Grignan (1645–1657)
- Claude Ruffier (1658–1674)
- Luc d'Acquin (1674–1680)
- Louis-Aube de Roquemartine (1682–1713)
- Joseph-Maurel du Chaffaut (1714–1717)
- Claude de Simiane de Gordes (1718–1743)
- Pierre-François-Xavier de Reboul de Lambert (1743–1791)
  - Jean Marie du Lau, Apostolic Administrator (1791–1791)

Pierre Genès Tavernier (1800–1801) Administrator

== See also ==
- Roman Catholic Diocese of Valence
- List of Catholic dioceses in France
- Catholic Church in France

== Sources ==
- Gams, Pius Bonifatius (1873). Series episcoporum Ecclesiae catholicae: quotquot innotuerunt a beato Petro apostolo. Regensburg: Typis et Sumptibus Georgii Josephi Manz. pp. 619–620. (with the supplement) (Use with caution; obsolete)
- Eubel, Conradus, ed. (1913). Hierarchia catholica (in Latin). Vol. 1 (second ed.). Münster: Libreria Regensbergiana. p. 301.
- Eubel, Conradus, ed. (1914). Hierarchia catholica (in Latin). Vol. 2 (second ed.). Münster: Libreria Regensbergiana. p. 175.
- Eubel, Conradus, ed. (1923). Hierarchia catholica (in Latin). Vol. 3 (second ed.). Münster: Libreria Regensbergiana.
- Gauchat, Patritius (Patrice) (1935). Hierarchia catholica (in Latin). Vol. IV (1592–1667). Münster: Libraria Regensbergiana. p. 219.
- Ritzler, Remigius; Sefrin, Pirminus (1952). Hierarchia catholica medii et recentis aevi (in Latin). Vol. V (1667–1730). Patavii: Messagero di S. Antonio.
- Ritzler, Remigius; Sefrin, Pirminus (1958). Hierarchia catholica medii et recentis aevi (in Latin). Vol. VI (1730–1799). Patavii: Messagero di S. Antonio.
- Jean, Armand (1891). Les évêques et les archevêques de France depuis 1682 jusqu'à 1801 (in French). Paris: A. Picard.
- Pisani, Paul (1907). Répertoire biographique de l'épiscopat constitutionnel (1791–1802) (in French). Paris: A. Picard et fils.

=== Bibliography ===
- Albanès, Joseph Hyacinthe (1885). "Les évêques de Saint-Paul-Trois-Châteaux, au quatorzième siècle," (in French), in: Bulletin d'histoire ecclésiastique et d'archéologie religieuse des diocéses de Valence, Digne, Gap, Grenoble et Viviers, Vol. 5 (1885), pp. 383–408. Vol. 6 (1885), pp. 5–34.
- Albanès, Joseph Hyacinthe (1904). Gallia christiana novissima. (in Latin). Volume 4. Valence: Imp. Valentinoise, 1904.
- Bergin, Joseph. The Making of the French Episcopate, 1589–1661. New Haven: Yale University Press 1996.
- Boyer de Sainte-Marthe, Louis-Anselme (1710). Histoire de l'Eglise cathédrale de Saint-Paul-Trois-Châteaux avec une chronologie de tous les Evêques qui l'ont gouvernée. (in French). Avignon 1710
- Duchesne, Louis (1907). Fastes épiscopaux de l'ancienne Gaule: I. Provinces du Sud-Est (in French) (second ed.). Paris: Fontemoing..
- Sainte-Marthe, Denis de (1715). Gallia christiana. (in Latin). vol. I, Paris 1715, coll. 703–740.
- Pope Pius VII (1801). Qui Christi Domini, in Bullarii romani continuatio, Vol. XI, Rome 1845, pp. 245–249.

=== External links ===
- Chow, Gabriel. GCatholic, GCatholic with Google satellite photo – former bishopric. GCatholic, with Google satellite photo/map – former cathedral
- Goyau, Georges (1912). "Valence, Diocese of (Valentinensis)," in: The Catholic Encyclopedia Volume XV. New York: Robert Appleton 1912, pp. 250–251. (archived at: information at Catholic.org)
