= Bazas =

- Commune
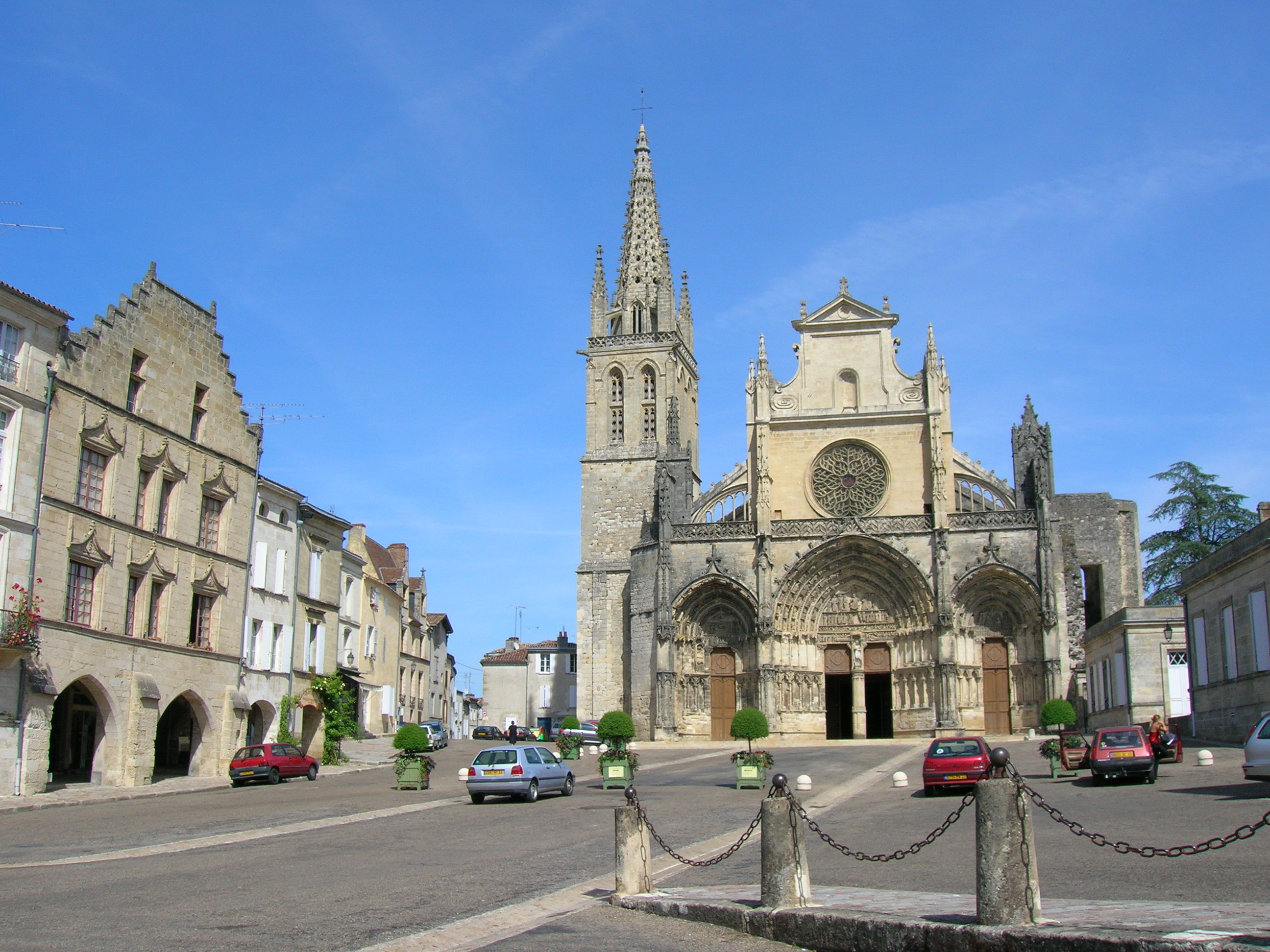
- Bazas Cathedral

- Coat of arms
- Location of Bazas
- Location within France Location within Nouvelle-Aquitaine
- Coordinates: 44°25′58″N 0°12′38″W
- Country: France
- Region: Nouvelle-Aquitaine
- Department: Gironde
- Arrondissement: Langon
- Canton: Le Sud-Gironde
- Intercommunality: Bazadais

Government
  - Mayor (2020–2026): Isabelle Dexpert
- Area^{1}: 37.29 km^{2} (14.40 sq mi)
- Elevation: 56 m (184 ft)
- Highest elevation: 123 m (404 ft)
- Lowest elevation: 34 m (112 ft)
- Population (2023): 4,854
  - Density: 130.2/km^{2} (337.1/sq mi)
- Time zone: UTC+01:00 (CET)
  - Summer (DST): UTC+02:00 (CEST)
- INSEE/Postal code: 33036 /33430
- ^{1} French Land Register data, which excludes lakes, ponds, glaciers > 1 km^{2} (0.386 sq mi or 247 acres) and river estuaries.

Bazas (French pronunciation: [bazas]; Gascon: Vasats) is a commune in Gironde, a department in southwestern France.

== Geography ==
Bazas stands on a narrow promontory above the Beuve valley 60 km/37 mi southeast of Bordeaux and 40 km/25 mi southwest of Marmande.

== History ==
City gate of Bazas as painted in the 19th century

As Cossio, it was capital of the ancient tribe of the Vasates, and under the Romans one of the twelve cities of Novempopulania, when it was known as Civitas Vasatica

In later times it was capital of the district of Bazadais, and was the seat of the bishop of the diocese of Bazas from at least the beginning of the 6th century until 1790. And for 250 years prior to 1057, the Bishop of Bazas bore the title of Bishop of Aire, Dax, Bayonne, Oloron and Lescar. According to Gregory of Tours, Bazas had a bishop at the time of the Vandal invasion in the 5th century.

The dedication of the cathedral to St. John the Baptist is explained in an account given by the same historian that a lady of Bazas, whom certain hagiographers of the 19th century believe to have been St. Veronica, brought from Palestine a relic of St. John the Baptist at the time of that saint's death.

Pope Urban II (1088–99) preached the crusade at Bazas.

Bazas was a subprefecture until 1926, when it was replaced in the role to Langon.

== Population ==
Historical population
| Year | Pop. | ±% p.a. |
|---|---|---|
| 1968 | 4,567 | — |
| 1975 | 4,748 | +0.56% |
| 1982 | 4,704 | −0.13% |
| 1990 | 4,379 | −0.89% |
| 1999 | 4,357 | −0.06% |
| 2007 | 4,596 | +0.67% |
| 2012 | 4,720 | +0.53% |
| 2017 | 4,772 | +0.22% |
| 2023 | 4,854 | +0.28% |
Source: INSEE

== Sights ==
The town has a Gothic cathedral dating from the 13th to the 16th centuries, part of the UNESCO World Heritage Sites of the Routes of Santiago de Compostela in France. There are remains of ramparts (15th and 16th centuries) and several old houses of the 16th century.

== See also ==
Ancient Diocese of Bazas

- Communes of the Gironde department
