= Blaignac =

- Commune
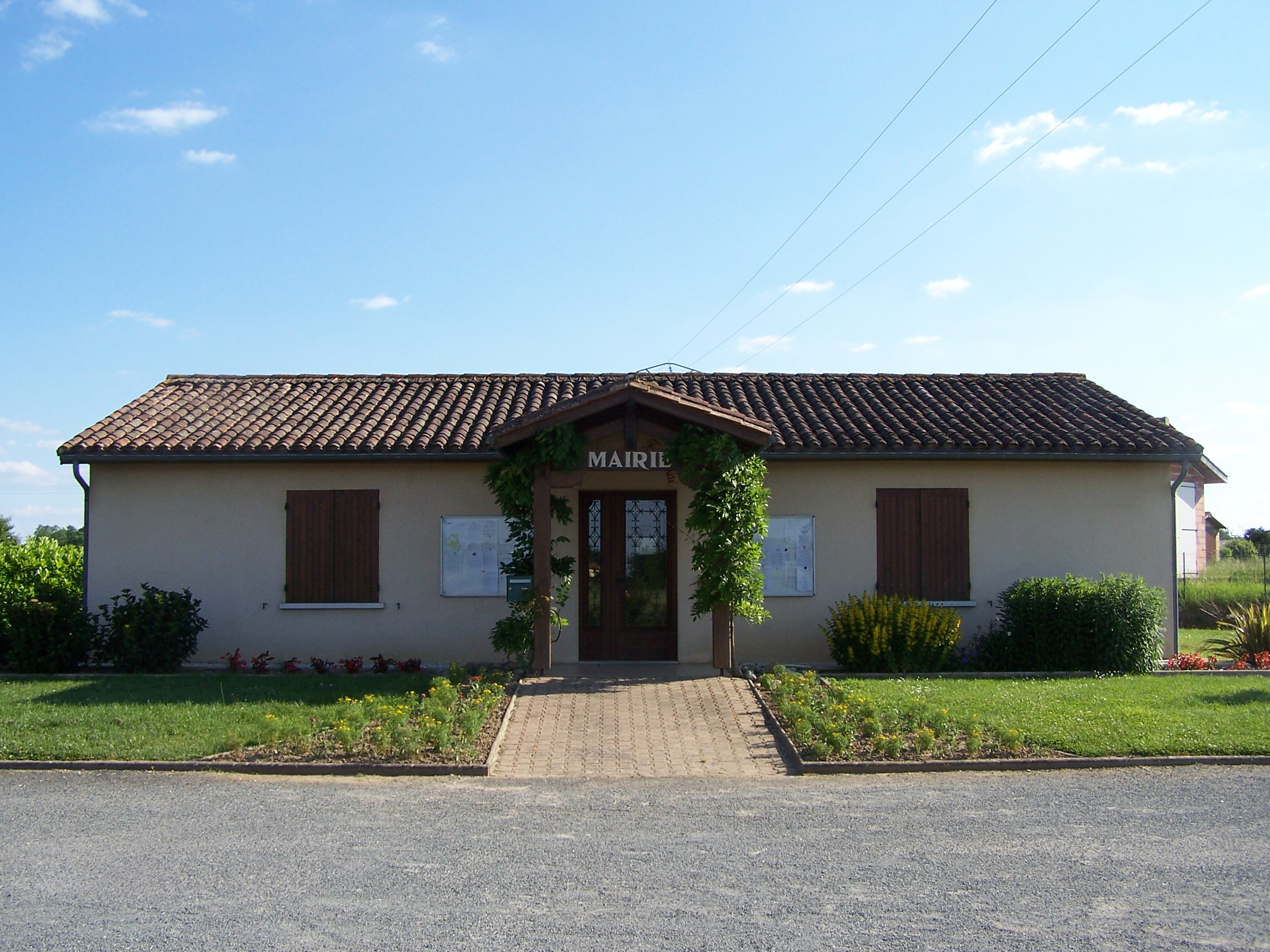
- Town hall
- Location of Blaignac
- Location within France Location within Nouvelle-Aquitaine
- Coordinates: 44°33′10″N 0°03′20″W
- Country: France
- Region: Nouvelle-Aquitaine
- Department: Gironde
- Arrondissement: Langon
- Canton: Le Réolais et Les Bastides
- Intercommunality: Réolais en Sud Gironde

Government
  - Mayor (2020–2026): Bernard Vincente
- Area^{1}: 3.18 km^{2} (1.23 sq mi)
- Elevation: 50 m (160 ft)
- Highest elevation: 63 m (207 ft)
- Lowest elevation: 12 m (39 ft)
- Population (2023): 335
  - Density: 105/km^{2} (273/sq mi)
- Time zone: UTC+01:00 (CET)
  - Summer (DST): UTC+02:00 (CEST)
- INSEE/Postal code: 33054 /33190
- ^{1} French Land Register data, which excludes lakes, ponds, glaciers > 1 km^{2} (0.386 sq mi or 247 acres) and river estuaries.

Blaignac (French pronunciation: [blɛɲak]; Occitan: Blanhac, [ˈblaɲak]) is a commune in the department of Gironde, and the region of New Aquitaine, southwestern France.

== Population ==
Historical population
Year	Pop.	±% p.a.
1968	210	—
1975	180	−2.18%
1982	186	+0.47%
1990	203	+1.10%
1999	221	+0.95%
2007	257	+1.90%
2012	278	+1.58%
2017	287	+0.64%
2023	335	+2.61%
Source: INSEE

== See also ==
- Communes of the Gironde department
